= List of 2020–21 Super Rugby Aotearoa transfers =

This is a list of player movements for Super Rugby teams prior to the end of the 2021 Super Rugby Aotearoa season. Departure and arrivals of all players that were included in a Super Rugby squad for 2020 or 2021 are listed here, regardless of when it occurred. Future-dated transfers are only included if confirmed by the player or his agent, his former team or his new team.

Notes

- 2020 players listed are all players that were named in the initial senior squad, or subsequently included in a 23-man match day squad at any game during the season.
- (did not play) denotes that a player did not play at all during one of the two seasons due to injury or non-selection. These players are included to indicate they were contracted to the team. For the 2020 season, Super Rugby was suspended after 7 rounds of matches due to the COVID-19 pandemic, with regional tournaments taking place there after. Players listed as 'did not play' did not feature in any of the 7 rounds of matches played that season. For the 2021 season, players listed as 'did not play' did not feature in any of the Super Rugby Aotearoa or Super Rugby Trans-Tasman fixtures that season.
- (short-term) denotes that a player wasn't initially contracted, but came in during the season. This could either be a club rugby player coming in as injury cover, or a player whose contract had expired at another team (typically in the northern hemisphere).
- Flags are only shown for players moving to or from another country.
- Players may play in several positions, but are listed in only one.

== Blues ==
Blues transfers 2020–2021
Pos	2020 squad	Out	In	2021 players
PR	Alex Hodgman; Ezekiel Lindenmuth; Sione Mafileo; Marcel Renata; Karl Tu'inukuafe; Ofa Tu'ungafasi; Joe Walsh (short-term)	(substituted off) Ezekiel Lindenmuth (to Chiefs); (substituted off) Sione Mafileo (to Chiefs); (substituted off) Joe Walsh (returned to Southland)	(substituted on) Nepo Laulala (from Chiefs); (substituted on) James Lay (from Auckland)	Alex Hodgman; Nepo Laulala; James Lay; Marcel Renata; Karl Tu'inukuafe; Ofa Tu'ungafasi
HK	Kurt Eklund; Ray Niuia; James Parsons; Luteru Tolai (short-term)	(substituted off) James Parsons (retired)	(substituted on) Leni Apisai (from (Japan) Sunwolves); (substituted on) Soane Vikena (from Auckland)	Leni Apisai (short-term); Kurt Eklund; Ray Niuia; Luteru Tolai (short-term); Soane Vikena
LK	Sam Caird (short-term, did not play); Aaron Carroll; Gerard Cowley-Tuioti; Josh Goodhue; Jacob Pierce; Patrick Tuipulotu	(substituted off) Sam Caird (to (Australia) Waratahs); (substituted off) Aaron Carroll (to Bay of Plenty)	(substituted on) Sam Darry (from Canterbury)	Gerard Cowley-Tuioti; Sam Darry; Josh Goodhue; Jacob Pierce; Patrick Tuipulotu
FL	Blake Gibson; Tony Lamborn; Dalton Papalii; Waimana Riedlinger-Kapa (did not play); Tom Robinson; Hoskins Sotutu; James Tucker (did not play)	(substituted off) Tony Lamborn (to Southland); (substituted off) Waimana Riedlinger-Kapa (to Auckland); (substituted off) James Tucker (to (Australia) Brumbies)	(substituted on) Adrian Choat (from Auckland); (substituted on) Dillon Hunt (from Highlanders); (substituted on) Taine Plumtree (from Wellington)	Adrian Choat (short-term); Blake Gibson; Dillon Hunt (did not play); Dalton Papalii; Taine Plumtree; Tom Robinson; Hoskins Sotutu
N8	Akira Ioane			Akira Ioane
SH	Finlay Christie (did not play); Sam Nock; Jonathan Ruru			Finlay Christie; Sam Nock; Jonathan Ruru
FH	Beauden Barrett (did not play); Otere Black; Jack Heighton (did not play); Stephen Perofeta; Harry Plummer	(substituted off) Beauden Barrett (to (Japan) Suntory Sungoliath); (substituted off) Jack Heighton (to North Harbour)		Otere Black; Stephen Perofeta; Harry Plummer
CE	TJ Faiane; Rieko Ioane; Joe Marchant; Tanielu Teleʻa (did not play)	(substituted off) Joe Marchant (returned to (England) Harlequins)	(substituted on) Bryce Heem (from (France) Toulon)	TJ Faiane; Bryce Heem; Rieko Ioane; Tanielu Teleʻa
WG	Caleb Clarke (did not play); Matt Duffie; Jordan Hyland; Emoni Narawa; Mark Tele'a	(substituted off) Matt Duffie (to (Japan) Honda Heat); (substituted off) Jordan Hyland (to Northland)	(substituted on) AJ Lam (from Auckland); (substituted on) Jone Macilai-Tori (from Northland); (substituted on) Jacob Ratumaitavuki-Kneepkens (from Taranaki)	Caleb Clarke; AJ Lam; Jone Macilai-Tori (did not play); Emoni Narawa; Jacob Ratumaitavuki-Kneepkens; Mark Tele'a
FB	Jared Page (did not play)	(substituted off) Jared Page (to North Harbour)	(substituted on) Zarn Sullivan (from Auckland)	Zarn Sullivan
Coach	Leon MacDonald			Leon MacDonald

== Chiefs ==
Chiefs transfers 2020–2021
Pos	2020 squad	Out	In	2021 players
PR	Rob Cobb (wider training squad, did not play); Ryan Coxon; Ross Geldenhuys (wider training squad); Nepo Laulala; Atu Moli; Ollie Norris (wider training squad); Reuben O'Neill; Aidan Ross; Angus Ta'avao	(substituted off) Rob Cobb (to Waikato); (substituted off) Ryan Coxon (to Tasman); (substituted off) Ross Geldenhuys (to Bay of Plenty); (substituted off) Nepo Laulala (to Blues)	(substituted on) Joe Apikotoa (from Hawke's Bay); (substituted on) Ezekiel Lindenmuth (from Blues); (substituted on) Sione Mafileo (from Blues)	Joe Apikotoa (short-term); Ezekiel Lindenmuth (short-term); Sione Mafileo; Atu Moli; Ollie Norris; Reuben O'Neill; Aidan Ross; Angus Ta'avao
HK	Donald Maka; Bradley Slater; Samisoni Taukei'aho	(substituted off) Donald Maka (to Counties Manukau)	(substituted on) Nathan Harris (returned from injury)	Nathan Harris; Bradley Slater; Samisoni Taukei'aho
LK	Naitoa Ah Kuoi; Michael Allardice; Tyler Ardron; Laghlan McWhannell (did not play); Tupou Vaa'i (wider training squad, did not play)	(substituted off) Michael Allardice (to (Japan) Toyota Verblitz); (substituted off) Tyler Ardron (to (France) Castres)	(substituted on) Josh Lord (from Taranaki)	Naitoa Ah Kuoi; Josh Lord; Laghlan McWhannell (did not play); Tupou Vaa'i
FL	Lachlan Boshier; Sam Cane; Luke Jacobson; Mitchell Karpik; Dylan Nel; Pita Gus Sowakula; James Thompson (wider training squad, did not play)	(substituted off) Dylan Nel (to Otago); (substituted off) James Thompson (to Waikato)	(substituted on) Kaylum Boshier (from Taranaki); (substituted on) Samipeni Finau (from Waikato); (substituted on) Tom Florence (from Taranaki); (substituted on) Zane Kapeli (from Highlanders); (substituted on) Liam Messam (from Waikato); (substituted on) Simon Parker (from Waikato); (substituted on) Viliami Taulani (from Counties Manukau)	Kaylum Boshier; Lachlan Boshier; Sam Cane; Samipeni Finau (short-term); Tom Florence (short-term); Luke Jacobson; Zane Kapeli (short-term); Mitchell Karpik; Liam Messam (short-term); Simon Parker; Pita Gus Sowakula; Viliami Taulani (short-term)
N8	Mitchell Brown; Adam Thomson (wider training squad)	(substituted off) Adam Thomson (to Waikato)		Mitchell Brown
SH	Leroy Carter (wider training squad, did not play); Lisati Milo-Harris; Te Toiroa Tahuriorangi; Brad Weber	(substituted off) Leroy Carter (to Bay of Plenty); (substituted off) Lisati Milo-Harris (to Taranaki)	(substituted on) Xavier Roe (from Waikato)	Xavier Roe; Te Toiroa Tahuriorangi; Brad Weber
FH	Aaron Cruden; Tiaan Falcon; Kaleb Trask	(substituted off) Aaron Cruden (to (Japan) Kobelco Steelers); (substituted off) Tiaan Falcon (to (Japan) Toyota Verblitz)	(substituted on) Bryn Gatland (from Highlanders); (substituted on) Rivez Reihana (from Waikato)	Bryn Gatland; Rivez Reihana; Kaleb Trask
CE	Orbyn Leger; Anton Lienert-Brown; Tumua Manu; Alex Nankivell; Bailyn Sullivan (did not play); Quinn Tupaea	(substituted off) Orbyn Leger (to Hurricanes); (substituted off) Tumua Manu (to (France) Pau)	(substituted on) Rameka Poihipi (from Canterbury)	Anton Lienert-Brown; Alex Nankivell; Rameka Poihipi; Bailyn Sullivan; Quinn Tupaea
WG	Solomon Alaimalo; Kini Naholo (did not play); Etene Nanai-Seturo (did not play); Shaun Stevenson; Sean Wainui	(substituted off) Solomon Alaimalo (to Highlanders); (substituted off) Kini Naholo (injured)	(substituted on) Jonah Lowe (from Hurricanes); (substituted on) Gideon Wrampling (from Waikato)	Jonah Lowe; Etene Nanai-Seturo; Shaun Stevenson; Sean Wainui; Gideon Wrampling (short-term)
FB	Damian McKenzie; Sam McNicol	(substituted off) Sam McNicol (to Hawke's Bay)	(substituted on) Chase Tiatia (from Hurricanes)	Damian McKenzie; Chase Tiatia
Coach	Warren Gatland	(substituted off) Warren Gatland (to British and Irish Lions)	(substituted on) Clayton McMillan (from Bay of Plenty)	Clayton McMillan

== Crusaders ==
Crusaders transfers 2020–2021
Pos	2020 squad	Out	In	2021 players
PR	Michael Alaalatoa; Harry Allan (did not play); George Bower; Oliver Jager; Joe Moody; Isi Tu'ungafasi	(substituted off) Harry Allan (to Canterbury)	(substituted on) Fletcher Newell (from Canterbury); (substituted on) Tamaiti Williams (from Canterbury)	Michael Alaalatoa; George Bower; Oliver Jager; Joe Moody; Fletcher Newell; Isi Tu'ungafasi; Tamaiti Williams
HK	Andrew Makalio; Brodie McAlister; Hugh Roach (short-term); Codie Taylor	(substituted off) Hugh Roach (to (United States) Austin Gilgronis)	(substituted on) Quentin MacDonald (from Tasman); (substituted on) Nathan Vella (from Highlanders)	Quentin MacDonald (short-term, did not play); Andrew Makalio (did not play); Brodie McAlister; Codie Taylor; Nathan Vella
LK	Scott Barrett; Mitchell Dunshea; Luke Romano; Quinten Strange (did not play)		(substituted on) Sam Whitelock (returned from (Japan) Panasonic Wild Knights)	Scott Barrett; Mitchell Dunshea; Luke Romano; Quinten Strange; Sam Whitelock
FL	Ethan Blackadder (did not play); Tom Christie; Cullen Grace; Billy Harmon (did not play); Sione Havili; Ethan Roots; Tom Sanders	(substituted off) Billy Harmon (to Highlanders); (substituted off) Ethan Roots (to North Harbour)	(substituted on) Liam Allen (from Canterbury); (substituted on) Brendon O'Connor (from (Japan) Sunwolves)	Liam Allen (short-term); Ethan Blackadder; Tom Christie; Cullen Grace; Sione Havili; Brendon O'Connor (short-term); Tom Sanders
N8	Whetu Douglas			Whetu Douglas
SH	Mitchell Drummond; Ere Enari; Bryn Hall			Mitchell Drummond; Ere Enari; Bryn Hall
FH	Fergus Burke; Brett Cameron; Richie Mo'unga			Fergus Burke; Brett Cameron (did not play); Richie Mo'unga
CE	Braydon Ennor; Inga Finau (did not play); Jack Goodhue; Dallas McLeod	(substituted off) Inga Finau (to Auckland)	(substituted on) Isaiah Punivai (from Canterbury); (substituted on) Rene Ranger (from Northland)	Braydon Ennor; Jack Goodhue; Dallas McLeod; Isaiah Punivai (did not play); Rene Ranger (did not play)
WG	George Bridge; Leicester Fainga'anuku; Will Jordan; Manasa Mataele; Fetuli Paea (did not play); Sevu Reece	(substituted off) Fetuli Paea (to Highlanders)	(substituted on) Chay Fihaki (from Canterbury); (substituted on) Josh McKay (from Highlanders)	George Bridge; Leicester Fainga'anuku; Chay Fihaki; Will Jordan; Manasa Mataele; Josh McKay; Sevu Reece
FB	David Havili			David Havili
Coach	Scott Robertson			Scott Robertson

== Highlanders ==
Highlanders transfers 2020–2021
Pos	2020 squad	Out	In	2021 players
PR	Ethan de Groot (did not play); Josh Iosefa-Scott; Ayden Johnstone; Daniel Lienert-Brown; Conán O'Donnell (short-term); Jeff Thwaites; Siate Tokolahi	(substituted off) Josh Iosefa-Scott (to Waikato); (substituted off) Conán O'Donnell (to Counties Manukau)	(substituted on) Jermaine Ainsley (from (Australia) Rebels); (substituted on) Josh Hohneck (from Otago)	Jermaine Ainsley (did not play); Ethan de Groot; Josh Hohneck; Ayden Johnstone; Daniel Lienert-Brown; Jeff Thwaites; Siate Tokolahi
HK	Liam Coltman; Ash Dixon; Nathan Vella (did not play)	(substituted off) Nathan Vella (to Crusaders)	(substituted on) Ricky Jackson (returned from injury)	Liam Coltman; Ash Dixon; Ricky Jackson (did not play)
LK	Josh Dickson; Pari Pari Parkinson; Manaaki Selby-Rickit; Will Tucker (short-term, did not play); Jack Whetton	(substituted off) Will Tucker (returned to Otago); (substituted off) Jack Whetton (to (Australia) Waratahs)	(substituted on) Bryn Evans (from Hawke's Bay); (substituted on) Jack Regan (from Otago)	Josh Dickson; Bryn Evans; Pari Pari Parkinson; Jack Regan (short-term); Manaaki Selby-Rickit
FL	Teariki Ben-Nicholas; Shannon Frizell; Dillon Hunt; Zane Kapeli (did not play); James Lentjes; Slade McDowall (short-term, did not play); Sione Misiloi (did not play); Jesse Parete	(substituted off) Dillon Hunt (to Blues); (substituted off) Zane Kapeli (to Chiefs); (substituted off) Slade McDowall (returned to Otago); (substituted off) Jesse Parete (to (Japan) Canon Eagles)	(substituted on) Billy Harmon (from Crusaders); (substituted on) Hugh Renton (from Tasman); (substituted on) Liam Squire (from (Japan) NTT Red Hurricanes)	Teariki Ben-Nicholas; Shannon Frizell; Billy Harmon; James Lentjes; Sione Misiloi (did not play); Hugh Renton (short-term); Liam Squire (did not play)
N8	Marino Mikaele-Tu’u		(substituted on) Kazuki Himeno (from (Japan) Toyota Verblitz)	Kazuki Himeno; Marino Mikaele-Tu’u
SH	Folau Fakatava (did not play); Kayne Hammington; Aaron Smith		(substituted on) James Arscott (from Otago)	James Arscott (short-term); Folau Fakatava; Kayne Hammington; Aaron Smith
FH	Bryn Gatland (did not play); Mitchell Hunt; Josh Ioane	(substituted off) Bryn Gatland (to Chiefs)	(substituted on) Caleb Makene (from Hawke's Bay); (substituted on) Tim O'Malley (from Tasman)	Mitchell Hunt; Josh Ioane; Caleb Makene (short-term); Tim O'Malley (short-term)
CE	Michael Collins; Scott Gregory; Rob Thompson; Sio Tomkinson; Thomas Umaga-Jensen (did not play); Teihorangi Walden	(substituted off) Rob Thompson (to (Japan) Toyota Verblitz); (substituted off) Teihorangi Walden (to Taranaki)	(substituted on) Fetuli Paea (from Crusaders); (substituted on) Josh Timu (from Otago)	Michael Collins; Scott Gregory; Fetuli Paea (did not play); Josh Timu (short-term, did not play); Sio Tomkinson; Thomas Umaga-Jensen
WG	Tima Fainga'anuku; Josh McKay; Tevita Nabura (did not play); Jona Nareki; Ngane Punivai	(substituted off) Tima Fainga'anuku (to Tasman); (substituted off) Josh McKay (to Crusaders); (substituted off) Tevita Nabura (to Counties Manukau)	(substituted on) Solomon Alaimalo (from Chiefs); (substituted on) Connor Garden-Bachop (returned from injury); (substituted on) Sam Gilbert (from Otago); (substituted on) Josh Moorby (from Southland); (substituted on) Freedom Vahaakolo (from Otago)	Solomon Alaimalo; Connor Garden-Bachop; Sam Gilbert; Josh Moorby (short-term, did not play); Jona Nareki; Ngane Punivai; Freedom Vahaakolo (short-term)
FB	Kirisi Kuridrani	(substituted off) Kirisi Kuridrani (to Counties Manukau)	(substituted on) Vilimoni Koroi (from Otago); (substituted on) Nehe Milner-Skudder (from (France) Toulon)	Vilimoni Koroi (did not play); Nehe Milner-Skudder
Coach	Aaron Mauger	(substituted off) Aaron Mauger (released)	(substituted on) Tony Brown (from assistant coach); (substituted on) Clarke Dermody (from assistant coach)	Tony Brown; Clarke Dermody (short-term)

== Hurricanes ==
Hurricanes transfers 2020–2021
Pos	2020 squad	Out	In	2021 players
PR	Fraser Armstrong; Alex Fidow; Tyrel Lomax; Tevita Mafileo (short-term); Ben May; Xavier Numia; Pouri Rakete-Stones	(substituted off) Ben May (to Taranaki)		Fraser Armstrong; Alex Fidow; Tyrel Lomax; Tevita Mafileo; Xavier Numia; Pouri Rakete-Stones
HK	Asafo Aumua; Dane Coles; Ricky Riccitelli		(substituted on) James O'Reilly (from Wellington)	Asafo Aumua; Dane Coles; James O'Reilly (short-term); Ricky Riccitelli
LK	James Blackwell; Kane Le'aupepe (did not play); Liam Mitchell; Scott Scrafton; Isaia Walker-Leawere			James Blackwell; Kane Le'aupepe (did not play); Liam Mitchell; Scott Scrafton; Isaia Walker-Leawere
FL	Vaea Fifita; Devan Flanders; Du'Plessis Kirifi; Reed Prinsep; Ardie Savea (did not play); Murphy Taramai (did not play)	(substituted off) Murphy Taramai (to North Harbour)		Vaea Fifita; Devan Flanders; Du'Plessis Kirifi; Reed Prinsep; Ardie Savea
N8	Gareth Evans		(substituted on) Brayden Iose (from Manawatu)	Gareth Evans; Brayden Iose
SH	Jamie Booth; TJ Perenara; Jonathan Taumateine	(substituted off) TJ Perenara (to (Japan) NTT Red Hurricanes)	(substituted on) Luke Campbell (from Bay of Plenty); (substituted on) Cameron Roigard (from Counties Manukau)	Jamie Booth (did not play); Luke Campbell; Cameron Roigard (short-term); Jonathan Taumateine
FH	Jackson Garden-Bachop; James Marshall; Fletcher Smith	(substituted off) James Marshall (retired); (substituted off) Fletcher Smith (to NTT Shining Arcs)	(substituted on) Simon Hickey (from (Scotland) Edinburgh); (substituted on) Orbyn Leger (from Chiefs)	Jackson Garden-Bachop; Simon Hickey (did not play); Orbyn Leger (short-term)
CE	Vince Aso; Ngani Laumape; Billy Proctor; Danny Toala (did not play); Peter Umaga-Jensen			Vince Aso; Ngani Laumape; Billy Proctor; Danny Toala; Peter Umaga-Jensen
WG	Wes Goosen; Ben Lam; Jonah Lowe (did not play); Kobus van Wyk	(substituted off) Ben Lam (to (France) Bordeaux); (substituted off) Jonah Lowe (to Chiefs); (substituted off) Kobus van Wyk (to (England) Leicester Tigers)	(substituted on) Pepesana Patafilo (from Wellington); (substituted on) Salesi Rayasi (returned from New Zealand Sevens); (substituted on) Julian Savea (from (France) Toulon); (substituted on) Lolagi Visinia (from Hawke's Bay)	Wes Goosen; Pepesana Patafilo; Salesi Rayasi; Julian Savea; Lolagi Visinia
FB	Jordie Barrett; Chase Tiatia	(substituted off) Chase Tiatia (to Chiefs)	(substituted on) Ruben Love (from Wellington)	Jordie Barrett; Ruben Love
Coach	Jason Holland			Jason Holland

== See also ==
- List of 2020–21 Premiership Rugby transfers
- List of 2020–21 Pro14 transfers
- List of 2020–21 Top 14 transfers
- List of 2020–21 RFU Championship transfers
- List of 2020–21 Major League Rugby transfers
- SANZAAR
- Super Rugby franchise areas
