= 2020 Mitre 10 Cup =

2020 rugby union competition in New Zealand

2020 Mitre 10 Cup season
- Countries: New Zealand
- Date: 11 September – 28 November
- Champions: Tasman
- Runners-up: Auckland
- Promoted: Hawke's Bay
- Relegated: North Harbour
- Matches played: 76
- Tries scored: 496 (average 6.5 per match)
- Top point scorer: Bryn Gatland (North Harbour); 119 points
- Top try scorer: Salesi Rayasi (Auckland); 14 tries

Official website
- www.provincial.rugby

The 2020 Mitre 10 Cup season was the 15th season of New Zealand's provincial rugby union competition since it turned professional in 2006. The regular season began on September 11, when North Harbour hosted Canterbury. It involved the top fourteen rugby unions of New Zealand. For sponsorship reasons, the competition was known as the Mitre 10 Cup and it was the fifth season under the lead sponsor. The winner of the Championship, Hawke's Bay was promoted to the Premiership, the seventh placed Premiership team, North Harbour was relegated to the Championship.

== Format ==
The Mitre 10 Cup standings were sorted by a competition points system. Four points were awarded to the winning team, a draw equaled two points, whilst a loss amounted to zero points. Unions could also win their side a respectable bonus point. To receive a bonus point, they must have scored four tries or more or lose by seven or fewer points or less. Each team was placed on their total points received. If necessary of a tiebreaker, when two or more teams finish on equal points, the union who defeated the other in a head-to-head got placed higher. In case of a draw between them, the side with the biggest points differential margin got rights to be ranked above. If they were tied on points difference, it was then decided by a highest scored try count or a coin toss. This seeding format was implemented since the beginning of the 2006 competition.

The competition included a promotion-relegation process with the winner of the Championship receiving automatic promotion to the Premiership, replacing the seventh-placed team in the Premiership which was relegated to the Championship for the following year. The regular season consisted of two types of matches. The internal division matches were when each team played the other six unions in their division once, home or away. The cross-division matches were when each team played four teams from the other division, thus missing out on three teams, each from the opposite division. Each union played home or away games against teams from the other division, making a total of ten competition games for each union. The finals format allowed the top four teams from each division move on to the semi-finals. The top two division winners, based on table points, received a home semi-final. In the first round of the finals, the semi-finals, the second division winner hosted the third division winner, and the first division winner hosted the fourth division winner. The final was hosted by the top remaining seed.

== Standings ==
Source: Mitre 10 Cup standings 2020

Premiership Division
Pos	Team	GP	W	D	L	PF	PA	PD	TB	LB	PTS
1	Auckland	10	7	0	3	299	198	+101	6	2	36
2	Tasman	10	7	0	3	288	202	+86	5	0	33
3	Bay of Plenty	10	6	0	4	268	258	+10	5	2	31
4	Waikato	10	6	0	4	257	230	+27	4	1	29
5	Canterbury	10	5	0	5	251	224	+27	5	4	29
6	Wellington	10	5	0	5	289	248	+41	7	2	29
7	North Harbour	10	5	0	5	276	226	+50	4	3	27

Championship Division
Pos	Team	GP	W	D	L	PF	PA	PD	TB	LB	PTS
1	RS – Hawke's Bay	10	7	0	3	264	209	+55	6	2	36
2	Otago	10	6	0	4	244	247	–3	5	1	30
3	Northland	10	5	0	5	221	262	–41	3	1	24
4	Taranaki	10	4	0	6	263	265	–2	4	4	24
5	Southland	10	3	0	7	144	193	–49	1	3	16
6	Counties Manukau	10	3	0	7	208	331	–123	2	0	14
7	Manawatu	10	1	0	9	198	377	–179	4	1	9

=== Standings progression ===
Premiership
Team	W1	W2	W3	W4	W5	W6	W7	W8	W9	W10
Auckland	5 (1st)	5 (6th)	10 (3rd)	14 (2nd)	19 (2nd)	24 (1st)	25 (3rd)	30 (1st)	34 (1st)	36 (1st)
Bay of Plenty	2 (5th)	6 (4th)	6 (6th)	7 (6th)	7 (7th)	12 (7th)	17 (6th)	21 (5th)	26 (4th)	31 (3rd)
Canterbury	5 (4th)	6 (3rd)	7 (5th)	12 (5th)	17 (4th)	18 (5th)	18 (5th)	19 (7th)	24 (6th)	29 (5th)
North Harbour	0 (7th)	0 (7th)	1 (7th)	6 (7th)	11 (6th)	12 (6th)	16 (7th)	20 (6th)	25 (5th)	27 (7th)
Tasman	5 (3rd)	10 (1st)	15 (1st)	15 (1st)	20 (1st)	20 (3rd)	25 (2nd)	29 (2nd)	29 (2nd)	33 (2nd)
Waikato	5 (2nd)	10 (2nd)	10 (4th)	14 (3rd)	19 (3rd)	23 (2nd)	27 (1st)	27 (3rd)	29 (3rd)	29 (4th)
Wellington	1 (6th)	6 (5th)	11 (2nd)	13 (4th)	15 (5th)	19 (4th)	24 (4th)	24 (4th)	24 (7th)	29 (6th)
Championship
Team	W1	W2	W3	W4	W5	W6	W7	W8	W9	W10
Counties Manukau	0 (5th)	0 (7th)	0 (7th)	5 (6th)	5 (6th)	5 (6th)	5 (6th)	10 (6th)	10 (6th)	14 (6th)
Hawke's Bay	1 (4th)	6 (2nd)	10 (1st)	15 (1st)	15 (2nd)	20 (1st)	25 (1st)	26 (2nd)	31 (1st)	36 (1st)
Manawatu	0 (6th)	1 (6th)	1 (6th)	3 (7th)	3 (7th)	4 (7th)	4 (7th)	9 (7th)	9 (7th)	9 (7th)
Northland	5 (1st)	5 (4th)	9 (5th)	14 (2nd)	18 (1st)	18 (3rd)	18 (3rd)	18 (3rd)	19 (4th)	24 (3rd)
Otago	0 (7th)	5 (5th)	10 (2nd)	10 (4th)	15 (3rd)	20 (2nd)	25 (2nd)	29 (1st)	29 (2nd)	30 (2nd)
Southland	4 (3rd)	5 (3rd)	9 (3rd)	10 (3rd)	11 (4th)	11 (5th)	11 (5th)	11 (5th)	16 (5th)	16 (5th)
Taranaki	5 (2nd)	9 (1st)	9 (4th)	9 (5th)	10 (5th)	14 (4th)	15 (4th)	17 (4th)	22 (3rd)	24 (4th)
The table above shows a team's progression throughout the season. For each week, their cumulative points total is shown with the overall division log position in brackets.
Key:	Win	Draw	Loss	Bye						

== Regular season ==
The 2020 Mitre 10 Cup played across ten weeks. The competition started on September 11, with North Harbour taking on Canterbury at North Harbour Stadium in Auckland.

=== Week 1 ===
11 September 2020
19:05 NZST

North Harbour	29–43	Canterbury
Try: Ngarohi McGarvey-Black 29'; Walter Fifita 75'; Con: Bryn Gatland (2/2) 30', 76'; Pen: Bryn Gatland (5/5) 4', 12', 15', 36', 40'	Report	Try: Codie Taylor (2) 9', 63'; Rameka Poihipi 27'; Cullen Grace 37'; Isaiah Punivai 59'; George Bridge 79'; Con: Brett Cameron (3/3) 10', 28', 38'; Richie Mo'unga (2/3) 60', 80'; Pen: Brett Cameron (1/2) 44'

North Harbour Stadium, Albany
Referee: Paul Williams

12 September 2020
14:05 NZST

Waikato	53–28	Wellington
Try: Xavier Roe 16'; Fletcher Smith 18'; Adam Thomson 50'; Damian McKenzie 67'; Luke Jacobson 74'; Con: Damian McKenzie (5/5) 17', 19', 51', 68', 75'; Pen: Damian McKenzie (6/7) 11', 14', 24', 46', 62', 80'	Report	Try: Julian Savea 6'; Vaea Fifita 29'; Connor Garden-Bachop 40'; Ardie Savea 53'; Con: Jackson Garden-Bachop (4/4) 7', 30', 41', 54'

Waikato Stadium, Hamilton
Referee: Daniel Waenga

12 September 2020
16:35 NZST

Otago	6–38	Auckland
Pen: Josh Ioane (2/3) 4', 20'; Cards: Liam Coltman (yellow card) 61'; Jack Regan (yellow card) 70'; Sio Tomkinson (red card) 80'	Report	Try: Leni Apisai (2) 8', 35'; AJ Lam 33'; Rieko Ioane 41'; Penalty try 48'; Con: Harry Plummer (4/4) 9', 34', 36', 42'; Pen: Harry Plummer (1/1) 17'

Forsyth Barr Stadium, Dunedin
Referee: Nick Briant

12 September 2020
19:05 NZST

Counties Manukau	24–41	Tasman
Try: Potu Leavasa Jr. 30'; Dalton Papalii 36'; Viliami Taulani 79'; Con: Baden Kerr (3/3) 31', 37', 80'; Pen: Baden Kerr (1/1) 9'	Report	Try: Andrew Makalio (2) 5', 17'; Te Ahiwaru Cirikidaveta 20'; Leicester Fainga'anuku 52'; Shannon Frizell 73'; Con: Mitchell Hunt (4/4) 6', 18', 21', 53'; Tim O'Malley (1/1) 74'; Pen: Mitchell Hunt (2/3) 58', 68'

Navigation Homes Stadium, Pukekohe
Referee: Richard Kelly

13 September 2020
14:05 NZST

Northland	43–26	Manawatu
Try: Sam Caird 28'; Sam Nock 32'; Kara Pryor 40'; Sam McNamara 41'; Jordan Olsen 70'; Rene Ranger 79'; Con: Wiseguy Faiane (5/6) 29', 33', 42', 71', 80'; Pen: Dan Hawkins (1/1) 7'	Report	Try: Sam Stewart 9'; James Tofa 19'; Con: Ben Wyness (2/2) 10', 20'; Pen: Ben Wyness (4/5) 4', 13', 54', 65'; Cards: Nehe Milner-Skudder (yellow card) 68'

Okara Park, Whangārei
Referee: Brendon Pickerill

13 September 2020
14:05 NZST

Taranaki	36–29	Bay of Plenty
Try: Tupou Vaa'i (2) 3', 52'; Ricky Riccitelli 25'; Penalty try 38'; Jordie Barrett 70'; Con: Jordie Barrett (3/4) 4', 26', 53'; Pen: Jordie Barrett (1/2) 29'	Report	Try: Te Toiroa Tahuriorangi 11'; Keepa Mewett 21'; Emoni Narawa 33'; Fa'asiu Fuatai 76'; Con: Dan Hollinshead (2/3) 12', 22'; Otere Black (1/1) 77'; Pen: Otere Black (1/1) 47'; Cards: Aaron Carroll (yellow card) 38'

TET Stadium & Events Centre, Inglewood
Referee: Ben O'Keeffe

13 September 2020
16:35 NZST

Southland	16–10	Hawke's Bay
Try: Greg Pleasants-Tate (2) 45', 50'; Con: Scott Eade (0/2); Pen: Scott Eade (2/3) 7', 13'	Report	Try: Ash Dixon (2) 20', 40'; Con: Lincoln McClutchie (0/2)

Rugby Park Stadium, Invercargill
Referee: James Doleman

=== Week 2 ===
18 September 2020
19:05 NZST

Tasman	54–21	Northland
Try: Sevu Reece (3) 3', 52', 74'; Leicester Fainga'anuku 19'; Andrew Makalio 27'; Fetuli Paea 45'; Will Jordan 48'; Jacob Norris 59'; Con: Mitchell Hunt (5/6) 20', 28', 46', 49', 53'; Tim O'Malley (2/2) 60', 75'	Report	Try: Kara Pryor 40'; Harrison Levien 54'; Lua Li 67'; Con: Wiseguy Faiane (3/3) 40', 55', 68'

Lansdowne Park, Blenheim
Referee: Paul Williams

19 September 2020
14:05 NZST

Waikato	41–19	North Harbour
Try: Xavier Roe (2) 10', 21'; Quinn Tupaea 15'; Mitch Jacobson 30'; Damian McKenzie 45'; Valynce Crosby-Te Whare 80'; Con: Damian McKenzie (4/6) 11', 22', 31', 46'; Pen: Damian McKenzie (1/2) 37'	Report	Try: Luteru Tolai 34'; Jacob Pierce 40'; Lewis Gjaltema 72'; Con: Bryn Gatland (2/3) 35', 73'

Waikato Stadium, Hamilton
Referee: Mike Fraser

19 September 2020
16:35 NZST

Canterbury	22–23	Taranaki – RS
Try: Oliver Jager 42'; Richie Mo'unga 56'; Andrew Knewstubb 71'; Con: Richie Mo'unga (2/3) 57', 72'; Pen: Richie Mo'unga (1/1) 22'	Report	Try: Jacob Ratumaitavuki-Kneepkens (2) 6', 27'; Tupou Vaa'i 10'; Con: Jordie Barrett (1/3) 28'; Pen: Jordie Barrett (2/3) 3', 75'

Rugby League Park, Christchurch
Referee: Ben O'Keeffe

19 September 2020
19:05 NZST

Bay of Plenty	17–14	Southland
Try: Fa'asiu Fuatai 11'; Te Toiroa Tahuriorangi 39'; Con: Otere Black (2/2) 12', 40'; Pen: Dan Hollinshead (0/1); Otere Black (1/2) 55'	Report	Try: Amanaki Nicole 26'; Greg Pleasants-Tate 35'; Con: Scott Eade (2/2) 27', 36'; Cards: Greg Pleasants-Tate (yellow card) 60'

Rotorua International Stadium, Rotorua
Referee: Daniel Waenga

20 September 2020
14:05 NZST

Hawke's Bay	31–17	Counties Manukau
Try: Brad Weber (2) 7', 32'; Penalty try 23'; Lolagi Visinia 33'; Devan Flanders 67'; Con: Lincoln McClutchie (2/3) 8', 34'; Caleb Makene (0/1); Pen: Lincoln McClutchie (0/1); Caleb Makene (0/1)	Report	Try: Kirisi Kuridrani 40'; Samuel Slade 65'; Con: Baden Kerr (1/1) 41'; Jason Robertson (1/1) 66'; Pen: Baden Kerr (1/1) 11'; Cards: Samuel Slade (yellow card) 15'; Matiaha Martin (yellow card) 23'

McLean Park, Napier
Referee: Angus Mabey

20 September 2020
14:05 NZST

Manawatu	25–36	Otago
Try: Jamie Booth 16'; Aaron Smith (2) 67', 75'; Micaiah Torrance-Read 79'; Con: Ben Wyness (0/1); Stewart Cruden (1/3) 68'; Pen: Ben Wyness (1/2) 8'; Adam Boult (0/1)	Report	Try: Vilimoni Koroi (2) 33', 61'; Liam Coltman 37'; Freedom Vaha'akolo 43'; Michael Collins 65'; Con: Josh Ioane (4/5) 34', 38', 62', 66'; Pen: Josh Ioane (1/1) 46'

Arena Manawatu, Palmerston North
Referee: Richard Kelly

20 September 2020
16:35 NZST

Auckland	21–39	Wellington
Try: Leni Apisai 4'; Jonathan Ruru 38'; Caleb Clarke 55'; Con: Harry Plummer (3/3) 5', 39', 56'; Pen: Harry Plummer (0/1)	Report	Try: Vince Aso (2) 11', 73'; Wes Goosen 17'; Peter Umaga-Jensen 23'; Billy Proctor 30'; Pepesana Patafilo 40'; Con: Jackson Garden-Bachop (3/6) 24', 40', 74'; Pen: Jackson Garden-Bachop (1/1) 61'

Eden Park, Auckland
Referee: James Doleman

=== Week 3 ===
25 September 2020
19:05 NZST

Wellington	32–10	Bay of Plenty
Try: Teariki Ben-Nicholas (2) 28', 47'; Wes Goosen 37'; Tyrone Thompson 62'; Ruben Love 79'; Con: Jackson Garden-Bachop (2/5) 29', 63'; Pen: Jackson Garden-Bachop (1/1) 43'; Cards: Xavier Numia (yellow card) 67'	Report	Try: Nathan Vella 1'; Con: Dan Hollinshead (1/1) 2'; Pen: Dan Hollinshead (1/3) 33'; Cards: Fa'asiu Fuatai (red card) 67'

Wellington Regional Stadium, Wellington
Referee: Brendon Pickerill

26 September 2020
14:05 NZST

Tasman	34–17	Waikato
Try: David Havili (3) 8', 57', 69'; Andrew Makalio 39'; Alex Nankivell 47'; Con: Mitchell Hunt (3/5) 48', 58', 70'; Pen: Mitchell Hunt (1/1) 30'	Report	Try: Quinn Tupaea 34'; Valynce Crosby-Te Whare 63'; Fletcher Smith 67'; Con: Fletcher Smith (1/3) 68'

Trafalgar Park, Nelson
Referee: Richard Kelly

26 September 2020
16:35 NZST

Southland	11–10	North Harbour
Try: Rory van Vugt 57'; Con: Scott Eade (0/1); Pen: Scott Eade (1/2) 66'; Greg Dyer (1/1) 80'	Report	Try: Tim Sail 18'; Con: Bryn Gatland (1/1) 19'; Pen: Bryn Gatland (1/1) 76'; Cards: Nic Mayhew (yellow card) 35'; Gerard Cowley-Tuioti (yellow card) 54'

Rugby Park Stadium, Invercargill
Referee: James Munro

26 September 2020
19:05 NZST

Hawke's Bay	20–19	Canterbury
Try: Lolagi Visinia 27'; Jonah Lowe 68'; Ash Dixon 80'; Con: Lincoln McClutchie (1/3) 28'; Pen: Lincoln McClutchie (1/1) 20'	Report	Try: Shilo Klein 43'; Sam Darry 54'; Josh McKay 59'; Con: Brett Cameron (2/3) 55', 60'; Pen: Brett Cameron (0/1)

McLean Park, Napier
Referee: Cameron Stone

27 September 2020
14:05 NZST

Auckland	50–12	Manawatu
Try: AJ Lam (2) 12', 61'; Waimana Riedlinger-Kapa 23'; Simon Hickey (2) 32', 43'; Salesi Rayasi 38'; Blake Gibson 70'; Jordan Trainor 73'; Con: Simon Hickey (5/8) 24', 33', 39', 71', 74'	Report	Try: Adam Boult 20'; Sam Stewart 80'; Con: Stewart Cruden (0/1); Ben Wyness (1/1) 80'; Cards: Filo Paulo (yellow card) 9'; Tietie Tuimauga (yellow card) 17'

Eden Park, Auckland
Referee: Daniel Waenga

27 September 2020
14:05 NZST

Taranaki	19–30	Otago – RS
Try: Stephen Perofeta 13'; Kaylum Boshier 49'; Lachlan Boshier 75'; Con: Jayson Potroz (1/2) 50'; Daniel Waite (1/1) 76'	Report	Try: Dylan Nel 10'; Freedom Vaha'akolo 33'; Liam Coltman 38'; Josh Ioane 58'; Con: Josh Ioane (2/4) 34', 39'; Pen: Josh Ioane (2/2) 6', 72'

TET Stadium & Events Centre, Inglewood
Referee: Angus Mabey

27 September 2020
16:35 NZST

Counties Manukau	15–24	Northland
Try: Kieran Read 26'; Alamanda Motuga 36'; Con: Baden Kerr (1/2) 37'; Pen: Baden Kerr (1/1) 54'	Report	Try: Temo Mayanavanua 49'; Jordan Olsen 57'; Pisi Leilua 67'; Con: Dan Hawkins (3/3) 50', 58', 68'; Pen: Dan Hawkins (1/1) 7'; Cards: Lua Li (yellow card) 35'

Navigation Homes Stadium, Pukekohe
Referee: Ben O'Keeffe

=== Week 4 ===
2 October 2020
19:05 NZST

Bay of Plenty	16–20	Auckland
Try: Leroy Carter 53'; Con: Otere Black (1/1) 54'; Pen: Otere Black (3/3) 20', 32', 35'	Report	Try: Salesi Rayasi (2) 27', 38'; Con: Simon Hickey (2/2) 28', 39'; Pen: Simon Hickey (1/1) 16'; Harry Plummer (1/2) 56'

Rotorua International Stadium, Rotorua
Referee: Ben O'Keeffe

3 October 2020
14:05 NZST

Counties Manukau	36–30	Manawatu
Try: Alamanda Motuga (3) 26', 54', 59'; Orbyn Leger 36'; Kirisi Kuridrani 70'; Con: Baden Kerr (1/2) 27'; Jason Robertson (3/3) 55', 60', 71'; Pen: Baden Kerr (1/1) 48'	Report	Try: Shamus Hurley-Langton 21'; James Tofa 24'; Sam Stewart 31'; Te Rangatira Waitokia 51'; Drew Wild 73'; Con: Ben Wyness (1/4) 25'; Stewart Cruden (0/1); Pen: Ben Wyness (1/1) 40'

Navigation Homes Stadium, Pukekohe
Referee: Mike Fraser

3 October 2020
16:35 NZST

Northland	35–25	Taranaki
Try: Scott Gregory 26'; Josh Goodhue 29'; Jone Macilai-Tori 66'; Kara Pryor 72'; Con: Dan Hawkins (3/4) 27', 67', 73'; Pen: Dan Hawkins (3/3) 12', 53', 64'; Cards: Robert Rush (yellow card) 76'	Report	Try: Daniel Waite 40'; Jayson Potroz 50'; Jacob Ratumaitavuki-Kneepkens 76'; Con: Jayson Potroz (2/3) 40', 51'; Pen: Jayson Potroz (2/4) 43', 54'; Cards: Stephen Perofeta (yellow card) 71'

Okara Park, Whangārei
Referee: Angus Mabey

3 October 2020
19:05 NZST

Canterbury	31–26	Wellington
Try: Mitchell Drummond 20'; Ngane Punivai 38'; Tom Christie 77'; Isaiah Punivai 80'; Con: Fergus Burke (1/4) 39'; Pen: Fergus Burke (3/3) 3', 25', 66'; Cards: Luke Romano (yellow card) 40'	Report	Try: Vince Aso 31'; Naitoa Ah Kuoi 40'; Peter Umaga-Jensen 43'; Tyrone Thompson 62'; Con: Jackson Garden-Bachop (3/4) 32', 44', 63'; Pen: Jackson Garden-Bachop (0/1)

Rugby League Park, Christchurch
Referee: Paul Williams

4 October 2020
14:05 NZST

North Harbour	40–24	Tasman
Try: Jared Page 29'; Luteru Tolai 63'; James Little 69'; Teague McElroy 77'; Con: Bryn Gatland (4/4) 30', 64', 70', 78'; Pen: Bryn Gatland (4/4) 11', 13', 40', 49'	Report	Try: Mark Tele'a 23'; Finlay Christie 50'; David Havili 80'; Con: Mitchell Hunt (3/3) 24', 51', 80'; Pen: Mitchell Hunt (1/1) 4'; David Havili (0/1); Cards: Isaac Salmon (yellow card) 44'; Sam Matenga (yellow card) 48'

North Harbour Stadium, Albany
Referee: Nick Briant

4 October 2020
14:05 NZST

Southland	9–10	Waikato
Pen: Greg Dyer (2/3) 23', 50'; Scott Eade (1/1) 72'	Report	Try: Liam Coombes-Fabling 62'; Con: Fletcher Smith (1/1) 63'; Drop: Fletcher Smith (1/1) 75'

Rugby Park Stadium, Invercargill
Referee: Jonathan Bredin

4 October 2020
16:35 NZST

Otago	9–28	Hawke's Bay – RS
Pen: Josh Ioane (3/3) 11', 21', 56'; Cards: Vilimoni Koroi (yellow card) 63'; Slade McDowall (red card) 72'	Report	Try: Lolagi Visinia 36'; Folau Fakatava 51'; Isaia Walker-Leawere 65'; Kurt Baker 77'; Con: Lincoln McClutchie (2/2) 37', 52'; Caleb Makene (2/2) 66', 78'

Forsyth Barr Stadium, Dunedin
Referee: Cameron Stone

=== Week 5 ===
9 October 2020
19:05 NZST

Manawatu	10–34	Canterbury
Try: Josiah Maraku 70'; Drew Wild 77'; Con: Stewart Cruden (0/2)	Report	Try: Rameka Poihipi 37'; Fergus Burke 46'; Mitchell Drummond 55'; Chay Fihaki (2) 58', 60'; Con: Fergus Burke (3/5) 38', 47', 56'; Pen: Fergus Burke (1/2) 32'

Arena Manawatu, Palmerston North
Referee: Nick Briant

10 October 2020
14:05 NZST

Taranaki	28–29	Auckland
Try: Jayson Potroz (2) 10', 23'; Jacob Ratumaitavuki-Kneepkens 68'; Con: Jayson Potroz (2/3) 11', 24'; Pen: Jayson Potroz (3/3) 4', 16', 19'	Report	Try: Salesi Rayasi (2) 1', 75'; Jack Whetton 36'; AJ Lam (2) 44', 52'; Con: Harry Plummer (1/4) 37'; Simon Hickey (1/1) 76'

TET Stadium & Events Centre, Inglewood
Referee: James Doleman

10 October 2020
14:05 NZST

North Harbour	46–10	Hawke's Bay
Try: Jared Page (3) 12', 33', 39'; Dillon Hunt 25'; Murphy Taramai 61'; Bryn Gatland 65'; Tomas Aoake 76'; Con: Bryn Gatland (4/7) 40', 62', 66', 78'; Pen: Bryn Gatland (1/1) 56'	Report	Try: Marino Mikaele-Tu'u 18'; Con: Connor McLeod (1/1) 19'; Pen: Connor McLeod (1/2) 30'; Cards: Jason Long (yellow card) 48'

North Harbour Stadium, Albany
Referee: Angus Mabey

10 October 2020
16:35 NZST

Wellington	34–35	Otago
Try: Trent Renata 5'; James O'Reilly 19'; Alex Fidow 52'; Kemara Hauiti-Parapara 61'; Con: Jackson Garden-Bachop (4/4) 6', 20', 53', 62'; Pen: Jackson Garden-Bachop (2/3) 33', 40'	Report	Try: Liam Coltman 12'; Vilimoni Koroi (2) 48', 67'; Sean Withy 56'; Jack Regan 78'; Con: Josh Ioane (2/5) 13', 79'; Pen: Josh Ioane (2/2) 8', 40'

Wellington Regional Stadium, Wellington
Referee: Angus Gardner (Australia)

10 October 2020
19:05 NZST

Waikato	36–13	Counties Manukau
Try: Liam Coombes-Fabling 10'; Penalty try 40'; Adam Thomson 47'; Steven Misa 68'; Quinn Tupaea 76'; Con: Fletcher Smith (1/2) 48'; Rivez Reihana (2/2) 69', 77'; Pen: Fletcher Smith (1/1) 43'	Report	Try: Etene Nanai-Seturo 18'; Con: Jason Robertson (1/1) 19'; Pen: Jason Robertson (2/2) 14', 52'; Cards: Conán O'Donnell (yellow card) 40'

Waikato Stadium, Hamilton
Referee: Brendon Pickerill

11 October 2020
13:15 NZST

Tasman	33–7	Bay of Plenty
Try: Leicester Fainga'anuku (2) 6', 47'; Mark Tele'a 38'; Sione Havili 54'; Blair Prinsep 74'; Con: Mitchell Hunt (4/5) 39', 48', 55', 75'	Report	Try: Regan Ware 40'; Con: Otere Black (1/1) 40'; Pen: Otere Black (0/1); Cards: Chase Tiatia (yellow card) 49'

Trafalgar Park, Nelson
Referee: Cameron Stone

11 October 2020
13:15 NZST

Northland	18–14	Southland
Try: Temo Mayanavanua 13'; Sam Nock 49'; Con: Dan Hawkins (1/2) 50'; Pen: Dan Hawkins (2/2) 9', 21'; Cards: Kara Pryor (yellow card) 66'	Report	Try: Tony Lamborn 35'; Isaac Te Tamaki 47'; Con: Scott Eade (2/2) 36', 48'; Pen: Scott Eade (0/1)

Okara Park, Whangārei
Referee: Richard Kelly

=== Week 6 ===
16 October 2020
19:05 NZST

RS – Hawke's Bay	33–17	Northland
Try: Neria Fomai 45'; Ash Dixon 55'; Danny Toala 66'; Devan Flanders 75'; Con: Lincoln McClutchie (2/4) 46', 66'; Pen: Lincoln McClutchie (3/3) 18', 30', 40'	Report	Try: Lua Li (2) 60', 80'; Con: Dan Hawkins (1/1) 61'; Johnny Cooper (1/1) 80'; Pen: Dan Hawkins (1/1) 23'

McLean Park, Napier
Referee: Brendon Pickerill

17 October 2020
14:05 NZST

Manawatu	35–53	Bay of Plenty
Try: Stewart Cruden 16'; Tyler Laubscher 23'; Jamie Booth 37'; Johnny Galloway 62'; Drew Wild 79'; Con: Stewart Cruden (2/2) 17', 24'; Ben Wyness (3/3) 38', 63', 80'	Report	Try: Chase Tiatia 4'; Joe Webber (2) 13', 52'; Mathew Skipwith-Garland 19'; Kaleb Trask (2) 32', 67'; Joe Johnston 35'; Con: Otere Black (5/6) 5', 14', 20', 33', 36'; Kaleb Trask (1/1) 68'; Pen: Otere Black (1/1) 40'; Kaleb Trask (1/1) 74'

Arena Manawatu, Palmerston North
Referee: Jonathan Bredin

17 October 2020
14:05 NZST

Wellington	25–20	North Harbour
Try: Billy Proctor 32'; Jackson Garden-Bachop 39'; Julian Savea 65'; Con: Jackson Garden-Bachop (2/3) 33', 66'; Pen: Jackson Garden-Bachop (2/2) 52', 60'	Report	Try: Bryn Gatland 18'; Jared Page 27'; Tomas Aoake 56'; Con: Bryn Gatland (1/3) 57'; Pen: Bryn Gatland (1/1) 13'

Wellington Regional Stadium, Wellington
Referee: James Doleman

17 October 2020
16:35 NZST

Auckland	31–10	Tasman
Try: Adrian Choat 21'; Marcel Renata 31'; AJ Lam 34'; Tumua Manu 39'; Salesi Rayasi 42'; Con: Harry Plummer (3/5) 22', 32', 43'; Pen: Harry Plummer (0/1)	Report	Try: Alex Nankivell 64'; Quentin MacDonald 80+2'; Con: Mitchell Hunt (0/2)

Eden Park, Auckland
Referee: Ben O'Keeffe

17 October 2020
19:05 NZST

Southland	9–17	Taranaki
Pen: Scott Eade (3/3) 20', 37', 41'; Greg Dyer (0/1)	Report	Try: Reuben O'Neill 12'; Jacob Ratumaitavuki-Kneepkens 58'; Con: Jayson Potroz (2/2) 13', 59'; Pen: Jayson Potroz (1/2) 45'; Cards: Chris Gawler (yellow card) 66'

Rugby Park Stadium, Invercargill
Referee: James Munro

18 October 2020
13:15 NZST

Canterbury	15–16	Waikato
Try: Luke Romano 14'; Tamaiti Williams 49'; Con: Fergus Burke (1/2) 50'; Pen: Fergus Burke (1/1) 29'; Cards: Isaiah Punivai (yellow card) 80'	Report	Try: Cortez-Lee Ratima 80'; Con: Rivez Reihana (1/1) 80'; Pen: Rivez Reihana (3/4) 7', 21', 63'; Cards: Beaudein Waaka (yellow card) 13'

Rugby League Park, Christchurch
Referee: Richard Kelly

18 October 2020
13:15 NZST

Otago	40–22	Counties Manukau
Try: Josh Timu (2) 9', 60'; Freedom Vaha'akolo 15'; Josh Dickson (2) 25', 70'; Charles Elton 77'; Con: Josh Ioane (5/6) 10', 16', 26', 61', 78'	Report	Try: Alamanda Motuga 40'; Orbyn Leger 49'; Viliami Taulani 56'; Con: Baden Kerr (2/3) 50', 57'; Pen: Baden Kerr (1/1) 13'

Forsyth Barr Stadium, Dunedin
Referee: Angus Mabey

=== Week 7 ===
23 October 2020
19:05 NZST

Otago	30–7	Northland
Try: Freedom Vaha'akolo (2) 13', 34'; Josh Hohneck 45'; Ricky Jackson 76'; Con: Jono Hickey (2/4) 46', 77'; Pen: Jono Hickey (2/3) 27', 53'	Report	Try: Rene Ranger 60'; Con: Dan Hawkins (1/1) 61'

Forsyth Barr Stadium, Dunedin
Referee: Mike Fraser

24 October 2020
14:05 NZST

Bay of Plenty	44–8	Canterbury
Try: Chase Tiatia (2) 9', 19'; Penalty try 21'; Joe Webber 56'; Kaleb Trask 64'; Scott Curry 72'; Con: Kaleb Trask (2/4) 10', 65'; Otere Black (1/1) 73'; Pen: Kaleb Trask (2/2) 14', 49'; Cards: Nathan Vella (yellow card) 58'	Report	Try: Cullen Grace 79'; Con: Brett Cameron (0/1); Pen: Fergus Burke (1/1) 16'; Cards: Sam Darry (yellow card) 21'

Tauranga Domain, Tauranga
Referee: Cameron Stone

24 October 2020
16:35 NZST

RS – Hawke's Bay	47–12	Manawatu
Try: Danny Toala 24'; Devan Flanders 33'; Caleb Makene 38'; Brendon O'Connor 40'; Ash Dixon 67'; Neria Fomai 73'; Isaia Walker-Leawere 78'; Con: Lincoln McClutchie (4/4) 25', 34', 39', 40'; Connor McLeod (2/3) 68', 79'	Report	Try: James Tofa 18'; Ben Wyness 35'; Con: Ben Wyness (1/2) 36'; Cards: Tietie Tuimauga (yellow card) 66'

McLean Park, Napier
Referee: Nick Briant

24 October 2020
19:05 NZST

North Harbour	23–22	Auckland
Try: James Little 42'; Luteru Tolai 63'; Con: Bryn Gatland (2/2) 43', 64'; Pen: Bryn Gatland (3/3) 5', 23', 40'	Report	Try: AJ Lam 13'; Tumua Manu 17'; Akira Ioane 75'; Con: Harry Plummer (2/3) 14', 76'; Pen: Harry Plummer (1/1) 39'; Cards: Zarn Sullivan (yellow card) 19'; Marcel Renata (yellow card) 61'

North Harbour Stadium, Albany
Referee: Richard Kelly

25 October 2020
14:05 NZST

Tasman	47–10	Southland
Try: Taina Fox-Matamua 21'; David Havili (2) 44', 78'; Fetuli Paea (2) 55', 72'; Mitchell Hunt 62'; Sione Havili 76'; Con: Mitchell Hunt (4/4) 22', 45', 56', 63'; Tim O'Malley (2/3) 73', 77'	Report	Try: Tony Lamborn 47'; Con: Scott Eade (1/1) 48'; Pen: Greg Dyer (1/1) 40'

Trafalgar Park, Nelson
Referee: James Doleman

25 October 2020
14:05 NZST

Counties Manukau	20–53	Wellington
Try: Latiume Fosita 31'; Jason Robertson 41'; Con: Jason Robertson (2/2) 32', 42'; Pen: Jason Robertson (2/2) 14', 28'	Report	Try: James O'Reilly (2) 16', 44'; Xavier Numia 58'; Wes Goosen 68'; Vaea Fifita (2) 72', 80'; Teariki Ben-Nicholas 78'; Con: Jackson Garden-Bachop (4/5) 45', 59', 69', 73'; Aidan Morgan (2/2) 79', 80'; Pen: Jackson Garden-Bachop (2/2) 26', 38'

Navigation Homes Stadium, Pukekohe
Referee: Daniel Waenga

25 October 2020
16:35 NZST

Waikato	27–20	Taranaki
Try: Beaudein Waaka 9'; Rivez Reihana 61'; Liam Messam 66'; Con: Fletcher Smith (1/1) 10'; Rivez Reihana (2/2) 62', 67'; Pen: Fletcher Smith (2/4) 23', 40'; Cards: Luke Jacobson (yellow card) 31'	Report	Try: Jacob Ratumaitavuki-Kneepkens (2) 32', 58'; Daniel Rona 70'; Con: Jayson Potroz (1/3) 33'; Pen: Jayson Potroz (1/1) 13'

Waikato Stadium, Hamilton
Referee: Angus Mabey

=== Week 8 ===
30 October 2020
19:05 NZST

Canterbury	16–23	Otago
Try: Mitchell Drummond 48'; Con: Brett Cameron (1/1) 49'; Pen: Fergus Burke (1/1) 33'; Brett Cameron (1/1) 68'; Drop: Brett Cameron (1/1) 56'	Report	Try: Sio Tomkinson 44'; Vilimoni Koroi 52'; Slade McDowall 72'; Con: Josh Ioane (1/3) 73'; Pen: Josh Ioane (2/2) 25', 40'

Rugby League Park, Christchurch
Referee: Brendon Pickerill

31 October 2020
14:05 NZST

Wellington	3–19	Tasman
Pen: Jackson Garden-Bachop (1/2) 66'	Report	Try: Sione Havili 29'; Te Ahiwaru Cirikidaveta 70'; Con: Mitchell Hunt (0/2); Pen: Mitchell Hunt (3/3) 9', 40', 77'

Porirua Park, Porirua
Referee: Daniel Waenga

31 October 2020
16:35 NZST

Northland	8–24	North Harbour
Try: Scott Gregory 61'; Con: Dan Hawkins (0/1); Pen: Johnny Cooper (1/1) 14'; Cards: Ross Wright (yellow card) 33'; Scott Gregory (red card) 76'	Report	Try: Luteru Tolai 29'; Bryn Gatland 40'; Fine Inisi 74'; Con: Bryn Gatland (3/3) 30', 40', 75'; Pen: Bryn Gatland (1/2) 12'; Cards: Bryn Gatland (yellow card) 57'

Okara Park, Whangārei
Referee: Cameron Stone

31 October 2020
19:05 NZST

Auckland	31–10	Waikato
Try: Salesi Rayasi (3) 21', 25', 73'; Sione Tuipulotu 80'; Con: Harry Plummer (4/4) 22', 26', 74', 81'; Pen: Harry Plummer (1/1) 70'	Report	Try: Xavier Roe 10'; Con: Fletcher Smith (1/1) 11'; Pen: Rivez Reihana (1/1) 60'

Eden Park, Auckland
Referee: James Doleman

1 November 2020
14:05 NZST

Manawatu	24–12	Southland
Try: Liam Mitchell 16'; Te Rangatira Waitokia 28'; Nigel Ah Wong 34'; Bryn Wilson 75'; Con: Ben Wyness (2/4) 17', 76'	Report	Try: Logan Crowley 22'; Greg Pleasants-Tate 55'; Con: Scott Eade (1/2) 23'; Pen: Scott Eade (0/1)

Manfeild, Feilding
Referee: Nick Hogan

1 November 2020
14:05 NZST

Bay of Plenty	22–17	Hawke's Bay
Try: Kaleb Trask (2) 6', 65'; Emoni Narawa 34'; Con: Kaleb Trask (2/3) 35', 66'; Pen: Kaleb Trask (1/1) 13'; Cards: Jordan Lay (yellow card) 15'; Ross Geldenhuys (yellow card) 79'	Report	Try: Lolagi Visinia 3'; Jonah Lowe 17'; Ash Dixon 28'; Con: Caleb Makene (1/3) 18'; Cards: Jonah Lowe (yellow card) 56'

Tauranga Domain, Tauranga
Referee: Jonathan Bredin

1 November 2020
16:35 NZST

Taranaki	27–31	Counties Manukau
Try: Stephen Perofeta 19'; Lewis Ormond 36'; Mitchell Crosswell 55'; Sean Wainui 64'; Con: Jayson Potroz (2/4) 20', 65'; Pen: Jayson Potroz (1/1) 71'	Report	Try: Jason Robertson 34'; Jonathan Taumateine 47'; Kirisi Kuridrani 50'; Etene Nanai-Seturo 77'; Con: Jason Robertson (4/4) 35', 48', 51', 78'; Pen: Jason Robertson (1/1) 40'; Cards: Clinton Malolua (yellow card) 80+5'

TET Stadium & Events Centre, Inglewood
Referee: James Munro

=== Week 9 ===
6 November 2020
19:05 NZST

Southland	32–15	Otago
Try: Tony Lamborn 4'; Matthew James 41'; Tevita Latu 66'; Talemaitoga Tuapati 77'; Con: Scott Eade (1/2) 5'; Greg Dyer (2/2) 67', 78'; Pen: Scott Eade (2/2) 33', 51'; Greg Dyer (0/1)	Report	Try: Freedom Vaha'akolo 15'; Sio Tomkinson 40'; Con: Josh Ioane (1/2) 40'; Pen: Josh Ioane (1/4) 9'

Rugby Park Stadium, Invercargill
Referee: Brendon Pickerill

7 November 2020
14:05 NZST

Auckland	24–20	Northland
Try: Salesi Rayasi (2) 53', 76'; Jarred Adams 67'; Con: Harry Plummer (3/3) 54', 68', 77'; Pen: Zarn Sullivan (1/1) 47'	Report	Try: Jone Macilai-Tori 39'; Sam Nock 56'; Jordan Olsen 73'; Con: Johnny Cooper (0/1); Wiseguy Faiane (1/2) 74'; Pen: Johnny Cooper (1/1) 12'

Eden Park, Auckland
Referee: Nick Briant

7 November 2020
16:35 NZST

North Harbour	32–5	Counties Manukau
Try: Jared Page 11'; Luteru Tolai 47'; Teague McElroy 63'; Tomas Aoake 69'; Con: Bryn Gatland (3/4) 12', 48', 64'; Pen: Bryn Gatland (2/2) 40', 73'	Report	Try: Kirisi Kuridrani 51'; Con: Jason Robertson (0/1); Cards: Alamanda Motuga (yellow card) 65'

North Harbour Stadium, Albany
Referee: Cameron Stone

7 November 2020
19:05 NZST

Tasman	0–29	Canterbury
Pen: Mitchell Hunt (0/1)	Report	Try: Ngane Punivai 4'; Josh McKay 40'; Chay Fihaki 45'; Isaiah Punivai 76'; Con: Brett Cameron (3/4) 5', 40', 46'; Pen: Chay Fihaki (0/1); Brett Cameron (1/2) 32'

Lansdowne Park, Blenheim
Referee: Mike Fraser

8 November 2020
14:05 NZST

Waikato	30–33	Bay of Plenty
Try: Quinn Tupaea (2) 27', 49'; Ollie Norris 36'; Samisoni Taukei'aho 44'; Con: Beaudein Waaka (2/4) 37', 45'; Pen: Beaudein Waaka (2/2) 19', 40'	Report	Try: Dan Hollinshead 5'; Joe Webber (2) 11', 25'; Sam Dickson 54'; Joe Johnston 80'; Con: Kaleb Trask (4/5) 6', 12', 55', 80'

Waikato Stadium, Hamilton
Referee: Richard Kelly

8 November 2020
14:05 NZST

RS – Hawke's Bay	34–18	Wellington
Try: Devan Flanders 13'; Marino Mikaele-Tu'u 18'; Stacey Ili 21'; Neria Fomai 54'; Con: Caleb Makene (3/3) 14', 19', 22'; Lincoln McClutchie (1/1) 55'; Pen: Caleb Makene (2/2) 4', 25'	Report	Try: Naitoa Ah Kuoi 57'; Kaliopasi Uluilakepa 64'; Con: Jackson Garden-Bachop (1/2) 65'; Pen: Jackson Garden-Bachop (2/2) 7', 12'

McLean Park, Napier
Referee: Daniel Waenga

8 November 2020
16:35 NZST

Manawatu	19–35	Taranaki
Try: Bryn Wilson 17'; Liam Mitchell 34'; Nigel Ah Wong 54'; Con: Ben Wyness (1/2) 35'; Stewart Cruden (1/1) 55'	Report	Try: Bradley Slater (2) 47', 50'; Jacob Ratumaitavuki-Kneepkens 56'; Lewis Ormond 60'; Con: Jayson Potroz (3/4) 48', 51', 57'; Pen: Jayson Potroz (3/3) 3', 40', 69'

Manfeild, Feilding
Referee: Angus Mabey

=== Week 10 ===
13 November 2020
19:05 NZST

Counties Manukau	25–17	Southland
Try: Sione Molia 31'; Cameron Roigard 42'; Zuriel Togiatama 78'; Con: Jason Robertson (2/3) 32', 43'; Pen: Jason Robertson (2/2) 60', 72'	Report	Try: Tevita Latu 46'; Tony Lamborn 55'; Talemaitoga Tuapati 80+1'; Con: Scott Eade (1/2) 56'; Greg Dyer (0/1); Cards: Charles Alaimalo (yellow card) 37'

Navigation Homes Stadium, Pukekohe
Referee: Michael Winter

14 November 2020
14:05 NZST

Northland	28–17	Waikato
Try: Sam Nock 12'; Lua Li 26'; Jordan Olsen 50'; Scott Gregory 63'; Con: Johnny Cooper (4/4) 13', 27', 51', 64'	Report	Try: Luke Jacobson 2'; Valynce Crosby-Te Whare 33'; Con: Beaudein Waaka (2/2) 3', 34'; Pen: Beaudein Waaka (1/1) 15'; Cards: Quinn Tupaea (yellow card) 64'

Kaikohe Rugby Football Club, Kaikohe
Referee: Mike Fraser

14 November 2020
14:05 NZST

Wellington	31–5	Manawatu
Try: Xavier Numia 30'; Pepesana Patafilo 42'; Teariki Ben-Nicholas 61'; Vince Aso 66'; Sam Smith 79'; Con: Jackson Garden-Bachop (2/4) 31', 43'; Billy Proctor (1/1) 80'; Cards: Pepesana Patafilo (yellow card) 76'	Report	Try: Josiah Maraku 25'; Con: Bryn Wilson (0/1); Cards: Drew Wild (yellow card) 57'

Wellington Regional Stadium, Wellington
Referee: Brendon Pickerill

14 November 2020
16:35 NZST

Otago	20–26	Tasman
Try: Freedom Vaha'akolo 9'; Kayne Hammington 75'; Con: Josh Ioane (2/2) 10', 76'; Pen: Josh Ioane (2/2) 27', 47'	Report	Try: Tim O'Malley 20'; Quinten Strange 59'; Con: Mitchell Hunt (2/2) 21', 60'; Pen: Mitchell Hunt (4/4) 8', 40', 42', 52'

Forsyth Barr Stadium, Dunedin
Referee: James Munro

15 November 2020
14:05 NZST

Taranaki	33–34	Hawke's Bay
Try: Lewis Ormond 11'; Stephen Perofeta 26'; Kaylum Boshier 33'; Tom Florence 55'; Con: Jayson Potroz (2/4) 27', 34'; Pen: Jayson Potroz (3/3) 19', 22', 40'	Report	Try: Solomone Funaki (2) 23', 43'; Tom Parsons 48'; Penalty try 66'; Devan Flanders 69'; Con: Caleb Makene (2/3) 24', 44'; Connor McLeod (0/1); Pen: Caleb Makene (1/1) 4'; Connor McLeod (0/1)

TET Stadium & Events Centre, Inglewood
Referee: Jonathan Bredin

15 November 2020
14:05 NZST

Bay of Plenty	37–33	North Harbour
Try: Kurt Eklund 32'; Joe Webber 35'; Jeff Thwaites 53'; Emoni Narawa 55'; Nathan Vella 70'; Con: Kaleb Trask (3/5) 36', 54', 71'; Pen: Kaleb Trask (2/2) 24', 80'; Cards: Kurt Eklund (yellow card) 19'	Report	Try: Luteru Tolai (2) 5', 45'; Tomas Aoake 14'; Penalty try 19'; Zane Turner 73'; Con: Bryn Gatland (3/4) 6', 15', 46'

Tauranga Domain, Tauranga
Referee: Richard Kelly

15 November 2020
16:35 NZST

Canterbury	34–33	Auckland
Try: Chay Fihaki 15'; Dallas McLeod 44'; Ngane Punivai 47'; Luke Romano 57'; Oliver Jager 66'; Con: Brett Cameron (3/5) 45', 48', 67'; Pen: Chay Fihaki (1/2) 74'	Report	Try: Salesi Rayasi (2) 2', 21'; Tanielu Teleʻa 5'; Presley Tufuga 69'; Terrell Peita 71'; Con: Harry Plummer (4/5) 6', 22', 70', 72'; Cards: Presley Tufuga (yellow card) 37'

Rugby League Park, Christchurch
Referee: Nick Briant

== Play-offs ==
Championship

Semi-finals
1	Hawke's Bay	59
4	Taranaki	23
2	Otago	19
3	Northland	32

Final
1	Hawke's Bay	36
3	Northland	24

Premiership

Semi-finals
1	Auckland	23
4	Waikato	18
2	Tasman	19
3	Bay of Plenty	10

Final
1	Auckland	12
2	Tasman	13

=== Semi-finals ===
==== Championship ====
20 November 2020
19:05 NZST

Otago	19–32	Northland
Try: Nareki 29' m Timu 40' c Tomkinson 63' c Con: Ioane (2/3) 40', 64'; Pen: Ioane (0/1)	Report	Try: Macilai-Tori 8' c Olsen 54' m Nock 71' c Matich 76' c Con: Cooper (1/1) 9'; Faiane (2/3) 72', 77'; Pen: Cooper (2/2) 14', 46'; Cards: M. Wright (yellow card) 26'

Forsyth Barr Stadium, Dunedin
Referee: Mike Fraser

21 November 2020
16:35 NZST

Hawke's Bay	59–23	Taranaki
Try: Cridge 21' c Funaki 30' c Rakete-Stones 33' c Dixon (3) 37' c, 44' c, 60' c Fakatava 53' c McLeod 70' c Con: Makene (1/1) 22'; McClutchie (7/7) 31', 34', 38', 45', 54', 61', 71'; Pen: McClutchie (1/1) 41'	Report	Try: Halls 26' m Riccitelli 67' c Brighouse 75' m Con: Potroz (1/3) 68'; Pen: Potroz (2/2) 5', 15'

McLean Park, Napier
Referee: Nick Briant

==== Premiership ====
21 November 2020
14:05 NZST

Auckland	23–18	Waikato
Try: Rayasi 25' m Teleʻa 43' c Manu 51' m Con: Plummer (1/3) 44'; Pen: Sullivan (1/1) 9'; Plummer (1/3) 12'	Report	Try: Taukei'aho 4' m Thomson 14' c Con: Waaka (1/2) 15'; Pen: Waaka (2/4) 21', 56'

Eden Park, Auckland
Referee: Brendon Pickerill

21 November 2020
19:05 NZST

Tasman	19–10	Bay of Plenty
Try: MacDonald 20' m Fainga'anuku 25' m Con: Hunt (0/2); Pen: Hunt (3/3) 2', 58', 73'; Cards: S. Havili (yellow card) 34'	Report	Try: Webber 37' c Con: Trask (1/1) 38'; Pen: Trask (1/1) 51'

Trafalgar Park, Nelson
Referee: Richard Kelly

=== Finals ===
==== Championship ====
27 November 2020
19:05 NZST

Hawke's Bay	36–24	Northland
Try: Lowe (2) 12' m, 44' c Fomai (2) 16' c, 51' c Visinia 31' m Dixon 59' m Con: McClutchie (2/3) 17', 45'; Fakatava (0/1); Makene (1/2) 52'	Report	Try: Li 8' c Grant 20' m Robinson 28' m Tua 75' c Con: Hawkins (1/3) 9'; Cooper (1/1) 76'

McLean Park, Napier
Attendance: 7,500
Referee: James Doleman

==== Premiership ====
28 November 2020
18:35 NZST

Auckland	12–13	Tasman
Pen: Plummer (3/3) 4', 30', 44'; Sullivan (1/1) 37'	Report	Try: MacDonald 40' c Con: D. Havili (1/1) 40'; Pen: D. Havili (2/4) 18', 70'

Eden Park, Auckland
Attendance: 13,131
Referee: Nick Briant

FB	15	Zarn Sullivan	(yellow card) 49'
RW	14	AJ Lam		(substituted off) 66'
OC	13	Tumua Manu
IC	12	Tanielu Teleʻa		(substituted off) 57'
LW	11	Salesi Rayasi
FH	10	Harry Plummer
SH	9	Jonathan Ruru		(substituted off) 78'
N8	8	Sione Tuipulotu
OF	7	Niko Jones
BF	6	Adrian Choat		(substituted off) 57'
RL	5	Jack Whetton		(substituted off) 57'
LL	4	Scott Scrafton
TP	3	Angus Ta'avao (c)	(yellow card) 40'	(substituted off) 78'
HK	2	Leni Apisai		(substituted off) 57'
LP	1	James Lay		(substituted off) 52'
Replacements:
HK	16	Mike Sosene-Feagai		(substituted on) 57'
PR	17	Jarred Adams		(substituted on) 52'
PR	18	Marcel Renata		(substituted on) 78'
LK	19	Hamish Dalzell		(substituted on) 57'
FL	20	Presley Tufuga		(substituted on) 57'
SH	21	Taufa Funaki		(substituted on) 78'
FH	22	Simon Hickey		(substituted on) 57'
FB	23	Jordan Trainor		(substituted on) 66'

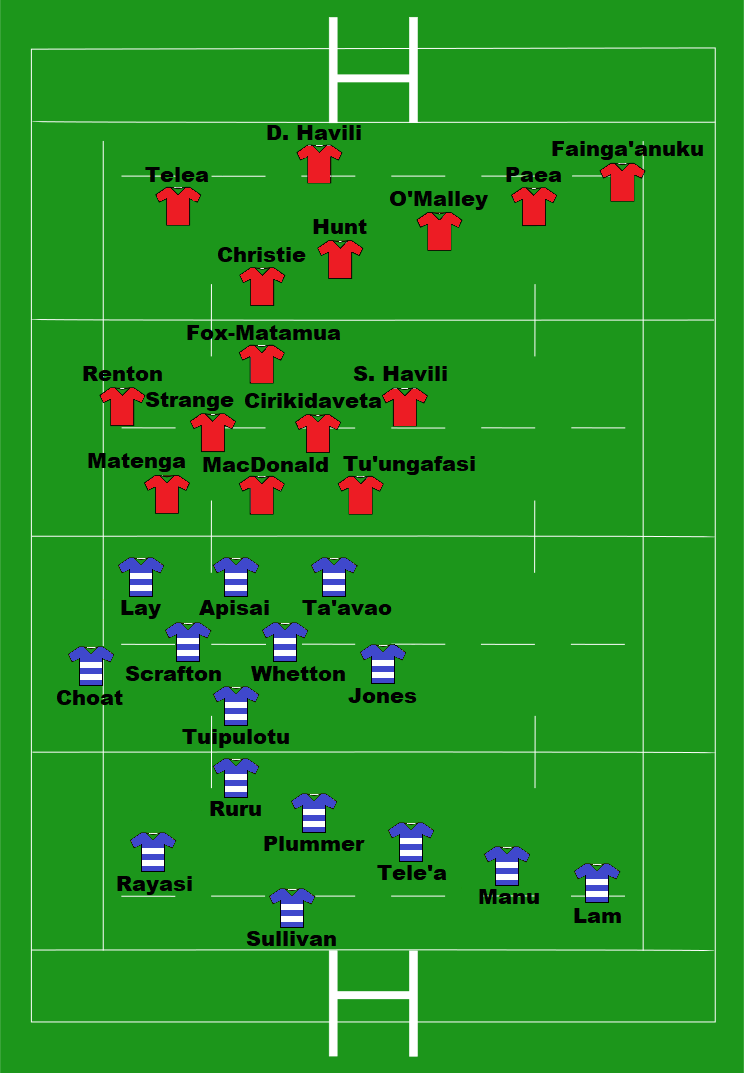

FB	15	David Havili (c)
RW	14	Mark Tele'a	(substituted off) 66'
OC	13	Fetuli Paea
IC	12	Tim O'Malley
LW	11	Leicester Fainga'anuku
FH	10	Mitchell Hunt	(substituted off) 15'
SH	9	Finlay Christie
N8	8	Taina Fox-Matamua	(substituted off) 66'
OF	7	Sione Havili
BF	6	Hugh Renton
RL	5	Quinten Strange
LL	4	Te Ahiwaru Cirikidaveta
TP	3	Sam Matenga	(substituted off) 41'
HK	2	Quentin MacDonald	(substituted off) 78'
LP	1	Isi Tu'ungafasi	(substituted off) 66'
Replacements:
HK	16	Sam Moli	(substituted on) 78'
PR	17	Ryan Coxon	(substituted on) 66'
PR	18	Isaac Salmon	(substituted on) 41'
LK	19	Isaac Ross
FL	20	Anton Segner	(substituted on) 66'
SH	21	Dwayne Polataivao
CE	22	Kieron Fonotia	(substituted on) 15'
WG	23	Tima Fainga'anuku	(substituted on) 66'

== Statistics ==
=== Leading point scorers ===
No.	Player	Team	Points	Average	Details
1	Bryn Gatland	North Harbour	119	11.90	3 T, 25 C, 18 P, 0 D
2	Mitchell Hunt	Tasman	97	8.10	1 T, 25 C, 14 P, 0 D
3	Jayson Potroz	Taranaki	95	9.50	3 T, 16 C, 16 P, 0 D
4	Jackson Garden-Bachop	Wellington	88	8.80	1 T, 25 C, 11 P, 0 D
5	Josh Ioane	Otago	88	8.80	1 T, 19 C, 15 P, 0 D
6	Harry Plummer	Auckland	74	6.20	0 T, 25 C, 8 P, 0 D
7	Kaleb Trask	Bay of Plenty	72	8.00	5 T, 13 C, 7 P, 0 D
8	Salesi Rayasi	Auckland	70	7.80	14 T, 0 C, 0 P, 0 D
9	Jason Robertson	Counties Manukau	57	7.13	2 T, 13 C, 7 P, 0 D
10	Lincoln McClutchie	Hawke's Bay	57	4.75	0 T, 21 C, 5 P, 0 D

Source: The weekly reviews of the matches published on provincial.rugby (see "Report" in the individual match scoring stats).

=== Leading try scorers ===
No.	Player	Team	Tries	Average
1	Salesi Rayasi	Auckland	14	1.60
2	Ash Dixon	Hawke's Bay	9	0.82
3	Jacob Ratumaitavuki-Kneepkens	Taranaki	8	0.73
4	Luteru Tolai	North Harbour	7	0.70
5	Freedom Vaha'akolo	Otago	7	0.70
6	AJ Lam	Auckland	7	0.64
7	Joe Webber	Bay of Plenty	7	0.64
8	Jared Page	North Harbour	6	0.86
9	David Havili	Tasman	6	0.55
10	Neria Fomai	Hawke's Bay	5	0.63

Source: The weekly reviews of the matches published on provincial.rugby (see "Report" in the individual match scoring stats).

=== Points by week ===
Team	1		2		3		4		5		6		7		8		9		10		Total		Average	
Auckland	38	6	21	39	50	12	20	16	29	28	31	10	22	23	31	10	24	20	33	34	299	198	29.90	19.80
Bay of Plenty	29	36	17	14	10	32	16	20	7	33	53	35	44	8	22	17	33	30	37	33	268	258	26.80	25.80
Canterbury	43	29	22	23	19	20	31	26	34	10	15	16	8	44	16	23	29	0	34	33	251	224	25.10	22.40
Counties Manukau	24	41	17	31	15	24	36	30	13	36	22	40	20	53	31	27	5	32	25	17	208	331	20.80	33.10
Hawke's Bay	10	16	31	17	20	19	28	9	10	46	33	17	47	12	17	22	34	18	34	33	264	209	26.40	20.90
Manawatu	26	43	25	36	12	50	30	36	10	34	35	53	12	47	24	12	19	35	5	31	198	377	19.80	37.70
North Harbour	29	43	19	41	10	11	40	24	46	10	20	25	23	22	24	8	32	5	33	37	276	226	27.60	22.60
Northland	43	26	21	54	24	15	35	25	18	14	17	33	7	30	8	24	20	24	28	17	221	262	22.10	26.20
Otago	6	38	36	25	30	19	9	28	35	34	40	22	30	7	23	16	15	32	20	26	244	247	24.40	24.70
Southland	16	10	14	17	11	10	9	10	14	18	9	17	10	47	12	24	32	15	17	25	144	193	14.40	19.30
Taranaki	36	29	23	22	19	30	25	35	28	29	17	9	20	27	27	31	35	19	33	34	263	265	26.30	26.50
Tasman	41	24	54	21	34	17	24	40	33	7	10	31	47	10	19	3	0	29	26	20	288	202	28.80	20.20
Waikato	53	28	41	19	17	34	10	9	36	13	16	15	27	20	10	31	30	33	17	28	257	230	25.70	23.00
Wellington	28	53	39	21	32	10	26	31	34	35	25	20	53	20	3	19	18	34	31	5	289	248	28.90	24.80

Source: Mitre 10 Cup Fixtures and Results 2020

=== Tries by week ===
Team	1		2		3		4		5		6		7		8		9		10		Total		Average	
Auckland	5	0	3	6	8	2	2	1	5	3	5	2	3	2	4	1	3	3	5	5	43	25	4.30	2.50
Bay of Plenty	4	5	2	2	1	5	1	2	1	5	7	5	6	1	3	3	5	4	5	4	35	36	3.50	3.60
Canterbury	6	2	3	3	3	3	4	4	5	2	2	1	1	6	1	3	4	0	5	5	34	29	3.40	2.90
Counties Manukau	3	5	2	5	2	3	5	5	1	5	3	6	2	7	4	4	1	4	3	3	26	47	2.60	4.70
Hawke's Bay	2	2	5	2	3	3	4	0	1	7	4	2	7	2	3	3	4	2	4	4	37	27	3.70	2.70
Manawatu	2	6	4	5	2	8	5	5	2	5	5	7	2	7	4	2	3	4	1	5	30	54	3.40	5.40
North Harbour	2	6	3	6	1	1	4	3	7	1	3	3	2	3	3	1	4	1	4	5	33	30	3.30	3.00
Northland	6	2	3	8	3	2	4	3	2	2	2	4	1	4	1	3	3	3	4	2	29	33	2.90	3.30
Otago	0	5	5	4	4	3	0	4	5	4	6	3	4	1	3	1	2	4	2	2	31	31	3.10	3.10
Southland	2	2	2	2	1	1	0	1	2	2	0	2	1	7	2	4	4	2	3	3	17	26	1.70	2.60
Taranaki	5	4	3	3	3	4	3	4	3	5	2	0	3	3	4	4	4	3	4	4	34	34	3.40	3.40
Tasman	5	3	8	3	5	3	3	4	5	1	2	5	7	1	2	0	0	4	2	2	39	26	3.90	2.60
Waikato	5	4	6	3	3	5	1	0	5	1	1	2	3	3	1	4	4	5	2	4	31	31	3.10	3.10
Wellington	4	5	6	3	5	1	4	4	4	5	3	3	7	2	0	2	2	4	5	1	40	30	4.00	3.00

For	Against

Source: The weekly reviews of the matches published on provincial.rugby (see "Report" in the individual match scoring stats).

=== Sanctions ===
Player	Team	Red	Yellow	Sent off match(es)
Sio Tomkinson	Otago	1	0	vs Auckland
Fa'asiu Fuatai	Bay of Plenty	1	0	vs Wellington
Slade McDowall	Otago	1	0	vs Hawke's Bay
Scott Gregory	Northland	1	0	vs North Harbour
Tietie Tuimauga	Manawatu	0	2	vs Auckland and Hawke's Bay
Zarn Sullivan	Auckland	0	2	vs North Harbour and Tasman
Liam Coltman	Otago	0	1	vs Auckland
Jack Regan	Otago	0	1	vs Auckland
Nehe Milner-Skudder	Manawatu	0	1	vs Northland
Aaron Carroll	Bay of Plenty	0	1	vs Taranaki
Greg Pleasants-Tate	Southland	0	1	vs Bay of Plenty
Samuel Slade	Counties Manukau	0	1	vs Hawke's Bay
Matiaha Martin	Counties Manukau	0	1	vs Hawke's Bay
Xavier Numia	Wellington	0	1	vs Bay of Plenty
Nic Mayhew	North Harbour	0	1	vs Southland
Gerard Cowley-Tuioti	North Harbour	0	1	vs Southland
Filo Paulo	Manawatu	0	1	vs Auckland
Lua Li	Northland	0	1	vs Counties Manukau
Stephen Perofeta	Taranaki	0	1	vs Northland
Rob Rush	Northland	0	1	vs Taranaki
Luke Romano	Canterbury	0	1	vs Wellington
Isaac Salmon	Tasman	0	1	vs North Harbour
Sam Matenga	Tasman	0	1	vs North Harbour
Vilimoni Koroi	Otago	0	1	vs Hawke's Bay
Jason Long	Hawke's Bay	0	1	vs North Harbour
Conán O'Donnell	Counties Manukau	0	1	vs Waikato
Chase Tiatia	Bay of Plenty	0	1	vs Tasman
Kara Pryor	Northland	0	1	vs Southland
Chris Gawler	Taranaki	0	1	vs Southland
Beaudein Waaka	Waikato	0	1	vs Canterbury
Isaiah Punivai	Canterbury	0	1	vs Waikato
Sam Darry	Canterbury	0	1	vs Bay of Plenty
Nathan Vella	Bay of Plenty	0	1	vs Canterbury
Marcel Renata	Auckland	0	1	vs North Harbour
Luke Jacobson	Waikato	0	1	vs Taranaki
Ross Wright	Northland	0	1	vs North Harbour
Bryn Gatland	North Harbour	0	1	vs Northland
Jordan Lay	Bay of Plenty	0	1	vs Hawke's Bay
Jonah Lowe	Hawke's Bay	0	1	vs Bay of Plenty
Ross Geldenhuys	Bay of Plenty	0	1	vs Hawke's Bay
Clinton Malolua	Counties Manukau	0	1	vs Taranaki
Alamanda Motuga	Counties Manukau	0	1	vs North Harbour
Charles Alaimalo	Southland	0	1	vs Counties Manukau
Quinn Tupaea	Waikato	0	1	vs Northland
Drew Wild	Manawatu	0	1	vs Wellington
Pepesana Patafilo	Wellington	0	1	vs Manawatu
Kurt Eklund	Bay of Plenty	0	1	vs North Harbour
Presley Tufuga	Auckland	0	1	vs Canterbury
Mathew Wright	Northland	0	1	vs Otago
Sione Havili	Tasman	0	1	vs Bay of Plenty
Angus Ta'avao	Auckland	0	1	vs Tasman

== Ranfurly Shield ==
=== Pre-season challenges ===
For the 2020 pre-season Canterbury confirmed challenges against Buller and North Otago. It was later revealed the match between Canterbury and North Otago would be rescheduled and the only defence to go ahead due to the COVID-19 pandemic.

28 August 2020
14:05 NZST

Canterbury	71–7	North Otago
Try: McLeod 6' c Knewstubb 12' m Brewis 16' c Punivai 18' c Harmon 21' c Mataele (2) 27' c, 48' m Fihaki 40' m Darry (2) 52' c, 56' c Poihipi 79' c Con: Cameron (8/11) 7', 17', 19', 22', 28', 53', 57', 80'	Preview; Report	Try: Hayward 70' c Con: Phipps (1/1) 71'

Rugby League Park, Christchurch
Attendance: 0
Referee: Daniel Waenga
