= Medbury School =

School in Christchurch, New Zealand

Location
- 109 Clyde Road, Fendalton, Christchurch; 43.5212°S 172.5879°E

Information
- Type: Private boys' preparatory school, Years 1–8
- Motto: Play the Game
- Established: 1923
- Ministry of Education Institution no.: 4118
- Chairman: Richard Austin
- Headmaster: Dave Scott
- Enrolment: 372 (July 2026)
- Socio-economic decile: 10
- Website: medbury.school.nz

Medbury School, located in Christchurch, New Zealand, is an independent day and boarding preparatory school for boys between Years 1 to 8 (ages 5 to 13).

== History ==
Medbury School was established in 1923 by the Chennells family after purchasing a property of 20,000 square metres (220,000 ft^{2}) and a large family home called "Ripsford". The school began with only nine boys cared for by the Chennells. By 1925, the number of boys attending the school had grown to approximately 50. In 1955, the Chennells retired; by this time there were 111 boys at the school. Development of facilities has occurred as the school has grown and the school celebrated 100 years in 2023.

== Admission ==
Boys are accepted into Medbury School at any level between the ages of five and thirteen at the discretion of the Headmaster.

== Notable alumni ==
- Marcus Armstrong – racing driver in the IndyCar Series
- Zach Gallagher – Crusaders and Canterbury professional rugby player
- Sam Neill – actor
- Isaiah Punivai – Crusaders and Canterbury professional rugby player
- Ngane Punivai – Highlanders and Canterbury professional rugby player
- Teddy Tahu Rhodes – baritone
- Joe Bell - Viking Fotballklubb and All Whites professional football player
