= Vaha'akolo =

Vaha'akolo is a surname. Notable people with the surname include:

- Katelyn Vaha'akolo (born 2000), New Zealand rugby league and union player
- Freedom Vaha'akolo (born 1997), New Zealand rugby union player
