= Isaac Salmon =

New Zealand rugby union player

- Full name: Isaac Arapata Salmon
- Born: 5 September 1996 (age 30) Christchurch, New Zealand
- Height: 180 cm (5 ft 11 in)
- Weight: 118 kg (18 st 8 lb; 260 lb)
- School: Nelson College

Rugby union career
- Position: Prop
- Current team: New Orleans Gold, Hawke's Bay
Senior career
Years	Team	Apps	(Points)
2017–2022, 2024	Tasman	43	(0)
2018	Blues	0	(0)
2022–2023	Toronto Arrows	26	(5)
2023, 2025–	Hawke's Bay	3	(0)
2024–	New Orleans Gold	16	(0)
- Correct as of 16 May 2025

Isaac Arapata Salmon (born 5 September 1996) is a New Zealand rugby union player, who plays as a prop. He currently plays for New Orleans Gold in Major League Rugby (MLR) in the United States and Hawke's Bay in the Bunnings NPC. Salmon was educated at Nelson College from 2011 to 2014.

== Career ==
While not included in the Tasman squad that was named for the 2017 Mitre 10 Cup season, Salmon made his debut for the Mako on 27 August 2017 against Manawatu. He went on to play 6 games for the province in his first season.

He was named in the Blues squad for the 2018 Super Rugby season, but did not play.

Salmon was part of the Tasman team that won the Mitre 10 Cup in 2019 for the first time. He was again part of the Mako side that won their second premiership title in a row in 2020. Tasman again made the final in 2021, with Salmon coming off the bench, but the Mako this time lost 20–23 to Waikato.

In 2022 and 2023, Salmon played for Toronto Arrows in Major League Rugby.

Salmon was signed by Hawke's Bay for the 2023 Bunnings NPC season. Due to injury, he only played 3 games for the province.

On 13 November 2023, New Orleans Gold announced that the club had signed Salmon for the 2024 Major League Rugby season. He made his debut for the side on 9 March 2024 in Round 2 against Anthem Rugby Carolina.
