= Taina Fox-Matamua =

New Zealand rugby union player

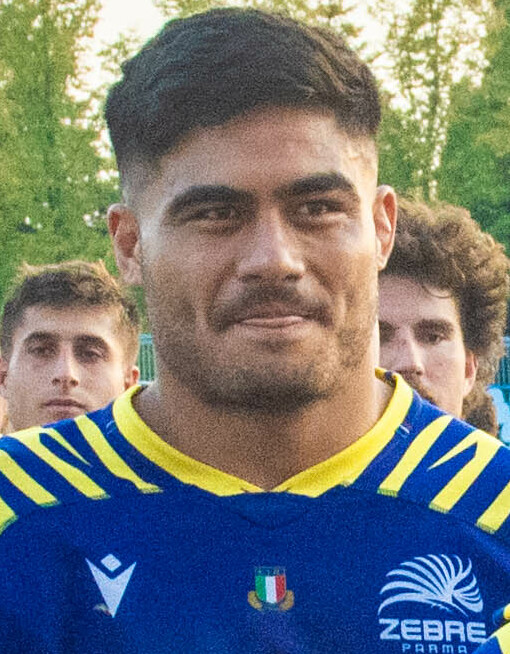
- Full name: Taina Fox-Matamua
- Born: 30 January 1997 (age 29) Auckland, New Zealand
- Height: 190 cm (6 ft 3 in)
- Weight: 109 kg (17 st 2 lb; 240 lb)
- School: St Peter's College
- Notable relative: Nepia Fox-Matamua (brother)

Rugby union career
- Position: Number 8
Senior career
Years	Team	Apps	(Points)
2018–2020	Tasman	12	(10)
2022–2024	Zebre Parma	29	(20)
- Correct as of 15 September 2024

Taina J. Fox-Matamua (born 30 January 1997) is a New Zealand rugby union player. His position is Number 8.

== Tasman ==
Fox-Matamua made his debut for Tasman in Round 5 of the 2018 Mitre 10 Cup against Taranaki at Trafalgar Park in Nelson. He played 5 games for Tasman in 2018 and 1 game in 2019. In September 2020 he was named in the Tasman Mako squad for the 2020 Mitre 10 Cup. He played 6 games for the Mako in 2020 and started in their 12–13 win over Auckland in the final as they won their second premiership title in a row. Fox-Matamua did not play a game during the 2021 Bunnings NPC as Tasman made the final before losing 23–20 to Waikato. He played for Italian team Zebre Parma in United Rugby Championship.
