= Greg Pleasants-Tate =

NZ rugby union player (born 1991)

- Full name: Gregory William Pleasants-Tate
- Born: 12 May 1991 (age 35) Whanganui, New Zealand
- Height: 180 cm (5 ft 11 in)
- Weight: 118 kg (260 lb; 18 st 8 lb)
- School: Takapuna Grammar School

Rugby union career
- Position(s): Hooker, Prop
- Current team: Southland
Senior career
Years	Team	Apps	(Points)
2011–2012	Bay of Plenty	11	(5)
2013–2014	North Harbour	20	(15)
2015	Blues	1	(0)
2015–2017	Auckland	25	(30)
2016–2018	Highlanders	18	(20)
2018	Canterbury	5	(20)
2019–	Southland	99	(20)
- Correct as of 8 September 2020
International career
Years	Team	Apps	(Points)
2011	New Zealand U20	2	(5)
- Correct as of 8 September 2020

Greg Pleasants-Tate (born 12 May 1991) is a New Zealand rugby union player who has played as a hooker for Bay of Plenty, North Harbour, Auckland, Canterbury and Southland in New Zealand's domestic Mitre 10 Cup and the Blues and Highlanders in the international Super Rugby competition.

== Early career ==
Born in Whanganui, a city on the west coast of New Zealand's North Island, Pleasants-Tate moved north during his schooling and was educated at Takapuna Grammar School on the North Shore of Auckland where he played first XV rugby while also turning out for North Harbour at age-group level.

== Senior career ==
Despite coming through the youth ranks at North Harbour, Pleasants-Tate made his senior ITM Cup debut with the Bay of Plenty Steamers during the 2011 season. He played 2 seasons of rugby in Rotorua and notched up 11 appearances before switching back to Harbour in 2013 where he played all 10 games in a dismal campaign for the men from Auckland's North Shore in which they would finish bottom of the Championship table.

2014 was not a great season for North Harbour, finishing 5th on the Championship log, however Pleasants-Tate put in some strong performances in the number 1 jersey, starting all 10 games during the regular season and scoring 2 tries. That would prove to be his final season in North Shore City and he made the short move to join ITM Cup Premiership side Auckland for the 2015 ITM Cup. He played 10 times as a hooker for Auckland in his first year with them as they reached the Premiership final before losing out 25–23 to Canterbury. 2016 did not prove to be as strong a year for either party, with Auckland ending up 5th in the Premiership table, outside of the playoff places and injury holding Pleasants-Tate back in the latter part of the season and restricting him to just 6 appearances during which time he managed to score 3 tries.

== Super Rugby ==
Four seasons of solid performances at domestic level saw him finally earn a crack at Super Rugby when the Auckland-based Blues named him in their wider training group for the 2015 Super Rugby season. Able to cover both number 1 and 2 jerseys, but having played the previous domestic season as a hooker for Auckland, Pleasants-Tate had to vie with Matt Moulds to provide back up to All Blacks; Keven Mealamu and James Parsons and subsequently only made 1 substitute appearance against the Rebels during what would be his only season with the Blues.

Now focusing almost exclusively on playing hooker, Pleasants-Tate found himself surplus to requirements with the Blues and moved south to Dunedin ahead of the 2016 Super Rugby season to take a place as a member of the Highlanders wider training group, providing cover for Liam Coltman and Ash Dixon, the franchise's 2 established hookers. The Highlanders were defending Super Rugby champions in 2016, but were unable to hold on to their crown, losing out to the Lions in Johannesburg in the competition's semi-finals. However, Pleasants-Tate, had a productive year and made 7 substitute appearances.

Tony Brown replaced the Japan-bound Jamie Joseph as Highlanders head-coach ahead of the 2017 season and he retained Pleasants-Tate in the squad for the year.

== International career ==
Pleasants-Tate was a member of the New Zealand Under-20 side which won the 2011 IRB Junior World Championship in Italy, playing 2 times and scoring 1 try.

== Career Honours ==
New Zealand Under-20

- IRB Junior World Championship - 2011

== Super Rugby Statistics ==
As of 31 March 2017

Season	Team	Games	Starts	Sub	Mins	Tries	Cons	Pens	Drops	Points	Yel	Red
2015	Blues	1	0	1	10	0	0	0	0	0	0	0
2016	Highlanders	9	0	9	100	1	0	0	0	0	0	0
Total		10	0	10	110	1	0	0	0	0	0	0
