= Liam Allen =

New Zealand rugby union player

- Born: New Zealand

Rugby union career
- Position: Lock / Flanker
- Current team: Canterbury, Crusaders
Senior career
Years	Team	Apps	(Points)
2020–	Canterbury	2	(0)
2021–	Crusaders	0	(0)
- Correct as of 25 May 2021

Liam Allen is a New Zealand rugby union player who plays for the Crusaders in Super Rugby. His playing position is lock or flanker. He joined the Crusaders during the Super Rugby Trans-Tasman competition as injury cover. He represented Canterbury in the 2020 Mitre 10 Cup joining the side as a replacement player ahead of round 8 and making two appearances.
