= Sam Matenga =

NZ rugby union player

- Full name: Samuel Israel Matenga
- Born: 8 May 1998 (age 28) Gisborne, New Zealand
- Height: 186 cm (6 ft 1 in)
- Weight: 116 kg (18 st 4 lb; 256 lb)
- School: Gisborne Boys' High School

Rugby union career
- Position: Prop
- Current team: Tasman, Blues
Senior career
Years	Team	Apps	(Points)
2019–	Tasman	60	(0)
2022–2024	Seattle Seawolves	44	(25)
2025	Crusaders	3	(0)
2026–	Blues	9	(0)
- Correct as of 11 May 2026

Samuel Israel Matenga (born 8 May 1998) is a New Zealand rugby union player who plays for Tasman in the Bunnings NPC competition and the Blues in Super Rugby. His position is prop.

== Tasman ==
Matenga made his debut for Tasman in Round 5 of the 2019 Mitre 10 Cup against Counties Manukau at Pukekohe Stadium in Auckland. He played 3 games for Tasman in 2019. In September 2020 he was named in the Tasman Mako squad for the 2020 Mitre 10 Cup. Matenga was part of the side as the Mako went on to win their second premiership title in a row. He had a stand out season in the 2021 Bunnings NPC as Tasman again made the premiership final, this time losing to Waikato 23–20.
