= Rob Cobb =

New Zealand rugby union player

- Born: 8 April 1999 (age 27) New Zealand
- Height: 189 cm (6 ft 2 in)
- Weight: 117 kg (258 lb; 18 st 6 lb)

Rugby union career
- Position: Prop
- Current team: Houston SaberCats, Northland
Senior career
Years	Team	Apps	(Points)
2019–2022	Waikato	27	(5)
2023–	Houston SaberCats	24	(10)
2023–	Northland	17	(10)
- Correct as of 4 October 2024
Super Rugby
Years	Team	Apps	(Points)
2020	Chiefs	1	(0)
- Correct as of 4 October 2024
International career
Years	Team	Apps	(Points)
2018–2019	New Zealand U20	6	(0)
- Correct as of 4 October 2024

Rob Cobb (born 8 April 1999) is a New Zealand rugby union player who plays for the Northland in the Bunnings NPC. He also plays for the Houston SaberCats in Major League Rugby (MLR). His position is prop.

He was part of the Chiefs wider squad in 2020.
