= Adrian Choat =

New Zealand rugby union player

- Full name: Adrian Joseph Choat
- Born: 20 November 1997 (age 28) New Zealand
- Height: 190 cm (6 ft 3 in)
- Weight: 100 kg (220 lb; 15 st 10 lb)
- School: Liston College

Rugby union career
- Position: Flanker
- Current team: Secom Rugguts
Senior career
Years	Team	Apps	(Points)
2018–2025	Auckland	32	(15)
2019–2020	Bristol Bears	0	(0)
2021–2025	Blues	22	(5)
2025-	Secom Rugguts	11	(10)
- Correct as of 15 March 2023
International career
Years	Team	Apps	(Points)
2017	New Zealand U20	2	(5)
- Correct as of 25 February 2021

Adrian Choat (born 20 November 1997 in New Zealand) is a New Zealand rugby union player who plays for the Blues in Super Rugby. His playing position is flanker. He was announced in the Blues side for Round 1 of the 2021 Super Rugby Aotearoa season. He was also a member of the Auckland 2020 Mitre 10 Cup squad. He was part of the Blues team which won the 2024 Super Rugby Pacific title.
