= Quentin MacDonald =

NZ Maori international rugby union player

- Full name: Quentin Joseph Reuben William Jordan MacDonald
- Born: 25 September 1988 (age 38) Blenheim, New Zealand
- Height: 181 cm (5 ft 11 in)
- Weight: 101 kg (223 lb; 15 st 13 lb)
- School: Marlborough Boys' College

Rugby union career
- Position: Hooker
Senior career
Years	Team	Apps	(Points)
2007–2015, 2020–2024	Tasman	126	(115)
2010–2012, 2023–2024	Crusaders	27	(15)
2013, 2016	Blues	20	(0)
2014	Munster	3	(0)
2015	Chiefs	13	(0)
2016–2020	Oyonnax	100	(130)
- Correct as of 13 October 2024
International career
Years	Team	Apps	(Points)
2007	New Zealand U19	5	(5)
2008	New Zealand U20	5	(10)
2012, 2015	Māori All Blacks	5	(0)
- Correct as of 13 October 2024

Quentin Joseph Reuben William Jordan MacDonald (born 25 September 1988) is a former New Zealand rugby union player who played for Tasman in the Bunnings NPC. His position was hooker. He also played Super Rugby for the Crusaders, Blues and the Chiefs.

== Early life ==
Born in Blenheim, MacDonald was educated at Marlborough Boys' College and played for the school's top side in 2005 and 2006.

== Tasman ==
MacDonald played 78 games for Tasman between 2007 and 2015 before going to play overseas. He returned to the Mako ahead of the 2020 Mitre 10 Cup. MacDonald played 11 games and scored 3 tries for the side in the 2020 season as they went on to win the competition for the second time in a row. MacDonald became only the third player to play 100 games for the province during the 2021 Bunnings NPC in the final against Waikato, the Mako however could not get across the line, losing 23–20.

== Super Rugby ==
MacDonald played 24 games for the Crusaders between 2010 and 2012. He made the move north to the Blues ahead of the 2013 Super Rugby season. He had one season with the Chiefs in 2015, playing 13 games. MacDonald returned to the Blues for the 2016 Super Rugby season finishing his time at the side with 20 matches. He returned to the Crusaders as an injury replacement during the Super Rugby Trans-Tasman season in 2021 but did not play. He made his Super Rugby return for the Crusaders in Round 3 of the 2023 Super Rugby Pacific season against the Drua where he started and scored 2 tries in a loss for the Crusaders.

== Overseas ==
MacDonald signed with Irish side Munster on a three month contract in 2014 where he played 3 games. In 2016 he moved to France where he played for Oyonnax. He spent five seasons with the side playing a total of 100 games.

== International ==
MacDonald played for the New Zealand national under-20 rugby union team in 2008, playing 5 games. He made the Māori All Blacks in 2012 and played 3 games but didn't make the team again until 2015 where he played another 2 games.

== Personal life ==
MacDonald is a New Zealander of Māori descent (Rangitāne descent).
