= AJ Lam =

New Zealand rugby union player

- Full name: Alexander Lam
- Born: 29 July 1998 (age 28) New Zealand
- Height: 188 cm (6 ft 2 in)
- Weight: 100 kg (220 lb; 15 st 10 lb)
- Notable relative(s): Ben Lam (brother); Jack Lam (cousin); Seilala Lam (cousin); Pat Lam (uncle); Joel Lam (cousin)

Rugby union career
- Position(s): Wing, Centre
- Current team: Auckland, Blues
Senior career
Years	Team	Apps	(Points)
2019–	Auckland	52	(120)
2021–	Blues	69	(125)
- Correct as of 2 May 2026
International career
Years	Team	Apps	(Points)
2022	All Blacks XV	3	(15)
2025	ANZAC XV	1	(0)
- Correct as of 5 November 2025

Alexander Lam (born 29 July 1998 in New Zealand) is a New Zealand rugby union player who plays for the Blues in Super Rugby. He was educated at St Peter's College, Auckland. His regular playing position is wing. He was named in the Blues squad for the 2021 Super Rugby Aotearoa season. He was also a member of the Auckland 2020 Mitre 10 Cup squad.
