= Xavier Roe =

New Zealand rugby union player

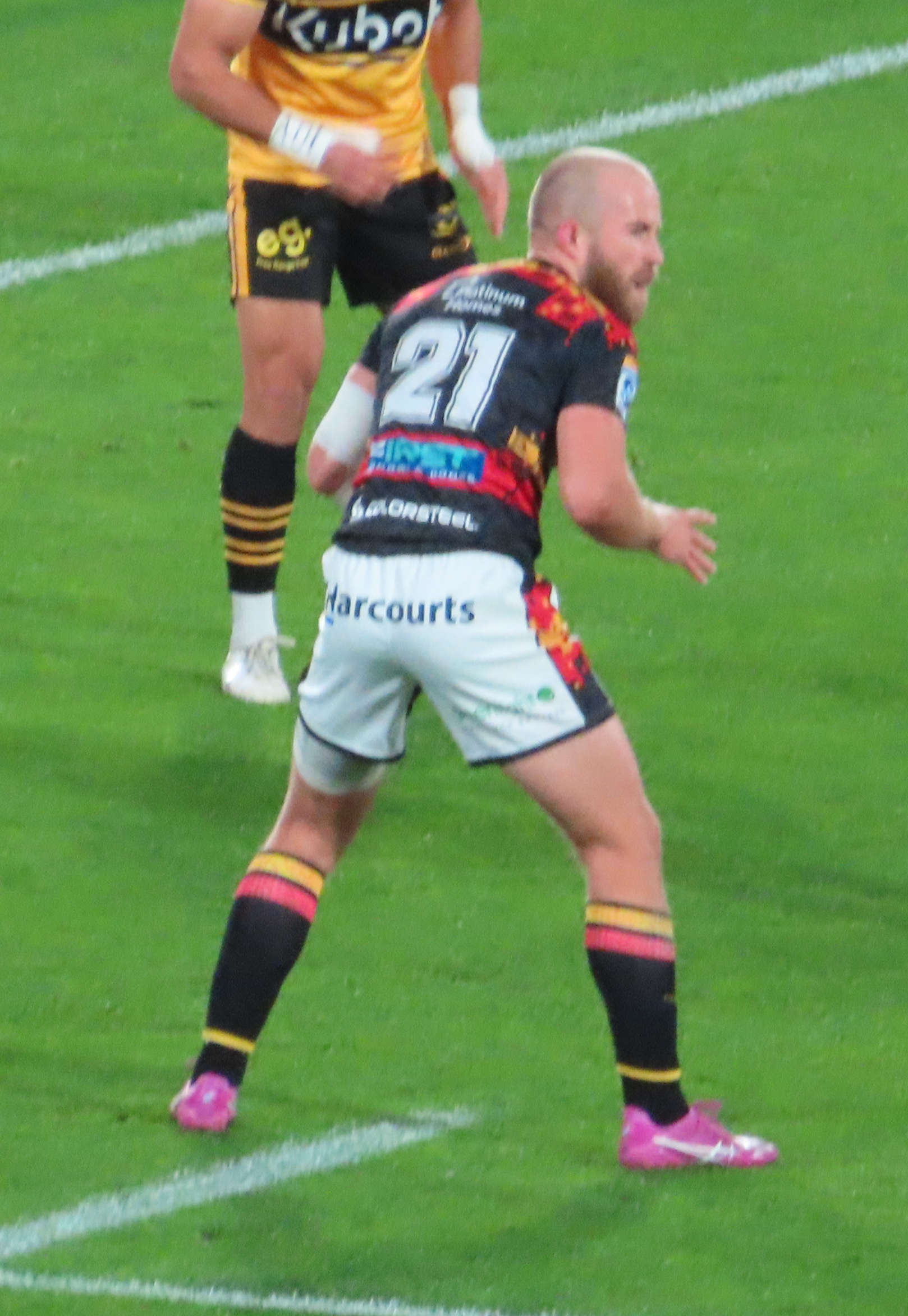
- Roe playing for the Chiefs in the 2026 Super Rugby Pacific final
- Born: 13 December 1998 (age 27) New Zealand
- Height: 179 cm (5 ft 10 in)
- Weight: 85 kg (187 lb; 13 st 5 lb)
- School: Hamilton Boys' High School

Rugby union career
- Position: Scrum-half
- Current team: Sale sharks
Senior career
Years	Team	Apps	(Points)
2018–2019	Taranaki	6	(0)
2020–2026	Waikato	58	(60)
2021–2026	Chiefs	57	(40)
- Correct as of 15 May 2026
International career
Years	Team	Apps	(Points)
2018	New Zealand U20	3	(10)
- Correct as of 3 December 2020

Xavier Roe (born 13 December 1998) is a New Zealand rugby union player who plays for Sale Sharks in the Gallagher Premiership. Prior to his move to England, he played for the Chiefs in Super Rugby. His playing position is scrum-half. He was named in the Chiefs squad for the 2021 Super Rugby Aotearoa season. He was also a member of the Waikato 2020 Mitre 10 Cup squad.

== Club career ==
It was announced on 20 May 2026 that Roe would leave New Zealand to play his club rugby in Manchester, England at Premiership side Sale Sharks. Roe signed a two-year deal from the 2026–27 season.
