= Lua Li =

New Zealand rugby union player

- Full name: Luatangi Li
- Born: 11 May 1991 (age 35) Auckland, New Zealand
- Height: 180 cm (5 ft 11 in)
- Weight: 120 kg (265 lb; 18 st 13 lb)
- School: Massey High School

Rugby union career
- Position: Prop
- Current team: Northland
Senior career
Years	Team	Apps	(Points)
2018–2019	North Harbour	17	(10)
2019	Blues	4	(0)
2020–2021, 2024–	Northland	16	(25)
2021	San Diego Legion	0	(0)
2022–2023	Gordon	11	(5)
- Correct as of 16 September 2024
International career
Years	Team	Apps	(Points)
2021	Tonga	1	(0)
- Correct as of 16 September 2024

Luatangi Li (born 11 May 1991) is a New Zealand born Tongan rugby union player. His position is prop. He has previously played 4 games for the Blues in 2019. Li was named in the Tonga national rugby union team squad to play New Zealand and Samoa in July 2021.
