= Liam Coltman =

New Zealand rugby union player (born 1990)

- Full name: Liam James Coltman
- Born: 25 January 1990 (age 36) New Plymouth, New Zealand
- Height: 185 cm (6 ft 1 in)
- Weight: 109 kg (240 lb; 17 st 2 lb)
- School: Francis Douglas Memorial College

Rugby union career
- Position: Hooker
- Current team: Otago
Senior career
| Years | Team | Apps | (Points) |
| 2010–2022 2024– | Otago | 101 | (55) |
| 2013–2022 | Highlanders | 138 | (40) |
| 2022–2024 | Lyon | 46 | (20) |
| 2025 | Utah Warriors | 16 | (50) |
| 2026 | Canon Eagles | 10 | (15) |
- Correct as of 5 April 2023
International career
| Years | Team | Apps | (Points) |
| 2010 | New Zealand U20 | 5 | (5) |
| 2016–2019 | New Zealand | 8 | (0) |
| 2020 | South Island | 1 | (0) |
- Correct as of 5 June 2022

Liam James Coltman (born 25 January 1990) is a New Zealand rugby union player who plays as a hooker for Lyon in Frances's domestic competition Top 14.

Coltman has also previously captained Otago in the NPC, and has played eight tests for the All Blacks, New Zealand's international rugby team, since his debut in 2016.

== Early career ==
Born and raised in New Plymouth on the west coast of New Zealand's North Island, Coltman was educated at Francis Douglas Memorial College in his hometown, where he played first XV rugby. Coltman's All Black teammate Beauden Barrett was also his teammate in their first XV. During his high school years, he represented his local province, Taranaki at under-16 and under-18 level.

After graduating high school, he moved south to Dunedin to attend the University of Otago and while there he began playing for Alhambra Union in Dunedin's Premier club rugby competition as well as turning out for Otago's under-18, under-19 and academy sides.

== Senior career ==
Coltman first played provincial rugby for Otago during the 2010 ITM Cup, debuting in a match away to Counties Manukau and making six appearances during what was a dismal year for the Razorbacks in which they finished 14th and last on the log to consign themselves to the Championship division in the newly formatted 2011 ITM Cup.

Aged just 21 in 2011, he began to establish himself as Otago's first choice in the number 2 jersey, playing in all 10 regular season games, including 6 starts as the men from Dunedin finished 3rd in the Championship, just missing out on the play off spots as New Zealand's domestic season was cut short to accommodate the 2011 Rugby World Cup which was taking place in the country.

Otago finished 2nd on the Championship log in both 2012 and 2013 and were defeated in the final by Counties Manukau in 2012 before going down to Hawke's Bay in the semi-finals the following year. Coltman played 22 of the Razorbacks' 23 games across the 2 seasons and this included 18 starts.

2014 was a difficult year for Otago, with an inexperienced side finishing 6th out of 7 teams on the log to miss out on the playoffs altogether, although they did bounce back the following year, ending up in 3rd place before being bettered by Wellington in the semi-finals, their 3rd playoff defeat in 4 years. Coltman played 18 games across the 2 seasons and scored 3 tries.

He spent a large part of the 2016 Mitre 10 Cup season training with the All Blacks so was only able to feature in 4 matches for the Razorbacks as they topped the Championship log and made it all the way to the playoff final before being surprisingly defeated at home by North Harbour.

== Super Rugby ==
A member of the Highlanders wider training group in 2011 and 2012, Coltman finally made the full squad ahead of the 2013 Super Rugby season. Serving as back up to experienced All Black, Andrew Hore, he managed an impressive 13 appearances, mainly from the replacements bench, during his first campaign of Super Rugby. This apprenticeship served him well as Hore's retirement at the end of 2013 left Coltman as the Highlanders first choice hooker for 2014 Super Rugby season and he started 11 times as his franchise reached the tournament quarter finals before being defeated 31–27 by the Sharks in Durban.

2015 was an historic year for the Highlanders as they lifted their first ever Super Rugby title after a 21–14 victory over the Hurricanes in the final. Ash Dixon had been brought in from Hawke's Bay to provide competition for the number 2 shirt, however Coltman started 15 games to Dixon's 4 and featured in all 19 fixtures during the 'Landers maiden Super Rugby winning season. The competition between Coltman and Dixon continued through 2016 and with the Highlanders unable to hold on to their title, losing 42–30 to the Lions in the semi-finals, Coltman only started 6 games through the year out of a total of 10 appearances.

Coltman started for the Highlanders against the touring British & Irish Lions team on 13 June 2017, contributing heavily towards the Highlanders' narrow 23–22 win and scoring a try in the 59th minute. Coltman was replaced by Greg Pleasants-Tate in the 67th minute.

== International ==
Coltman was a member of the New Zealand Under-20 side which won the 2010 IRB Junior World Championship held in Argentina, scoring 1 try in 5 matches.

He was called up to the All Blacks squad to provide injury cover for Nathan Harris during the 2016 Rugby Championship, but didn't get any game time during the tournament as Dane Coles and Codie Taylor remained fit and in good form. However, during the 2016 end-of-year rugby union internationals, he made his debut, coming on as a 65th minute replacement for Codie Taylor in a 68–10 victory against Italy in Rome.

Coltman failed to make the field for the All Blacks during 2017, due to injury, but was re-selected for the three-test 2018 Steinlager series against France after an outstanding Super Rugby season. Coltman replaced Codie Taylor in the 71st minute of the series' final test, on 23 June 2018. Coltman did not make a mistake as the All Blacks beat France 49–14, winning the series 3–0.

After a series of excellent performances throughout the 2019 Super Rugby season, Coltman overtook Nathan Harris as New Zealand's third-choice hooker. He made two appearances off the bench during the 2019 Rugby Championship, with Dane Coles still struggling with injuries.

On 28 August 2019, All Blacks Head Coach, Steve Hansen, named Coltman in New Zealand's 31-man squad for the 2019 Rugby World Cup. Coltman made his first-ever start for New Zealand during the pool stages, in a 63–0 win over Canada. Although Coltman didn't play in any other tests during the pool stages, he replaced Dane Coles off the bench during the 24th minute of the Bronze Final. Coltman was one of the star performers of the match, with New Zealand beating Wales 40–17 in the bronze final, claiming third place at the World Cup.

== Honours ==
New Zealand Under-20

- IRB Junior World Championship – 2010

Highlanders

- Super Rugby – 2015

New Zealand

- Rugby World Cup / Webb Ellis Cup
  - Third-place: 2019

Utah Warriors

- All Major League Ruby first team (2025)

== Super Rugby statistics ==
As of 13 November 2021

| Season | Team | Games | Starts | Sub | Mins | Tries | Cons | Pens | Drops | Points | Yel | Red |
|---|---|---|---|---|---|---|---|---|---|---|---|---|
| 2013 | Highlanders | 13 | 3 | 10 | 361 | 0 | 0 | 0 | 0 | 0 | 0 | 0 |
| 2014 | Highlanders | 14 | 11 | 3 | 676 | 0 | 0 | 0 | 0 | 0 | 0 | 0 |
| 2015 | Highlanders | 19 | 15 | 4 | 935 | 0 | 0 | 0 | 0 | 0 | 0 | 0 |
| 2016 | Highlanders | 10 | 6 | 4 | 385 | 0 | 0 | 0 | 0 | 0 | 0 | 0 |
| 2017 | Highlanders | 15 | 15 | 0 | 908 | 1 | 0 | 0 | 0 | 5 | 0 | 0 |
| 2018 | Highlanders | 15 | 10 | 5 | 649 | 2 | 0 | 0 | 0 | 10 | 0 | 0 |
| 2019 | Highlanders | 15 | 15 | 0 | 896 | 3 | 0 | 0 | 0 | 15 | 0 | 0 |
| 2020 | Highlanders | 13 | 5 | 10 | 429 | 0 | 0 | 0 | 0 | 0 | 0 | 0 |
| 2021 | Highlanders | 14 | 2 | 12 | 377 | 1 | 0 | 0 | 0 | 5 | 0 | 0 |
| Total | | 127 | 82 | 45 | 5,571 | 7 | 0 | 0 | 0 | 35 | 0 | 0 |
