= Jack Regan (rugby union) =

Irish rugby union player

- Born: Jack Regan; 9 May 1997 (age 29) Birr, County Offaly, Ireland
- Height: 1.98 m (6 ft 6 in)
- Weight: 114 kg (17 st 13 lb; 251 lb)
- University: University College Dublin

Rugby union career
- Position: Lock
Youth career
- Birr
Amateur team(s)
Years	Team	Apps	(Points)
2015–2017	UCD		
2017–2020	Ballynahinch		
2020	Dunedin Sharks		
Senior career
Years	Team	Apps	(Points)
2019–2020	Ulster	1	(0)
2021	Highlanders	2	(0)
2021–2023	Ospreys	1	(0)
2023–2024	Toyota Shuttles		
- Correct as of 5 April 2021
Provincial / State sides
Years	Team	Apps	(Points)
2020	Otago	11	(5)
International career
Years	Team	Apps	(Points)
2017	Ireland U20	10	(0)
- Correct as of 30 June 2017

Jack Regan (born 9 May 1997) is an Irish rugby union player, currently playing for the Highlanders in Super Rugby and the Mitre 10 Cup side Otago Rugby. He previously played for Irish Pro14 team Ulster Rugby. He plays as a lock.

== Career ==
Regan started playing rugby underage at Birr RFC in County Offaly and was part of the Leinster under-age set up.

=== Ulster ===
Regan made his senior competitive debut for Ulster in their 54–42 defeat against Leinster in the 2018–19 Pro14 on 20 December 2019, coming on as a replacement in this match. In March 2020 he was released by Ulster.

=== Otago ===
Regan moved to New Zealand where he joined the Dunedin Sharks and was subsequently signed by Otago. He made his debut in Round 1 of the 2020 season against Auckland at Forsyth Barr Stadium.

=== Highlanders ===
In February 2021 Regan was called into the Highlanders squad as injury cover for some pre-season games. Regan made his Super Rugby debut for the Highlanders on 26 February in a 13–26 defeat to the Crusaders. He made his second appearance in the Highlanders first win of the season against the Chiefs in Hamilton.
