= Jordan Olsen =

New Zealand rugby union player

- Born: 27 April 1990 (age 36) Whangārei, New Zealand
- Height: 180 cm (5 ft 11 in)
- Weight: 103 kg (227 lb; 16 st 3 lb)
- School: Kamo High School

Rugby union career
- Position: Hooker
Senior career
Years	Team	Apps	(Points)
2014–2021, 2023	Northland	66	(50)
- Correct as of 30 September 2023
International career
Years	Team	Apps	(Points)
2019	Canada A	1	(0)
- Correct as of 30 September 2023

Jordan D. Olsen (born 27 April 1990) is a former New Zealand born Canadian rugby union player. His position was hooker. He represented Canada A at international level. He qualified for Canada through his mother who is Canadian.
