= Sam Stewart (rugby union) =

New Zealand rugby union player

- Born: 10 April 1995 (age 31) Southland, New Zealand
- Height: 191 cm (6 ft 3 in)
- Weight: 114 kg (251 lb; 17 st 13 lb)
- School: Southland Boys' High School

Rugby union career
- Position: Hooker
- Current team: Southland
Senior career
Years	Team	Apps	(Points)
2017, 2022	Southland	8	(0)
2018–2020	Manawatu	29	(15)
2021	Canterbury	4	
- Correct as of 1 August 2021

Sam Stewart (born 10 April 1995 in New Zealand) is a New Zealand rugby union player who has played for Manawatu, Canterbury and Southland in the National Provincial Championship. His primary playing position is hooker.

His twin brother Jordan Stewart also played rugby for Southland.

In the 2022 season Sam played for Southland again and scored a try in their win over Counties-Manukau.
