= Fetuli Paea =

Tongan rugby union player

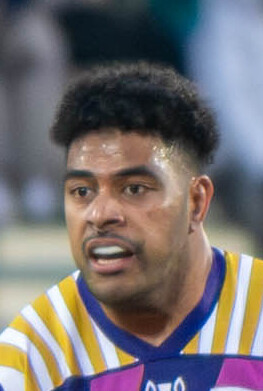
- Born: 16 August 1994 (age 32) Nuku'alofa, Tonga
- Height: 189 cm (6 ft 2 in)
- Weight: 95 kg (209 lb; 14 st 13 lb)

Rugby union career
- Position(s): Centre, Wing
- Current team: Dragons
Senior career
Years	Team	Apps	(Points)
2019–2022	Tasman	31	(20)
2020	Crusaders	4	(0)
2021–2023	Highlanders	23	(10)
2023–2025	Zebre	29	(5)
2025-	Dragons	11	(0)
- Correct as of 3 June 2025
International career
Years	Team	Apps	(Points)
2016–	Tonga	7	(10)
- Correct as of 4 August 2024
National sevens team
Years	Team		Comps
2016−2019	Tonga		3
- Correct as of 21 August 2021

Fetuli M. A. Paea (born 16 August 1994) is a Tongan rugby union player. He has represented Tonga internationally and has also represented the nation in Rugby sevens. His playing position is Centre or Wing. He currently plays for Welsh team Dragons in United Rugby Championship.

== Career ==
Paea made his debut for Tasman in Round 3 of the 2019 Mitre 10 Cup against Manawatu coming off the bench in a 64-3 win for the Mako. He played 9 games for the Mako in 2019, 8 off the bench as the side went unbeaten to claim their first Mitre 10 Cup title. Following his impressive impact from the bench for Tasman Paea was named in the Crusaders squad for the 2020 Super Rugby season. He made his Super Rugby debut during Super Rugby Aotearoa later in the year against the Highlanders, he played 4 games for the Christchurch based side during their Super Rugby Aotearoa campaign which they went on to win. Looking for more game time Paea moved south to the Highlanders for the 2021 Super Rugby season. Paea was again part of the Mako side that won the 2020 Mitre 10 Cup. Paea was named in the Moana Pasifika squad to play the Maori All Blacks in late 2020, starting in the number 13 jersey in a 28-21 loss. Paea missed the entire 2021 Super Rugby season with injury as the Highlanders made the Super Rugby Trans-Tasman final. In Round 2 of the 2021 Bunnings NPC Paea suffered another injury while playing for Tasman against Auckland, ruling him out for the rest of the competition. The Mako went on to make the final before losing 23–20 to Waikato.

Paea signed for Zebre Parma in May 2023 ahead of the 2023–24 United Rugby Championship. He made his debut in Round 1 of the 2023–24 season against the Ulster. He played with Zebre Parma until 2025.

In June 2025 he signed for Welsh team Dragons in URC.

After the experience also with Tonga sevens team, in May 2022 Paea was named in the Tonga squad for the first time since 2017 for the Pacific Nations Cup.
