= Viliami Taulani =

Tongan rugby union player (born 1997)

- Born: 17 January 1997 (age 29) Tonga
- Height: 191 cm (6 ft 3 in)
- Weight: 118 kg (260 lb; 18 st 8 lb)
- School: Manurewa High School

Rugby union career
- Position: Flanker
- Current team: Harlequins
Senior career
Years	Team	Apps	(Points)
2016–21	Counties Manukau	20	(10)
2021	Chiefs	2	(0)
2022–2023	Harlequins	12	(10)
2022	→London Scottish	1	(0)
- Correct as of 5 Mar 2022
International career
Years	Team	Apps	(Points)
2021–	Tonga	4	(5)
- Correct as of 14 Jul 2021

Viliami Taulani (born 17 January 1997) is a Tongan rugby union player who plays for Harlequins in the Premiership Rugby. His playing position is flanker.

== Early life ==
Taulani was educated in New Zealand at Manurewa High School in the southern suburbs of Auckland. He played with the school team, playing in the local high school championship, and was one of the most prominent players. He was part of his school's first team, which won the Auckland Championship in 2015. He also played rugby sevens with his team.

== Career ==
=== Club ===
After completing his schooling, he played with Patumahoe RFC in the Counties Manukau Rugby Championship. At the same time, he represented the Counties Manukau province under-19 team. He also played with the Under-20 team, then the Development team, of the Chiefs franchise in 2016.

The 19-year-old was retained in the Counties Manukau senior roster for the 2016 National Provincial Championship (NPC) season. He played his first match at the professional level on 18 August 2016 against North Harbor. He played five games in his first season, all as a substitute.

Taulani played little with Counties Manukau in the 2017 and 2018 NPC seasons (two and three games played respectively), before finally breaking through in the 2020 season.

After this first full season at provincial level, he played the pre-season of Super Rugby with the Chiefs franchise, and he was aligned in friendly matches. Later in the season, he was granted a short-term contract with his team, following several injuries in the workforce. He played his first game in Super Rugby Aotearoa on 1 May 2021, against the Blues. He played a second match a month later, during the Super Rugby Trans-Tasman, against the Waratahs.

In August 2021 he joined Harlequins in the Premiership Rugby ahead of the 2021–22 season. He played twelve games in his first season, mostly in a back- up role for England international Alex Dombrandt. He also played one game with Harlequins partner club London Scottish in the Second Division.

In the 2023 NPC season he played for the Counties Manukau Steelers.

=== International ===
Taulani was selected for the first time with the Tonga team in June 2021. He earned his first cap against New Zealand on 3 July 2021 in Auckland. He then played the double confrontation against Samoa, then the match against the Cook Islands, all in the context of qualifying for the 2023 World Cup.
