= Freedom Vaha'akolo =

New Zealand rugby union player

Freedom Vahaakolo
- Born: 18 July 1997 (age 29) Auckland, New Zealand
- Height: 185 cm (6 ft 1 in)
- Weight: 95 kg (209 lb; 14 st 13 lb)
- School: Auckland Grammar School, Massey High School, Mount Albert Grammar School
- Notable relative: Katelyn Vaha'akolo (sister) Jordan Vaha’akolo (brother) Summer Vaha’akolo (sister)

Rugby union career
- Position: Wing
- Current team: Hawke's Bay
Senior career
| Years | Team | Apps | (Points) |
| 2020–2022 | Otago | 30 | (80) |
| 2021–2022 | Highlanders | 3 | (0) |
| 2024– | Hawke's Bay | 9 | (15) |
- Correct as of 10 October 2024
- Rugby league career

Playing information
- Position: Centre
Club
| Years | Team | Pld | T | G | FG | P |
|---|---|---|---|---|---|---|
| 2023 | Point Chevalier Pirates | 16 | 12 | 0 | 0 | 48 |
Representative
| Years | Team | Pld | T | G | FG | P |
| 2023 | Auckland Vulcans | 4 | 3 | 0 | 0 | 12 |

Freedom Vaha'akolo (born 18 July 1997) is a New Zealand rugby union player, who currently plays as a wing for Hawke's Bay in New Zealand's domestic National Provincial Championship (NPC) competition.

Vaha'akolo previously played for the Highlanders in Super Rugby. He was for the first time announced in the Highlanders side for Round 5 of the 2021 Super Rugby Aotearoa season.

He has also represented Otago in the NPC from 2020 to 2022.

Vaha'akolo also played rugby league. In 2023, he joined the Point Chevalier Pirates rugby league club in Auckland, debuting for them on 15 April 2023. He played 16 games for them scoring 12 tries making him the second equal highest try scorer in Fox Memorial games for the season. Vaha'akolo was then selected for the Auckland Vulcans representative side, playing four games and scoring three tries in the New Zealand Rugby League Premiership competition. One of his tries came in the 70-6 win over Counties-Manukau in the final.
