= Teariki Ben-Nicholas =

New Zealand rugby union player

- Born: 18 July 1995 (age 31) New Zealand
- Height: 1.94 m (6 ft 4 in)
- Weight: 108 kg (238 lb)
- School: King’s College

Rugby union career
- Position(s): Flanker, Number 8
- Current team: Kurita Water Gush
Senior career
Years	Team	Apps	(Points)
2016	Tasman	1	(0)
2017–2020	Wellington	38	(35)
2021–2023	Castres	18	(10)
2023-	Kurita Water Gush	34	(40)
- Correct as of 24 June 2022
Super Rugby
Years	Team	Apps	(Points)
2020–2021	Highlanders	13	(10)
- Correct as of 19 June 2021

Teariki Ben-Nicholas (born 18 July 1995) is a New Zealand rugby union player of Cook Islands descent, who plays for Kurita Water Gush Akishima in the Japan Rugby League One Division Three. His playing position is flanker. He has signed for the Highlanders squad in 2020.

== International career ==
Ben-Nicholas was selected for the New Zealand national under-20 rugby union team in 2015 and took part in the Oceania Rugby Under 20 Championship, where he played two matches. He was not selected for the subsequent 2015 World Rugby Under 20 Championship because of his ongoing legal case.

In May 2018, he was selected for the New Zealand Universities team for a tour of Japan.
