= Aaron Carroll (rugby union) =

New Zealand rugby union player

- Born: 11 October 1993 (age 33) Tauranga, New Zealand
- Height: 193 cm (6 ft 4 in)
- Weight: 112 kg (247 lb; 17 st 9 lb)
- School: Tauranga Boys' College

Rugby union career
- Position(s): Lock, Flanker, Number 8
- Current team: Kyuden Voltex
Senior career
Years	Team	Apps	(Points)
2017	Thames Valley	6	(15)
2018–2020	Bay of Plenty	25	(15)
2020	Blues	6	(0)
2021-2023	US Carcassonne	41	(5)
2023-	Kyuden Voltex	24	(10)
- Correct as of 27 February 2024

Aaron Carroll (born in New Zealand) is a New Zealand rugby union player who plays for Kyuden Voltex in Super Rugby. His playing position is lock. He was a late addition to the Blues squad for the 2020 season.
