= Jared Page =

New Zealand rugby union player

- Full name: Jared Page
- Born: 22 July 1993 (age 33) Auckland, New Zealand
- Height: 185 cm (6 ft 0.8 in)
- Weight: 98 kg (216 lb; 15 st 6 lb)
- School: Pukekohe High School

Rugby union career
- Position: Fullback
- Current team: North Harbour, Blues
Senior career
Years	Team	Apps	(Points)
2014–2015, 2021-	Counties Manukau	30	(177)
2019–2020	North Harbour	15	(43)
2020	Blues	2	
- Correct as of 13 September 2022

Jared Page (born 22 July 1993 in New Zealand) is a New Zealand rugby union player who plays for the Blues in Super Rugby. His playing position is fullback. He has signed for the Blues squad in 2020.
