= Orbyn Leger =

New Zealand rugby union player who

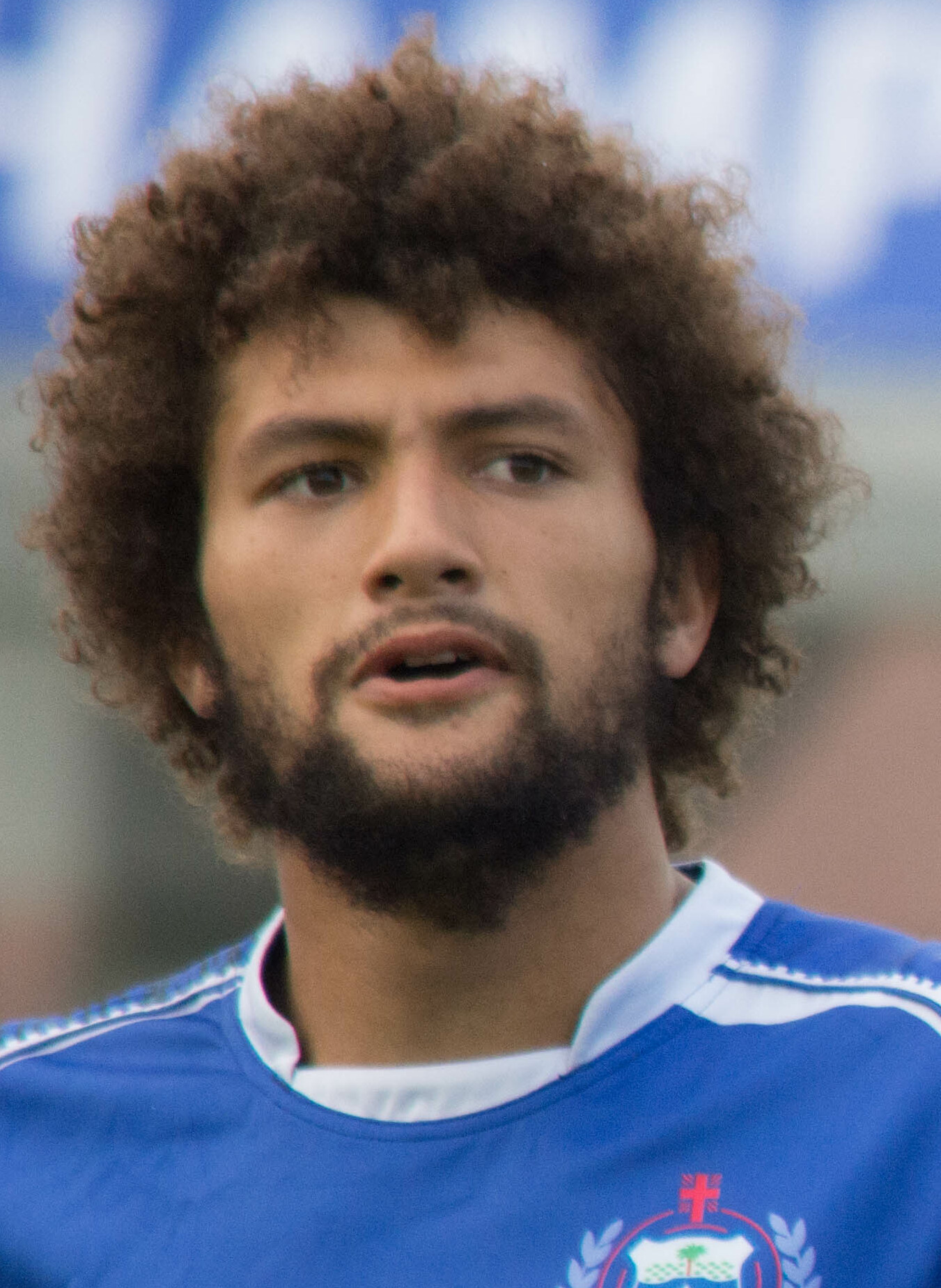
- Born: 13 March 1997 (age 29) Auckland, New Zealand
- Height: 184 cm (6 ft 0 in)
- Weight: 90 kg (198 lb; 14 st 2 lb)
- School: Hamilton Boys' High School

Rugby union career
- Position(s): Centre, First five-eighth
- Current team: Shimizu Blue Sharks
Senior career
Years	Team	Apps	(Points)
2017–2022	Counties Manukau	27	(27)
2018	Blues	7	(5)
2019–2020	Chiefs	3	(0)
2021-2022	Hurricanes	3	(0)
2022–2024 2026–	Shimizu Blue Sharks	31	(116)
2024–2026	NEC Green Rockets	27	(118)
- Correct as of 20 June 2020
International career
Years	Team	Apps	(Points)
2015	Samoa U20	5	(5)
2016–2017	New Zealand U20	11	(19)
- Correct as of 20 June 2020

Orbyn Leger (born 13 March 1997) is a New Zealand rugby union player who has represented the Blues, Chiefs and Hurricanes in the Super Rugby competition.

Leger is a first five-eighth for Karaka who went to Hamilton Boys' High School. He began his playing career in 2015 at first five-eighth for the Samoa Under 20s side before switching allegiance to New Zealand for the 2016 and 2017 editions of the tournament. Leger is one of only a handful of players to attend 3 different Under 20s World Championships.

He is the son of former Counties Manukau midfielder Gus Leger who played 15 tests for Tonga and represented New Zealand at softball. Leger also played Touch Rugby and Softball at Regional and National representative level. He is of Tongan, Māori, Samoan and Fijian descent.

Leger continued his rise through the ranks in New Zealand rugby with another stellar performance with the U20s and Counties Manukau which saw him being included in the Blues 2018 Super Rugby training squad. He made his Super Rugby debut playing at center for the Blues against the Sunwolves in Japan in 2018. He then made 7 appearances for the Blues in his debut Super Rugby season in 2018.

Leger has obtained 9 Super Rugby caps and is currently training with the Hurricanes squad for 2021. He was also the co-captain of the 2020 Counties Manukau Steelers alongside team-mate, Lyndon Dunshea.
