= Slade McDowall =

New Zealand rugby union player

- Born: 8 March 1998 (age 28) New Zealand
- Height: 1.83 m (6 ft 0 in)
- Weight: 101 kg (15 st 13 lb; 223 lb)

Rugby union career
- Position: Flanker
- Current team: New England Free Jacks
Senior career
Years	Team	Apps	(Points)
2017–2021	Otago	38	(25)
2022-2024	Manawatu	11	(10)
- Correct as of 24 August 2024
Super Rugby
Years	Team	Apps	(Points)
2020–	Highlanders	0	(0)
- Correct as of 8 March 2020

Slade McDowall (born 8 March 1998 in New Zealand) is a New Zealand rugby union player who plays for the New England Free Jacks in Major League Rugby (MLR) and for the Highlanders in Super Rugby. His playing position is flanker.

McDowall was announced in the Highlanders touring squad of South Africa and Argentina in March 2020.
