= Waimana Riedlinger-Kapa =

New Zealand rugby union player

- Born: 4 May 1998 (age 28) New Zealand
- Height: 192 cm (6 ft 4 in)
- Weight: 106 kg (234 lb; 16 st 10 lb)

Rugby union career
- Position(s): Lock, Flanker
- Current team: Honda Heat
Senior career
Years	Team	Apps	(Points)
2018–2021	Auckland	11	(5)
2020	Blues	0	(0)
2022–2023	Hanazono Kintetsu Liners	16	(10)
2023–	Honda Heat	25	(0)
- Correct as of 16 October 2026

Waimana Riedlinger-Kapa (Japanese: ワイマナ・カパ; born 2 September 1998) is a New Zealand rugby union player who currently plays as a lock and flanker for the Honda Heat in the Japan Rugby League One.

== Career ==
Ahead of the 2025–26 Japan Rugby League One season, Riedlinger-Kapa was appointed team captain of the Honda Heat. The following year, in October 2026, Riedlinger-Kapa, at the Honda Heat since 2023, was announced as the team captain ahead of the 2026–27 Japan Rugby League One season. He was also named as one of several players in the team's leadership group which included South African Test player Franco Mostert.
