= Luteru Tolai =

New Zealand rugby union player

- Born: 1 June 1998 (age 28) Auckland, New Zealand
- Height: 1.79 m (5 ft 10 in)
- Weight: 119 kg (262 lb; 18 st 10 lb)
- School: St. Peter's College

Rugby union career
- Position: Hooker
- Current team: Biarritz
Senior career
Years	Team	Apps	(Points)
2018–2022	North Harbour	37	(45)
2020–2021	Blues	11	(0)
2022–2023	Moana Pasifika	19	(10)
2023–	Biarritz	0	(0)
- Correct as of 28 August 2023
International career
Years	Team	Apps	(Points)
2022–	Samoa	10	(0)
- Correct as of 14 September 2025

Luteru Tolai (born 1 June 1998) is a professional rugby union player who plays as a hooker for Pro D2 club Biarritz. Born in New Zealand, he represents Samoa at international level after qualifying on ancestry grounds.

== Early life ==
Tolai was educated at St Peter's College, Auckland and played rugby for the school.

== Club career ==
He was named in the Blues side in round 5 in 2020. He also plays for the Super Rugby franchise, Moana Pasifika.
