= Liam Mitchell (rugby union) =

New Zealand rugby union player

- Born: 10 October 1995 (age 31) Palmerston North, New Zealand
- Height: 198 cm (6 ft 6 in)
- Weight: 110 kg (240 lb; 17 st 5 lb)
- School: Palmerston North Boys High School

Rugby union career
- Position: Lock
- Current team: Panasonic Wild Knights
Senior career
Years	Team	Apps	(Points)
2016–2017	UE Santboiana	25	(30)
2017–2021	Manawatu	42	(25)
2019–2021	Hurricanes	23	(0)
2021−2022	Zebre	12	(5)
2022−	Panasonic Wild Knights	64	(35)
- Correct as of 22 Apr 2022

Liam Mitchell (born 10 October 1995) is a New Zealand rugby union player who plays for the Japan Rugby League One team Saitama Wild Knights. His playing position is lock.

He played for the Hurricanes, from 2019 to 2021, in Super Rugby and Manawatu Turbos, from 2017 season. He played for Italian United Rugby Championship team Zebre in 2021−2022 season.
