= Tumua Manu =

Samoa international rugby union player

- Born: 18 April 1993 (age 33) Apia, Samoa
- Height: 1.83 m (6 ft 0 in)
- Weight: 97 kg (214 lb; 15 st 4 lb)
- School: Sagaga College

Rugby union career
- Position(s): Centre, Wing
- Current team: Pau
Senior career
Years	Team	Apps	(Points)
2017–2020	Auckland	33	(50)
2018	Blues	4	(15)
2019–2020	Chiefs	20	(20)
2020–	Pau	82	(50)
- Correct as of 28 August 2023
International career
Years	Team	Apps	(Points)
2022–	Samoa	11	(27)
- Correct as of 28 August 2023

Tumua Manu (born 18 April 1993) is a Samoan professional rugby union player who plays as a centre for Top 14 club Pau and the Samoa national team.

== Club career ==
Manu decided to try his chances in New Zealand Rugby in 2015. He played for College Rifles that year but at the end of the season he suffered an ACL injury and spent most of 2016 on the sideline in rehabilitation. He returned to play for the club in 2017 and impressed sufficiently to get a call-up to the Auckland side in the Mitre 10 Cup. Injuries to Sonny Bill Williams and Tamati Tua gave him an opportunity to play for the Blues in Super Rugby 2018 where he scored 3 tries in 4 matches.
