= James O'Reilly (rugby union) =

NZ rugby union player

- Born: James Patrick O'Reilly; 12 November 1994 (age 32) New Zealand
- Height: 183 cm (6 ft 0 in)
- Weight: 105 kg (231 lb; 16 st 7 lb)
- School: Hutt International Boys' School

Rugby union career
- Position: Hooker
- Current team: Wellington
Senior career
Years	Team	Apps	(Points)
2013–	Wellington	51	(40)
2016–2017	Bay of Plenty	17	(5)
2017–2022	Hurricanes	16	(0)
- Correct as of 5 June 2022
International career
Years	Team	Apps	(Points)
2014	New Zealand U20	5	(0)
- Correct as of 5 June 2022

James Patrick O'Reilly (born 12 November 1994) is a New Zealand rugby union player who plays for the Hurricanes in the Super Rugby competition. His position of choice is hooker.
