= Isaiah Punivai =

- Full name: Isaiah Punivai
- Born: 1 December 2000 (age 25) Lower Hutt, New Zealand
- Height: 189 cm (6 ft 2 in)
- Weight: 99 kg (218 lb; 15 st 8 lb)
- School: Christ's College
- University: Lincoln University
- Notable relative: Ngane Punivai (brother)
- Occupation: Professional rugby union player

Rugby union career
- Position: Centre / Wing
- Current team: Suntory Sungoliath
Senior career
| Years | Team | Apps | (Points) |
| 2020–2023 | Canterbury | 5 | (10) |
| 2023- | Suntory Sungoliath | 54 | (80) |
- Correct as of 22 October 2019

Isaiah Punivai (born 1 December 2000, in New Zealand) is a New Zealand rugby union player who plays for Canterbury in the Mitre 10 Cup, and for the Crusaders in Super Rugby. His preferred playing position is centre, wing or fullback. After moving from Lower Hutt to Christchurch, Punivai attended Prebbleton Primary School and Christ's College in Christchurch, until he was bought by Saint Kentigern College's 1st XV in Auckland for his last year of schooling. He signed for the Canterbury squad in 2020, and was named in the Crusaders squad for the 2021 season the same year.
