= Ash Dixon =

New Zealand rugby union player

- Full name: Ashley Lyonal Dixon
- Born: 1 September 1988 (age 38) Christchurch, New Zealand
- Height: 182 cm (6 ft 0 in)
- Weight: 102 kg (225 lb; 16 st 1 lb)
- School: Christchurch Boys' High School

Rugby union career
- Position: Hooker
Senior career
Years	Team	Apps	(Points)
2008–2021	Hawke's Bay	111	(140)
2010–2011	Auckland	23	(0)
2013–2014	Hurricanes	15	(5)
2015–2021	Highlanders	100	(65)
2018	Panasonic Wild Knights	4	(0)
2021–2025	NEC Green Rockets	46	(80)
2025–2026	Kobelco Kobe Steelers	15	(30)
- Correct as of 16 June 2026
International career
Years	Team	Apps	(Points)
2007	New Zealand U19	5	(0)
2008	New Zealand U20	5	(0)
2013–2021	Māori All Blacks	19	(35)
2020	North Island	1	(5)
- Correct as of 3 July 2021

Ash Dixon (born 1 September 1988) is a New Zealand rugby union player, who currently plays as a hooker for Kobelco Kobe Steelers in Division 1 of the Japan Rugby League One (JRLO). He previously played for Green Rockets Tokatsu in Division 2 of the JRLO, for the Highlanders in Super Rugby and for Hawke's Bay in New Zealand's domestic National Provincial Championship competition. He has also played for the Hurricanes and Auckland.

== Early career ==
Dixon was a 2006 New Zealand Secondary Schools representative and Canterbury age-group rep through to Under-19 level. He has won the 2007 Under 19 Rugby World Championship with the New Zealand Under-19 team as well as the 2008 IRB Junior World Championship with the New Zealand Under-20s.

== Senior career ==
Dixon started his career with Hawke's Bay, playing 21 matches for the province from 2008 to 2009 before shifting north to further his career with Auckland. The move paid off after he was awarded a wider training group contract with the Blues for the 2010 Super 14 season. After being a part of the Blues Wider Training Group in 2010, Dixon was then promoted to the senior side for the 2011 Super Rugby season, but didn't play for the franchise.

In 2012, Dixon moved back to Hawke's Bay ahead of the 2012 ITM Cup season, and some solid displays for the Magpies saw him named in the Hurricanes Wider Training Group for the 2013 Super Rugby season. He made his Super Rugby debut on 15 March 2013 against the Highlanders. He ended up playing 9 games for the Hurricanes that season and in October 2013, he was named in the Hurricanes squad for the 2014 season.

After two seasons with the Hurricanes, Dixon moved to Dunedin to play for the Highlanders. He was first named in the Highlanders squad for the 2015 Super Rugby season and played 7 seasons for the southern franchise. He was part of the Highlanders squad that won the 2015 Super Rugby title, defeating the Hurricanes 21–14 in the final.

On 12 August 2021, the Highlanders announced that Dixon would be leaving the franchise, having played exactly 100 games for them, to take up a two-year contract in Japan. The same day, Japanese club Green Rockets Tokatsu, which competes in the Japan Rugby League One competition, announced that Dixon would be joining the club. He played four seasons for the Green Rockets during which he made 46 appearances and scored 16 tries. He left the club at the end of the 2024–2025 season.

On 4 August 2025, Kobelco Kobe Steelers announced that Dixon would join the club for the 2025–26 season. He made his debut for the club on 13 December 2025 in their round 1 match against Kubota Spears. He finished the season as a Japan Rugby League One champion, after Kobelco Kobe Steelers beat Kubota Spears 22–13 in the final. He played 15 games and scored six tries for the club.

== New Zealand Māori ==
On 25 October 2016, Dixon – who is of Ngāti Tahinga descent – was named Captain of the New Zealand Māori for their Northern hemisphere tour. Ahead of their game against Munster in Thomond Park in Limerick, he presented a Māori jersey with the initials of the recently deceased Anthony Foley to Foley's sons.

In 2020, Dixon was awarded the Tom French Cup for Māori rugby player of the year.

== Career honours ==
Highlanders

- Super Rugby: 2015

Kobelco Kobe Steelers

- Japan Rugby League One: 2025–2026

Hawke's Bay

- ITM Cup Championship: 2015
- Mitre 10 Cup Championship: 2020

Individual

- Tom French Memorial Māori Player of the Year: 2020

Awards
Preceded by Sarah Hirini	Tom French Memorial; Māori rugby union player of the year 2020	Succeeded by Sarah Hirini
