= Ngane Punivai =

- Full name: Ngantungane Gisborne James Punivai
- Born: 30 August 1998 (age 28) Lower Hutt, New Zealand
- Height: 191 cm (6 ft 3 in)
- Weight: 100 kg (220 lb; 15 st 10 lb)
- School: Christ's College
- University: Lincoln University
- Notable relative: Isaiah Punivai Brother

Rugby union career
- Position(s): Wing, Centre
- Current team: Canterbury, Hurricanes
Senior career
Years	Team	Apps	(Points)
2017–	Canterbury	47	(5)
2019	Crusaders	2	(0)
2020–22	Highlanders	12	(20)
2023	Chiefs	2	(0)
2024-	Hurricanes	0	(0)
- Correct as of 13 October 2019
International career
Years	Team	Apps	(Points)
2018	New Zealand U20	3	(0)
- Correct as of 13 October 2019

Ngantungane Gisborne James Punivai (born 30 August 1998, in New Zealand) is a New Zealand rugby union player who plays on the wing for the Hurricanes in Super Rugby. His playing position is . Punivai attended Christ's College in Christchurch, where he was captain of the 1st XV and the deputy head prefect. He has signed for the Crusaders squad in 2019. In 2019 it was announced he would be switching to play for the Highlanders. Punivai scored his first try for the Highlanders against his former team, the Crusaders on 4 July 2020
