= List of 2022–23 Super Rugby transfers (New Zealand) =

This is a list of player movements for Super Rugby teams prior to the end of the 2023 Super Rugby Pacific season. Departure and arrivals of all players that were included in a Super Rugby squad for 2022 or 2023 are listed here, regardless of when it occurred. Future-dated transfers are only included if confirmed by the player or his agent, his former team or his new team.

Notes

- 2022 players listed are all players that were named in the initial senior squad, or subsequently included in a 23-man match day squad at any game during the season.
- (did not play) denotes that a player did not play at all during the season due to injury or non-selection. These players are included to indicate they were contracted to the team.
- (short-term) denotes that a player wasn't initially contracted, but came in during the season. This could either be a club rugby player coming in as injury cover, or a player whose contract had expired at another team (typically in the Northern Hemisphere).
- (development squad) denotes a player that wasn't named in the original squad, but was announced as signing as a development player. These are often younger players or club players. Different teams use different names for development players. Other names used include (wider training group) or (wider training squad).
- Flags are only shown for players moving to or from another country.
- Players may play in several positions, but are listed in only one.

== Blues ==
Blues transfers 2022–2023
Pos	2022 squad	Out	In	2023 players
PR	Josh Fusitua (short-term); Alex Hodgman; Nepo Laulala; James Lay (did not play); Jordan Lay; Marcel Renata; Karl Tu'inukuafe; Ofa Tuʻungafasi	(substituted off) Karl Tu'inukuafe (to (France) Montpellier)		Josh Fusitua; Alex Hodgman; Nepo Laulala; James Lay; Jordan Lay (short-term); Marcel Renata; Ofa Tuʻungafasi
HK	Kurt Eklund; Ricky Riccitelli; Soane Vikena			Kurt Eklund; Ricky Riccitelli; Soane Vikena
LK	Sam Darry; Josh Goodhue; Taine Plumtree; Luke Romano; James Tucker	(substituted off) Josh Goodhue (to (Japan) Black Rams Tokyo); (substituted off) Luke Romano (retired)	(substituted in) Patrick Tuipulotu (returned from (Japan) Toyota Verblitz)	Sam Darry; Taine Plumtree; James Tucker; Patrick Tuipulotu
BR	Adrian Choat; Vaiolini Ekuasi (short-term); Akira Ioane; Dalton Papalii; Tom Robinson; Anton Segner; Hoskins Sotutu; Cameron Suafoa	(substituted off) Vaiolini Ekuasi (to (Australia) Rebels)	(substituted in) Rob Rush (from Northland)	Adrian Choat; Akira Ioane; Dalton Papalii; Tom Robinson; Rob Rush; Anton Segner; Hoskins Sotutu; Cameron Suafoa
SH	Finlay Christie; Taufa Funaki; Lisati Milo-Harris (short-term); Sam Nock	(substituted off) Lisati Milo-Harris (to Northland)		Finlay Christie; Taufa Funaki; Sam Nock
FH	Beauden Barrett; Stephen Perofeta; Harry Plummer			Beauden Barrett; Stephen Perofeta; Harry Plummer
CE	Corey Evans; Rieko Ioane; Tanielu Teleʻa; Tamati Tua; Roger Tuivasa-Sheck	(substituted off) Tamati Tua (to (Australia) Brumbies)		Corey Evans; Rieko Ioane; Tanielu Teleʻa; Roger Tuivasa-Sheck
WG	Nigel Ah Wong (short-term); Caleb Clarke; Bryce Heem; AJ Lam; Jacob Ratumaitavuki-Kneepkens; Mark Tele'a	(substituted off) Nigel Ah Wong (to Bay of Plenty)	(substituted in) Caleb Tangitau (from New Zealand Sevens)	Caleb Clarke; Bryce Heem; AJ Lam; Jacob Ratumaitavuki-Kneepkens; Caleb Tangitau; Mark Tele'a
FB	Jock McKenzie (short-term); Zarn Sullivan	(substituted off) Jock McKenzie (returned to Auckland)		Zarn Sullivan
Coach	Leon MacDonald			Leon MacDonald

== Chiefs ==
Chiefs transfers 2022–2023
Pos	2022 squad	Out	In	2023 players
PR	Josh Bartlett (short-term); George Dyer (short-term); Sione Mafileo; Atu Moli; Ollie Norris; Reuben O'Neill; Aidan Ross; Angus Taʻavao; Solomone Tukuafu (short-term)	(substituted off) Josh Bartlett (returned to Bay of Plenty); (substituted off) Sione Mafileo (to North Harbour); (substituted off) Reuben O'Neill (to Crusaders)	(substituted in) Jared Proffit (from Hurricanes); (substituted in) John Ryan (from (Ireland) Munster)	George Dyer; Atu Moli; Ollie Norris; Jared Proffit; Aidan Ross; John Ryan; Angus Taʻavao; Solomone Tukuafu (short-term)
HK	Bradley Slater; Samisoni Taukei'aho; Tyrone Thompson			Bradley Slater; Samisoni Taukei'aho; Tyrone Thompson
LK	Naitoa Ah Kuoi; Hamilton Burr (short-term); Josh Lord; Laghlan McWhannell; Brodie Retallick; Tupou Vaa'i	(substituted off) Hamilton Burr (returned to Waikato)	(substituted in) Manaaki Selby-Rickit (from Highlanders)	Naitoa Ah Kuoi; Josh Lord; Laghlan McWhannell; Brodie Retallick; Manaaki Selby-Rickit; Tupou Vaa'i
BR	Kaylum Boshier; Mitchell Brown; Sam Cane; Samipeni Finau; Tom Florence (short-term); Luke Jacobson; Mitch Jacobson (short-term); Simon Parker; Pita Gus Sowakula	(substituted off) Mitchell Brown (to (Japan) Yokohama Canon Eagles); (substituted off) Tom Florence (to (United States) New Orleans Gold); (substituted off) Mitch Jacobson (to (United States) New England Free Jacks)		Kaylum Boshier; Sam Cane; Samipeni Finau; Luke Jacobson; Simon Parker; Pita Gus Sowakula
SH	Cortez Ratima; Xavier Roe; Brad Weber		(substituted in) Te Toiroa Tahuriorangi (from Crusaders)	Cortez Ratima; Xavier Roe; Te Toiroa Tahuriorangi; Brad Weber
FH	Bryn Gatland; Rivez Reihana; Kaleb Trask	(substituted off) Kaleb Trask (to (Japan) Mie Honda Heat)	(substituted in) Damian McKenzie (returned from (Japan) Tokyo Sungoliath)	Bryn Gatland; Damian McKenzie; Rivez Reihana
CE	Inga Finau (short-term); Anton Lienert-Brown; Alex Nankivell; Rameka Poihipi; Quinn Tupaea; Gideon Wrampling	(substituted off) Inga Finau (to (France) Provence)	(substituted in) Lalomilo Lalomilo (from Bay of Plenty); (substituted in) Daniel Rona (from Taranaki)	Lalomilo Lalomilo (short-term); Anton Lienert-Brown; Alex Nankivell; Rameka Poihipi; Daniel Rona (short-term); Quinn Tupaea; Gideon Wrampling
WG	Jonah Lowe; Etene Nanai-Seturo; Emoni Narawa; Shaun Stevenson	(substituted off) Jonah Lowe (to Highlanders)	(substituted in) Solomon Alaimalo (from Highlanders); (substituted in) Liam Coombes-Fabling (from Highlanders); (substituted in) Peniasi Malimali (from Counties Manukau); (substituted in) Ngane Punivai (from Highlanders)	Solomon Alaimalo (short-term); Liam Coombes-Fabling (short-term); Peniasi Malimali; Etene Nanai-Seturo; Emoni Narawa; Ngane Punivai; Shaun Stevenson
FB	Josh Ioane; Chase Tiatia	(substituted off) Chase Tiatia (to (Australia) Western Force)		Josh Ioane
Coach	Clayton McMillan			Clayton McMillan

== Crusaders ==
Crusaders transfers 2022–2023
Pos	2022 squad	Out	In	2023 players
PR	George Bower; Finlay Brewis; Seb Calder (short-term); Oli Jager; Joe Moody; Fletcher Newell; Abraham Pole (short-term); Tamaiti Williams	(substituted off) Abraham Pole (to Moana Pasifika)	(substituted in) John Afoa (from (France) Vannes); (substituted in) Reuben O'Neill (from Chiefs); (substituted in) Kershawl Sykes-Martin (from Tasman); (substituted in) Andrew Turner (from (England) Bristol Bears)	John Afoa (short-term); George Bower; Finlay Brewis; Seb Calder (short-term); Oli Jager; Joe Moody; Fletcher Newell; Reuben O'Neill (short-term); Kershawl Sykes-Martin (short-term); Andrew Turner (short-term); Tamaiti Williams
HK	George Bell (short-term); Ricky Jackson (short-term); Shilo Klein; Brodie McAlister; Codie Taylor	(substituted off) Ricky Jackson (returned to Otago); (substituted off) Shilo Klein (to (United States) San Diego Legion)	(substituted in) Quentin MacDonald (from Tasman); (substituted in) Ioane Moananu (from Counties Manukau)	George Bell; Quentin MacDonald (short-term); Brodie McAlister; Ioane Moananu (short-term); Codie Taylor
LK	Scott Barrett; Hamish Dalzell (short-term); Mitchell Dunshea; Zach Gallagher; Liam Hallam-Eames (short-term); Quinten Strange; Sam Whitelock	(substituted off) Hamish Dalzell (to (United States) Rugby New York); (substituted off) Liam Hallam-Eames (to (United States) New Orleans Gold)	(substituted in) Jamie Hannah (from Canterbury)	Scott Barrett; Mitchell Dunshea; Zach Gallagher; Jamie Hannah (short-term); Quinten Strange; Sam Whitelock
BR	Ethan Blackadder; Tom Christie; Dominic Gardiner; Cullen Grace; Sione Havili Talitui; Corey Kellow; Pablo Matera	(substituted off) Pablo Matera (to (Japan) Mie Honda Heat)	(substituted in) Christian Lio-Willie (from Highlanders)	Ethan Blackadder; Tom Christie; Dominic Gardiner; Cullen Grace; Sione Havili Talitui; Corey Kellow; Christian Lio-Willie
SH	Mitchell Drummond; Bryn Hall; Te Toiroa Tahuriorangi	(substituted off) Bryn Hall (to (Japan) Shizuoka Blue Revs); (substituted off) Te Toiroa Tahuriorangi (to Highlanders)	(substituted in) Louie Chapman (from Tasman); (substituted in) Willi Heinz (from Canterbury); (substituted in) Noah Hotham (from Tasman); (substituted in) Joel Lam (from Canterbury)	Louie Chapman (short-term); Mitchell Drummond; Willi Heinz; Noah Hotham; Joel Lam (short-term)
FH	Fergus Burke; Simon Hickey; Richie Mo'unga	(substituted off) Simon Hickey (to (Japan) Hino Red Dolphins)	(substituted in) Taha Kemara (from Waikato)	Fergus Burke; Taha Kemara; Richie Mo'unga
CE	Braydon Ennor; Inga Finau (short-term); Jack Goodhue; David Havili; Dallas McLeod; Isaiah Punivai	(substituted off) Inga Finau (to (France) Provence); (substituted off) Isaiah Punivai (to (Japan) Tokyo Sungoliath)		Braydon Ennor; Jack Goodhue; David Havili; Dallas McLeod
WG	George Bridge; Leicester Fainga'anuku; Kini Naholo; Sevu Reece	(substituted off) George Bridge (to (France) Montpellier); (substituted off) Kini Naholo (to Hurricanes)	(substituted in) Melani Nanai (from Bay of Plenty); (substituted in) Pepesana Patafilo (from Hurricanes); (substituted in) Macca Springer (from Tasman)	Leicester Fainga'anuku; Melani Nanai; Pepesana Patafilo; Sevu Reece; Macca Springer
FB	Chay Fihaki; Will Jordan		(substituted in) Will Gualter (from Canterbury)	Chay Fihaki; Will Gualter (short-term); Will Jordan
Coach	Scott Robertson			Scott Robertson

== Highlanders ==
Highlanders transfers 2022–2023
Pos	2022 squad	Out	In	2023 players
PR	Jermaine Ainsley; Ethan de Groot; Josh Hohneck; Luca Inch (short-term); Ayden Johnstone; Daniel Lienert-Brown; Saula Ma'u; Jeff Thwaites	(substituted off) Josh Hohneck (to Otago)	(substituted in) PJ Sheck (from Wellington)	Jermaine Ainsley; Ethan de Groot; Luca Inch; Ayden Johnstone; Daniel Lienert-Brown; Saula Ma'u; PJ Sheck (short-term); Jeff Thwaites
HK	Leni Apisai (short-term); Liam Coltman; Andrew Makalio; Rhys Marshall	(substituted off) Liam Coltman (to (France) Lyon)	(substituted in) Jack Taylor (from Southland)	Leni Apisai; Andrew Makalio; Rhys Marshall; Jack Taylor (short-term)
LK	Sam Caird; Josh Dickson; Bryn Evans; Fabian Holland (short-term); Pari Pari Parkinson; Manaaki Selby-Rickit	(substituted off) Sam Caird (to (Japan) Hanazono Kintetsu Liners); (substituted off) Bryn Evans (to Hawke's Bay); (substituted off) Manaaki Selby-Rickit (to Chiefs)	(substituted in) Josh Bekhuis (from Southland); (substituted in) Will Tucker (from Otago)	Josh Bekhuis (short-term); Josh Dickson; Fabian Holland; Pari Pari Parkinson; Will Tucker
BR	Gareth Evans; Sam Fischli (short-term); Shannon Frizell; Billy Harmon; Max Hicks; James Lentjes; Christian Lio-Willie (short-term); Marino Mikaele-Tu'u; Hugh Renton; Sean Withy	(substituted off) Gareth Evans (to Hawke's Bay); (substituted off) Sam Fischli (returned to Otago); (substituted off) Christian Lio-Willie (to Crusaders)	(substituted in) Nikora Broughton (from Bay of Plenty); (substituted in) Oliver Haig (from Otago)	Nikora Broughton; Shannon Frizell; Oliver Haig (short-term); Billy Harmon; Max Hicks; James Lentjes; Marino Mikaele-Tu'u; Hugh Renton; Sean Withy
SH	James Arscott (short-term); Folau Fakatava; Kayne Hammington; Nathan Hastie (short-term); Aaron Smith	(substituted off) Kayne Hammington (to (Japan) Shimizu Koto Blue Sharks)	(substituted in) Kemara Hauiti-Parapara (from Otago); (substituted in) Te Toiroa Tahuriorangi (from Crusaders)	James Arscott; Folau Fakatava; Nathan Hastie (short-term); Kemara Hauiti-Parapara (short-term); Aaron Smith; Te Toiroa Tahuriorangi
FH	Marty Banks; Mitch Hunt		(substituted in) Freddie Burns (from (England) Leicester Tigers); (substituted in) Cam Millar (from Otago)	Marty Banks; Freddie Burns; Mitch Hunt; Cam Millar
CE	Scott Gregory; Fetuli Paea; Ngane Punivai; Josh Timu; Sio Tomkinson (did not play); Thomas Umaga-Jensen	(substituted off) Ngane Punivai (to Chiefs); (substituted off) Sio Tomkinson (to (Wales) Dragons)	(substituted in) Jake Te Hiwi (from Otago); (substituted in) Matt Whaanga (from Southland)	Scott Gregory; Fetuli Paea; Jake Te Hiwi (short-term); Josh Timu; Thomas Umaga-Jensen; Matt Whaanga (short-term)
WG	Solomon Alaimalo (did not play); Liam Coombes-Fabling (short-term); Mosese Dawai; Connor Garden-Bachop; Sam Gilbert; Jona Nareki; Denny Solomona (short-term); Vereniki Tikoisolomone (did not play); Freedom Vahaakolo (short-term); Rory van Vugt (short-term)	(substituted off) Solomon Alaimalo (to Chiefs); (substituted off) Liam Coombes-Fabling (returned to Waikato); (substituted off) Denny Solomona (to North Harbour); (substituted off) Vereniki Tikoisolomone (to (United States) Houston SaberCats); (substituted off) Freedom Vahaakolo (returned to Otago); (substituted off) Rory van Vugt (returned to Southland)	(substituted in) Martín Bogado (from (France) Bayonne); (substituted in) Jonah Lowe (from Chiefs)	Martín Bogado; Mosese Dawai; Connor Garden-Bachop; Sam Gilbert; Jonah Lowe; Jona Nareki
FB	Vilimoni Koroi		(substituted in) Finn Hurley (from Otago)	Finn Hurley (short-term); Vilimoni Koroi
Coach	Tony Brown	(substituted off) Tony Brown (returned to Japan (assistant))	(substituted in) Clarke Dermody (from assistant coach)	Clarke Dermody

== Hurricanes ==
Hurricanes transfers 2022–2023
Pos	2022 squad	Out	In	2023 players
PR	Alex Fidow; Owen Franks; Tyrel Lomax; Tevita Mafileo; Ben May (short-term); Xavier Numia; Jared Proffit (short-term); Pouri Rakete-Stones; Pasilio Tosi	(substituted off) Alex Fidow (to (Australia) Souths Logan Magpies); (substituted off) Ben May (retired); (substituted off) Jared Proffit (to Chiefs)		Owen Franks; Tyrel Lomax; Tevita Mafileo; Xavier Numia; Pouri Rakete-Stones; Pasilio Tosi
HK	Leni Apisai (short-term); Asafo Aumua; Dane Coles; Jacob Devery (short-term); Bruce Kauika-Petersen (short-term); Kianu Kereru-Symes (short-term); Siua Maile (short-term); James O'Reilly; Raymond Tuputupu (short-term)	(substituted off) Leni Apisai (to Highlanders); (substituted off) Bruce Kauika-Petersen (to Northland); (substituted off) Kianu Kereru-Symes (to (United States) New England Free Jacks); (substituted off) Siua Maile (to (Italy) Benetton); (substituted off) James O'Reilly (to Wellington); (substituted off) Raymond Tuputupu (released)	(substituted in) Hame Faiva (from (England) Worcester Warriors)	Asafo Aumua; Dane Coles; Jacob Devery; Hame Faiva (short-term)
LK	Dominic Bird; James Blackwell; Caleb Delany; Tom Parsons (short-term); Justin Sangster; Scott Scrafton; Isaia Walker-Leawere	(substituted off) Tom Parsons (returned to Hawke's Bay); (substituted off) Scott Scrafton (to (Italy) Benetton)	(substituted in) Hugo Plummer (from Wellington)	Dominic Bird; James Blackwell; Caleb Delany; Hugo Plummer (short-term); Justin Sangster; Isaia Walker-Leawere
BR	Devan Flanders; Blake Gibson; TK Howden; Brayden Iose; Du'Plessis Kirifi; Tyler Laubscher; Reed Prinsep; Ardie Savea	(substituted off) Blake Gibson (to (Japan) Tokyo Sungoliath)	(substituted in) Peter Lakai (from Wellington)	Devan Flanders; TK Howden; Brayden Iose; Du'Plessis Kirifi; Peter Lakai; Tyler Laubscher; Reed Prinsep; Ardie Savea
SH	Jamie Booth; Logan Henry (short-term); Richard Judd (short-term); TJ Perenara; Cam Roigard	(substituted off) Richard Judd (to (United States) San Diego Legion)		Jamie Booth; Logan Henry (short-term); TJ Perenara; Cam Roigard
FH	Jackson Garden-Bachop; Aidan Morgan	(substituted off) Jackson Garden-Bachop (to (Japan) Hanazono Kintetsu Liners)	(substituted in) Brett Cameron (from (Japan) Kamaishi Seawaves); (substituted in) Harry Godfrey (from Hawke's Bay); (substituted in) Riley Hohepa (from Counties Manukau)	Brett Cameron; Harry Godfrey (short-term); Riley Hohepa (short-term); Aidan Morgan
CE	Riley Higgins (short-term); Billy Proctor; Bailyn Sullivan; Peter Umaga-Jensen; Teihorangi Walden	(substituted off) Teihorangi Walden (to (United States) Rugby New York)		Riley Higgins; Billy Proctor; Bailyn Sullivan; Peter Umaga-Jensen
WG	Wes Goosen; Josh Moorby; Pepesana Patafilo; Salesi Rayasi; Julian Savea	(substituted off) Wes Goosen (to (Scotland) Edinburgh); (substituted off) Pepesana Patafilo (to Crusaders)	(substituted in) Kini Naholo (from Crusaders); (substituted in) Daniel Sinkinson (from Waikato)	Josh Moorby; Kini Naholo; Salesi Rayasi; Julian Savea; Daniel Sinkinson
FB	Jordie Barrett; Ruben Love			Jordie Barrett; Ruben Love
Coach	Jason Holland			Jason Holland

== See also ==
- List of 2022–23 Premiership Rugby transfers
- List of 2022–23 United Rugby Championship transfers
- List of 2022–23 Top 14 transfers
- List of 2022–23 RFU Championship transfers
- List of 2022–23 Rugby Pro D2 transfers
- List of 2022–23 Major League Rugby transfers
- SANZAAR
- Super Rugby franchise areas
