= List of 2021–22 Super Rugby transfers (New Zealand) =

This is a list of player movements for Super Rugby teams prior to the end of the 2022 Super Rugby Pacific season. Departure and arrivals of all players that were included in a Super Rugby squad for 2021 or 2022 are listed here, regardless of when it occurred. Future-dated transfers are only included if confirmed by the player or his agent, his former team or his new team.

Notes

- 2021 players listed are all players that were named in the initial senior squad, or subsequently included in a 23-man match day squad at any game during the season.
- (did not play) denotes that a player did not play at all during one of the two seasons due to injury or non-selection. These players are included to indicate they were contracted to the team. For the 2021 season, players listed as 'did not play' did not feature in any matches in Super Rugby Aotearoa or Super Rugby Trans-Tasman.
- (short-term) denotes that a player wasn't initially contracted, but came in during the season. This could either be a club rugby player coming in as injury cover, or a player whose contract had expired at another team (typically in the Northern Hemisphere).
- (development squad) denotes a player that wasn't named in the original squad, but was announced as signing as a development player. These are often younger players or club players. Different teams use different names for development players. Other names used include (wider training group) or (wider training squad).
- Flags are only shown for players moving to or from another country.
- Players may play in several positions, but are listed in only one.

== Blues ==
Blues transfers 2021–2022
Pos	2021 squad	Out	In	2022 players
PR	Alex Hodgman; Nepo Laulala; James Lay; Marcel Renata; Karl Tu'inukuafe; Ofa Tu'ungafasi		(substituted in) Josh Fusitua (from Auckland); (substituted in) Jordan Lay (from Auckland)	Josh Fusitua (short-term); Alex Hodgman; Nepo Laulala; James Lay; Jordan Lay; Marcel Renata; Karl Tu'inukuafe; Ofa Tu'ungafasi
HK	Leni Apisai (short-term); Kurt Eklund; Ray Niuia; Luteru Tolai (short-term); Soane Vikena	(substituted off) Leni Apisai (to Hurricanes); (substituted off) Ray Niuia (to Moana Pasifika); (substituted off) Luteru Tolai (to Moana Pasifika)	(substituted in) Ricky Riccitelli (from Hurricanes)	Kurt Eklund; Ricky Riccitelli; Soane Vikena
LK	Gerard Cowley-Tuioti; Sam Darry; Josh Goodhue; Jacob Pierce; Taine Plumtree; Patrick Tuipulotu	(substituted off) Gerard Cowley-Tuioti (to (Japan) Kobelco Kobe Steelers); (substituted off) Jacob Pierce (to (Japan) Toshiba Brave Lupus Tokyo); (substituted off) Patrick Tuipulotu (to (Japan) Toyota Verblitz)	(substituted in) Luke Romano (from Crusaders); (substituted in) Cameron Suafoa (from North Harbour); (substituted in) James Tucker (from (Australia) Brumbies)	Sam Darry; Josh Goodhue; Taine Plumtree; Luke Romano; Cameron Suafoa; James Tucker
BR	Adrian Choat (short-term); Blake Gibson; Dillon Hunt (did not play); Akira Ioane; Dalton Papalii; Tom Robinson; Hoskins Sotutu	(substituted off) Blake Gibson (to Hurricanes); (substituted off) Dillon Hunt (retired)	(substituted in) Vaiolini Ekuasi (from Auckland); (substituted in) Anton Segner (from Tasman)	Adrian Choat; Vaiolini Ekuasi (short-term); Akira Ioane; Dalton Papalii; Tom Robinson; Anton Segner; Hoskins Sotutu
SH	Finlay Christie; Sam Nock; Jonathan Ruru	(substituted off) Jonathan Ruru (to (France) Provence)	(substituted in) Taufa Funaki (from Auckland); (substituted in) Lisati Milo-Harris (from Southland)	Finlay Christie; Taufa Funaki; Lisati Milo-Harris (short-term); Sam Nock
FH	Otere Black; Stephen Perofeta; Harry Plummer	(substituted off) Otere Black (to (Japan) Shining Arcs)	(substituted in) Beauden Barrett (returned from (Japan) Tokyo Sungoliath)	Beauden Barrett; Stephen Perofeta; Harry Plummer
CE	TJ Faiane; Rieko Ioane; Tanielu Teleʻa	(substituted off) TJ Faiane (to (Japan) Hino Red Dolphins)	(substituted in) Corey Evans (from Auckland); (substituted in) Tamati Tua (from Northland); (substituted in) Roger Tuivasa-Sheck (from New Zealand Warriors)	Corey Evans; Rieko Ioane; Tanielu Teleʻa; Tamati Tua; Roger Tuivasa-Sheck
WG	Caleb Clarke; Bryce Heem; AJ Lam; Jone Macilai-Tori (did not play); Emoni Narawa; Jacob Ratumaitavuki-Kneepkens; Mark Tele'a	(substituted off) Jone Macilai-Tori (to Northland); (substituted off) Emoni Narawa (to Chiefs)	(substituted in) Nigel Ah Wong (from Old Boys Marist)	Nigel Ah Wong (short-term); Caleb Clarke; Bryce Heem; AJ Lam; Jacob Ratumaitavuki-Kneepkens; Mark Tele'a
FB	Zarn Sullivan		(substituted in) Jock McKenzie (from Auckland)	Jock McKenzie (short-term); Zarn Sullivan
Coach	Leon MacDonald			Leon MacDonald

== Chiefs ==
Chiefs transfers 2021–2022
Pos	2021 squad	Out	In	2022 players
PR	Joe Apikotoa (short-term); Ezekiel Lindenmuth (short-term); Sione Mafileo; Atu Moli; Ollie Norris; Reuben O'Neill; Aidan Ross; Angus Ta'avao	(substituted off) Joe Apikotoa (to Moana Pasifika); (substituted off) Ezekiel Lindenmuth (to Moana Pasifika)	(substituted in) Josh Bartlett (from Bay of Plenty); (substituted in) George Dyer (from Waikato); (substituted in) Solomone Tukuafu (from Waikato)	Josh Bartlett (short-term); George Dyer (short-term); Sione Mafileo; Atu Moli; Ollie Norris; Reuben O'Neill; Aidan Ross; Angus Ta'avao; Solomone Tukuafu (short-term)
HK	Nathan Harris; Bradley Slater; Samisoni Taukei'aho	(substituted off) Nathan Harris (retired)	(substituted in) Tyrone Thompson (from Wellington)	Bradley Slater; Samisoni Taukei'aho; Tyrone Thompson
LK	Naitoa Ah Kuoi; Josh Lord; Laghlan McWhannell (did not play); Tupou Vaa'i		(substituted in) Hamilton Burr (from Waikato); (substituted in) Brodie Retallick (returned from (Japan) Kobelco Kobe Steelers)	Naitoa Ah Kuoi; Hamilton Burr (short-term); Josh Lord; Laghlan McWhannell; Brodie Retallick; Tupou Vaa'i
BR	Kaylum Boshier; Lachlan Boshier; Mitchell Brown; Sam Cane; Samipeni Finau (short-term); Tom Florence (short-term); Luke Jacobson; Zane Kapeli (short-term); Mitchell Karpik; Liam Messam (short-term); Simon Parker; Pita Gus Sowakula; Viliami Taulani (short-term)	(substituted off) Lachlan Boshier (to (Japan) Saitama Wild Knights); (substituted off) Zane Kapeli (injured); (substituted off) Mitchell Karpik (to Bay of Plenty); (substituted off) Liam Messam (returned to Waikato); (substituted off) Viliami Taulani (to (England) Harlequins)	(substituted in) Mitch Jacobson (from Waikato)	Kaylum Boshier; Mitchell Brown; Sam Cane; Samipeni Finau; Tom Florence (short-term); Luke Jacobson; Mitch Jacobson (short-term); Simon Parker; Pita Gus Sowakula
SH	Xavier Roe; Te Toiroa Tahuriorangi; Brad Weber	(substituted off) Te Toiroa Tahuriorangi (to Crusaders)	(substituted in) Cortez Ratima (from Waikato)	Cortez Ratima; Xavier Roe; Brad Weber
FH	Bryn Gatland; Rivez Reihana; Kaleb Trask		(substituted in) Josh Ioane (from Highlanders)	Bryn Gatland; Josh Ioane; Rivez Reihana; Kaleb Trask
CE	Anton Lienert-Brown; Alex Nankivell; Rameka Poihipi; Bailyn Sullivan; Quinn Tupaea; Gideon Wrampling (short-term)	(substituted off) Bailyn Sullivan (to Hurricanes)	(substituted in) Inga Finau (from Bay of Plenty)	Inga Finau (short-term); Anton Lienert-Brown; Alex Nankivell; Rameka Poihipi; Quinn Tupaea; Gideon Wrampling
WG	Jonah Lowe; Etene Nanai-Seturo; Shaun Stevenson; Sean Wainui	(substituted off) Sean Wainui	(substituted in) Emoni Narawa (from Blues)	Jonah Lowe; Etene Nanai-Seturo; Emoni Narawa; Shaun Stevenson
FB	Damian McKenzie; Chase Tiatia	(substituted off) Damian McKenzie (to (Japan) Tokyo Sungoliath)		Chase Tiatia
Coach	Clayton McMillan			Clayton McMillan

== Crusaders ==
Crusaders transfers 2021–2022
Pos	2021 squad	Out	In	2022 players
PR	Michael Alaalatoa; George Bower; Oli Jager; Joe Moody; Fletcher Newell; Isi Tu'ungafasi; Tamaiti Williams	(substituted off) Michael Alaalatoa (to (Ireland) Leinster); (substituted off) Isi Tu'ungafasi (to Moana Pasifika)	(substituted in) Finlay Brewis (from Canterbury); (substituted in) Seb Calder (from Canterbury); (substituted in) Abraham Pole (from Otago)	George Bower; Finlay Brewis; Seb Calder (short-term); Oli Jager; Joe Moody; Fletcher Newell; Abraham Pole (short-term); Tamaiti Williams
HK	Quentin MacDonald (short-term, did not play); Andrew Makalio (did not play); Brodie McAlister; Codie Taylor; Nathan Vella	(substituted off) Quentin MacDonald (returned to Tasman); (substituted off) Andrew Makalio (to Highlanders); (substituted off) Nathan Vella (to Bay of Plenty)	(substituted in) George Bell (from Canterbury); (substituted in) Ricky Jackson (from Highlanders); (substituted in) Shilo Klein (from Canterbury)	George Bell (short-term); Ricky Jackson (short-term); Shilo Klein; Brodie McAlister; Codie Taylor
LK	Scott Barrett; Mitchell Dunshea; Luke Romano; Quinten Strange; Sam Whitelock	(substituted off) Luke Romano (to Blues)	(substituted in) Hamish Dalzell (from Canterbury); (substituted in) Zach Gallagher (from Canterbury); (substituted in) Liam Hallam-Eames (from Northland)	Scott Barrett; Hamish Dalzell (short-term); Mitchell Dunshea; Zach Gallagher; Liam Hallam-Eames (short-term); Quinten Strange; Sam Whitelock
BR	Liam Allen (short-term); Ethan Blackadder; Tom Christie; Whetu Douglas; Cullen Grace; Sione Havili Talitui; Brendon O'Connor (short-term); Tom Sanders	(substituted off) Liam Allen (returned to Canterbury); (substituted off) Whetu Douglas (to (Japan) Green Rockets Tokatsu); (substituted off) Brendon O'Connor (returned to Hawke's Bay); (substituted off) Tom Sanders (to (Japan) Tokyo Sungoliath)	(substituted in) Dominic Gardiner (from Canterbury); (substituted in) Corey Kellow (from Canterbury); (substituted in) Pablo Matera (from (France) Stade Français)	Ethan Blackadder; Tom Christie; Dominic Gardiner; Cullen Grace; Sione Havili Talitui; Corey Kellow; Pablo Matera
SH	Mitchell Drummond; Ere Enari; Bryn Hall	(substituted off) Ere Enari (to Moana Pasifika)	(substituted in) Te Toiroa Tahuriorangi (from Chiefs)	Mitchell Drummond; Bryn Hall; Te Toiroa Tahuriorangi
FH	Fergus Burke; Brett Cameron (did not play); Richie Mo'unga	(substituted off) Brett Cameron (to (Japan) Kamaishi Seawaves)	(substituted in) Simon Hickey (from Hurricanes)	Fergus Burke; Simon Hickey; Richie Mo'unga
CE	Braydon Ennor; Jack Goodhue; David Havili; Dallas McLeod; Isaiah Punivai (did not play); Rene Ranger (did not play)	(substituted off) Rene Ranger (to Northland)	(substituted in) Inga Finau (from Bay of Plenty)	Braydon Ennor; Inga Finau (short-term); Jack Goodhue; David Havili; Dallas McLeod; Isaiah Punivai
WG	George Bridge; Leicester Fainga'anuku; Chay Fihaki; Manasa Mataele; Josh McKay; Sevu Reece	(substituted off) Manasa Mataele (to (Australia) Force); (substituted off) Josh McKay (to (Scotland) Glasgow Warriors)	(substituted in) Kini Naholo (from Taranaki)	George Bridge; Leicester Fainga'anuku; Chay Fihaki; Kini Naholo; Sevu Reece
FB	Will Jordan			Will Jordan
Coach	Scott Robertson			Scott Robertson

== Highlanders ==
Highlanders transfers 2021–2022
Pos	2021 squad	Out	In	2022 players
PR	Jermaine Ainsley (did not play); Ethan de Groot; Josh Hohneck; Ayden Johnstone; Daniel Lienert-Brown; Jeff Thwaites; Siate Tokolahi	(substituted off) Siate Tokolahi (to (France) Pau)	(substituted in) Luca Inch (from Tasman); (substituted in) Saula Ma'u (from Otago)	Jermaine Ainsley; Ethan de Groot; Josh Hohneck; Luca Inch (short-term); Ayden Johnstone; Daniel Lienert-Brown; Saula Ma'u; Jeff Thwaites
HK	Liam Coltman; Ash Dixon; Ricky Jackson (did not play)	(substituted off) Ash Dixon (to (Japan) Green Rockets Tokatsu); (substituted off) Ricky Jackson (to Crusaders)	(substituted in) Leni Apisai (from Auckland); (substituted in) Andrew Makalio (from Crusaders); (substituted in) Rhys Marshall (from Waikato)	Leni Apisai (short-term); Liam Coltman; Andrew Makalio; Rhys Marshall
LK	Josh Dickson; Bryn Evans; Pari Pari Parkinson; Jack Regan (short-term); Manaaki Selby-Rickit	(substituted off) Jack Regan (to (Wales) Ospreys)	(substituted in) Sam Caird (from (Australia) Waratahs); (substituted in) Fabian Holland (from Otago)	Sam Caird; Josh Dickson; Bryn Evans; Fabian Holland (short-term); Pari Pari Parkinson; Manaaki Selby-Rickit
BR	Teariki Ben-Nicholas; Shannon Frizell; Billy Harmon; Kazuki Himeno; James Lentjes; Marino Mikaele-Tu'u; Sione Misiloi (did not play); Hugh Renton (short-term); Liam Squire (did not play)	(substituted off) Teariki Ben-Nicholas (to (France) Castres); (substituted off) Kazuki Himeno (returned to (Japan) Toyota Verblitz); (substituted off) Sione Misiloi (to Southland); (substituted off) Liam Squire (retired)	(substituted in) Gareth Evans (from Hurricanes); (substituted in) Sam Fischli (from Otago); (substituted in) Max Hicks (from Tasman); (substituted in) Christian Lio-Willie (from Otago); (substituted in) Sean Withy (from Otago)	Gareth Evans; Sam Fischli (short-term); Shannon Frizell; Billy Harmon; Max Hicks; James Lentjes; Christian Lio-Willie (short-term); Marino Mikaele-Tu'u; Hugh Renton; Sean Withy
SH	James Arscott (short-term); Folau Fakatava; Kayne Hammington; Aaron Smith		(substituted in) Nathan Hastie (from Otago)	James Arscott (short-term); Folau Fakatava; Kayne Hammington; Nathan Hastie (short-term); Aaron Smith
FH	Mitch Hunt; Josh Ioane; Caleb Makene (short-term); Tim O'Malley (short-term)	(substituted off) Josh Ioane (to Chiefs); (substituted off) Caleb Makene (to (United States) Utah Warriors); (substituted off) Tim O'Malley (to (Italy) Zebre Parma)	(substituted in) Marty Banks (from (Japan) NTT Red Hurricanes)	Marty Banks; Mitch Hunt
CE	Michael Collins; Scott Gregory; Fetuli Paea (did not play); Ngane Punivai; Sio Tomkinson; Thomas Umaga-Jensen	(substituted off) Michael Collins (to (Wales) Ospreys)		Scott Gregory; Fetuli Paea; Ngane Punivai; Sio Tomkinson; Thomas Umaga-Jensen
WG	Solomon Alaimalo; Connor Garden-Bachop; Sam Gilbert; Josh Moorby (short-term, did not play); Jona Nareki; Freedom Vahaakolo (short-term)	(substituted off) Josh Moorby (to Hurricanes)	(substituted in) Liam Coombes-Fabling (from Waikato); (substituted in) Mosese Dawai (from Waikato); (substituted in) Denny Solomona (from (England) Sale Sharks); (substituted in) Vereniki Tikoisolomone (from Taranaki); (substituted in) Rory van Vugt (from Southland)	Solomon Alaimalo; Liam Coombes-Fabling (short-term); Mosese Dawai; Connor Garden-Bachop; Sam Gilbert; Jona Nareki; Denny Solomona (short-term); Vereniki Tikoisolomone; Freedom Vahaakolo (short-term); Rory van Vugt (short-term)
FB	Vilimoni Koroi (did not play); Nehe Milner-Skudder; Josh Timu (short-term, did not play)	(substituted off) Nehe Milner-Skudder (to Manawatu)		Vilimoni Koroi; Josh Timu
Coach	Tony Brown; Clarke Dermody (short-term)	(substituted off) Clarke Dermody (returned to assistant coach)		Tony Brown

== Hurricanes ==
Hurricanes transfers 2021–2022
Pos	2021 squad	Out	In	2022 players
PR	Fraser Armstrong; Alex Fidow; Tyrel Lomax; Tevita Mafileo; Xavier Numia; Pouri Rakete-Stones	(substituted off) Fraser Armstrong (retired)	(substituted in) Owen Franks (from (England) Northampton Saints); (substituted in) Ben May (unattached); (substituted in) Jared Proffit (from Taranaki); (substituted in) Pasilio Tosi (from Bay of Plenty)	Alex Fidow; Owen Franks; Tyrel Lomax; Tevita Mafileo; Ben May (short-term); Xavier Numia; Jared Proffit (short-term); Pouri Rakete-Stones; Pasilio Tosi
HK	Asafo Aumua; Dane Coles; James O'Reilly (short-term); Ricky Riccitelli	(substituted off) Ricky Riccitelli (to Blues)	(substituted in) Leni Apisai (from Blues); (substituted in) Jacob Devery (from Hawke's Bay); (substituted in) Bruce Kauika-Petersen (from Wellington); (substituted in) Kianu Kereru-Symes (from Hawke's Bay); (substituted in) Siua Maile (from Manawatu); (substituted in) Raymond Tuputupu (from Manawatu)	Leni Apisai (short-term); Asafo Aumua; Dane Coles; Jacob Devery (short-term); Bruce Kauika-Petersen (short-term); Kianu Kereru-Symes (short-term); Siua Maile (short-term); James O'Reilly; Raymond Tuputupu (short-term)
LK	James Blackwell; Kane Le'aupepe (did not play); Liam Mitchell; Scott Scrafton; Isaia Walker-Leawere	(substituted off) Kane Le'aupepe (retired); (substituted off) Liam Mitchell (to (Italy) Zebre Parma)	(substituted in) Dominic Bird (from (France) Racing 92); (substituted in) Tom Parsons (from Hawke's Bay); (substituted in) Justin Sangster (from Bay of Plenty)	Dominic Bird; James Blackwell; Tom Parsons (short-term); Justin Sangster; Scott Scrafton; Isaia Walker-Leawere
BR	Gareth Evans; Vaea Fifita; Devan Flanders; Brayden Iose; Du'Plessis Kirifi; Reed Prinsep; Ardie Savea	(substituted off) Gareth Evans (to Highlanders); (substituted off) Vaea Fifita (to (England) Wasps)	(substituted in) Caleb Delany (from Wellington); (substituted in) Blake Gibson (from Blues); (substituted in) TK Howden (from Manawatu); (substituted in) Tyler Laubscher (from Manawatu)	Caleb Delany; Devan Flanders; Blake Gibson; TK Howden; Brayden Iose; Du'Plessis Kirifi; Tyler Laubscher; Reed Prinsep; Ardie Savea
SH	Jamie Booth (did not play); Luke Campbell; Cam Roigard (short-term); Jonathan Taumateine	(substituted off) Luke Campbell (to (France) Narbonne); (substituted off) Jonathan Taumateine (to Moana Pasifika)	(substituted in) Logan Henry (from Manawatu); (substituted in) Richard Judd (from Wellington); (substituted in) TJ Perenara (from (Japan) NTT Red Hurricanes)	Jamie Booth; Logan Henry (short-term); Richard Judd (short-term); TJ Perenara; Cam Roigard
FH	Jackson Garden-Bachop; Simon Hickey (did not play); Orbyn Leger (short-term)	(substituted off) Simon Hickey (to Crusaders); (substituted off) Orbyn Leger (to (Japan) Shimizu Koto Blue Sharks)	(substituted in) Aidan Morgan (from Wellington)	Jackson Garden-Bachop; Aidan Morgan
CE	Vince Aso; Ngani Laumape; Billy Proctor; Danny Toala; Peter Umaga-Jensen	(substituted off) Vince Aso (to (Japan) Saitama Wild Knights); (substituted off) Ngani Laumape (to (France) Stade Français); (substituted off) Danny Toala (to Moana Pasifika)	(substituted in) Riley Higgins (from Wellington); (substituted in) Bailyn Sullivan (from Chiefs); (substituted in) Teihorangi Walden (from Taranaki)	Riley Higgins (short-term); Billy Proctor; Bailyn Sullivan; Peter Umaga-Jensen; Teihorangi Walden
WG	Wes Goosen; Pepesana Patafilo; Salesi Rayasi; Julian Savea; Lolagi Visinia	(substituted off) Lolagi Visinia (to Moana Pasifika)	(substituted in) Josh Moorby (from Highlanders)	Wes Goosen; Josh Moorby; Pepesana Patafilo; Salesi Rayasi; Julian Savea
FB	Jordie Barrett; Ruben Love			Jordie Barrett; Ruben Love
Coach	Jason Holland			Jason Holland

== See also ==
- List of 2021–22 Premiership Rugby transfers
- List of 2021–22 United Rugby Championship transfers
- List of 2021–22 Top 14 transfers
- List of 2021–22 RFU Championship transfers
- List of 2021–22 Rugby Pro D2 transfers
- List of 2021–22 Major League Rugby transfers
- SANZAAR
- Super Rugby franchise areas
