= North Island (rugby union) =

New Zealand men's domestic rugby union team

- Full name: North Island
- Union: New Zealand Rugby
- Founded: 1897
- Ground: Eden Park
- Coach(es): John Plumtree and Scott McLeod
- Captain: Patrick Tuipulotu

The North Island is a New Zealand men's domestic rugby union team selected from the North Island's players, based on where they first played senior representative rugby. They played against the South Island in the North vs South match between 1897 and 2012.

A match was to be played on 29 August 2020 at Eden Park, but was delayed until a week later on 5 September and played at Sky Stadium, due to the COVID-19 pandemic.

2020 North Island Squad
**Props**: (New Zealand) Alex Fidow; (New Zealand) Ayden Johnstone; (New Zealand) **Angus Ta'avao**; (New Zealand) **Ofa Tu'ungafasi**; (New Zealand) **Karl Tu'inukuafe**; **Hookers**: (New Zealand) **Asafo Aumua**; (New Zealand) Ash Dixon; (New Zealand) Kurt Eklund; **Locks**: (New Zealand) Scott Scrafton; (New Zealand) **Patrick Tuipulotu** (c); (New Zealand) **Tupou Vaa'i**	**Loose forwards**: (New Zealand) Lachlan Boshier; (New Zealand) **Akira Ioane**; (New Zealand) **Dalton Papalii**; (New Zealand) **Ardie Savea**; (New Zealand) **Hoskins Sotutu**; **Halfbacks (scrum-halves)**: (New Zealand) **TJ Perenara**; (New Zealand) **Aaron Smith**; (New Zealand) **Te Toiroa Tahuriorangi**; **First five-eighths (fly-halves)**: (New Zealand) **Beauden Barrett**	**Midfielders (centres)**: (New Zealand) **Rieko Ioane**; (New Zealand) **Anton Lienert-Brown**; (New Zealand) **Peter Umaga-Jensen**; **Outside backs**: (New Zealand) **Caleb Clarke**; (New Zealand) Mitchell Hunt; (New Zealand) **Damian McKenzie**; (New Zealand) **Sevu Reece**; (New Zealand) Mark Tele'a
(C) denotes the team Captain and **Bold** denotes a player who is internationally capped
