= Josh Hohneck =

- Full name: Joshua Wolfe Hohneck
- Born: 6 January 1986 (age 40) Auckland, New Zealand
- Height: 191 cm (6 ft 3 in)
- Weight: 135 kg (298 lb; 21 st 4 lb)
- School: Waiuku College

Rugby union career
- Position: Prop
- Current team: Highlanders, Otago
Senior career
Years	Team	Apps	(Points)
2007–2015	Waikato	26	(5)
2009–2013	Bay of Plenty	40	(10)
2012–2014	Chiefs	18	(10)
2015–	Highlanders	54	(0)
2016–	Otago	24	(5)
2016–2020	Gloucester	101	(25)
- Correct as of 5 June 2022
International career
Years	Team	Apps	(Points)
2012	North Island	1	(0)
2015–2021	Māori All Blacks	4	(0)
2015	Barbarian F.C.	1	(0)
- Correct as of 5 June 2022

Joshua Wolfe Hohneck (born 6 January 1986) is a New Zealand rugby union footballer. His regular playing position is as a prop. He has played for the Championship winning Highlanders in Super Rugby and Waikato in the Mitre 10 Cup.

On 31 March 2016, Hohneck traveled to England to join Gloucester in the Premiership Rugby from the 2016–17 season.

On 23 July 2020, Hohneck announced he left Gloucester to return to New Zealand for personal reasons. Instead, he re-signed with Otago for the 2020 Mitre 10 Cup.

== Career honours ==
Chiefs

- Super Rugby – 2012, 2013

Highlanders

- Super Rugby – 2015
