= Ricky Riccitelli =

South African rugby union player

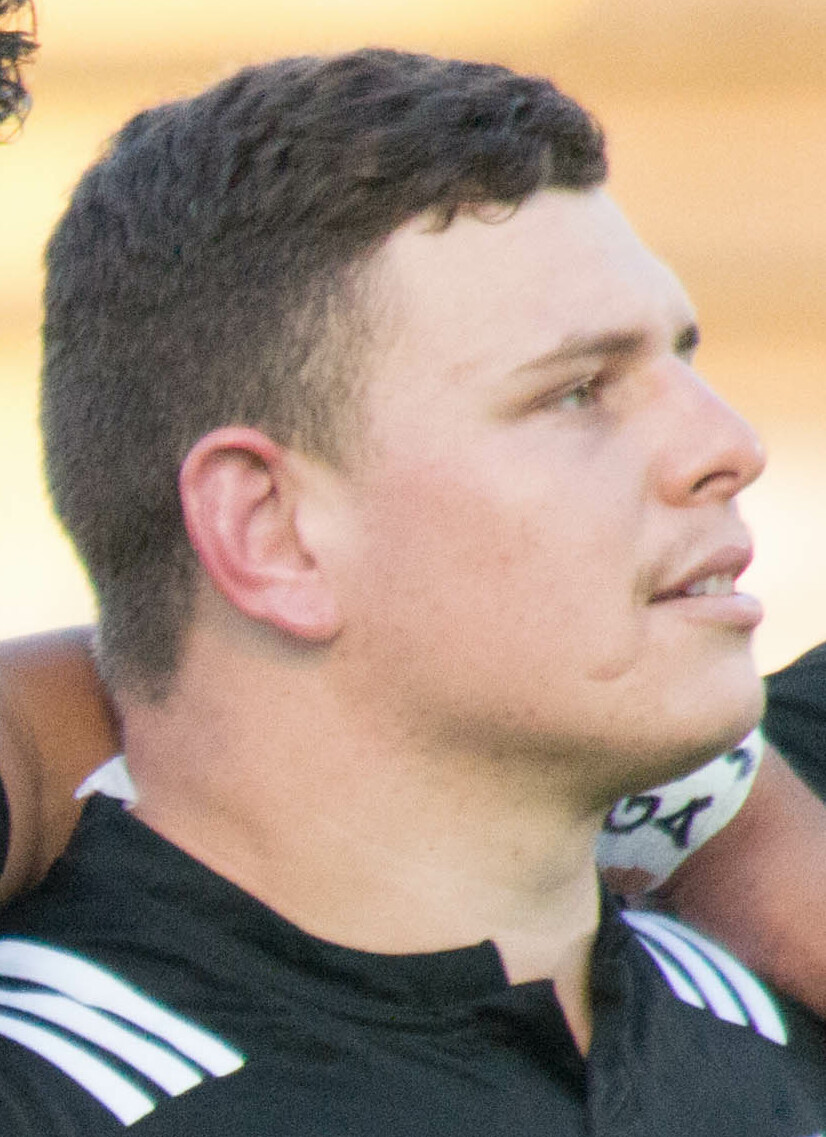
- Full name: John Ricky Riccitelli
- Born: 3 February 1995 (age 31) Durban, South Africa
- Height: 178 cm (5 ft 10 in)
- Weight: 110 kg (243 lb; 17 st 5 lb)
- School: Francis Douglas Memorial College
- University: University of Otago

Rugby union career
- Position: Hooker
- Current team: Taranaki, Blues
Senior career
Years	Team	Apps	(Points)
2015–2016	Hawke's Bay	18	(0)
2016–2021	Hurricanes	71	(25)
2017–2024	Taranaki	81	(105)
2022–2025	Blues	38	(70)
- Correct as of 2 January 2025
International career
Years	Team	Apps	(Points)
2015	New Zealand U20	7	(0)
2018	World XV	1	(0)
- Correct as of 23 June 2021

John Ricky Riccitelli (/ˌriːtʃɪˈtɛli/ REE-chih-TEL-ee; born 3 February 1995) is a professional rugby union player from New Zealand who plays as a hooker for the Blues in Super Rugby Pacific.

Riccitelli attended Francis Douglas Memorial College in New Plymouth. He was a member of the New Zealand squad that won the 2015 World Rugby Under 20 Championship, and made his provincial rugby debut for Hawke's Bay in 2015. Riccitelli played a further season with the Magpies before joining Taranaki in 2017 on an initial two-year contract.

In May 2025, the Blues announced that Riccitelli would leave New Zealand after the Super Rugby Pacific season to play in France.

== Early life ==
John Ricky Riccitelli was born on 3 February 1995 in Durban, the son of Gail Luiz and John Riccitelli. Riccitelli and his parents migrated to New Zealand when he was four-years-old after his mother got a job in the country. Settling in Ōakura, he grew up in New Plymouth where he attended Francis Douglas Memorial College. While at secondary school, Riccitelli excelled in sports like cricket and rugby union and was granted his school's sportsman of the year award in 2012. In cricket, he appeared in Taranaki junior grade sides, his school's first XI for four years since 2009 as well as the Central Districts under-19 squad.

He represented Taranaki in rugby at under-14 through under-18 levels and gained Hurricanes under-16 tournament team selection in 2012. While studying at Otago University for three years, Riccitelli played for the Southern club in Dunedin and also captained the Otago under-19s. In 2015, Riccitelli departed for the Under 20 World Championship in Italy, regularly spending time doing skill sessions with former Highlanders assistant coach Jon Preston. Having also turned out for New Zealand U20's in the Oceania Junior Championship earlier in the year, Riccitelli went on to feature in seven out of eight of the Baby Blacks' games, (including their historic win over England in the U20 WC final), starting at loosehead prop.

== Professional career ==
=== 2015–17 ===
Although there was interest from other provincial unions for Riccitelli, he ended up signing a two-year deal with Hawke's Bay under coach Craig Philpott in May 2015. Philpott was impressed with his performance after noticing him at the New Zealand under-20 trial camps. He made his debut for the province in 2015, playing the two out of the three pre-season Ranfurly Shield matches against Horowhenua-Kapiti and Mid Canterbury. He made a further six appearances during the 2015 ITM Cup season.

Riccitelli then joined the Hurricanes after being called up into the squad to replace the injured Dane Coles. He made his Super Rugby debut in the squads 23-man team to play the Brumbies in their season opener. He then had his short-term injury cover contract with the Hurricanes extended after his work ethic impressed the coaching staff. After the Hurricanes' success throughout the season, Riccitelli appeared in all three finals, including their grand final win over the Lions, impressing the Hurricanes' coaches with his accurate lineout throwing and strong ball-carrying.

In 2016 also saw Riccitelli feature in a disappointing Hawke's Bay team that finished in last place. He continued to make progress though as a starting loosehead prop during their Mitre 10 Cup campaign. Riccitelli, returned to his primary and preferred role of hooker when the side hosted Bay of Plenty, which was their final outing of the season at Napier's McLean Park. He extended his club's appearances to eighteen after he played in all ten of Hawke's Bay's matches, making it a season's personal best.

Riccitelli returned to his home province of Taranaki. Having already secured Jordie Barrett, Taranaki had lured Riccitelli for the 2017 and 2018 Mitre 10 Cup season's, him to signing a two-year deal. With hooker Rhys Marshall taking up an offer to play for Munster in Ireland at the end of the previous season, coach Colin Cooper said Riccitelli had a chance to claim the vacant hooker position.

Riccitelli became a regular starter for the Hurricanes in the 2017 Super Rugby season after another injury to Hurricanes' captain and first-choice All Blacks hooker Dane Coles. He was preferred over Leni Apisai for the role. Riccitelli was eventually called up as injury cover for the All Blacks' 2017 Rugby Championship, with Coles out of the first round and Liam Coltman out for the season. Riccitelli did not play in the competition and was released back to Taranaki after Coles recovered from his second concussion of the 2017 season.

=== 2018–present ===
Despite newly-capped All Black Asafo Aumua being signed to the Hurricanes for the 2018 Super Rugby season, Riccitelli held on to his place as a regular starter for the Hurricanes in the first three rounds of the competition. He started in all thirteen matches for the Hurricanes, played the third-most minutes for the side and made the second-most tackles before earning his second call-up for the New Zealand national team. Riccitelli was brought in as backup for Nathan Harris ahead of the third test against France in Dunedin.

Riccitelli returned for his second Mitre 10 Cup season with Taranaki after being included in their 47-man squad to defend the Ranfurly Shield. He was named player of the year for the province after appearing in nine out of twelve matches during the 2018 campaign. Riccitelli later gained selection honours with Robbie Deans' World XV against Japan in Osaka after being named among the ten replacements. The side also featured current New Zealand internationals Nehe Milner-Skudder and Jackson Hemopo.

Riccitelli rejoined the Hurricanes squad for their upcoming season after head coach John Plumtree included him in the 2019 Super Rugby side announcement in October 2018. He made his first appearance of 2019 against the Waratahs at Brookvale Oval on 16 February. Riccitelli made his 50th appearance for the Hurricanes franchise alongside Vaea Fifita after being named to start the match at Westpac Stadium against the Crusaders.

== Statistics ==
Club	Year	Competition	GP	GS	TRY	CON	PEN	DGL	PTS	WL%	Yellow card	Red card
Hawke's Bay	2015†	Bunnings NPC (incl. Ranfurly Shield)	8	2	0	0	0	0	0	87.50	0	0
Hawke's Bay	2016	Bunnings NPC (incl. Ranfurly Shield)	10	9	0	0	0	0	0	20.00	0	0
Taranaki	2017†	Bunnings NPC (incl. Ranfurly Shield)	9	8	3	0	0	0	15	77.78	0	0
Taranaki	2018	Bunnings NPC (incl. Ranfurly Shield)	9	9	0	0	0	0	0	22.22	0	0
Taranaki	2019	Bunnings NPC (incl. Ranfurly Shield)	9	9	1	0	0	0	5	33.33	0	0
Taranaki	2020†	Bunnings NPC (incl. Ranfurly Shield)	11	6	2	0	0	0	10	36.36	0	0
Taranaki	2021†	Bunnings NPC (incl. Ranfurly Shield)	10	6	1	0	0	0	5	100.00	0	0
Hurricanes	2016†	Super Rugby Pacific	9	1	0	0	0	0	0	77.78	0	0
Hurricanes	2017	Super Rugby Pacific	18	14	1	0	0	0	5	72.22	0	0
Hurricanes	2018	Super Rugby Pacific	18	18	2	0	0	0	10	66.67	0	0
Hurricanes	2019	Super Rugby Pacific	12	6	0	0	0	0	0	75.00	0	0
Hurricanes	2020	Super Rugby Pacific	7	1	0	0	0	0	0	71.43	0	0
Hurricanes	2021	Super Rugby Pacific	7	1	2	0	0	0	10	28.57	0	0
Blues	2022	Super Rugby Pacific	0	0	0	0	0	0	0	0.00	0	0
Career			137	90	12	0	0	0	60	60.58	0	0

Updated: 12 June 2022 Source: John R Riccitelli Rugby History
