= Blake Gibson =

New Zealand rugby player (born 1995)

- Born: 19 April 1995 (age 31) Auckland, New Zealand
- Height: 186 cm (6 ft 1 in)
- Weight: 102 kg (16 st 1 lb; 225 lb)
- School: St. Kentigern College

Rugby union career
- Position(s): Flanker, Number 8
- Current team: Red Hurricanes Osaka
Senior career
Years	Team	Apps	(Points)
2014–2022	Auckland	42	(40)
2015–2021	Blues	54	(30)
2022	Hurricanes	10	(15)
2022–2023	Suntory Sungoliath	0	(0)
2023–	Red Hurricanes Osaka	25	(55)
- Correct as of 5 June 2022
International career
Years	Team	Apps	(Points)
2015	New Zealand U20	6	(20)
- Correct as of 5 June 2022

Blake Gibson (born 19 April 1995) is a New Zealand rugby union player who currently plays as a loose forward for Auckland in the ITM Cup and the Blues in Super Rugby.

== Early career ==
Born in Auckland, Gibson attended Saint Kentigern College in the city and captained their first XV to victory in their local 1A championship. This led to his selection in the Blues Development XV later in the year.

== Senior career ==
Gibson joined the Auckland ITM Cup team in his first year out of school and made a total of 9 appearances in his first full season scoring 2 tries. Named again to play in the Auckland side for the 2015 ITM Cup, he started the opening game of the season at openside flanker, but suffered a knee injury in the first ten minutes that kept him out for the duration of the campaign. The 2016 New Zealand domestic season didn't bring much more luck as he mustered 2 tries in 2 matches before again missing the remainder of the year through injury as his Auckland side missed out on the Premiership Play-offs and finished up in 5th position on the log standings.

== Super Rugby ==
Gibson's first season at provincial level made a big enough impression that he was offered a contract as a member of the Blues wider training squad for the 2015 Super Rugby season. He debuted for the Blues against the Crusaders, on the day before his 20th birthday and was named for his first start against the Hurricanes on 24 May 2015. The 2016 Super Rugby season saw him earn plenty of game time under new head coach, Tana Umaga. He made 9 appearances, 6 of which were from the start and scored his debut Super Rugby try, making easy work of All Blacks fullback Ben Smith by throwing him and 3 other defenders off. Despite his injury struggles during the later half of the year, Gibson was again named in the Blues squad for 2017. Gibson is now in the hurricanes playing number 7.

== International ==
Gibson was named to start for an experienced NZ Barbarians side that played against the Maori All Blacks, shortly after the conclusion of the 2015 Super Rugby Season. Playing at openside flanker, he scored the first try of the game in a standout performance.

He was also a vital member of the New Zealand under-20 side which won the 2015 World Rugby Under 20 Championship. He scored 2 tries in 4 championship games and was named player's player of the day on 3 occasions during the tournament.

Gibson was called up to the All Blacks in 2017 as injury cover following Sam Cane's concussion. Gibson has yet to be capped for New Zealand.

== Career honours ==
New Zealand Under-20

- World Rugby Under 20 Championship - 2015

== Super Rugby statistics ==
As of 26 November 2016

Season	Team	Games	Starts	Sub	Mins	Tries	Cons	Pens	Drops	Points	Yel	Red
2015	Blues	4	1	3	129	0	0	0	0	0	0	0
2016	Blues	9	6	3	535	1	0	0	0	5	0	0
Total		13	7	6	664	1	0	0	0	5	0	0
