= Mitchell Brown (rugby union) =

NZ rugby union player

- Born: 15 August 1993 (age 33) New Plymouth, New Zealand
- Height: 194 cm (6 ft 4 in)
- Weight: 110 kg (243 lb; 17 st 5 lb)
- School: New Plymouth Boys' High School

Rugby union career
- Position(s): Lock, Flanker, Number 8
- Current team: Kintetsu Liners
Senior career
Years	Team	Apps	(Points)
2012–2022	Taranaki	42	(5)
2016–2022	Chiefs	55	(15)
2022–2024	Canon Eagles	15	(10)
2024–	Kintetsu Liners	19	(10)
- Correct as of 16 July 2021

Mitchell Brown (born 15 August 1993) is a New Zealand rugby union player who played as a lock or loose forward for Taranaki in New Zealand's domestic Mitre 10 Cup and the Chiefs in the international Super Rugby competition.

== Early career ==
Born and raised in Inglewood on New Zealand's North Island, he attended New Plymouth Boys' High School in his hometown where he played first XV rugby. After leaving school, he started playing for Inglewood in Taranaki's club rugby competition.

== Senior career ==
Brown debuted for his home province, Taranaki in a Ranfurly Shield defense against King Country in 2012 while aged just 18 years old, but had to wait until the following year before making his national provincial championship bow.

2014 saw him play 4 times, all from the replacements bench as Taranaki lifted the ITM Cup Premiership title with a 36–32 win over Tasman in the final. In 2015 he began to establish himself as a regular starter, playing 9 times, mainly as a lock as the Bulls were knocked out at the semi-final stage. They again reached the tournament's last 4 in 2016, with Brown playing in all 11 of their games during the campaign.

== Super Rugby ==
An injury crisis among the Chiefs loose forwards during the 2016 Super Rugby season saw Brown called up as an injury replacement. He made 2 substitute appearances and also started the Chiefs one-off midweek match against Wales. He was subsequently named in the franchise's full squad for the 2017 season.

== International ==
Brown turned out for New Zealand Under-17 in 2010 and was a New Zealand Schools representative in 2011.

== Career Honours ==
Taranaki

- Mitre 10 Cup Premiership - 2014

== Super Rugby Statistics ==
As of 17 December 2016

Season	Team	Games	Starts	Sub	Mins	Tries	Cons	Pens	Drops	Points	Yel	Red
2016	Chiefs	2	0	2	30	0	0	0	0	0	0	0
Total		2	0	2	30	0	0	0	0	0	0	0
