= Christian Lio-Willie =

New Zealand rugby union player

- Born: Christian Javan Lio-Willie; 26 August 1998 (age 28) Auckland, New Zealand
- Height: 189 cm (6 ft 2 in)
- Weight: 111 kg (17 st 7 lb; 245 lb)
- School: Massey High School
- University: University of Otago

Rugby union career
- Position(s): Number 8, Flanker
- Current team: Otago, Crusaders
Senior career
Years	Team	Apps	(Points)
2021–	Otago	31	(15)
2022	Highlanders	2	(0)
2023–	Crusaders	42	(50)
- Correct as of June 13 2025
International career
Years	Team	Apps	(Points)
2022–2023	All Blacks XV	4	(0)
2025	New Zealand	2	(0)
- Correct as of 15 July 2023

Christian Javan Lio-Willie (born 26 August 1998) is a New Zealand rugby union player who plays for the Crusaders in Super Rugby and Otago in the Bunnings NPC. His playing position is loose forward.

== Early life ==
Lio-Willie attended Massey High School in Auckland. At age 18, he moved to Dunedin to attend the University of Otago. He has played club rugby for Kaikorai RFC in Dunedin.

== Rugby career ==
Lio-Willie joined the Otago wider training squad in 2020; however, he would not make an appearance that season.

In 2021, Lio-Willie made his debut for Otago in a 26-19 win against to Southland on 7 August where he made a rampaging break in the 78th minute that set up the winning try of the match. On 15 October, he played 42 minutes in a 24–13 win against Northland.

During the 2025 Super Rugby season, Lio-Willie was a stand out player for the Crusaders with his impressive form helping the team to its 13th Super Rugby title. Playing the season at No.8 he was selected in the All Blacks 35 man squad as injury cover for Luke Jacobson.

== Personal life ==
As of 2021, Lio-Willie is in his fifth year studying dentistry at the University of Otago. He is of Samoan descent.
