= Inga Finau =

- Full name: Kaveinga Finau
- Born: 21 August 1994 (age 32) Auckland, New Zealand
- Height: 1.77 m (5 ft 10 in)
- Weight: 94 kg (14 st 11 lb; 207 lb)
- School: Dilworth School
- University: University of Canterbury

Rugby union career
- Position: Second Five-Eighth
- Current team: Auckland
Senior career
| Years | Team | Apps | (Points) |
| 2016– | Canterbury | 7 | (15) |
| | Auckland | 1 | |
- Correct as of 13 November 2016
International career
| Years | Team | Apps | (Points) |
| 2014 | New Zealand U20 | 3 | (0) |
- Correct as of 13 November 2016

Inga Finau (born 21 August 1994) is a New Zealand rugby union player who currently plays as a second five-eighth for Canterbury in New Zealand's domestic Mitre 10 Cup.

== Early career ==
After attending high school at the Dilworth School in his native Auckland, Finau headed south to Christchurch to study sports coaching at the University of Canterbury. There, he attended the Crusaders Academy and played club rugby with the Christchurch Rugby Club.

== Senior career ==
Impressive form at club level saw Finau named in the Canterbury Mitre 10 Cup squad for the first time in 2016. He made 7 appearances of which 6 came from the replacements bench and scored 1 try as the Cantabrians lifted the Premiership title, their 8th in 9 seasons.

== International ==
Finau was a member of the New Zealand Under 20 team which competed in the 2014 IRB Junior World Championship in his home country. He made 3 appearances and didn't score any tries.
