= Oli Jager =

Irish rugby union player

- Full name: Oliver Jager
- Born: 5 July 1995 (age 31) London, England
- Height: 192 cm (6 ft 4 in)
- Weight: 128 kg (282 lb; 20 st 2 lb)
- School: Blackrock College

Rugby union career
- Position: Prop
- Current team: Munster Rugby
Senior career
Years	Team	Apps	(Points)
2016–2023	Canterbury	27	(5)
2017–2023	Crusaders	51	(20)
2023–2026	Munster	35	(0)
- Correct as of 25 April 2026
International career
Years	Team	Apps	(Points)
2013	Ireland U18 Schools		
2017	New Zealand Barbarians	1	(0)
2024	Ireland	1	(0)
2025	Ireland A	1	(0)
- Correct as of 23 February 2025

Oliver Jager (born 5 July 1995) is a retired Irish rugby union player who played as a prop for Munster. Previously he represented Canterbury in New Zealand's domestic Mitre 10 Cup and the Crusaders in the international Super Rugby competition. In November 2023, he announced that he was joining Munster Rugby from 1 December 2023. Jager made his international debut for Ireland on 24 February 2024 coming on as a replacement in the Six Nations match against Wales.

== Early life ==
Jager was born in London to an Irish mother and Dutch father, and soon after moved to Ireland where he was raised. Jager attended Newbridge College in Kildare & Blackrock College in Dublin, where his father, Harm Jager, was a strength and conditioning coach. Harm previously represented the Netherlands men's national water polo team. He played for the Ireland U18 Schools side in 2013 but he missed selection for the Leinster Rugby academy system. Jager travelled to New Zealand in 2013 to attend the Crusaders International High Performance Unit and subsequently turned out for the Crusaders Academy and the Crusaders Knights development team. During this time he also started playing club rugby in the Canterbury area with New Brighton RFC

== Club career ==
=== Canterbury ===
Jager's dedication in coming to New Zealand in order to further his rugby career paid off in 2016, when great form at club level saw him named in the Canterbury squad for the Mitre 10 Cup. With the Cantabrians already possessing Super Rugby props in the shape of Alex Hodgman, Siate Tokolahi and Daniel Lienert-Brown, Jager's appearances in his first season were largely limited to cameos from the replacements bench. He started once and came on as a replacement seven times as his side lifted the Premiership trophy for the 8th time in 9 seasons.

=== Crusaders ===
His debut season at provincial level saw him coached by Canterbury legend Scott Robertson and like his coach, Jager found himself promoted to Super Rugby level in 2017, earning a contract with the Crusaders.

=== Munster ===
In November 2023, Jager was signed to Munster Rugby. He made his debut for Munster coming on as a replacement in the victory over Glasgow Warriors on 1 December 2023.

In June 2026 it was announced that Jager would retire forthwith on medical grounds, aged 30, having suffered a number of concussions over the preceding few years.

== International career ==
Jager was selected for the Ireland national schoolboy rugby union team in the 2013 Rugby Europe Under-18 Championship semi-final match against France. Ireland lost the match and went on to claim a third-place finish in the Championship.

In 2017 he was named in the New Zealand Barbarians squad ahead of the 2017 British & Irish Lions tour to New Zealand and played in the opening game of the tour, losing 7–13 to the Lions.

In 2022, he was named in an All Blacks XV squad for a northern hemisphere tour which would have ruled him out of playing for Ireland, but was injured before the tour and did not travel.

On 24 February 2024 Jager made his international debut for Ireland in a 31–7 victory over Wales in round 3 of the 2024 Six Nations.
