= Liam Coombes-Fabling =

New Zealand rugby union player

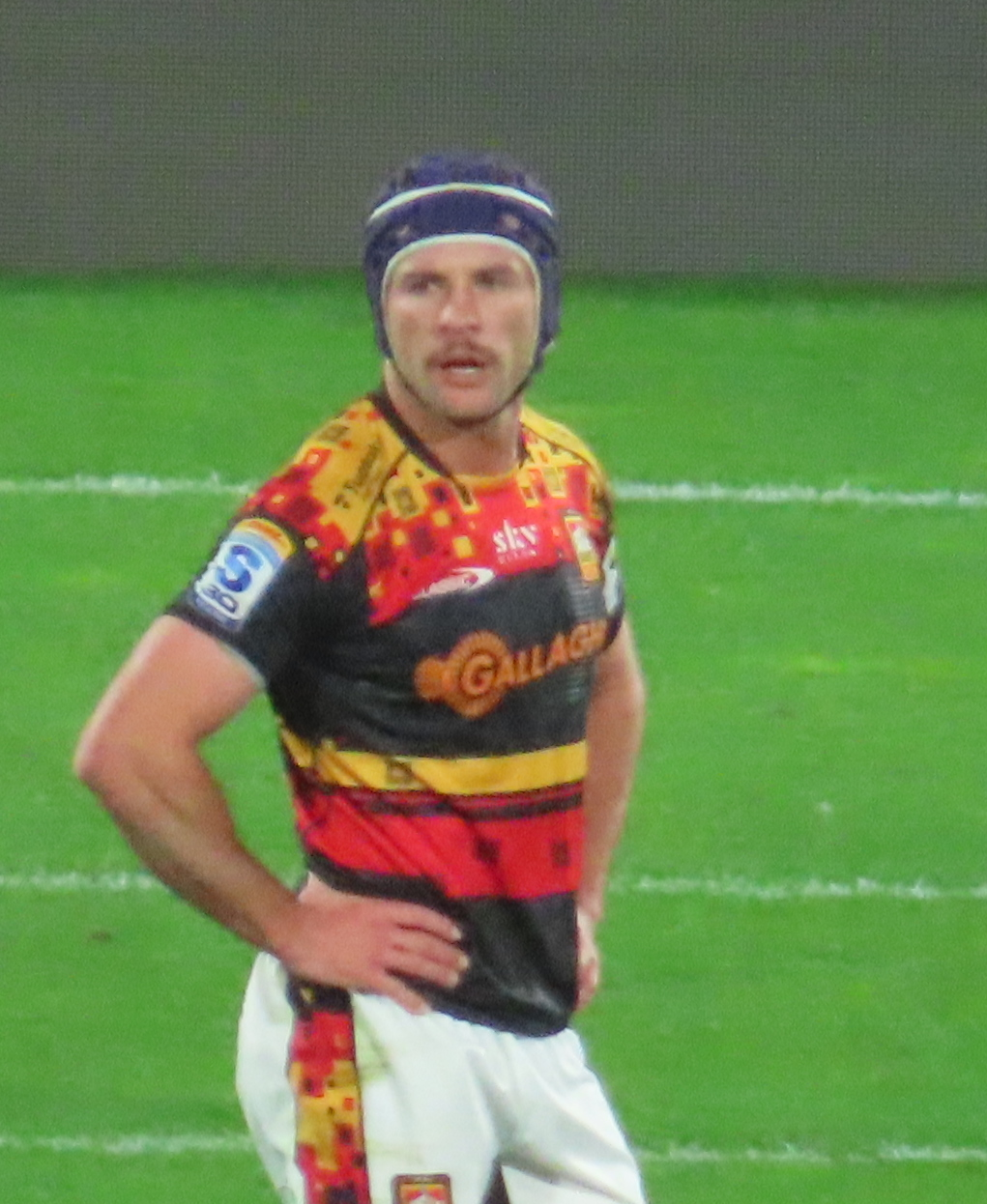
- Coombes-Fabling playing for the Chiefs at the 2026 Super Rugby Pacific final
- Born: Liam Coombes-Fabling; 7 July 1998 (age 28) Hamilton, New Zealand
- Height: 1.80 m (5 ft 11 in)
- Weight: 83 kg (13 st 1 lb; 183 lb)
- School: St. John's College, Hamilton

Rugby union career
- Position(s): Wing, first five-eighth
Senior career
Years	Team	Apps	(Points)
2020–	Waikato	32	(60)
- Correct as of 13 December 2023
Super Rugby
Years	Team	Apps	(Points)
2022	Highlanders	6	(5)
2023-	Chiefs	9	(15)

Liam Coombes-Fabling (born 7 July 1998) is a New Zealand rugby union player for Waikato in the National Provincial Championship (NPC). His playing position is wing.

== Early life ==
Coombes-Fabling attended St. John's College, Hamilton.

== Rugby career ==
Coombes-Fabling played for the Waikato under-19s team at the Jock Hobbs Memorial Tournament in 2017. Playing at first five-eighth, Coombes-Fabling led Waikato to the final; they would go on to lose 30–17 in the final against Auckland.

Since 2020 he has played for Waikato in the NPC. He scored 3 tries in the 2020 season. On 24 September 2021, Coombes-Fabling scored two tries in a winning effort against Tasman which moved Waikato to the top of the NPC Premiership Division standings. On 1 October he scored a hat-trick in a 38–28 loss against Northland.
