= Hamish Dalzell =

New Zealand rugby union player

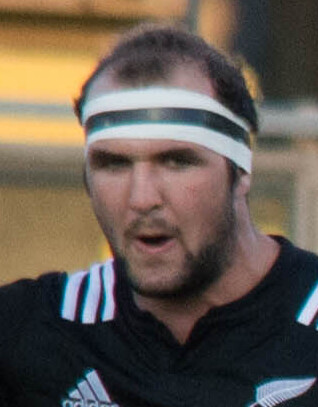
- Born: 16 January 1996 (age 30) New Zealand
- Height: 201 cm (6 ft 7 in)
- Weight: 120 kg (260 lb; 18 st 13 lb)
- Notable relative(s): Adam Whitelock (cousin); George Whitelock (cousin); Luke Whitelock (cousin); Sam Whitelock (cousin); Will Jordan (cousin)

Rugby union career
- Position: Lock
Senior career
Years	Team	Apps	(Points)
2016–2018	Canterbury	17	(0)
2020	Panasonic Wild Knights	5	(5)
2020–2022	Auckland	9	(0)
2023	Rugby New York		
2023-2025	Kamaishi Seawaves	27	(18)
- Correct as of 25 April 2023
Super Rugby
Years	Team	Apps	(Points)
2	Crusaders		
International career
Years	Team	Apps	(Points)
2015–2016	New Zealand U20	8	(5)
- Correct as of 24 August 2021

Hamish Dalzell (born 16 January 1996 in New Zealand) is a New Zealand rugby union player who plays for Auckland in the National Provincial Championship. He also plays for Kamaishi Seawaves. His playing position is lock.
