= Sione Mafileo =

NZ rugby union player (born 1993)

- Full name: Sione Tulimaiau Mafileo
- Born: 14 April 1993 (age 33) Auckland, New Zealand
- Height: 180 cm (5 ft 11 in)
- Weight: 135 kg (298 lb; 21 st 4 lb)
- School: Saint Kentigern College
- Notable relative: Tevita Mafileo (brother)

Rugby union career
- Position: Prop
- Current team: North Harbour, Chiefs
Senior career
Years	Team	Apps	(Points)
2014–2025	North Harbour	93	(20)
2015–2020	Blues	53	(0)
2021-2023	Chiefs	13	(0)
2024-2025	Moana Pasifika	16	(15)
2025-	US Montauban	8	(0)
- Correct as of 4 October 2025
International career
Years	Team	Apps	(Points)
2013	New Zealand U20	5	(0)
2020	Moana Pasifika	1	(0)
- Correct as of 27 August 2024

Sione Tulimaiau Mafileo (born 14 April 1993) is a New Zealand rugby union footballer who currently plays as a prop for North Harbour in the ITM Cup and the Moana Pasifika in the international Super Rugby competition.

== Early career ==
Mafileo attended Saint Kentigern College in Auckland and won the Auckland schools competition with them in 2012.

== Senior career ==
Despite being named in North Harbour's squad for the 2013 ITM Cup, serious illness prevented him from making any appearances that year. He managed to make it onto the field the following season, but was merely a bit part player, playing 3 times. 2015 was when he really started to establish himself as Harbour's first choice in the number 3 jersey, he played 9 times that season, all of his appearances coming from the start. He continued to be a regular in North Harbour's Championship winning season in 2016, playing in all 12 of their games during the campaign and scoring his first ever provincial try as Harbour upset the more fancied Wellington and Otago to win promotion to the Mitre 10 Cup Premiership for 2017.

== Super Rugby ==
Despite only having 3 provincial appearances at the time, Mafileo was called up by the Blues to provide front-row injury cover in the latter part of the 2015 Super Rugby season. He debuted in a New Zealand derby match against the Crusaders and made one other appearance from the replacements bench before the campaign was out. The Blues, under new head-coach Tana Umaga retained his services for 2016 and he went on to play 6 times during the year, including his first 2 starts for the franchise. He was again named in the Blues squad for the 2017 season.

== International ==
Mafileo was a New Zealand Schoolboys representative in 2011 and was a member of the New Zealand Under 20 which competed in the 2013 IRB Junior World Championship in France where he made 5 appearances.

== Career Honours ==
North Harbour

- Mitre 10 Cup Championship - 2016

== Super Rugby Statistics ==
As of 26 November 2016

Season	Team	Games	Starts	Sub	Mins	Tries	Cons	Pens	Drops	Points	Yel	Red
2015	Blues	2	0	2	71	0	0	0	0	0	0	0
2016	Blues	6	2	4	159	0	0	0	0	0	1	0
Total		8	2	6	230	0	0	0	0	0	1	0
