= Ayden Johnstone =

New Zealand rugby union player

- Full name: Colin Ayden Johnstone
- Born: 24 October 1996 (age 30) Hamilton, New Zealand
- Height: 184 cm (6 ft 0 in)
- Weight: 122 kg (269 lb; 19 st 3 lb)
- School: Hamilton Boys' High School

Rugby union career
- Position: Prop
- Current team: Waikato, Highlanders
Senior career
Years	Team	Apps	(Points)
2016–	Waikato	33	(0)
2019–	Highlanders	40	(5)
- Correct as of 5 June 2022
International career
Years	Team	Apps	(Points)
2016	New Zealand U20	6	(0)
2020	North Island	1	(0)
- Correct as of 5 June 2022

Colin Ayden Johnstone (born 24 October 1996 in Hamilton, New Zealand) is a New Zealand rugby union player who plays for the Highlanders in Super Rugby. His playing position is prop. He was first signed to the Highlanders squad in 2019.
