= Max Hicks (rugby union) =

New Zealand Rugby player

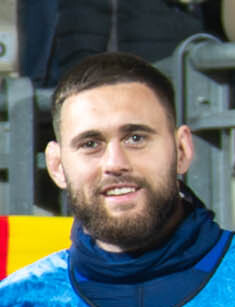
- Born: 15 September 1999 (age 27) Auckland, New Zealand
- Height: 199 cm (6 ft 6 in)
- Weight: 112 kg (17 st 9 lb; 247 lb)
- School: Rosmini College

Rugby union career
- Position(s): Lock, Flanker
- Current team: Newcastle Red Bulls
Senior career
Years	Team	Apps	(Points)
2021–2024	Tasman	30	(25)
2022–2024	Highlanders	21	(5)
2025–2026	Perpignan	17	(0)
2026–	Newcastle Red Bulls	0	(0)
- Correct as of 9 June 2025
International career
Years	Team	Apps	(Points)
2022–2024	Māori All Blacks	2	(0)
- Correct as of 9 June 2025

Max Hicks (born 15 September 1999) is a New Zealand-born England rugby union player who plays for Newcastle Red Bulls and England A. His position is lock or blindslide flanker.

== Career ==
Hicks played his club rugby for Marist in Tāhunanui. He was named in the Tasman Mako squad for the 2021 Bunnings NPC. Hicks made his debut for Tasman in Round 3 of the competition against Northland, coming off the bench in a 29–48 win for the Mako. The side went on to make the final before losing 23–20 to Waikato. He was named in the Highlanders squad for the 2022 Super Rugby Pacific season. Hicks made his debut for the Highlanders in Round 8 of the 2022 season, coming off the bench against Moana Pasifika in a 37–17 win for the Highlanders. Hicks was named as a late replacement in the Māori All Blacks squad to play Ireland in late June early July 2022.

On 12 November 2024, Hicks would move to France to sign for Perpignan in the Top 14 for the 2025–26 season. On 29 January 2026, Hicks would leave Perpignan to sign for English club Newcastle Red Bulls on a two-year contract in the Premiership Rugby from the 2026–27 season.

On the 6th November, Hicks came on as a substitute for the England A national team Vs Argentina XV.

== Personal life ==
Hicks is a New Zealander of Māori descent (Ngāti Ranginui descent), and qualifies for England Rugby through his Cornish mother.
