= Laghlan McWhannell =

- Born: 20 October 1998 (age 28) Cambridge, New Zealand
- Height: 198 cm (6 ft 6 in)
- Weight: 114 kg (251 lb; 17 st 13 lb)
- School: St. Peter's School

Rugby union career
- Position: Lock
- Current team: Waikato, Canon Eagles
Senior career
Years	Team	Apps	(Points)
2017–	Waikato	30	(25)
2020–2023	Chiefs	7	(5)
2024-2026	Blues	23	(10)
2026–	Canon Eagles		
- Correct as of 17 July 2023
International career
Years	Team	Apps	(Points)
2018	New Zealand U20	6	(0)
- Correct as of 20 June 2020

Laghlan McWhannell (born 29 October 1998 in New Zealand) is a New Zealand rugby union player who played for the Chiefs and plays for the Blues in Super Rugby. His playing position is lock. He signed for the Chiefs squad in 2019.

== Personal life ==
McWhannell is a New Zealander of Māori descent (Ngāti Kahungunu descent).
