= Reuben O'Neill =

NZ rugby union player

- Full name: Reuben Graeme O'Neill
- Born: 17 February 1995 (age 31) New Plymouth, New Zealand
- Height: 183 cm (6 ft 0 in)
- Weight: 115 kg (254 lb; 18 st 2 lb)
- School: New Plymouth Boys' High School

Rugby union career
- Position: Prop
- Current team: Taranaki, Chiefs
Senior career
Years	Team	Apps	(Points)
2015–	Taranaki	51	(10)
2020–	Chiefs	44	(5)
- Correct as of 12 June 2022

Reuben Graeme O'Neill (/oʊˈnil/; born 17 February 1995) is a professional rugby union player from New Zealand who represents the Chiefs in Super Rugby Pacific and Taranaki in the NPC. His primary position is tighthead prop.

== Early life ==
Reuben Graeme O'Neill was born on 17 February 1995 in New Plymouth, the son of Jarrod O'Neill and Delwyn McCurdy. O'Neill sustained multiple long-term injuries throughout his early career. In 2011 he underwent an operation to remove a bone cyst on his left foot. Later that year, he was diagnosed with diabetes which he manages daily with insulin injections. He overcame both injuries, playing strongly for New Plymouth Boys' High School first XV and making the Taranaki under-18 side.

After his last year at New Plymouth Boys', O'Neill was enrolled into the 23-man New Zealand Secondary Schools team for a two-match international series in Auckland against Samoa and Australia. He alongside openside flanker Lachlan Boshier were the only two players from New Plymouth that gained selection. O'Neill also was the first prop to make the national side since former New Zealand international and Taranaki representative Gordon Slater.

== Professional career ==
=== 2015–17 ===
Following a back injury, O'Neill was one of four new players that were recruited by Taranaki in preparation to defend their national ITM Cup title for the 2015 season. He made his debut for the province, making the match-day reserves to play Auckland after missing an opportunity to come on as a replacement against Wellington the previous week. O'Neill was involved in the Taranaki under-19 side to compete at the Jock Hobbs memorial tournament later that year. A week out, O'Neill snapped his achilles tendon and would require surgery after suffering a 42–10 defeat in a qualifying match against Waikato in Te Awamutu.

Unavailable to injury in early 2016, O'Neill missed selection in the Chiefs development squad for their tour of Hong Kong in April. His performance at premier club level saw him rejoin the Taranaki squad for their upcoming season after head coach Colin Cooper named his inclusion during the pre-season side announcement. O'Neill started well for Taranaki, scoring his first career try in the 2016 Mitre 10 Cup competition against Manawatu. O'Neill also appeared in their second home semi-final in three years, against Tasman.

O'Neill was one of 22 forwards called up into the 2017 Chiefs 41-man development squad for their second consecutive visit of Hong Kong. He also made two appearances against the Blues development team in March, the first taking place at FMG Stadium Waikato serving as a curtain raiser and the rematch taking place two weeks later at Pakuranga Rugby Football Club in Auckland. O'Neill returned for his third Mitre 10 Cup season with Taranaki after injuries sustained by fellow prop Mike Kainga. He was a part of Taranaki's historic Ranfurly Shield victory over Canterbury and their impressive top of the table finish.

=== 2018–present ===
O'Neill gained selection honours with the Canterbury-based side the Crusaders, on 31 January during their pre-season opener against the Hurricanes ahead of the 2018 Super Rugby season. He then had his selection honours with the Crusaders extended as a short-term injury cover replacement. O'Neill became a regular starter in the 2018 Mitre 10 Cup despite featuring in a disappointing Taranaki campaign that finished in last place. He returned to play in the seasons first two Ranfurly Shield defenses against Poverty Bay and Wanganui. At seasons-end he was awarded forward of the year for the union.

Following his 2018 provincial campaign, O'Neill was called up into the wider All Blacks squad to prepare for the Japanese leg of the 2018 end of year tour without making a Super Rugby debut.

O'Neill's versatility, being able to play both sides of the scrum in the prop position, caught the attention of the Chiefs selectors and was named in the franchises squad for their 2019 Super Rugby season.

== Statistics ==
Club	Year	Competition	GP	GS	TRY	CON	PEN	DGL	PTS	WL%	Yellow card	Red card
Taranaki	2015	Bunnings NPC (incl. Ranfurly Shield)	3	0	0	0	0	0	0	33.33	0	0
Taranaki	2016	Bunnings NPC (incl. Ranfurly Shield)	10	4	1	0	0	0	5	60.00	0	0
Taranaki	2017†	Bunnings NPC (incl. Ranfurly Shield)	6	1	0	0	0	0	0	83.33	0	0
Taranaki	2018	Bunnings NPC (incl. Ranfurly Shield)	12	11	0	0	0	0	0	33.33	0	0
Taranaki	2019	Bunnings NPC (incl. Ranfurly Shield)	4	4	0	0	0	0	0	75.00	0	0
Taranaki	2020†	Bunnings NPC (incl. Ranfurly Shield)	11	9	1	0	0	0	5	36.36	0	0
Taranaki	2021†	Bunnings NPC (incl. Ranfurly Shield)	5	5	0	0	0	0	0	100.00	0	0
Chiefs	2020	Super Rugby Pacific	10	2	0	0	0	0	0	20.00	0	0
Chiefs	2021	Super Rugby Pacific	5	3	1	0	0	0	5	40.00	0	0
Career			66	39	3	0	0	0	15	48.48	0	0

Updated: 12 June 2022 Source: Reuben G O'Neill Rugby History
