= Scott Scrafton =

NZ rugby union player

- Born: 18 April 1993 (age 33) Auckland, New Zealand
- Height: 200 cm (6 ft 7 in)
- Weight: 118 kg (260 lb; 18 st 8 lb)
- School: St. Kentigern College

Rugby union career
- Position: Lock
- Current team: Benetton
Senior career
Years	Team	Apps	(Points)
2014–2021	Auckland	41	(5)
2016–2019	Blues	23	(20)
2020–2022	Hurricanes	27	(0)
2022–2026	Benetton	30	(0)
- Correct as of 31 Dec 2022
International career
Years	Team	Apps	(Points)
2013	New Zealand U20	4	(5)
2020	North Island	1	(0)
- Correct as of 5 June 2022

Scott Scrafton (born 18 April 1993) is a retired New Zealand rugby union player who most recently played as a lock for Benetton in the United Rugby Championship competition.

== Early career ==
Scrafton completed 5 years at Kelston boys' High School, later attended Saint Kentigern College, one of Auckland's premier rugby schools and helped them to win the Auckland senior college final in 2011. Additionally after building a reputation for himself in the Auckland club scene, he spent 2 years with the Blues development team.

== Senior career ==
Although not initially named in the Auckland squad for the 2014 ITM Cup, Scrafton did manage to work his way into the senior team that year, making 2 substitute appearances with his debut coming in a match against the Bay of Plenty. A full squad member in 2015, he played 10 times as Auckland reached the Premiership final before going down narrowly to Canterbury. He continued to be a regular starter through 2016, playing in all 10 of Auckland's games during a disappointing season for them which culminated in a 5th place finish on the Premiership log. He played with Auckland until 2021 season.

== Super Rugby ==
After spending 2 years with their development side, Scrafton was handed a wider training group contract with the Auckland based Blues franchise ahead of the 2016 Super Rugby season. Due to strong competition from more experienced locks such as Josh Bekhuis and Patrick Tuipulotu, he was limited to just one substitute appearance against the Waratahs. Bekhuis' subsequent departure for France at the end of the season, opened up a spot on the roster for 2017 and Scrafton was upgraded to the Blues first team squad by coach Tana Umaga. He played with Blues until 2019 and with Hurricanes from 2020 to 2022 season.

== International ==
He was a New Zealand Schools representative in 2011 and was also a member of the New Zealand Under 20 team which finished 4th in the 2013 IRB Junior World Championship in France.

== Super Rugby Statistics ==
As of 26 November 2016

Season	Team	Games	Starts	Sub	Mins	Tries	Cons	Pens	Drops	Points	Yel	Red
2016	Blues	1	0	1	12	0	0	0	0	0	0	0
Total		1	0	1	12	0	0	0	0	0	0	0
