= Tyler Laubscher =

New Zealand rugby union player

- Born: 18 December 2000 (age 25) Cape Town, Western Cape, South Africa
- Height: 190 cm (6 ft 3 in)
- Weight: 103 kg (227 lb; 16 st 3 lb)
- School: Palmerston North Boys' High School

Rugby union career
- Position: Flanker
- Current team: Manawatu, Hurricanes
Senior career
Years	Team	Apps	(Points)
2019–	Manawatu	9	(5)
2022–	Hurricanes	1	(0)
- Correct as of 2 December 2024

Tyler Laubscher (born 18 December 2000) is a New Zealand rugby union player who plays for the Hurricanes in Super Rugby. His playing position is flanker. He was named in the Hurricanes squad for the 2022 Super Rugby Pacific season. He was also a member of the Manawatu 2021 Bunnings NPC squad.

Born in Cape Town, South Africa, Laubscher moved to New Zealand with his family in about 2010. They initially lived on Auckland's North Shore, before settling in Palmerston North. Laubscher was educated at Palmerston North Boys' High School, where he co-captained the school's 1st XV rugby team in 2018.
