= Mitch Jacobson (rugby union) =

New Zealand rugby union player

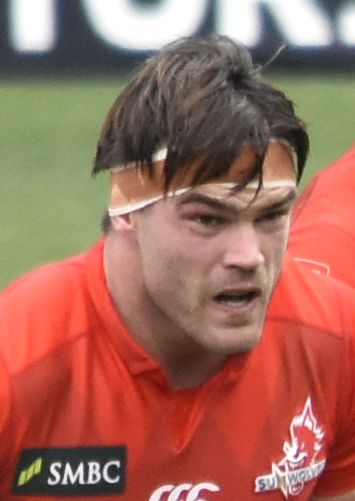
- Full name: Mitchell Lee Jacobson
- Born: 13 January 1996 (age 30) Te Awamutu, New Zealand
- Height: 1.88 m (6 ft 2 in)
- Weight: 105 kg (16 st 7 lb; 231 lb)
- School: Cambridge High School
- University: University of Waikato
- Notable relative: Luke Jacobson

Rugby union career
- Position: Loose forward
- Current team: New England Freejacks
Senior career
| Years | Team | Apps | (Points) |
| 2015− | Waikato | 71 | (30) |
| 2019– | Chiefs | 2 | (0) |
| 2020 | Sunwolves | 5 | (0) |
| 2022–2024 | New England Free Jacks | 22 | (17) |
- Correct as of 16 April 2023
International career
| Years | Team | Apps | (Points) |
| 2014 | New Zealand Schools | 5 | |
| 2015 | New Zealand U20 | 17 | |
- Correct as of 6 October 2015

Mitch Jacobson (born 13 January 1996) is a New Zealand rugby union player who currently plays as a loose forward for Waikato in the ITM Cup. He also plays for the New England Free Jacks of Major League Rugby (MLR) in the U.S.

Jacobson was a New Zealand Schools representative in 2014 and a year later he was a member of the New Zealand side which won the 2015 IRB Junior World Championship in Italy.

Jacbson has spent a majority of his career with Waikato captaining the club regularly.

== Super Rugby Career ==
In 2019 Jacobson was selected as an injury replacement for the Chiefs and played 2 games. He was not retained for the following season however was picked for the Sunwolves in 2020 for their last year in Super Rugby.

== Major league Rugby career ==
Jacobson would sign with the free jacks in 2022. He would appear in 15 games helping them win their first championship in 2023 scoring the opening try in the championship game. He would be named to the all MLR second team at the end of the season. He would be part another championship team the following year. After the 2024 season he stepped away from the team to focus on family.

== Honours ==
New England Free Jacks

- Major League Rugby Championship: (2023, 2024)
- All Major League Rugby second team: (2023)

Waikato

- Bunnings NPC Premiership Division championship (2021)

New Zealand U20s

- 2015 IRB Junior World Championship
