= Josh Timu =

New Zealand rugby union player

- Born: 6 July 1997 (age 29)
- Height: 183 cm (6 ft 0 in)
- Weight: 94 kg (207 lb; 14 st 11 lb)
- School: John McGlashan College
- University: University of Otago
- Notable relative: John Timu (father)

Rugby union career
- Position(s): Centre, Wing
- Current team: Otago, Highlanders
Senior career
Years	Team	Apps	(Points)
2017–	Otago	27	(35)
2019	Sunwolves	8	(0)
2022–	Highlanders	5	(0)
- Correct as of 22 October 2022

Josh Timu (ジョシュ ティム, Joshu Timu) is a New Zealand rugby union player who plays as a fullback. He currently plays for Highlanders in Super Rugby.

== Playing career ==
Timu has played for Otago provincial team from 2017, and the Otago highlanders Super Rugby team since 2022. He also played 8 games for the Japanese based Sunwolves Super Rugby team in 2019.
