= Sean Withy =

New Zealand rugby union player (born 2001)

- Born: 1 February 2001 (age 25) New Zealand
- Height: 191 cm (6 ft 3 in)
- Weight: 108 kg (17 st 0 lb; 238 lb)
- School: Southland Boys' High School
- University: University of Otago

Rugby union career
- Position: Flanker
- Current team: Southland, Highlanders
Senior career
Years	Team	Apps	(Points)
2020–	Otago	7	(5)
2022–	Highlanders	41	(15)
- Correct as of 5 June 2022
International career
Years	Team	Apps	(Points)
2021	New Zealand U20	4	(0)
- Correct as of 5 June 2022

Sean Withy (born 1 February 2001) is a New Zealand rugby union player who plays for the Highlanders in Super Rugby and Southland in the National Provincial Championship (NPC). His playing position is flanker.

== Early life ==
Withy attended Southland Boys' High School where he was the captain from 2017 to 2018. He was noted for his "work rate, accuracy and defensive work". In 2019 he moved to Dunedin to study at the University of Otago. He played club rugby for Otago University RFC.

== Rugby career ==
In 2021 he captained the Highlanders U20 team at the inaugural Super Rugby Aotearoa U20 tournament. He was named player of the tournament. He was also a member of the New Zealand U20 team that undertook an internal domestic tour in June and July after a trans-Tasman tour was cancelled due to the COVID-19 pandemic.

Withy made his debut for Otago in the 2020 Mitre 10 Cup season, scoring one try that season in a match against Wellington.

In September 2021, he was signed by the Highlanders ahead of the 2022 Super Rugby season.
