= Lisati Milo-Harris =

New Zealand rugby union player

- Born: 5 October 1996 (age 30) Auckland, New Zealand
- Height: 182 cm (6 ft 0 in)
- Weight: 90 kg (198 lb; 14 st 2 lb)
- School: St. Peter's College

Rugby union career
- Position: Halfback
- Current team: Northland
Senior career
Years	Team	Apps	(Points)
2017	Auckland	6	(0)
2019–2020	Taranaki	18	(0)
2020	Chiefs	5	(0)
2021	Southland	8	(0)
2022	Blues	1	(0)
2022–	Northland	31	(22)
- Correct as of 4 October 2024

Lisati M. Milo-Harris (born 5 October 1996) is a New Zealand rugby union player who plays for Northland in the Bunnings NPC. His position is halfback. He played for the Chiefs in 2020 and the Blues in 2022.
