= Logan Henry =

New Zealand rugby union player

- Born: 2 September 1996 (age 30) Wellington, New Zealand
- Height: 171 cm (5 ft 7 in)
- Weight: 84 kg (185 lb; 13 st 3 lb)
- School: Hutt International Boys' School

Rugby union career
- Position: Half-back
- Current team: Manawatu
Senior career
Years	Team	Apps	(Points)
2020	Wanganui	1	(0)
2021–2022	Manawatu	19	(25)
2022	Hurricanes	1	(5)
- Correct as of 16 July 2023

Logan Henry is a New Zealand rugby union player who plays for the Hurricanes in Super Rugby. His playing position is halfback. He was named in the Hurricanes squad for Round 3 of the 2022 Super Rugby Pacific season. He was also a member of the Manawatu 2021 Bunnings NPC squad.
