= Ricky Jackson (rugby union) =

New Zealand rugby union player

- Born: 2 August 1998 (age 28) New Zealand
- Height: 180 cm (5 ft 11 in)
- Weight: 100 kg (220 lb; 15 st 10 lb)

Rugby union career
- Position: Hooker
Senior career
Years	Team	Apps	(Points)
2017–	Otago	22	(5)
- Correct as of 12 November 2021
Super Rugby
Years	Team	Apps	(Points)
2019–	Highlanders	1	(0)
- Correct as of 12 November 2021

Ricky Daniel Jackson (born 2 August 1998) is a New Zealand rugby union player who plays for Otago in the National Provincial Championship (NPC) and the Highlanders in Super Rugby. His playing position is hooker. He was named in the Highlanders squad for week 3 in 2019. In 2020 he was named as a full squad member but before the season started he suffered an ankle injury that ended his season.

== Rugby career ==
Jackson made his debut for Otago in a 27–24 away loss to Wellington on 1 October 2017 and has continued to play for Otago since. He scored his first try for Otago in a 30–7 home win against Northland on 23 October 2020.
