= James Blackwell (rugby union) =

- Born: 1 April 1995 (age 31) Wellington, New Zealand
- Height: 191 cm (6 ft 3 in)
- Weight: 113 kg (249 lb; 17 st 11 lb)
- School: Wellington College

Rugby union career
- Position(s): Lock, Flanker
Senior career
Years	Team	Apps	(Points)
2023–2025	Kintetsu Liners	20	(0)
- Correct as of 5 June 2022
Provincial / State sides
Years	Team	Apps	(Points)
2015–2023	Wellington	61	(35)
Super Rugby
Years	Team	Apps	(Points)
2017–2023	Hurricanes	58	(15)
International career
Years	Team	Apps	(Points)
2015	New Zealand U20	4	(0)
- Correct as of 5 June 2022

James Blackwell (born 1 April 1995) is a New Zealand rugby union player who plays for the Hurricanes in the Super Rugby competition. His position of choice is lock.

== Early life and career ==
Blackwell was born in Wellington. He was head boy at Wellington College in 2012 and also captained their First XV rugby team. He is a former New Zealand under-20 representative. He completed a commerce degree at Victoria University in Wellington.

== Rugby career ==
Blackwell made his Super Rugby debut for the Hurricanes against the Sunwolves in 2017. In 2020, he re-signed with the Hurricanes until the end of 2023.
