= Soane Vikena =

New Zealand rugby union player

- Born: 1 July 2001 (age 25) Lautoka, Fiji
- Height: 183 cm (6 ft 0 in)
- Weight: 112 kg (247 lb; 17 st 9 lb)

Rugby union career
- Position: Hooker
- Current team: Auckland, Urayasu D-Rocks
Senior career
Years	Team	Apps	(Points)
2020–	Auckland	46	(25)
2021–2024	Blues	27	(10)
2025–2026	Highlanders	18	(5)
2026–	Urayasu D-Rocks		
- Correct as of 19 April 2026

Soane Vikena (born 1 July 2001 in New Zealand) is a New Zealand rugby union player who plays for the Blues in Super Rugby. His playing position is hooker. He was named in the Blues squad for the 2021 Super Rugby Aotearoa season. He was also a member of the Auckland 2020 Mitre 10 Cup squad.
