= Liam Hallam-Eames =

New Zealand rugby union player (born 1995)

- Born: 20 August 1995 (age 31) New Zealand
- Height: 199 cm (6 ft 6 in)
- Weight: 115 kg (254 lb; 18 st 2 lb)

Rugby union career
- Position: Lock
- Current team: Northland
Senior career
Years	Team	Apps	(Points)
2016–2018	Manawatu	15	(0)
2019–2020	Jersey Reds	11	(0)
2020	Auckland	6	(0)
2021–	Northland	43	(5)
2022	Crusaders	1	(0)
2023	New Orleans Gold	11	(0)
- Correct as of 4 October 2024

Liam J. Hallam-Eames (born 20 August 1995) is a New Zealand rugby union player. His position is lock. He was named as a late inclusion in the Crusaders squad for Round 12 of the 2022 Super Rugby Pacific season. He made his Super Rugby debut in the same match. He was also a member of the Northland 2021 Bunnings NPC squad and has played for the side since.
