= Josh Moorby =

New Zealand rugby union player

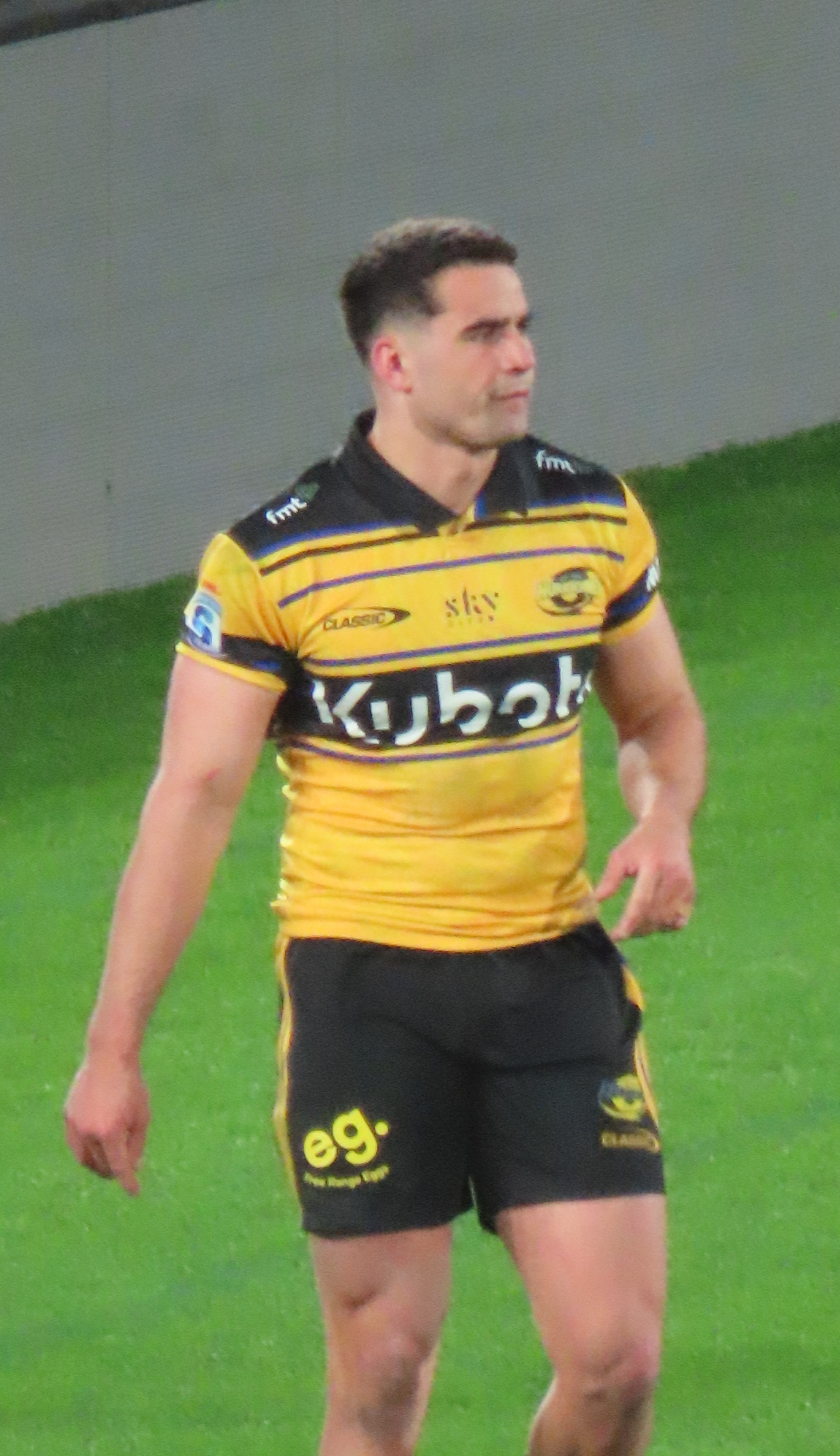
- Moorby playing for the Hurricanes in the 2026 Super Rugby Pacific final
- Full name: Joshua Moorby
- Born: 11 July 1998 (age 28) Te Awamutu, New Zealand
- Height: 188 cm (6 ft 2 in)
- Weight: 99 kg (218 lb; 15 st 8 lb)
- School: Hamilton Boys' High School

Rugby union career
- Position(s): Wing, Fullback
- Current team: Hurricanes
Senior career
Years	Team	Apps	(Points)
2019–2021	Southland	21	(30)
2022–2024, 2026–	Hurricanes	54	(190)
2022–2023	Northland	16	(30)
2024–	Waikato	13	(20)
2024	Montpellier	15	(10)
- Correct as of 1 July 2026
International career
Years	Team	Apps	(Points)
2022–2024	Māori All Blacks	3	(0)
2026 -	New Zealand	10	(15)
- Correct as of 21 November 2026

Joshua M. Moorby (born 11 July 1998) is a New Zealand rugby union player who plays on the wing or fullback. He was announced in the Highlanders squad as an injury replacement in April 2021 for the 2021 Super Rugby Aotearoa season. He also represented Southland.

== Club career ==
In 2026, Moorby formed part of the Hurricanes squad which won the 2026 Super Rugby Pacific season. On 20 June, the Hurricanes defeated the Chiefs 60–5 in the final. Moorby scored two of the Hurricanes' nine tries.

== Personal life ==
Moorby is a New Zealander of Māori descent (Ngāti Maniapoto descent).
