= Billy Harmon =

NZ rugby union player

- Full name: William Harmon
- Born: 23 December 1994 (age 31) Christchurch, New Zealand
- Height: 187 cm (6 ft 2 in)
- Weight: 104 kg (229 lb; 16 st 5 lb)
- School: St. Bede's College

Rugby union career
- Position(s): Flanker, Number 8
- Current team: Canon Eagles
Senior career
Years	Team	Apps	(Points)
2016–2024	Canterbury	60	(50)
2018–2020	Crusaders	12	(5)
2021–2024	Highlanders	23	(20)
2024–	Canon Eagles	33	(35)
- Correct as of 1 March 2023
International career
Years	Team	Apps	(Points)
2018–2022	Māori All Blacks	8	(0)
- Correct as of 1 March 2023

William Harmon (born 23 December 1994) is a New Zealand rugby union player who currently plays as a flanker for Canterbury in New Zealand's domestic Mitre 10 Cup and the Highlanders in Super Rugby.

== Early career ==
Harmon played for New Brighton before High School. Harmon attended St Bede's College in Christchurch and during that time, he was selected as a member of the New Zealand Schools Barbarians squad for their matches against Australia and Samoa in 2012.

After leaving school, Harmon played for New Brighton again in club rugby while working full-time as a plumber. He was in excellent form during the 2016 club rugby season, captaining New Brighton to the final of the Hawkins Division 1 Trophy. Unfortunately, the season didn't end well for him as he was red carded as his side went down to Lincoln University.

His impressive club form didn't go unnoticed and through 2015 and 2016 he spent time with the Crusaders Academy and turned out for Canterbury's Colts and Maori sides.

== Senior career ==
Harmon was named in Canterbury's squad for the 2016 Mitre 10 Cup. He debuted in the first match of the season, a 43–3 victory over Auckland and went on to make 7 appearances and score 3 tries during the campaign which culminated in Canterbury lifting the Premiership title for the 8th time in 9 seasons as well as claiming the Ranfurly Shield.

At the end of 2020, Harmon signed a two-year deal to play for the Highlanders in Super Rugby.

Joining the Yokohama Canon Eagles in 2024, Harmon has been a stand out back rower in the Japan League One competition. He notably scored a try that was described as ‘creamy’ against Kobelco Steelers in their upset win in the 2025/26 season.

== Personal life ==
Harmon is a New Zealander of Māori descent (Ngāi Tahu descent).
