= Josh Bartlett =

New Zealand rugby union player

- Full name: Josh Craig Bartlett
- Born: 28 December 2002 (age 23) New Zealand
- Height: 185 cm (6 ft 1 in)
- Weight: 121 kg (267 lb)
- School: Tauranga Boys College

Rugby union career
- Position: Prop
- Current team: Bay of Plenty, Chiefs
Senior career
| Years | Team | Apps | (Points) |
| 2021– | Bay of Plenty | 35 | (10) |
| 2022 | Chiefs | 1 | (0) |
| 2024 | Western Force | 5 | (0) |
| 2025– | Highlanders | 14 | (0) |
- Correct as of 21 May 2022

Josh Bartlett is a New Zealand rugby union player who played for the Chiefs and Western Force in Super Rugby and the Bay of Plenty in the National Provincial Championship. His playing position is prop. He was named in the Chiefs squad for Round 14 of the 2022 Super Rugby Pacific season, and made his debut in the same fixture. Bartlett signed for the Western Force during the 2024 Super Rugby competition on a short-term contract. He started one game, and came off of the bench for a further four.

Bartlett was also named in the Bay of Plenty squad for the 2021 Bunnings NPC.
