= Bruce Kauika-Petersen =

NZ rugby union player

- Born: 16 April 1997 (age 29) New Zealand
- Height: 185 cm (6 ft 1 in)
- Weight: 111 kg (245 lb; 17 st 7 lb)

Rugby union career
- Position: Hooker
Senior career
Years	Team	Apps	(Points)
2020–2021	Wellington	5	(5)
2022–2023	Northland	15	(5)
- Correct as of 11 September 2023
Super Rugby
Years	Team	Apps	(Points)
2022	Hurricanes	1	(0)
- Correct as of 29 July 2022

Bruce K. Kauika-Petersen (born 16 April 1997) is a New Zealand rugby union player. His position is hooker.
