= Mosese Dawai =

Fijian rugby union player (born 1998)

- Born: 29 June 1998 (age 28) Fiji
- Height: 190 cm (6 ft 3 in)
- Weight: 101 kg (223 lb; 15 st 13 lb)
- School: Feilding High School

Rugby union career
- Position: Wing
- Current team: Waikato, Highlanders
Senior career
| Years | Team | Apps | (Points) |
| 2018–2022 | Waikato | 24 | (40) |
| 2022–2023 | Highlanders | 12 | (20) |
- Correct as of 12 April 2023

Mosese Dawai (born 29 June 1998) is a Fijian rugby union player who plays on the wing for the Highlanders in Super Rugby. He was named in the Highlanders squad for the 2022 Super Rugby Pacific season. He was also a member of the Waikato 2021 Bunnings NPC squad.
