= Teihorangi Walden =

New Zealand rugby player (born 1993)

- Full name: Teihorangi Thomas Walden
- Born: 25 May 1993 (age 33) New Plymouth, New Zealand
- Height: 185 cm (6 ft 1 in)
- Weight: 96 kg (15 st 2 lb; 212 lb)
- School: Francis Douglas Memorial College

Rugby union career
- Position: Centre
- Current team: Taranaki; Hurricanes; Rugby New York
Senior career
Years	Team	Apps	(Points)
2013−2017	Otago	49	(50)
2016−2020	Highlanders	39	(45)
2018−2024	Taranaki	49	(40)
2022−2022	Hurricanes	3	(0)
2023−2023	New York Ironworkers	16	(5)
- Correct as of 12 February 2023
International career
Years	Team	Apps	(Points)
2013	New Zealand U20	4	(0)
2017–2019	Māori All Blacks	6	(0)
- Correct as of 5 June 2022

Teihorangi Thomas Walden (born 25 May 1993) is a former New Zealand rugby union player who played as a midfield back for Taranaki in New Zealand's domestic Mitre 10 Cup and the Highlanders in the international Super Rugby competition. He also played for the Rugby New York (Ironworkers) in Major League Rugby (MLR). He announced his retirement from professional rugby in April 2024 as a result of recurring concussions throughout his career.

== Early career ==
Walden is originally from New Plymouth and was schooled at Francis Douglas Memorial College in his hometown where he played first XV rugby. During his schooldays, he was selected in the Hurricanes schools side alongside future teammate Jackson Hemopo. He moved south to Dunedin to attend university and at the same time began working his way through the Otago rugby structures; he was a member of their academy, played for their age group sides and also turned out for Southern in the local Otago rugby competition.

== Senior career ==
His first taste of senior rugby came with the Otago Razorbacks in 2013, making 5 appearances including 1 start as the men from Dunedin finished as runner up on the Championship log before being defeated by Hawke's Bay in the semi-finals. In 2014 he established himself as a regular with 9 starts and 2 tries in what was a disappointing season overall for Otago, culminating in a 6th-place finish out of 7 teams.

2015 was much more positive for both Walden and the Razorbacks with him starting 9 times and scoring 1 try and Otago finishing 3rd on the log before being comprehensively defeated by Wellington in the semi-finals. He was again in fine form during the 2016 Mitre 10 Cup scoring 2 tries in 11 games as the Razorbacks finished 1st on the championship log before surprisingly succumbing to North Harbour in the tournament final which consigned them to another season of championship rugby in 2017.

== Super Rugby ==
Some impressive performances in an under-performing Otago side brought him to the attention of Dunedin-based Super Rugby franchise, the Highlanders who named him as a member of their wider training group for the 2015 Super Rugby season. 2015 was to prove to be a memorable year for the Highlanders who lifted the Super Rugby title for the first time in their history, while for Walden, the presence of midfield backs such as Malakai Fekitoa, Richard Buckman, Jason Emery and Shaun Treeby meant he had to spend the year kicking his heels on the sidelines. His Super Rugby debut came the following year in week 1 of the competition, a 33–31 defeat away to the Blues. Overall he scored one try in 6 matches while still a wider training group member in 2016 and new Highlanders head coach, Tony Brown saw fit to promote him to the full squad for 2017.

== International career ==
Walden was a member of the New Zealand Under-20 side which finished 4th in the 2013 IRB Junior World Championship in France, although he didn't get any game time during the tournament.

== Personal life ==
Walden is a New Zealander of Māori descent (Te Atiawa descent).

== Super Rugby statistics ==
As of 10 April 2018

Season	Team	Games	Starts	Sub	Mins	Tries	Cons	Pens	Drops	Points	Yel	Red
2016	Highlanders	5	2	3	120	1	0	0	0	5	0	0
2017	Highlanders	3	0	3	29	0	0	0	0	0	0	0
2018	Highlanders	15	15	0	1077	7	0	0	0	35	0	0
Total		23	17	6	1126	8	0	0	0	40	0	0
