= Bryn Evans (rugby union, born 1984) =

New Zealand rugby union player

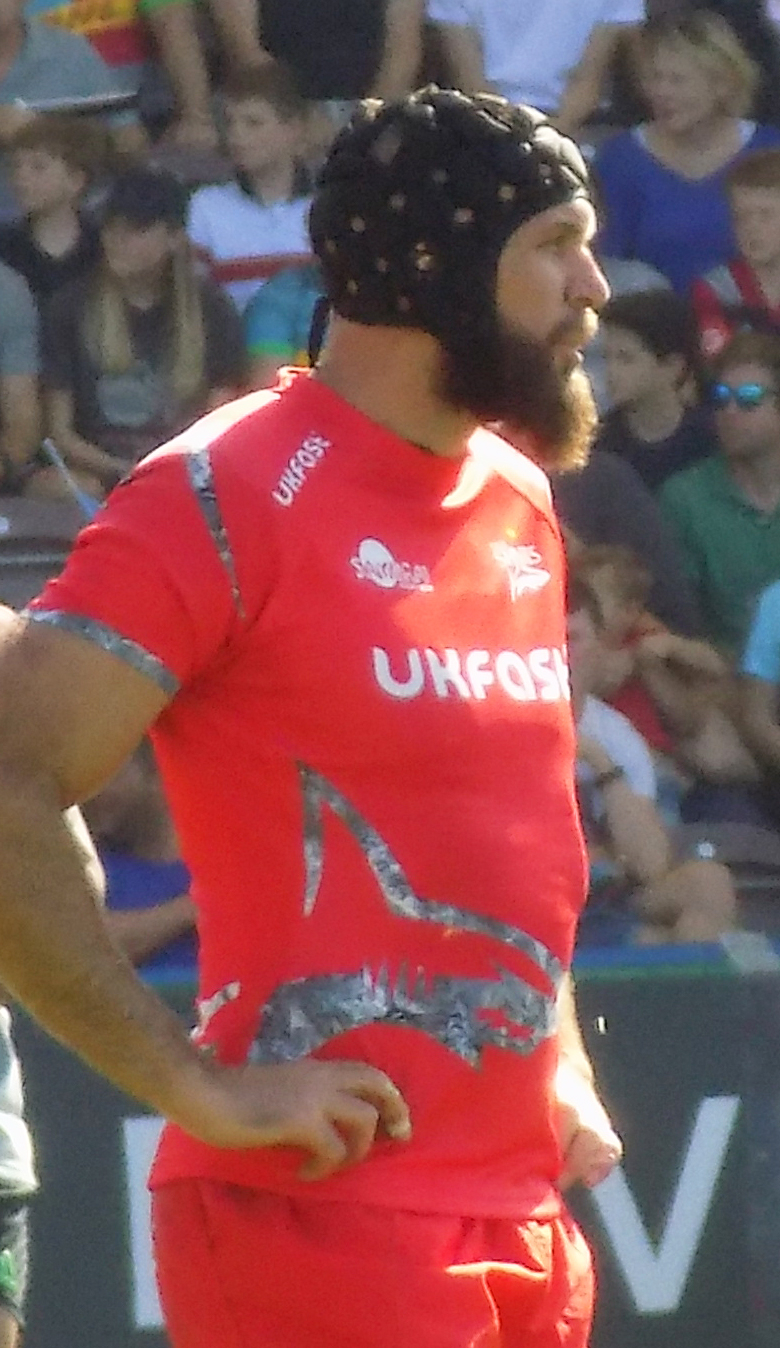
- Full name: Bryn Robert Evans
- Born: 28 October 1984 (age 42) Hastings, New Zealand
- Height: 196 cm (6 ft 5 in)
- Weight: 113 kg (17 st 11 lb; 249 lb)
- School: Napier Boys' High School
- Notable relative: Gareth Evans (brother)

Rugby union career
- Position: Lock
Senior career
Years	Team	Apps	(Points)
2003−2011, 2020−2022	Hawke's Bay	95	(55)
2008	Blues	3	(0)
2009−2011	Hurricanes	25	(0)
2011−2014	London Irish	74	(25)
2014−2015	Biarritz Olympique	20	(5)
2015−2020	Sale Sharks	122	(70)
2021−2022	Highlanders	24	(5)
- Correct as of 9 October 2022
International career
Years	Team	Apps	(Points)
2009	New Zealand	2	(0)
- Correct as of 5 June 2022
Coaching career
- Years: Team
- 2023–2024: Hawke's Bay (assistant)
- 2024–: Hurricanes (assistant)
- 2025–: New Zealand (assistant)

Bryn Evans (born 28 October 1984) is a retired New Zealand rugby union player, who most recently played as a lock for the Highlanders in Super Rugby and Hawke's Bay in New Zealand's National Provincial Championship competition.

== Club career ==
Evans was born in Hastings and attended high school in Napier. He was accepted into the New Zealand Secondary Schools team in 2002 and played for the New Zealand Divisional XV in 2005. The following year, he made his provincial debut for Hawke's Bay in the Air New Zealand Cup.

In 2008, Evans signed with the Blues in the Super 14. For the 2009 season, he switched to the Wellington-based Hurricanes.

Evans joined English club London Irish in 2011 on a two-year contract. The All Black second row was one of numerous international players to join the club in 2011. On 10 June 2014, Evans joined French club Biarritz Olympique in the Pro D2 league.

On 21 May 2015, Evans returned to England to sign for Sale Sharks on a two-year contract. He left Sale at the end of his contract on 30 June 2020. On January 3, 2020, he was named in the English Premiership team of the decade, following successful spells at London Irish and Sale.

Following his stint in England and France, Evans returned to New Zealand, with plans of becoming a winemaker at a winery in Hawke's Bay that had recently been purchased by the Evans family. Evans returned to play for Hawke's Bay from 2020, nine years after last playing for the side, in the reformed National Provincial Championship and subsequently signed to play for the Highlanders for the 2021 and 2022 Super Rugby seasons. Evans retired from professional rugby after the 2022 National Provincial Championship season.

== International career ==
Evans earned his first start for the All Blacks in 2009, making his debut against France in June. He played two tests against France, before a back injury forced him to pull out for the rest of the international mid-year season, as well as the 2009 Air New Zealand Cup.

== Coaching career ==
Upon retiring from professional rugby following his 2022 seasons with the Highlanders and Hawke's Bay, Evans opened an eatery with his wife in Havelock North, called Brother. At the same time, Evans took up a coaching position for the Hawke's Bay Magpies, serving as their forwards coach from the 2023 season onwards. They closed the cafe when Evans was offered an assistant coaching role with the Hurricanes in Wellington, starting from the 2024 Super Rugby season, focusing on lineout and kickoff coaching.

Evans was announced as an assistant coach to Scott Robertson's All Blacks for the 2025 international season, joining the coaching group as a specialist lineout coach. The appointment would see him step down from his coaching position at Hawke's Bay, however, he is due to rejoin the Hurricanes for the 2026 Super Rugby Pacific season at the conclusion of his commitments to the national side.
