= George Bower (rugby union) =

New Zealand Rugby Union player

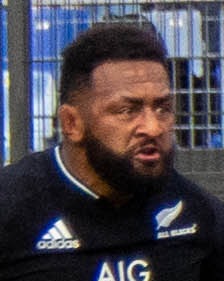
- Full name: George Gadai Bower
- Born: 28 May 1992 (age 34) Wellington, New Zealand
- Height: 183 cm (6 ft 0 in)
- Weight: 115 kg (254 lb; 18 st 2 lb)
- School: Taita College

Rugby union career
- Position: Prop
- Current team: Otago, Crusaders
Senior career
Years	Team	Apps	(Points)
2014–	Otago	30	(0)
2019–	Crusaders	100	(5)
- Correct as of 15 May 2026
International career
Years	Team	Apps	(Points)
2020	South Island	1	(0)
2021–	New Zealand	34	(5)
- Correct as of 21 November 2025

George Gadai Bower (born 28 May 1992) is a New Zealand rugby union player. He began his rugby in Wellington playing for Avalon rugby club, following that he made his first ever representative team playing for Wellington U20s in 2011. His position is prop. He currently plays for the Crusaders in Super Rugby and Otago in the Bunnings NPC.

== Rugby career ==
In 2014, Bower moved to Dunedin to play for the Harbour Hawks RFC and then played one game for Otago's National Provincial Championship team that year as an injury replacement. Bower was once an extra in an advertisement for the All Blacks.

Bower did not make an appearance for Otago until 2018 when he was called in as injury cover. He played seven more games for Otago in 2018.

In 2019, he was named in the Crusaders' pre-season and made his debut in round 4. In November 2019, he was named in the 2020 Crusaders' squad.

In October 2020, the All Blacks' coach, Ian Foster, named Bower as a wider squad member of the All Blacks team to Australia. In 2021, he was again named in the wider squad for the Steinlager Series against Fiji and Tonga. He made his international debut for the All Blacks on 3 July 2021 against Tonga in Auckland.
