= Fletcher Newell =

New Zealand rugby union player

- Born: 1 March 2000 (age 26) Rangiora, New Zealand
- Height: 1.86 m (6 ft 1 in)
- Weight: 121 kg (267 lb; 19 st 1 lb)
- School: Rangiora High School
- University: Lincoln University

Rugby union career
- Position: Tighthead Prop
- Current team: Canterbury, Crusaders
Senior career
Years	Team	Apps	(Points)
2020–	Canterbury	18	(0)
2021–	Crusaders	59	(15)
- Correct as of 17 October 2026
International career
Years	Team	Apps	(Points)
2019	New Zealand U20	5	(0)
2022–	New Zealand	46	(10)
- Correct as of 21 November 2026

Fletcher Newell (born 1 March 2000 in New Zealand) is a New Zealand rugby union player who plays as a Prop for the Crusaders in Super Rugby and Canterbury in the National Provincial Championship.

== Biography ==
Newell was educated at Rangiora High School.

In 2019, Newell represented New Zealand at the Under 20 Championship in Argentina and was also named New Zealand's Rugby Age Grade Player of the Year. He was a member of the Canterbury 2020 Mitre 10 Cup squad.

Newell was named in the Crusaders squad and made his debut in the 2021 Super Rugby Aotearoa season.

Newell made his international debut for New Zealand on 13 August 2022 against South Africa at Johannesburg.
