= Josh Goodhue =

NZ rugby union player (born 1995)

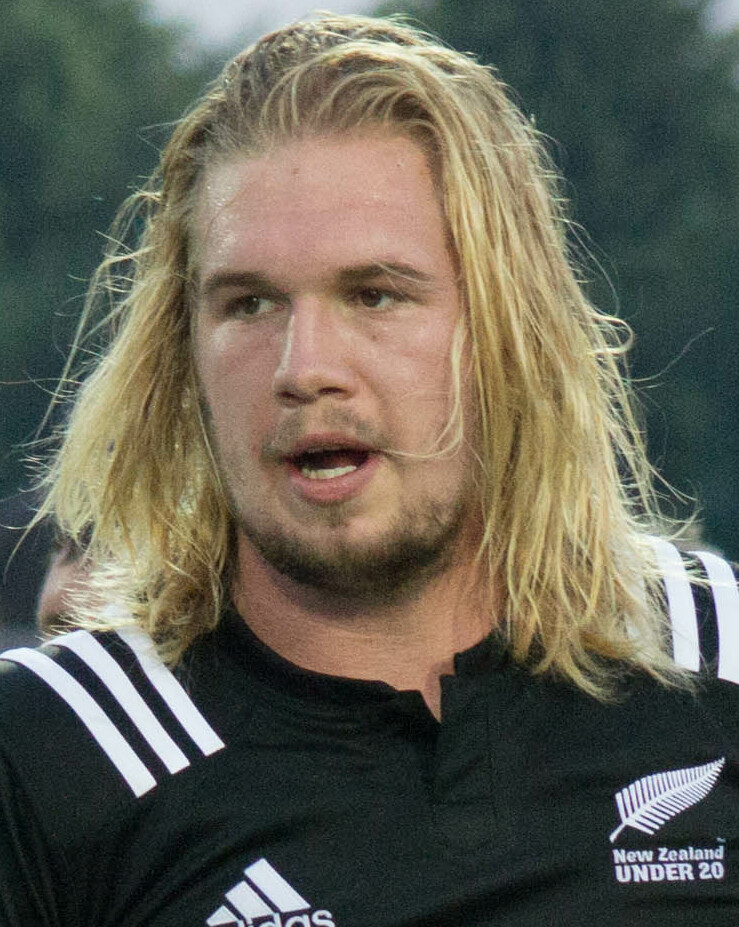
- Born: 13 June 1995 (age 31) New Zealand
- Height: 199 cm (6 ft 6 in)
- Weight: 115 kg (254 lb; 18 st 2 lb)
- School: Mount Albert Grammar School
- University: Lincoln University
- Notable relative(s): Cameron Goodhue (brother); Jack Goodhue (brother)

Rugby union career
- Position: Lock
- Current team: Ricoh Black Rams
Senior career
Years	Team	Apps	(Points)
2015–2022, 2026-	Northland	64	(30)
2017–2022	Blues	48	(0)
2022–	Ricoh Black Rams	39	(10)
- Correct as of 13 August 2023
International career
Years	Team	Apps	(Points)
2015	New Zealand U20	7	(0)
2017	New Zealand Barbarians	1	(0)
- Correct as of 13 August 2023

Joshua K. Goodhue (born 13 June 1995) is a New Zealand rugby union player.

== Early career ==
Goodhue was raised on a farm in the Northland Region of New Zealand along with older brother Cameron and twin brother Jack, who would both also go on to become professional rugby union players. He attended Mount Albert Grammar School in Auckland where he captained their top side to 17 victories in 20 games during the 2013 season.

After finishing school, he took a short break to visit brother Cameron who was playing for Worcester Warriors in England at the time. He played some rugby in England before returning to his homeland to turn out for Kawakawa in the local Northland club competition. During this time, he also captained his province at Under 19 level. He later joined twin brother, Jack, in studying at Lincoln University.

== Senior career ==
Goodhue earned his first provincial cap for Northland in 2015 and appeared 7 times in total during what was a season to forget for the men from the far north as they finished bottom of the ITM Cup Championship standings with no wins in 10 games. He scored 3 tries in 6 games the following year in which the Taniwha improved, even if their results didn't, winning just 1 of 10 regular season games. In Round 4 of the 2021 Bunnings NPC Goodhue played his 50th game for the Taniwha against Manawatu in Palmerston North.

== Super Rugby ==
Impressive displays in tough circumstances for Northland saw Goodhue handed a Super Rugby contract by the Auckland based Blues ahead of the 2017 Super Rugby season. He made his debut on 15 April 2017, coming off the bench against the Hurricanes.

== International ==
Goodhue represented New Zealand at schoolboy level and was a member of the New Zealand Under-20 side which won the 2015 World Rugby Under 20 Championship in Italy.

== Career Honours ==
New Zealand Under 20

- World Rugby Under 20 Championship - 2015

Blues

- Super Rugby Trans-Tasman
