= Vaiolini Ekuasi =

New Zealand rugby union player (born 2001)

- Born: 11 October 2001 (age 25) Auckland, New Zealand
- Height: 1.81 m (5 ft 11 in)
- Weight: 107 kg (236 lb; 16 st 12 lb)
- School: St Peter's School

Rugby union career
- Position(s): Flanker, Number 8
- Current team: Western Force
Senior career
Years	Team	Apps	(Points)
2021–2024	Auckland	22	(20)
2022	Blues	1	(0)
2023–2024	Melbourne Rebels	27	(20)
2025–	Western Force	6	(0)
- Correct as of 4 February 2026

Vaiolini Ekuasi (born 11 October 2001) is a New Zealand professional rugby union player who plays as a flanker for Super Rugby club Western Force.

== Early life ==
Ekuasi captained St Peter's School, before being selected for the Chiefs under-18s and the New Zealand Schools in 2019. He continued his rise in 2021, representing the Blues at the Super Rugby Aotearoa under-20 tournament in Taupō, earning national age-group honours and making his National Provincial Championship debut for Auckland.

== Club career ==
The Western Force confirmed the signing of Ekuasi ahead of the 2025 Super Rugby Pacific season. He arrived from the Melbourne Rebels, where he spent the previous two seasons after making his Super Rugby debut with the Blues in 2022. Ekuasi made twenty seven appearances for the Rebels, scoring four tries, including one against the Force during the 2023 campaign.
