= Scott Gregory (rugby union) =

New Zealand rugby union player

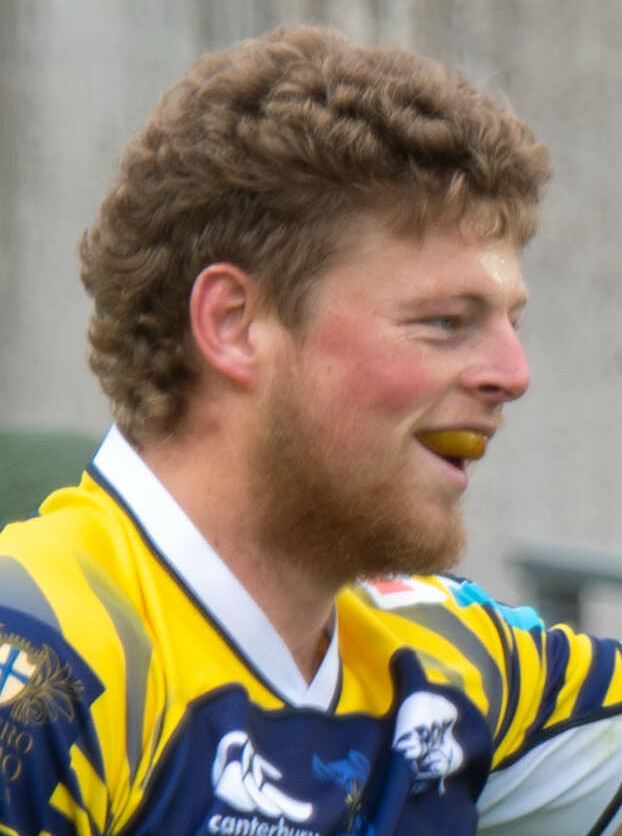
- Born: 7 January 1999 (age 27) Whangārei, New Zealand
- Height: 185 cm (6 ft 1 in)
- Weight: 95 kg (209 lb; 14 st 13 lb)
- School: Whangārei Boys' High School

Rugby union career
- Position(s): Centre, Wing, Fullback
- Current team: Zebre Parma
Senior career
Years	Team	Apps	(Points)
2018–2021	Northland	36	(45)
2020–2023	Highlanders	34	(40)
2022–2023	Southland	13	(10)
2023–2025	Zebre Parma	32	(25)
2025–	Southland		
- Correct as of 4 August 2024
International career
Years	Team	Apps	(Points)
2018–2019	New Zealand U20	11	(25)
- Correct as of 4 August 2024
National sevens team
Years	Team		Comps
2019–2020	New Zealand		7
- Correct as of 4 August 2024

Scott Gregory (born 7 January 1999) is a New Zealand rugby union player who plays for Southland in the National Provincial Championship.

== Career ==
Gregory was sighted at an early age, securing a three-year deal with Northland for the 2017 Mitre 10 Cup at the age of 18. Gregory had a breakthrough year in 2018 which started with the Whangārei teen being selected and playing in all five of the New Zealand national under-20 rugby union team's matches at the World Rugby Under 20 Championship. Gregory then returned to New Zealand and played a starring role in the Northland campaign, debuting off the bench in the first round and going on to play 10 matches. The young Northland star was later selected as a member of the New Zealand national rugby sevens team in the 2019 season, playing in several tournaments throughout the year and even debuting on the World Rugby Sevens Series in a championship win in Dubai. From 2020 to 2023, he was named in the Highlanders squad. He played also for Southland in the Bunnings NPC.

Gregory signed for Zebre Parma in June 2023 ahead of the 2023–24 United Rugby Championship. He made his debut in Round 1 of the 2023–24 season against the Ulster. He played with Zebre Parma until 2025.

In July 2025 he concluded his period playing for Zebre Parma and returned to his previous team, Southland.
