= Finlay Brewis =

New Zealand rugby union player

- Born: 10 February 2000 (age 26) Christchurch, New Zealand
- Height: 186 cm (6 ft 1 in)
- Weight: 121 kg (267 lb; 19 st 1 lb)
- School: Westlake Boys High School

Rugby union career
- Position: Prop
- Current team: Canterbury, Crusaders
Senior career
| Years | Team | Apps | (Points) |
| 2020– | Canterbury | 24 | (5) |
| 2022– | Crusaders | 6 | (0) |
| 2022 | Randwick | 1 | (0) |
- Correct as of 5 November 2022
International career
| Years | Team | Apps | (Points) |
| 2022 | All Blacks XV | 1 | (0) |
- Correct as of 5 November 2022

Finlay Brewis (born 10 February 2000 in New Zealand) is a New Zealand rugby union player who plays for Canterbury. His playing position is prop.
