= Sam Fischli =

New Zealand rugby union player

- Born: Samuel Fischli; 2 April 1998 (age 28) New Zealand
- Height: 188 cm (6 ft 2 in)
- Weight: 103 kg (16 st 3 lb; 227 lb)
- School: Tokomairiro High School

Rugby union career
- Position: Flanker
- Current team: Otago; New England Free Jacks
Senior career
Years	Team	Apps	(Points)
2020–	Otago	12	(0)
2023	New England Free Jacks		
- Correct as of 22 June 2023

Samuel Fischli (born 2 April 1998) is a New Zealand rugby union player who players for Otago in the National Provincial Championship (NPC). He also plays for the New England Free Jacks in Major League Rugby (MLR) in the U.S. His playing position is flanker.

== Early life ==
Fischli attended Tokomairiro High School in Milton, New Zealand.

== Rugby career ==
Fischli initially played for Milton's Toko RFC before moving to Dunedin. He played his Dunedin club career for Taieri RFC. On 30 October 2020 Fischli made his debut for Otago in a 23–16 loss against Canterbury. Including the debut, Fischli made two appearances for Otago during the 2020 Mitre 10 Cup season.

In 2021 Fischli continued playing for Otago.
