= Cameron Suafoa =

NZ rugby union player (born 1998)

- Full name: Cameron Suafoa
- Born: 23 April 1998 (age 28) Auckland, New Zealand
- Height: 196 cm (6 ft 5 in)
- Weight: 116 kg (256 lb; 18 st 4 lb)
- School: St. Peter's College

Rugby union career
- Position(s): Lock, Flanker
- Current team: North Harbour, Blues
Senior career
Years	Team	Apps	(Points)
2019	Auckland	1	(0)
2020	Tasman	1	(0)
2021–	North Harbour	32	(20)
2022–	Blues	31	(20)
- Correct as of 22 January 2025
International career
Years	Team	Apps	(Points)
2022	Māori All Blacks	1	(0)
- Correct as of 22 October 2022

Cameron Suafoa (born 23 April 1998) is a New Zealand rugby union player who plays for North Harbour in the National Provincial Championship. His playing position is flanker. He is currently contracted to the Blues Super Rugby Franchise and made his debut on 29th March 2022 at Mount Smart Stadium. Cameron was named in the 2022 Māori All Black’s squad to play a 2-test series against Ireland. He made his debut for the Māori All Blacks on June 29 at FMG stadium in Hamilton.

On 15 April 2024, he announced that he would be taking a break from the sport in order to complete radiation treatment for cancer.

Suafoa returned from illness in the 2024 Bunnings NPC season and was named as captain for North Harbour that season. After becoming a regular starter for the Blues in 2025, Suafoa subsequently missed the entire 2025 Bunnings NPC, following a second cancer diagnosis.

== Personal life ==
Suafoa is a New Zealander of Māori descent (Ngāpuhi) and Samoan descent. Since his first cancer diagnosis, Suafoa has been an ambassador of the New Zealand Sarcoma Foundation.
