= Sam Caird =

New Zealand rugby union player

- Born: Sam Caird; 18 March 1997 (age 29) Hamilton, New Zealand
- Height: 203 cm (6 ft 8 in)
- Weight: 120 kg (260 lb; 18 st 13 lb)
- School: St. Peter's School

Rugby union career
- Position: Lock
- Current team: Northland
Senior career
| Years | Team | Apps | (Points) |
| 2016–2018 | Waikato | 10 | (0) |
| 2019– | Northland | 51 | (10) |
| 2021 | Waratahs | 14 | (0) |
| 2021 | Sydney University | 1 | (0) |
| 2022 | Highlanders | 5 | (0) |
| 2022–2023 | Kintetsu Liners | 3 | (0) |
| 2025–2026 | Canon Eagles | 2 | (0) |
- Correct as of 4 October 2024
International career
| Years | Team | Apps | (Points) |
| 2016–2017 | New Zealand U20 | 8 | (0) |
- Correct as of 4 October 2024

Sam Caird (born 18 March 1997) is a New Zealand rugby union player who plays for Northland in the Bunnings NPC. His position is lock. He was part of the Blues squad in 2020 but did not play.
