= Luca Inch =

New Zealand rugby union player

- Born: 29 August 2001 (age 25) Motueka, New Zealand
- Height: 182 cm (6 ft 0 in)
- Weight: 118 kg (260 lb; 18 st 8 lb)
- School: Nelson College

Rugby union career
- Position: Prop
Senior career
| Years | Team | Apps | (Points) |
| 2021–2023 | Tasman | 21 | (0) |
| 2022–2023 | Highlanders | 1 | (0) |
- Correct as of 7 October 2023
International career
| Years | Team | Apps | (Points) |
| 2021 | New Zealand U20 | 0 | (0) |
- Correct as of 7 October 2023

Luca I. Inch is a New Zealand rugby union player. His position is prop.

== Career ==
In May 2021 Inch was named in the 2021 New Zealand Under 20 squad. He was named in the Tasman Mako squad as a development player for the 2021 Bunnings NPC. Inch made his debut for Tasman in Round 3 of the competition against Northland, coming off the bench in a 29–48 win for the Mako. The side went on to make the final before losing to Waikato 23–20. He was named in the Highlanders squad as a late signing for the 2022 Super Rugby Pacific season. He made his debut for the Highlanders in Round 14 of the 2022 season against the Waratahs.

Inch was educated at Nelson College from 2015 to 2019.
