= James Arscott =

New Zealand rugby union player

- Full name: James Michael Arscott
- Born: 15 July 2000 (age 26) Timaru
- Height: 174 cm (5 ft 9 in)
- Weight: 80 kg (176 lb; 12 st 8 lb)
- School: Roncalli College, Otago Boys' High School

Rugby union career
- Position: Half-back
- Current team: Otago; Highlanders
Senior career
Years	Team	Apps	(Points)
2018–	Otago	33	(0)
2021–	Highlanders	4	(0)
- Correct as of 31 January 2024
International career
Years	Team	Apps	(Points)
2018	New Zealand Schools Barbarians	1	(0)
- Correct as of 31 January 2024

James Michael Arscott (born 15 July 2000 in New Zealand) is a New Zealand rugby union player who plays for the Highlanders in Super Rugby and for Auckland in the Bunnings NPC. His playing position is scrum-half. He was announced in the Highlanders squad as an injury replacement in April 2021 for the 2021 Super Rugby Aotearoa season. He also represented Otago in the 2020 Mitre 10 Cup.
