= Rory van Vugt =

NZ rugby union player

- Full name: Rory Franklin van Vugt
- Born: 8 October 1997 (age 29) Balclutha, New Zealand
- Height: 187 cm (6 ft 2 in)
- Weight: 92 kg (203 lb; 14 st 7 lb)
- School: South Otago High School

Rugby union career
- Position(s): Wing, Fullback
- Current team: Southland, Highlanders
Senior career
Years	Team	Apps	(Points)
2018–	Southland	25	(20)
2020–2021	Rugby ATL	16	(15)
2022	Highlanders	2	(5)
- Correct as of 29 May 2022

Rory van Vugt (born 8 October 1997) is a New Zealand rugby union player, who currently plays as a wing or fullback for the Highlanders in Super Rugby and Southland in New Zealand's domestic National Provincial Championship competition.

He previously played for Rugby ATL in Major League Rugby (MLR).

In 2019, van Vugt was named as a player to watch by allblacks.com.
