= Seb Calder =

New Zealand rugby union player

- Born: 16 March 2002 (age 24) New Zealand
- Height: 184 cm (6 ft 0 in)
- Weight: 121 kg (267 lb)

Rugby union career
- Position: Prop
- Current team: Crusaders
Senior career
Years	Team	Apps	(Points)
2022–	Crusaders	7	(0)
- Correct as of 18 May 2023

Seb Calder is a New Zealand rugby union player who plays for the Crusaders in Super Rugby. His playing position is prop. He was named as a late inclusion in the Crusaders squad for Round 12 of the 2022 Super Rugby Pacific season. He made his debut for the Crusaders in the same match. He was previously a member of the Crusaders academy.
