= Leni Apisai =

NZ rugby union player (born 1996)

- Full name: Leni Chris Anitoni Apisai
- Born: 3 August 1996 (age 30) Porirua, New Zealand
- Height: 180 cm (5 ft 11 in)
- Weight: 102 kg (225 lb; 16 st 1 lb)
- School: Wellington College

Rugby union career
- Position: Hooker
- Current team: Auckland
Senior career
Years	Team	Apps	(Points)
2014–2017	Wellington	30	(25)
2016–2017, 2022	Hurricanes	18	(15)
2018–2021	Blues	19	(0)
2019–2023	Auckland	41	(25)
2020	Sunwolves	1	(0)
2022-	Highlanders	3	(0)
- Correct as of 24 March 2023
International career
Years	Team	Apps	(Points)
2015–2016	New Zealand U20	8	(5)
2016–2022	Māori All Blacks	2	(0)
2020	Moana Pasifika	1	(0)
- Correct as of 24 March 2023

Leni Chris Anitoni Apisai (born 8 March 1996) is a New Zealand rugby union player who currently plays as a hooker for Auckland in New Zealand's domestic Mitre 10 Cup and the Highlanders in the international Super Rugby competition.

== Early career ==
Born in the town of Porirua in the greater Wellington metropolitan area, Apisai was educated at Aotea College in his hometown before later moving to Wellington College where he played first XV rugby. During his high school years, he turned out for Wellington at age group level and captained their under-16 side.

== Senior Rugby ==
Aged just 18, Apisai first played provincial rugby for Wellington during the 2014 ITM Cup, making 2 appearances including 1 start. The campaign was not a happy one for the Lions as they were relegated down to the Championship division for the 2015 season after recording just 1 win in 10 games.

Wellington were unable to gain promotion back to the Premiership at the first time of asking, finishing 2nd behind Hawke's Bay on the Championship log before being defeated 26–25 by the same opposition in the playoff final. Although the season was one of disappointment for his team, for Apisai personally, it saw him take advantage of Motu Matu'u's involvement with Samoa in the 2015 Rugby World Cup to establish himself as the Lions first choice in the number 2 jersey, playing all 12 games during the season and scoring 2 tries.

Matu'u departed for Gloucester prior to the 2016 Mitre 10 Cup leaving Apisai unchallenged as Wellington's main hooker for the year. He played 10 of their 11 games during the year and helped himself to 3 tries as they once again finished 2nd in the Championship, this time behind Otago and were then surprisingly defeated 40–37 at home by North Harbour in the playoff semi-finals with his 11th minute try scored in vain.

== Super Rugby ==
After just 2 provincial appearances for Wellington, Apisai was named as part of the Hurricanes wider training group ahead of the 2015 Super Rugby season. Unsurprisingly given his tender years and lack of top-level experience, he was unable to get on the field at any point during the year, taking the role of the franchise's fourth choice rake behind; Dane Coles, Motu Matu'u and Brayden Mitchell.

Doors began to open for him ahead of the 2016 season with Mitchell leaving after his short-term contract had expired and Coles and Matu'u both being struck down by injury in pre-season. Apisai was left temporarily as the 'Canes first choice number 2 and debuted in week 1 of the season, a 52–10 defeat away to the Brumbies. This heavy defeat was in stark contrast to what followed throughout the rest of the year as the 'Canes bounced back to lift the Super Rugby title in August with a 20–3 win over the Lions. Apisai started the first 3 games of the year and played a total of 5 matches in his first season as a member of the franchise's senior squad.

Apisai signed to the Blues for the 2018 Super Rugby season.

== International ==
Apisai was a New Zealand Schools representative in 2013 and was later captained the New Zealand Under-20 side which finished 5th in the 2016 World Rugby Under 20 Championship in England, scoring 1 try in 5 matches.

In October 2016 Apisai, who affiliates to the Ngāti Awa iwi, was named in the Māori All Blacks squad for their end-of-year tour to the Northern Hemisphere. He debuted as a 75th minute replacement for the Māori captain Ash Dixon in a 27–14 defeat by Munster on 11 November 2016.

== Career Honours ==
Hurricanes

- Super Rugby - 2016

== Super Rugby Statistics ==
As of 24 January 2017

Season	Team	Games	Starts	Sub	Mins	Tries	Cons	Pens	Drops	Points	Yel	Red
2016	Hurricanes	5	3	2	169	0	0	0	0	0	0	0
Total		5	3	2	169	0	0	0	0	0	0	0
