= Alex Fidow =

- Born: 19 August 1997 (age 29) Wellington, New Zealand
- Height: 187 cm (6 ft 2 in)
- Weight: 137 kg (302 lb; 21 st 8 lb)
- School: Scots College

Rugby union career
- Position: Prop
- Current team: Wellington, Hurricanes
Senior career
Years	Team	Apps	(Points)
2016–	Wellington	48	(95)
2018–	Hurricanes	25	(15)
- Correct as of 5 June 2022
International career
Years	Team	Apps	(Points)
2016–2017	New Zealand U20	13	(0)
- Correct as of 5 June 2022

Alex Fidow (born 19 August 1997) is a New Zealand rugby union player who plays for the Hurricanes in the Super Rugby competition. His position of choice is prop.
