= Kurt Eklund =

New Zealand rugby union player

- Born: 5 January 1992 (age 34) Auckland, New Zealand
- Height: 180 cm (5 ft 11 in)
- Weight: 103 kg (227 lb; 16 st 3 lb)
- School: Auckland Grammar School

Rugby union career
- Position: Hooker
Senior career
Years	Team	Apps	(Points)
2015–2017	Auckland	32	(20)
2019–2026	Bay of Plenty	53	(30)
2020–2026	Blues	75	(115)
2026	Canon Eagles	0	(0)
- Correct as of 8 October 2024
International career
Years	Team	Apps	(Points)
2020–2022	Māori All Blacks	7	(10)
2025	ANZAC XV	1	(0)
- Correct as of 8 October 2024

Kurt Eklund (born 5 January 1992 in New Zealand) is a New Zealand rugby union player who plays for the Blues in Super Rugby. His playing position is hooker. He has signed for the Blues squad in 2020.

== Personal life ==
Eklund is a New Zealander of Māori descent (Ngāti Kahu descent).
