= 2022 Bunnings NPC =

2022 rugby union competition in New Zealand

2022 Bunnings NPC season
- Countries: New Zealand
- Date: 5 August – 22 October
- Champions: Wellington
- Runners-up: Canterbury
- Matches played: 77
- Tries scored: 544 (average 7.1 per match)
- Top point scorer: Fergus Burke (Canterbury); 147 points
- Top try scorer: Tevita Li (North Harbour); 13 tries

Official website
- www.provincial.rugby

The 2022 Bunnings NPC was the 17th season of New Zealand's provincial rugby union competition, the National Provincial Championship, since it turned professional in 2006. It involved the top 14 provincial rugby unions of New Zealand, which – under a new format introduced in 2022 – all played for the same title for the first time since the 2010 season. For sponsorship reasons, the competition was known as the Bunnings NPC. The regular season began on 5 August 2022, when Manawatu hosted Canterbury. The final took place on 22 October 2022.

== Format ==
In 2022, a new competition format was introduced. In this new format, the 14 provincial unions participating in the Bunnings NPC are no longer competing in two separate divisions – a Premiership and a Championship division – that play for their own title. Instead, the 14 teams are playing for one NPC title and are seeded in two equal conferences: an "Odds Conference" and an "Evens Conference". The seeding is determined by the ranking on the competition table of the previous season, with the 1st, 3rd, 5th, 7th, 9th, 11th and 13th ranked teams forming the Odds Conference and the provinces finishing 2nd, 4th, 6th, 8th, 10th, 12th and 14th forming the Evens Conference.

All provincial teams played ten games during the regular season (round robin): six games against the teams in their own conference and four crossover games against teams from the other conference. Each team played five games at home and five games away. In 2022, the 10 round robin games are played over a period of nine weeks (starting on Friday 5 August 2022) and include one mid-week game to be played on a Wednesday night.

The regular season was followed by quarter-finals to be played by the four highest-ranked teams in each conference. The finals rankings are determined by the number of competition points earned during the regular season. Competition points can be gained in the following way: four points are awarded to the winning team, two points to each team for a draw, and no points for a loss. Teams can also receive a bonus point if they score four or more tries in a match, or lose by seven points or less.

If two or more provincial teams finish with an equal number of competition points, the following tiebreaker rules apply. If two unions are tied, the union which has defeated the other in a head-to-head is placed higher. In case of a draw between them, the side with the biggest points difference is ranked higher. If three or more unions are tied and they have all played each other, the team with most competition points in that year against the other tied unions is ranked higher; if they have not all played each other, the team with the biggest points difference in the round robin is ranked higher. In all cases, if these unions are still tied, the ranking is decided by the highest number of tries scored, the most points scored, or a coin toss.

Quarter-finals are played within each conference, with the highest ranked team in each conference playing the fourth ranked team in the same conference, and the second ranked team in each conference playing the third ranked team in the same conference:

QF 1: Odds 1 v Odds 4;
QF 2: Odds 2 v Odds 3;
QF 3: Evens 1 v Evens 4; and
QF 4: Evens 2 v Evens 3.

The two quarter-finals winners of the Odds conference will play the two quarter-finals winners of the Evens Conference (QF1 v QF4 and QF2 v QF3) at the home ground of the team with the higher finals ranking.

The NPC Final will be played between the two semi-final winners, again at the home venue of the team with the higher finals ranking.

No changes have been made to the rules governing Ranfurly Shield Challenges. Every home game during the regular season played by the union that holds the Ranfurly Shield is a mandartory challenge match. No challenge matches will be played after the regular season has ended (i.e., during the finals). A holder who competes in the Bunnings NPC must also accept at least two challenges from unions competing in the Heartland Championship, including the winner of the Meads Cup at the end of the previous season. These non-mandatory challenge matches must be played before the start of the NPC season.

== Standings ==
Source: Bunnings NPC standings 2022

Odds Conference
Pos	Team	GP	W	D	L	PF	PA	PD	TB	LB	PTS
1	RS – Wellington	10	8	0	2	299	240	+59	6	0	38
2	Waikato	10	7	1	2	301	208	+93	5	1	36
3	Bay of Plenty	10	6	0	4	325	232	+93	6	4	34
4	Hawke's Bay	10	5	1	4	294	234	+60	5	4	31
5	Otago	10	5	0	5	274	269	+5	3	4	27
6	Counties Manukau	10	3	0	7	256	335	–79	5	3	20
7	Southland	10	1	0	9	229	430	–201	2	3	9

Evens Conference
Pos	Team	GP	W	D	L	PF	PA	PD	TB	LB	PTS
1	Canterbury	10	9	0	1	389	208	+181	9	1	46
2	North Harbour	10	6	0	4	390	245	+145	7	1	32
3	Auckland	10	6	0	4	282	247	+35	4	2	30
4	Northland	10	6	0	4	212	265	–53	2	1	27
5	Tasman	10	4	0	6	282	282	+0	5	3	24
6	Taranaki	10	3	0	7	193	270	–77	1	2	15
7	Manawatu	10	0	0	10	212	473	–261	5	0	5

=== Standings progression ===
Odds
Team	W1	W2	W3	W4	W5	W6	W7	W8	W9
Bay of Plenty	2 (5th)	7 (3rd)	11 (4th)	12 (4th)	17 (4th)	22 (4th)	27 (3rd)	32 (2nd)	34 (3rd)
Counties Manukau	4 (2nd)	6 (5th)	6 (5th)	10 (5th)	10 (6th)	15 (6th)	17 (6th)	19 (6th)	20 (6th)
Hawke's Bay	3 (3rd)	9 (2nd)	14 (2nd)	18 (1st)	19 (2nd)	24 (2nd)	25 (4th)	26 (5th)	31 (4th)
Otago	1 (6th)	9 (1st)	14 (1st)	14 (3rd)	15 (5th)	17 (5th)	21 (5th)	26 (4th)	27 (5th)
Southland	1 (7th)	2 (7th)	4 (7th)	4 (7th)	4 (7th)	4 (7th)	4 (7th)	9 (7th)	9 (7th)
Waikato	3 (4th)	7 (4th)	12 (3rd)	17 (2nd)	21 (1st)	30 (1st)	31 (1st)	31 (3rd)	36 (2nd)
Wellington	5 (1st)	5 (6th)	5 (6th)	10 (6th)	19 (3rd)	24 (3rd)	28 (2nd)	33 (1st)	38 (1st)
Evens
Team	W1	W2	W3	W4	W5	W6	W7	W8	W9
Auckland	10 (1st)	14 (1st)	15 (1st)	20 (2nd)	21 (2nd)	21 (2nd)	25 (2nd)	25 (3rd)	30 (3rd)
Canterbury	5 (2nd)	10 (2nd)	11 (2nd)	21 (1st)	26 (1st)	31 (1st)	36 (1st)	41 (1st)	46 (1st)
Manawatu	0 (7th)	0 (7th)	0 (7th)	0 (7th)	1 (7th)	2 (7th)	3 (7th)	4 (7th)	5 (7th)
North Harbour	1 (6th)	6 (3rd)	10 (3rd)	11 (4th)	16 (4th)	17 (4th)	22 (3rd)	27 (2nd)	32 (2nd)
Northland	4 (4th)	5 (5th)	9 (4th)	14 (3rd)	18 (3rd)	18 (3rd)	18 (5th)	22 (5th)	27 (4th)
Taranaki	1 (5th)	1 (6th)	5 (6th)	6 (6th)	6 (6th)	6 (6th)	15 (6th)	15 (6th)	15 (6th)
Tasman	4 (3rd)	5 (4th)	6 (5th)	6 (5th)	12 (5th)	17 (5th)	19 (4th)	24 (4th)	24 (5th)
The table above shows a team's progression throughout the season. For each week, their cumulative points total is shown with the overall conference log position in brackets.
Key:	Win	Draw	Loss	Bye					

== Regular season ==
The regular season of the 2022 Bunnings NPC consists of 10 games that will be played over a period of nine weeks and include one mid-week game. The competition starts on Friday 5 August 2022, when Manawatū hosts Canterbury in Palmerston North.

=== Week 1 ===
5 August 2022
19:05 NZST

Manawatu	15–62	Canterbury
Try: Leif Schwencke 63'; Drew Wild 80+3'; Con: Brett Cameron (1/2) 64'; Pen: Brett Cameron (1/1) 6'	Report	Try: Fergus Burke (2) 11', 50'; Brodie McAlister (2) 21', 32'; George Bridge (2) 29', 75'; Manasa Mataele 46'; Will Gualter 66'; Chay Fihaki 71'; Con: Fergus Burke (4/5) 12', 33', 48', 51'; Alex Harford (3/4) 22', 68', 72'; Pen: Fergus Burke (1/1) 4'

Arena Manawatu, Palmerston North
Referee: Daniel Waenga

6 August 2022
14:05 NZST

Counties Manukau	23–22	Otago
Try: Zuriel Togiatama 9'; Esau Filimoehala 75'; Con: Riley Hohepa (2/2) 10', 77'; Pen: Riley Hohepa (2/2) 20', 53'; Drop: Riley Hohepa 80+2'	Report	Try: Thomas Umaga-Jensen 35'; Jona Nareki (2) 58', 65'; Con: Josh Ioane (1/1) 36'; Sam Gilbert (1/2) 59'; Pen: Josh Ioane (1/2) 45'

Navigation Homes Stadium, Pukekohe
Referee: Brendon Pickerill

6 August 2022
16:35 NZST

Waikato	32–32	Hawke's Bay
Try: Bailyn Sullivan 19'; D'Angelo Leuila 30'; James Tucker 33'; Daniel Sinkinson 47'; Con: Damian McKenzie (3/4) 20', 31', 34'; Pen: Damian McKenzie (2/4) 12', 59'; Cards: Luke Jacobson (yellow card) 65'	Report	Try: Isaia Walker-Leawere 6'; Brad Weber 27'; Danny Toala 45'; Tom Parsons 70'; Con: Caleb Makene (3/3) 7', 28', 46'; Danny Toala (0/1); Pen: Caleb Makene (2/2) 9', 40+2'

Waikato Stadium, Hamilton
Referee: Nick Briant

6 August 2022
19:05 NZST

Auckland	36–26	North Harbour
Try: AJ Lam 9'; Leni Apisai 33'; Penalty try 51'; Zarn Sullivan 52'; Soane Vikena 57'; Con: Harry Plummer (3/4) 11', 54', 59'; Pen: Harry Plummer (1/2) 6'; Cards: Connor Vest (yellow card) 7'	Report	Try: Penalty try 7'; Henry Taefu 13'; Cameron Suafoa 20'; Mark Tele'a 48'; Con: Bryn Gatland (2/3) 14', 21'; Pen: Shaun Stevenson (0/2); Cards: Nic Mayhew (yellow card) 51'

Eden Park, Auckland
Referee: James Doleman

7 August 2022
14:05 NZST

Taranaki	11–13	Northland
Try: Daniel Waite 19'; Con: Jayson Potroz (0/1); Pen: Jayson Potroz (0/2); Daniel Waite (2/2) 40+4', 58'; Cards: Hemopo Cunningham (yellow card) 75'	Report	Try: Jone Macilai-Tori 75'; Con: Daniel Hawkins (1/1) 77'; Pen: Rivez Reihana (1/2) 56'; Daniel Hawkins (1/1) 69'

Pukekura Park, New Plymouth
Referee: Jonathan Bredin

7 August 2022
16:35 NZST

Wellington	37–35	Bay of Plenty
Try: Julian Savea (2) 7', 13'; Riley Higgins (2) 35', 64'; Pepesana Patafilo 40'; James Blackwell 61'; Con: Ruben Love (0/4); Jackson Garden-Bachop (2/2) 62', 65'; Pen: Jackson Garden-Bachop (1/1) 58'	Report	Try: Naitoa Ah Kuoi 33'; Joey Walton 44'; Emoni Narawa 50'; Justin Sangster 54'; Con: Kaleb Trask (3/4) 45', 51', 55'; Pen: Kaleb Trask (3/3) 5', 18', 68'

Wellington Regional Stadium, Wellington
Attendance: 1,328
Referee: Paul Williams

7 August 2022
18:35 NZST

Tasman	27–20	Southland
Try: Max Hicks 4'; Noah Hotham 21'; Macca Springer 27'; Con: Campbell Parata (3/3) 5', 22', 28'; Pen: Campbell Parata (2/2) 12', 19'	Report	Try: Isaac Te Tamaki 8'; Grayson Knapp 47'; Con: Marty Banks (2/2) 9', 49'; Pen: Marty Banks (2/2) 3', 56'

Lansdowne Park, Blenheim
Referee: Ben O'Keeffe

10 August 2022
19:05 NZST

Manawatu	18–45	Auckland
Try: Ed Fidow 14'; Johnny Galloway 60'; Con: Brett Cameron (1/2) 61'; Pen: Brett Cameron (2/2) 6', 35'; Cards: Kegan Christian-Goss (yellow card) 73'	Report	Try: Niko Jones 24'; Vaiolini Ekuasi 31'; Terrell Peita 40'; Jordan Trainor 48'; Sofai Maka 73'; Hamish Dalzell 80'; Con: Simon Hickey (6/6) 25', 32', 40', 49', 74', 80'; Pen: Simon Hickey (1/1) 11'

Arena Manawatu, Palmerston North
Referee: Mike Fraser

=== Week 2 ===
12 August 2022
19:05 NZST

RS – Hawke's Bay	33–32	Counties Manukau
Try: Lincoln McClutchie 8'; Kianu Kereru-Symes 32'; Neria Fomai 35'; Solomone Funaki 40'; Tyrone Thompson 64'; Con: Lincoln McClutchie (4/5) 9', 33', 37', 40+1'	Report	Try: Ahsee Tuala 45'; Cam Roigard 57'; Etene Nanai-Seturo 72'; Ioane Moananu 79'; Con: Riley Hohepa (3/4) 58', 73', 80'; Pen: Riley Hohepa (2/2) 12', 29'; Cards: Sam Tuifua (yellow card) 50'

McLean Park, Napier
Referee: Ben O'Keeffe

13 August 2022
14:05 NZST

Otago	25–19	Tasman
Try: Ray Nu'u 19'; Thomas Umaga-Jensen 55'; Con: Cam Millar (0/2); Pen: Cam Millar (5/6) 27', 40+3', 44', 51', 73'; Cards: Ray Nu'u (yellow card) 63'	Report	Try: Timoci Tavatavanawai 35'; Quentin MacDonald 66'; Con: Campbell Parata (0/2); Pen: Campbell Parata (3/4) 40', 53', 79'

Forsyth Barr Stadium, Dunedin
Referee: Daniel Waenga

13 August 2022
16:35 NZST

Northland	10–16	Waikato
Try: Josh Moorby 4'; Con: Rivez Reihana (1/1) 5'; Pen: Rivez Reihana (1/1) 30'	Report	Try: Rhys Marshall 45'; Con: Damian McKenzie (1/1) 46'; Pen: Damian McKenzie (3/3) 6', 12', 56'

Okara Park, Whangārei
Referee: Stuart Curran

13 August 2022
19:05 NZST

Canterbury	43–10	Wellington
Try: George Bell 18'; George Bridge 36'; Dallas McLeod 59'; Cullen Grace (2) 64', 74'; Willi Heinz 77'; Con: Fergus Burke (4/5) 38', 60', 64', 75'; Alex Harford (1/1) 78'; Pen: Fergus Burke (1/1) 2'	Report	Try: Pepesana Patafilo 4'; Con: Jackson Garden-Bachop (1/1) 6'; Pen: Jackson Garden-Bachop (1/2) 30'; Cards: TJ Perenara (yellow card) 72'

Rugby League Park, Christchurch
Referee: James Doleman

14 August 2022
14:05 NZST

Southland	23–24	Auckland
Try: Isaac Te Tamaki 56'; Jakob Morrison 80+2'; Con: Marty Banks (1/1) 58'; Greg Dyer (1/1) 80+3'; Pen: Marty Banks (3/4) 8', 40+1', 62'; Cards: Josh Bekhuis (yellow card) 36'	Report	Try: Jackson Pugh 23'; Penalty try 37'; Salesi Rayasi 65'; Con: Harry Plummer (2/2) 24', 66'; Pen: Harry Plummer (1/1) 53'

Rugby Park Stadium, Invercargill
Referee: Jonathan Bredin

14 August 2022
14:05 NZST

Bay of Plenty	46–6	Taranaki
Try: Justin Sangster 9'; Tevita Mafileo 34'; Naitoa Ah Kuoi 46'; Inga Finau 61'; Emoni Narawa 73'; Nikora Broughton 80'; Con: Kaleb Trask (4/4) 10', 36', 48', 62'; Wharenui Hawera (1/1) 80+1'; Pen: Kaleb Trask (2/3) 17', 65'; Wharenui Hawera (0/1)	Report	Pen: Jayson Potroz (2/2) 20', 40+1'

Tauranga Domain, Tauranga
Referee: Brendon Pickerill

14 August 2022
16:35 NZST

North Harbour	64–14	Manawatu
Try: Tevita Li (3) 5', 20', 39'; Shaun Stevenson 7'; Cameron Suafoa 42'; Jay Fonokalafi 63'; Jack Heighton 65'; Siaosi Nginingini 71'; Mark Tele'a 80+1'; Con: Bryn Gatland (4/5) 6', 7', 21', 43'; Shaun Stevenson (3/3) 64', 67', 72'; Alex Fidow (1/1) 80+2'; Pen: Bryn Gatland (1/1) 13'; Cards: Shaun Stevenson (yellow card) 25'	Report	Try: Penalty try 26'; Tima Fainga'anuku 58'; Con: Brett Cameron (1/1) 60'

North Harbour Stadium, Albany
Referee: Paul Williams

17 August 2022
19:05 NZST

Otago	18–13	Hawke's Bay
Try: Josh Ioane 33'; Ricky Jackson 45'; Con: Cam Millar (1/2) 35'; Pen: Cam Millar (2/4) 29', 66'; Cards: Josh Hill (yellow card) 73'	Report	Try: Tyrone Thompson 16'; Con: Harry Godfrey (1/1) 17'; Pen: Harry Godfrey (2/2) 39', 80'

Forsyth Barr Stadium, Dunedin
Referee: Marcus Playle

=== Week 3 ===
19 August 2022
19:05 NZST

Counties Manukau	20–34	Waikato
Try: Zuriel Togiatama 10'; Cam Roigard 41'; Con: Riley Hohepa (2/2) 12', 42'; Pen: Riley Hohepa (2/2) 7', 71'	Report	Try: Laghlan McWhannell 17'; Ollie Norris 57'; Xavier Roe 73'; Mosese Dawai 80+4'; Con: Damian McKenzie (4/4) 18', 58', 75', 80+6'; Pen: Damian McKenzie (2/2) 36', 64'

Navigation Homes Stadium, Pukekohe
Referee: Angus Mabey

20 August 2022
14:05 NZST

Taranaki	16–10	Canterbury
Try: Daniel Rona 27'; Con: Stephen Perofeta (1/1) 28'; Pen: Stephen Perofeta (3/4) 15', 46', 50'	Report	Try: George Bridge 69'; George Bell 76'; Con: Fergus Burke (0/2)

Pukekura Park, New Plymouth
Referee: Brendon Pickerill

20 August 2022
14:05 NZST

Wellington	6–15	Northland
Pen: Jackson Garden-Bachop (2/3) 2', 34'; Ruben Love (0/2)	Report	Try: Rob Rush 35'; Josh Moorby 40+1'; Con: Rivez Reihana (1/2) 37'; Pen: Rivez Reihana (1/1) 9'

Jerry Collins Stadium, Porirua
Referee: Cameron Stone

20 August 2022
17:05 NZST

North Harbour	35–27	Tasman
Try: Kade Banks 28'; Tevita Li 31'; Con: Bryn Gatland (2/2) 29', 32'; Pen: Bryn Gatland (7/7) 14', 18', 24', 49', 61', 69', 79'	Report	Try: Sevu Reece (2) 8', 54'; Noah Hotham 20'; Andrew Makalio 39'; Con: Campbell Parata (2/4) 40', 55'; Pen: Campbell Parata (1/2) 51'; Cards: Sevu Reece (yellow card) 27'

North Harbour Stadium, Albany
Referee: Damon Murphy (Australia)

21 August 2022
14:05 NZST

Auckland	17–21	Bay of Plenty
Try: AJ Lam 9'; Salesi Rayasi 80+1'; Con: Harry Plummer (1/1) 10'; Simon Hickey (1/1) 80+1'; Pen: Harry Plummer (1/1) 5'; Cards: Harry Plummer (yellow card) 21'	Report	Try: Inga Finau 38'; Nigel Ah Wong 56'; Con: Kaleb Trask (1/2) 57'; Pen: Kaleb Trask (3/4) 17', 63', 77'

Eden Park, Auckland
Referee: Paul Williams

21 August 2022
14:05 NZST

Southland	32–37	Otago
Try: Grayson Knapp 15'; Matt Whaanga 39'; Matthew James 49'; Viliami Fine 77'; Con: Marty Banks (3/4) 16', 50', 77'; Pen: Marty Banks (2/2) 19', 60'	Report	Try: Henry Bell 11'; Freedom Vahaakolo 20'; James Lentjes 35'; Josh Dickson 63'; Con: Josh Ioane (4/4) 13', 22', 37', 64'; Pen: Josh Ioane (3/4) 6', 46', 56'

Rugby Park Stadium, Invercargill
Referee: James Doleman

21 August 2022
16:35 NZST

Manawatu	17–43	Hawke's Bay
Try: Siua Maile (2) 5', 8'; Con: Brett Cameron (2/2) 7', 9'; Pen: Brett Cameron (1/3) 21'; Cards: Micaiah Torrance-Read (yellow card) 48'	Report	Try: Brad Weber 14', 22'; Lolagi Visinia 37'; Lincoln McClutchie 67'; Tyrone Thompson 70'; Sam Smith 80'; Con: Lincoln McClutchie (5/6) 15', 38', 68', 71', 80+1'; Drop: Chase Tiatia 76'; Cards: Tom Parsons (yellow card) 48'

Arena Manawatu, Palmerston North
Referee: Ben O'Keeffe

=== Week 4 ===
26 August 2022
17:35 NZST

Tasman	20–52	Canterbury
Try: Macca Springer (2) 27', 69'; William Havili 80+1'; Con: Campbell Parata (0/1); William Havili (1/2) 69'; Pen: Campbell Parata (1/1) 2'	Report	Try: Manasa Mataele 14'; Sam Darry 18'; Dominic Gardiner 31'; Fergus Burke 46'; Rameka Poihipi 52'; Billy Harmon 62'; Tamaiti Williams 73'; Con: Fergus Burke (7/7) 16', 19', 32', 48', 53', 63', 75'; Pen: Fergus Burke (1/1) 4'

Lansdowne Park, Blenheim
Referee: Mike Fraser

26 August 2022
19:35 NZST

Waikato	53–6	Manawatu
Try: Daniel Sinkinson (2) 16', 80+2'; Liam Coombes-Fabling 30'; Damian McKenzie 52'; Luke Jacobson 61'; Rhys Marshall 68'; Cortez Ratima 72'; Taha Kemara 78'; Con: Damian McKenzie (3/5) 31', 54', 69'; Taha Kemara (2/3) 73', 79'; Pen: Damian McKenzie (1/1) 6'	Report	Pen: Brett Cameron (2/2) 13', 25'

Waikato Stadium, Hamilton
Referee: Stu Catley

27 August 2022
14:05 NZST

RS – Hawke's Bay	25–23	North Harbour
Try: Chase Tiatia 10'; Lolagi Visinia 21'; Kianu Kereru-Symes 75'; Con: Lincoln McClutchie (2/3) 11', 77'; Pen: Lincoln McClutchie (2/2) 44', 70'	Report	Try: Tevita Li (3) 17', 40', 58'; Con: Bryn Gatland (1/3) 40+1'; Pen: Bryn Gatland (2/3) 16', 46'; Cards: Shaun Stevenson (yellow card) 74'

McLean Park, Napier
Referee: Angus Mabey

27 August 2022
16:35 NZST

Auckland	35–17	Otago
Try: Blake Gibson 3'; AJ Lam 11'; Penalty try 40+6'; Salesi Rayasi 53'; Jordan Trainor 63'; Con: Harry Plummer (4/4) 4', 11', 54', 64'; Cards: Jordan Trainor (yellow card) 67'; Connor Vest (yellow card) 67'	Report	Try: Freedom Vahaakolo 44'; Oliver Haig 74'; Sam Gilbert 78'; Con: Josh Ioane (0/1); Cam Millar (1/2) 79'; Pen: Josh Ioane (0/1)

Eden Park, Auckland
Referee: Cameron Stone

28 August 2022
14:05 NZST

Bay of Plenty	13–18	Counties Manukau
Try: Gillies Kaka 8'; Emoni Narawa 53'; Con: Kaleb Trask (0/2); Pen: Kaleb Trask (1/2) 23'; Cards: Zane Kapeli (yellow card) 40+1'	Report	Pen: Riley Hohepa (6/6) 7', 27', 31', 47', 61', 78'

Tauranga Domain, Tauranga
Referee: Nick Briant

28 August 2022
14:05 NZST

Wellington	31–25	Taranaki
Try: Peter Umaga-Jensen 6'; Nehe Milner-Skudder 20'; Peter Lakai (3) 34', 42', 54'; Con: Aidan Morgan (3/5) 35', 43', 55'; Cards: Asafo Aumua (yellow card) 66'	Report	Try: Jayson Potroz 47'; Kini Naholo 60'; Pita Gus Sowakula 78'; Con: Jayson Potroz (1/2) 48'; Daniel Waite (1/1) 79'; Pen: Jayson Potroz (2/2) 24', 28'

Wellington Regional Stadium, Wellington
Attendance: 1,281
Referee: Stuart Curran

28 August 2022
16:35 NZST

Northland	32–19	Southland
Try: Lisati Milo-Harris (2) 19', 29'; Rob Rush 40'; Heremaia Murray 68'; Con: Rivez Reihana (3/3) 21', 31', 40+1'; Daniel Hawkins (0/1); Pen: Rivez Reihana (2/3) 8', 14'; Cards: Daniel Hawkins (red card) 80+1'	Report	Try: Viliami Fine 34'; Joe Robins 58'; Rory van Vugt 80+2'; Con: Marty Banks (2/2) 36', 58'; Robbie Robinson (0/1)

Okara Park, Whangārei
Referee: Mike Winter

31 August 2022
19:05 NZST

Canterbury	35–22	North Harbour
Try: Ngane Punivai 15'; Dallas McLeod 25'; Willi Heinz 35'; Tamaiti Williams 69'; Con: Alex Harford (3/4) 16', 36', 71'; Pen: Alex Harford (3/3) 3', 8', 66'	Report	Try: Felix Kalapu 40+1'; Tevita Langi 56'; Tika Lelenga 72'; Con: Shaun Stevenson (2/2) 40+2', 57'; Bryn Gatland (0/1); Pen: Shaun Stevenson (1/2) 19'

Rugby League Park, Christchurch
Referee: Jonathan Bredin

=== Week 5 ===
2 September 2022
19:05 NZST

Manawatu	26–36	Tasman
Try: Brett Cameron 21'; Siua Maile 38'; Tima Fainga'anuku 73'; Adam Boult 80'; Con: Brett Cameron (3/3) 22', 74', 80+1'; Drew Wild (0/1)	Report	Try: Leicester Fainga'anuku 4'; Taine Robinson 13'; Macca Springer (2) 30', 53'; Quinten Strange 63'; Con: William Havili (4/5) 5', 15', 31', 54'; Pen: William Havili (1/1) 9'; Cards: Isaac Salmon (yellow card) 41'

Arena Manawatu, Palmerston North
Referee: Nick Hogan

3 September 2022
14:05 NZST

Northland	23–22	Auckland
Try: Matt Moulds 16'; Heremaia Murray 43'; Bruce Kauika-Petersen 63'; Con: Rivez Reihana (1/1) 65'; Pen: Rivez Reihana (2/3) 22', 80'; Cards: Coree Te Whata-Colley (yellow card) 40+1'	Report	Try: Tomas Aoake 37'; Robbie Abel 40+2'; Penalty try 57'; Con: Harry Plummer (1/2) 38'; Pen: Harry Plummer (1/1) 69'

Okara Park, Whangārei
Referee: Stu Catley

3 September 2022
14:05 NZST

Taranaki	6–21	Waikato
Pen: Daniel Waite (2/3) 3', 40+2'	Report	Try: D'Angelo Leuila 15'; Mosese Dawai 75'; Con: Damian McKenzie (1/2) 17'; Pen: Damian McKenzie (3/3) 48', 66', 71'

Yarrow Stadium, New Plymouth
Referee: Angus Mabey

3 September 2022
16:35 NZST

Southland	28–41	Wellington
Try: Morgan Mitchell 29'; Quinn Harrison-Jones 69'; Blair Ryall 80'; Con: Robbie Robinson (2/3) 30', 80+1'; Pen: Robbie Robinson (3/4) 3', 30', 53'	Report	Try: Asafo Aumua 25'; Sione Halalilo 37'; Connor Garden-Bachop 40+1'; Aidan Morgan 48'; Nehe Milner-Skudder (2) 57', 63'; Con: Aidan Morgan (3/5) 26', 38', 40+3'; Jackson Garden-Bachop (1/1) 64'; Pen: Jackson Garden-Bachop (1/1) 74'; Cards: Billy Proctor (yellow card) 69'

Rugby Park Stadium, Invercargill
Referee: Marcus Playle

4 September 2022
14:05 NZST

Canterbury	32–28	Hawke's Bay
Try: Ngane Punivai 26'; Isaiah Punivai 62'; Billy Harmon 64'; Tom Christie 77'; Con: Fergus Burke (3/4) 63', 65', 78'; Pen: Fergus Burke (2/2) 47', 68'; Cards: Rameka Poihipi (yellow card) 52'	Report	Try: Lolagi Visinia 15'; Ollie Sapsford 49'; Brad Weber 55'; Con: Lincoln McClutchie (2/3) 16', 56'; Pen: Lincoln McClutchie (2/2) 6', 36'; Brad Weber (1/1) 75'; Cards: Solomone Funaki (yellow card) 25'

Rugby League Park, Christchurch
Referee: James Doleman

4 September 2022
14:05 NZST

Otago	27–33	Bay of Plenty
Try: Sam Gilbert 3'; Josh Hill 47'; Vilimoni Koroi 61'; Con: Cam Millar (3/3) 4', 48', 62'; Pen: Cam Millar (2/2) 28', 38'	Report	Try: Emoni Narawa (2) 11', 49'; Manaaki Selby-Rickit 18'; Justin Sangster 56'; Con: Kaleb Trask (2/4) 51', 57'; Pen: Kaleb Trask (3/3) 45', 74', 78'

Forsyth Barr Stadium, Dunedin
Referee: Mike Fraser

4 September 2022
16:35 NZST

North Harbour	37–12	Counties Manukau
Try: Tevita Li 30'; Henry Taefu 35'; Jamie Booth 39'; Mark Tele'a 74'; Penalty try 80'; Con: Bryn Gatland (2/4) 36', 40'; Pen: Bryn Gatland (2/2) 2', 57'; Cards: Lotu Inisi (yellow card) 48'	Report	Try: Penisoni Fineanganofo 17'; Tevita Ofa 45'; Con: Riley Hohepa (1/2) 18'; Pen: Riley Hohepa (0/2); Cards: Ahsee Tuala (yellow card) 80'

North Harbour Stadium, Albany
Referee: Michael Winter

7 September 2022
19:05 NZST

Tasman	19–25	Wellington
Try: Noah Hotham 79'; Con: Taine Robinson (1/1) 80'; Pen: William Havili (4/4) 3', 37', 44', 59'	Report	Try: Connor Garden-Bachop 29'; Sione Halalilo 34'; Xavier Numia 62'; Con: Jackson Garden-Bachop (2/3) 35', 64'; Pen: Jackson Garden-Bachop (2/3) 39', 80+2'

Trafalgar Park, Nelson
Referee: Brendon Pickerill

=== Week 6 ===
9 September 2022
19:05 NZST

Waikato	30–15	Auckland
Try: Daniel Sinkinson 24'; Tepaea Cook-Savage 37'; Patrick McCurran 60'; Con: Damian McKenzie (3/3) 26', 39', 61'; Pen: Damian McKenzie (3/3) 18', 53', 69'; Cards: Cortez Ratima (yellow card) 80'	Report	Try: Jordan Trainor 27'; Harry Plummer 58'; Con: Harry Plummer (1/2) 28'; Pen: Harry Plummer (1/1) 21'

Waikato Stadium, Hamilton
Referee: Brendon Pickerill

10 September 2022
14:05 NZST

RS – Hawke's Bay	69–24	Southland
Try: Pouri Rakete-Stones 11'; Tyrone Thompson (3) 16', 32', 50'; Brad Weber 22'; Neria Fomai 45'; Ollie Sapsford (2) 59', 80+3'; Kianu Kereru-Symes (2) 70', 75'; Con: Lincoln McClutchie (7/9) 12', 23', 47', 51', 61', 71', 80+4'; Marino Mikaele-Tu'u (1/1) 76'; Pen: Lincoln McClutchie (1/1) 67'	Report	Try: Rory van Vugt 8'; Robbie Robinson 24'; Viliami Fine 63'; Con: Marty Banks (3/3) 9', 26', 65'; Pen: Marty Banks (1/1) 28'

McLean Park, Napier
Referee: Nick Briant

10 September 2022
16:35 NZST

North Harbour	34–48	Bay of Plenty
Try: Luteru Tolai 27'; Bryn Gatland 56'; Mark Tele'a 64'; Cameron Suafoa 78'; Con: Bryn Gatland (4/4) 29', 57', 65', 79'; Pen: Bryn Gatland (2/2) 3', 45'; Cards: Cameron Suafoa (yellow card) 39'	Report	Try: Inga Finau 6'; Kurt Eklund (3) 35', 47', 51'; Naitoa Ah Kuoi (2) 40', 62'; Con: Kaleb Trask (6/6) 7', 36', 40+1', 48', 52', 63'; Pen: Kaleb Trask (2/2) 16', 68'; Cards: Nikora Broughton (yellow card) 54'; Taylor Haugh (yellow card) 74'

North Harbour Stadium, Albany
Referee: Paul Williams

10 September 2022
19:05 NZST

Counties Manukau	41–33	Manawatu
Try: Peniasi Malimali (2) 2', 34'; Jared Page (2) 14', 39'; AJ Alatimu 31'; Cam Roigard 77'; Con: Riley Hohepa (4/6) 2', 15', 32', 40+1'; Pen: Riley Hohepa (1/1) 74'; Cards: Sam Slade (yellow card) 21'; Adam Brash (yellow card) 64'	Report	Try: Siua Maile 9'; Logan Henry 40+6'; Veikoso Poloniati 70'; Ed Fidow 78'; Potu Leavasa Jr. 80+4'; Con: Brett Cameron (3/4) 10', 40+7', 70'; Sam Clarke (1/1) 80+5'

Navigation Homes Stadium, Pukekohe
Referee: Marcus Playle

11 September 2022
14:05 NZST

Tasman	38–27	Taranaki
Try: Noah Hotham (2) 17', 38'; Braden Stewart 24'; Levi Aumua 41'; Tomasi Alosio 75'; Con: William Havili (4/4) 19', 25', 40', 42'; Campbell Parata (1/1) 77'; Pen: Campbell Parata (1/1) 62'	Report	Try: Tom Florence 54'; Kini Naholo 58'; Logan Crowley 78'; Con: Matt McKenzie (3/3) 55', 59', 78'; Pen: Daniel Waite (2/2) 2', 29'

Trafalgar Park, Nelson
Referee: Ben O'Keeffe

11 September 2022
14:05 NZST

Wellington	32–26	Otago
Try: Du'Plessis Kirifi 7'; Ruben Love 11'; TJ Perenara 17'; Xavier Numia 30'; Con: Aidan Morgan (3/4) 8', 19', 31'; Pen: Aidan Morgan (2/2) 43', 47'; Cards: Dominic Bird (yellow card) 40+4'; Richard Judd (yellow card) 75'	Report	Try: Josh Timu 26'; Henry Bell (2) 40+5', 65'; James Lentjes 53'; Con: Cam Millar (3/3) 27', 40+6', 66'; Josh Ioane (0/1); Cards: Sam Gilbert (yellow card) 40+1'

Wellington Regional Stadium, Wellington
Attendance: 1,571
Referee: Paul Williams

11 September 2022
16:35 NZST

Canterbury	46–17	Northland
Try: Billy Harmon 27'; Penalty try 38'; Brodie McAlister (2) 54', 70'; Ngane Punivai (2) 58', 73'; Con: Fergus Burke (4/4) 28', 55', 59', 70'; Alex Harford (0/1); Pen: Fergus Burke (2/2) 44', 48'	Report	Try: Allan Craig 32'; Heremaia Murray 60'; Con: Rivez Reihana (2/2) 34', 62'; Pen: Rivez Reihana (1/1) 13'; Cards: Matt Matich (yellow card) 38'

Rugby League Park, Christchurch
Referee: Stuart Curran

14 September 2022
19:05 NZST

Waikato	54–24	Southland
Try: Rob Cobb 5'; Daniel Sinkinson (3) 11', 56', 63'; Tana Tuhakaraina 48'; Taha Kemara (2) 51', 73'; Damian McKenzie 60'; Con: Taha Kemara (6/7) 6', 13', 49', 52', 61', 64'; Damian McKenzie (1/1) 58'; Cards: Mitch Jacobson (yellow card) 39'	Report	Try: Jay Renton 18'; Morgan Mitchell 40+1'; Jack MacLeod 66'; Con: Robbie Robinson (2/2) 19', 40+1'; Jack MacLeod (1/1) 67'; Pen: Robbie Robinson (1/1) 43'; Cards: Viliami Fine (yellow card) 58'

Waikato Stadium, Hamilton
Referee: Jonathan Bredin

=== Week 7 ===
16 September 2022
19:05 NZST

Taranaki	34–24	Manawatu
Try: Vereniki Tikoisolomone 6'; Kini Naholo (2) 15', 24'; Ricky Riccitelli 39'; Con: Daniel Waite (4/4) 7', 16', 24', 40+1'; Pen: Daniel Waite (2/2) 75', 79'	Report	Try: Siua Maile 11'; Luke Campbell 29'; Ben Strang 54'; Tima Fainga'anuku 80+1'; Con: Brett Cameron (1/2) 30'; Sam Clarke (1/1) 80+3'

Yarrow Stadium, New Plymouth
Referee: Michael Winter

17 September 2022
14:05 NZST

Counties Manukau	39–44	Canterbury
Try: Sam Tuifua 17'; Alex McRobbie 26'; Tevita Ofa 62'; AJ Alatimu 66'; Esau Filimoehala 80+1'; Con: Riley Hohepa (4/5) 18', 64', 68', 80+2'; Pen: Riley Hohepa (2/3) 15', 39'	Report	Try: Brodie McAlister (2) 23', 29'; Isaiah Punivai 34'; Ngane Punivai 52'; Tom Christie 58'; Dallas McLeod 74'; Con: Fergus Burke (3/5) 24', 53', 59'; Chay Fihaki (1/1) 74'; Pen: Fergus Burke (2/2) 2', 10'; Chay Fihaki (0/1)

Navigation Homes Stadium, Pukekohe
Referee: Cameron Stone

17 September 2022
16:35 NZST

Auckland	30–27	Tasman
Try: AJ Lam 14'; Roger Tuivasa-Sheck 24'; Blake Gibson 76'; Con: Taufa Funaki (1/1) 16'; Harry Plummer (1/1) 26'; Simon Hickey (1/1) 77'; Pen: Harry Plummer (3/4) 40+3', 56', 67'; Cards: Harry Plummer (yellow card) 11'	Report	Try: Sione Havili Talitui 28'; Macca Springer (2) 33', 63'; Fetuli Paea 52'; Con: William Havili (2/4) 34', 53'; Pen: William Havili (1/2) 12'; Cards: Max Hicks (yellow card) 76'

Eden Park, Auckland
Referee: Paul Williams

17 September 2022
19:05 NZST

Hawke's Bay	12–19	Wellington – RS
Pen: Lincoln McClutchie (4/4) 10', 15', 38', 72'; Cards: Joe Apikotoa (yellow card) 40'	Report	Try: TJ Perenara 42'; Con: Aidan Morgan (1/1) 43'; Pen: Aidan Morgan(4/5) 12', 19', 40+1', 52'; Cards: TJ Perenara (yellow card) 80+1'

McLean Park, Napier
Attendance: 8,288
Referee: Brendon Pickerill

18 September 2022
14:05 NZST

Otago	27–20	Waikato
Try: Josh Dickson 19'; Will Tucker 69'; Josh Timu 72'; Con: Cam Millar (3/3) 21', 70', 73'; Pen: Cam Millar (2/2) 7', 57'	Report	Try: Damian McKenzie 12'; Bailyn Sullivan 16'; Con: Damian McKenzie (2/2) 14', 17'; Pen: Damian McKenzie (2/3) 54', 60'

Forsyth Barr Stadium, Dunedin
Referee: Ben O'Keeffe

18 September 2022
14:05 NZST

Bay of Plenty	54–21	Southland
Try: Kohan Herbert 8'; Tevita Mafileo 16'; Emoni Narawa (2) 22', 33'; Inga Finau 38'; Lalomilo Lalomilo 50'; Justin Sangster 67'; Veveni Lasaqa 80+2'; Con: Lucas Cashmore (6/7) 9', 24', 35', 38', 51', 68'; Manaaki Selby-Rickit (1/1) 80+3'; Cards: Aidan Ross (yellow card) 40+3'; Naitoa Ah Kuoi (yellow card) 61'	Report	Try: Michael Manson (2) 5', 71'; Solomon Alaimalo 43'; Con: Robbie Robinson (3/3) 6', 44', 71'

Tauranga Domain, Tauranga
Referee: Daniel Waenga

18 September 2022
16:35 NZST

Northland	21–48	North Harbour
Try: Sam Nock 9'; Josh Goodhue 22'; Tamati Tua 31'; Con: Rivez Reihana (3/3) 11', 23', 32'; Pen: Rivez Reihana (0/1)	Report	Try: Tamarau McGahan 6'; Isoa Nasilasila 12'; Shaun Stevenson (3) 27', 55', 80+3'; Jamie Booth 62'; Con: Bryn Gatland (6/6) 7', 13', 29', 55', 63', 80+4'; Pen: Bryn Gatland (2/2) 35', 40+2'

Okara Park, Whangārei
Referee: Marcus Playle

21 September 2022
19:05 NZST

Taranaki	25–14	Counties Manukau
Try: Kaylum Boshier 7'; Daniel Waite 34'; Kini Naholo 49'; Con: Daniel Waite (2/3) 8', 35'; Pen: Daniel Waite (2/2) 17', 26'	Report	Try: Riley Hohepa 22'; Sam Tuifua 60'; Con: Riley Hohepa (2/2) 24', 61'

Yarrow Stadium, New Plymouth
Referee: Nick Hogan

=== Week 8 ===
23 September 2022
19:05 NZST

Canterbury	38–20	Auckland
Try: Penalty try 32'; Dominic Gardiner 35'; Manasa Mataele 40+1'; Tom Christie 49'; Rameka Poihipi 67'; Con: Alex Harford (4/4) 36', 40+3', 49', 68'; Drop: Alex Harford (1/1) 47'	Report	Try: Salesi Rayasi 3'; Jackson Pugh 61'; Joel Cobb 74'; Con: Harry Plummer (1/3) 4'; Pen: Harry Plummer (1/1) 16'; Cards: Blake Gibson (yellow card) 12'; Taufa Funaki (yellow card) 32'; Niko Jones (red card) 77'

Rugby League Park, Christchurch
Referee: Daniel Waenga

24 September 2022
14:05 NZST

Bay of Plenty	20–14	Hawke's Bay
Try: Emoni Narawa 6'; Nikora Broughton 42'; Nigel Ah Wong 57'; Con: Kaleb Trask (1/3) 7'; Pen: Kaleb Trask (1/3) 18'	Report	Try: Devan Flanders 23'; Ollie Sapsford 31'; Con: Lincoln McClutchie (2/2) 25', 32'

Tauranga Domain, Tauranga
Referee: Angus Mabey

24 September 2022
14:05 NZST

Tasman	52–17	Northland
Try: Levi Aumua (2) 19', 46'; William Havili 36'; Alex Nankivell 39'; Noah Hotham 63'; Macca Springer 67'; Ryan Coxon 78'; Con: William Havili (1/1) 19'; Taine Robinson (6/6) 37', 40+1', 47', 64', 69', 80'; Pen: Taine Robinson (1/2) 54'	Report	Try: Matt Matich 51'; Jaycob Matiu 60'; Con: Rivez Reihana (1/1) 53'; Daniel Hawkins (1/1) 61'; Pen: Rivez Reihana (1/1) 26'; Cards: Heremaia Murray (yellow card) 67'

Trafalgar Park, Nelson
Referee: Michael Winter

24 September 2022
16:35 NZST

RS – Wellington	34–6	Waikato
Try: Pepesana Patafilo 33'; Connor Garden-Bachop 64'; James O'Reilly 73'; Ruben Love 80+2'; Con: Aidan Morgan (1/1) 35'; Jackson Garden-Bachop (3/3) 65', 74', 80+3'; Pen: Aidan Morgan (2/3) 12', 44'; Jackson Garden-Bachop (0/2)	Report	Pen: Damian McKenzie (2/2) 19', 40+2'; Cards: Pita Anae Ah-Sue (yellow card) 51'

Wellington Regional Stadium, Wellington
Attendance: 3,377
Referee: Jonathan Bredin

25 September 2022
14:05 NZST

Manawatu	35–54	Otago
Try: Jason Emery 5'; Siua Maile 17'; Drew Wild (2) 46', 59'; Logan Henry 80'; Con: Brett Cameron (4/4) 6', 18', 48', 60'; Sam Clarke (1/1) 80+1'	Report	Try: Abraham Pole (2) 25', 34'; Fabian Holland 29'; Henry Bell 38'; Kemara Hauiti-Parapara 43'; Mitchell Scott 50'; Oliver Haig 63'; Sean Withy 73'; Con: Cam Millar (7/8) 26', 30', 36', 39', 44', 65', 75'

Arena Manawatu, Palmerston North
Referee: Cameron Stone

25 September 2022
14:05 NZST

North Harbour	35–19	Taranaki
Try: Kade Banks 4'; Isoa Nasilasila 37'; Bryn Gatland 44'; Kalolo Tuiloma 49'; Tevita Li 59'; Con: Bryn Gatland (5/5) 5', 39', 45', 50', 60'	Report	Try: Bradley Slater 11'; Kaylum Boshier 23'; Liam Blyde 78'; Con: Stephen Perofeta (1/2) 24'; Daniel Waite (1/1) 79'

North Harbour Stadium, Albany
Referee: Mike Fraser

25 September 2022
16:35 NZST

Southland	30–26	Counties Manukau
Try: Sam Stewart 26'; Matt Whaanga 39'; Jacob Payne 69'; Paula Latu 73'; Con: Robbie Robinson (2/4) 70', 74'; Pen: Robbie Robinson (2/2) 54', 80'; Cards: Hayden Michaels (red card) 42'	Report	Try: Peniasi Malimali (2) 19', 53'; Adam Brash (2) 50', 58'; Con: Riley Hohepa (3/4) 51', 53', 60'

Rugby Park Stadium, Invercargill
Referee: Fraser Hannon

28 September 2022
16:05 NZST

Bay of Plenty	21–23	Northland
Try: Veveni Lasaqa 19'; Luke Donaldson 69'; Con: Wharenui Hawera (1/2) 70'; Pen: Wharenui Hawera (3/4) 48', 52', 73'	Report	Try: Josh Moorby 23'; Matt Matich 38'; Jone Macilai-Tori 59'; Con: Rivez Reihana (1/3) 24'; Pen: Rivez Reihana (1/2) 4'; Daniel Hawkins (1/1) 80+4'

Tauranga Domain, Tauranga
Referee: Ben O'Keeffe

=== Week 9 ===
30 September 2022
19:05 NZST

Hawke's Bay	25–17	Tasman
Try: Tyrone Thompson 3'; Neria Fomai (2) 29', 47'; Marino Mikaele-Tu'u 40+1'; Con: Lincoln McClutchie (1/4) 40+2'; Pen: Lincoln McClutchie (1/1) 71'	Report	Try: Noah Hotham 34'; Viliami Napa'a 78'; Con: Taine Robinson (1/1) 35'; William Havili (1/1) 79'; Pen: Taine Robinson (1/2) 9'; William Havili (0/1)

McLean Park, Napier
Referee: Nick Briant

1 October 2022
14:05 NZST

Southland	8–66	North Harbour
Try: Michael Manson 79'; Con: Jack MacLeod (0/1); Pen: Robbie Robinson (1/1) 22'; Cards: Robbie Robinson (yellow card) 29'	Report	Try: Jamie Booth (2) 13', 45'; Tevita Li (3) 29', 33', 80+1'; Shaun Stevenson 38'; Bryn Gatland 40'; Jack Heighton 47'; Felix Kalapu 58'; Jay Fonokalafi 75'; Con: Bryn Gatland (7/9) 14', 29', 34', 39', 40+1', 46', 76'; Jack Heighton (1/1) 59'; Cards: Siaosi Nginingini (yellow card) 62'

Rugby Park Stadium, Invercargill
Referee: James Doleman

1 October 2022
16:35 NZST

Auckland	38–24	Taranaki
Try: Terrell Peita (2) 44', 66'; Angus Ta'avao 48'; AJ Lam (2) 57', 73'; Con: Harry Plummer (4/4) 45', 49', 59', 73'; Simon Hickey (1/1) 68'; Pen: Harry Plummer (1/1) 14'	Report	Try: Daniel Rona 3'; Ricky Riccitelli 25'; Kini Naholo 51'; Con: Stephen Perofeta (3/3) 5', 27', 52'; Pen: Stephen Perofeta (1/2) 40+3'

Eden Park, Auckland
Referee: Brendon Pickerill

1 October 2022
19:05 NZST

Otago	21–27	Canterbury
Try: James Lentjes 9'; Josh Timu 34'; Kieran McClea 55'; Con: Cam Millar (3/3) 10', 36', 56'	Report	Try: Luke Romano 24'; Braydon Ennor 27'; Fergus Burke 59'; Manasa Mataele 65'; Con: Fergus Burke (1/2) 24'; Chay Fihaki (1/1) 66'; Pen: Fergus Burke (1/1) 44'

Forsyth Barr Stadium, Dunedin
Referee: Ben O'Keeffe

2 October 2022
14:05 NZST

Counties Manukau	31–64	Wellington
Try: Sam Slade 10'; Peniasi Malimali 47'; Ioane Moananu (2) 56', 68'; Kauvaka Kaivelata 80+1'; Con: Riley Hohepa (2/3) 11', 49'; Cam Roigard (1/2) 69'; Cards: Alex McRobbie (yellow card) 43'	Report	Try: Riley Higgins 7'; Connor Garden-Bachop 12'; Asafo Aumua (4) 22', 50', 72', 75'; Du'Plessis Kirifi 25'; Ruben Love 29'; Nehe Milner-Skudder 39'; Billy Proctor 59'; Con: Jackson Garden-Bachop (7/10) 8', 13', 23', 40+1', 60', 73', 77'

Navigation Homes Stadium, Pukekohe
Referee: Cameron Stone

2 October 2022
14:05 NZST

Northland	41–24	Manawatu
Try: Rob Rush 11'; Tamati Tua 15'; Matt Moulds 33'; Rivez Reihana 46'; Josh Moorby 64'; Matt Matich 69'; Con: Rivez Reihana (3/4) 13', 35', 47'; Daniel Hawkins (1/2) 70'; Pen: Daniel Hawkins (1/1) 80'	Report	Try: Tima Fainga'anuku 21'; Josh Taula 52'; Logan Henry (2) 60', 77'; Con: Sam Clarke (1/2) 53'; Drew Wild (1/2) 61'

Okara Park, Whangārei
Referee: Angus Mabey

2 October 2022
16:35 NZST

Waikato	35–34	Bay of Plenty
Try: Sefo Kautai 13'; Laghlan McWhannell 20'; Liam Coombes-Fabling 63'; Luke Jacobson 74'; Patrick McCurran 78'; Con: Damian McKenzie (5/5) 14', 21', 64', 75', 80'	Report	Try: Te Toiroa Tahuriorangi 9'; Kurt Eklund 24'; Leroy Carter (2) 34', 45'; Joey Walton 48'; Con: Kaleb Trask (3/4) 10', 25', 47'; Pen: Kaleb Trask (1/1) 5'; Cards: Haereiti Hetet (yellow card) 73'

Waikato Stadium, Hamilton
Referee: Paul Williams

== Play-offs ==
Quarter-finals
Wellington	28
Hawke's Bay	21
North Harbour	18
Auckland	21
Waikato	27
Bay of Plenty	34
Canterbury	23
Northland	16

Semi-finals
Wellington	54
Auckland	19
Bay of Plenty	10
Canterbury	24

Final
Wellington	26
Canterbury	18

=== Quarter-finals ===
7 October 2022
19:05 NZST

North Harbour	18–21	Auckland
Try: Bryn Gatland 36'; Tevita Li 40'; Con: Bryn Gatland (1/2) 37'; Pen: Bryn Gatland (1/2) 20'; Henry Taefu (0/1); Shaun Stevenson (1/1) 70'	Report	Try: Akira Ioane 52'; Terrell Peita 74'; Con: Harry Plummer (1/2) 54'; Pen: Harry Plummer (3/4) 14', 32', 80+2', Drop: Harry Plummer (0/1); Simon Hickey (0/1); Cards: Tomas Aoake (yellow card) 37'; Roger Tuivasa-Sheck (yellow card) 48'

North Harbour Stadium, Albany
Referee: Paul Williams

8 October 2022
14:05 NZST

Wellington	28–21	Hawke's Bay
Try: Ruben Love 6'; Penalty try 11'; Richard Judd 76'; Con: Jackson Garden-Bachop (1/2) 77'; Pen: Jackson Garden-Bachop (2/2) 4', 80'; Drop: Jackson Garden-Bachop (1/1) 39'	Report	Try: Brad Weber53'; Lincoln McClutchie 65'; Josh Kaifa 71'; Con: Lincoln McClutchie (3/3) 54', 66', 73'; Cards: Tyrone Thompson (yellow card) 11'

Wellington Regional Stadium, Wellington
Attendance: 3,088
Referee: Ben O'Keeffe

8 October 2022
16:35 NZST

Canterbury	23–16	Northland
Try: Tamaiti Williams 3'; Brodie McAlister 11'; Con: Fergus Burke (2/2) 4', 13'; Pen: Fergus Burke (3/3) 17', 42', 80'	Report	Try: Jonah Mau'u 48'; Con: Rivez Reihana (1/1) 49'; Pen: Rivez Reihana (1/1) 6'; Daniel Hawkins (2/2) 63', 76'; Cards: Blake Hohaia (yellow card) 10'

Rugby League Park, Christchurch
Referee: Angus Mabey

9 October 2022
14:05 NZST

Waikato	27–34	Bay of Plenty
Try: Laghlan McWhannell (2) 10', 34'; Bailyn Sullivan 80+2'; Con: Damian McKenzie (2/2) 11', 35'; Jack Lam (1/1) 80+3'; Pen: Damian McKenzie (2/3) 58', 64'	Report	Try: Naitoa Ah Kuoi (2) 28', 70'; Leroy Carter 72'; Con: Kaleb Trask (1/1) 29'; Wharenui Hawera (1/2) 74'; Pen: Kaleb Trask (1/2) 40+1'; Wharenui Hawera (4/4) 43', 49', 55', 79'; Drop: Wharenui Hawera (0/2)

Waikato Stadium, Hamilton
Referee: Brendon Pickerill

=== Semi-finals ===
14 October 2022
19:05 NZST

Wellington	54–19	Auckland
Try: Julian Savea 5'; Riley Higgins (2) 10', 76'; Asafo Aumua 26'; Jackson Garden-Bachop 33'; TJ Perenara 56'; Pepesana Patafilo 62'; Ruben Love 80'; Con: Jackson Garden-Bachop (5/6) 11', 27', 35', 57', 63'; Aidan Morgan (2/2) 78', 80+1'	Report	Try: Niko Jones 38'; Jackson Pugh 41'; Patrick Tuipulotu 68'; Con: Harry Plummer (2/3) 39', 42'

Wellington Regional Stadium, Wellington
Attendance: 4,189
Referee: James Doleman

15 October 2022
19:05 NZST

Canterbury	24–10	Bay of Plenty
Try: Fergus Burke (2) 34', 57'; Con: Fergus Burke (1/2) 58'; Pen: Fergus Burke (4/4) 23', 25', 70', 73'	Report	Try: Naitoa Ah Kuoi 52'; Con: Wharenui Hawera (1/1) 53'; Pen: Wharenui Hawera (1/3) 14'

Rugby League Park, Christchurch
Referee: Ben O'Keeffe

=== Final ===
22 October 2022
19:05 NZST

Canterbury	18–26	Wellington
Try: Manasa Mataele 22'; Ngane Punivai 77'; Con: Fergus Burke (1/2) 23'; Pen: Fergus Burke (2/3) 9', 31'	Report	Try: Ruben Love 16'; Asafo Aumua 36'; Con: Jackson Garden-Bachop (2/2) 17', 37'; Pen: Jackson Garden-Bachop (3/4) 15', 45', 50'; Aidan Morgan (0/2); Ruben Love (1/1) 80'; Drop: Aidan Morgan (0/1)

Rugby League Park, Christchurch
Referee: Brendon Pickerill

FB	15	Chay Fihaki
RW	14	Manasa Mataele	(substituted off) 40'
OC	13	Dallas McLeod	(substituted off) 66'
IC	12	Rameka Poihipi
LW	11	George Bridge
FH	10	Fergus Burke
SH	9	Willi Heinz	(substituted off) 55'
N8	8	Billy Harmon (c)
OF	7	Tom Christie
BF	6	Corey Kellow	(substituted off) 50'
RL	5	Zach Gallagher
LL	4	Dominic Gardiner	(substituted off) 50'
TP	3	Owen Franks	(substituted off) 41'
HK	2	Brodie McAlister	(substituted off) 35'	(substituted on) 41'
LP	1	Finlay Brewis	(substituted off) 53'
Replacements:
HK	16	George Bell	(substituted on) 35'	(substituted off) 41'
PR	17	Daniel Lienert-Brown	(substituted on) 53'
PR	18	Tamaiti Williams	(substituted on) 41'
LK	19	Luke Romano	(substituted on) 50'
FL	20	Reed Prinsep	(substituted on) 50'
SH	21	Mitchell Drummond	(substituted on) 55'
CE	22	Isaiah Punivai	(substituted on) 66'
WG	23	Ngane Punivai	(substituted on) 40'

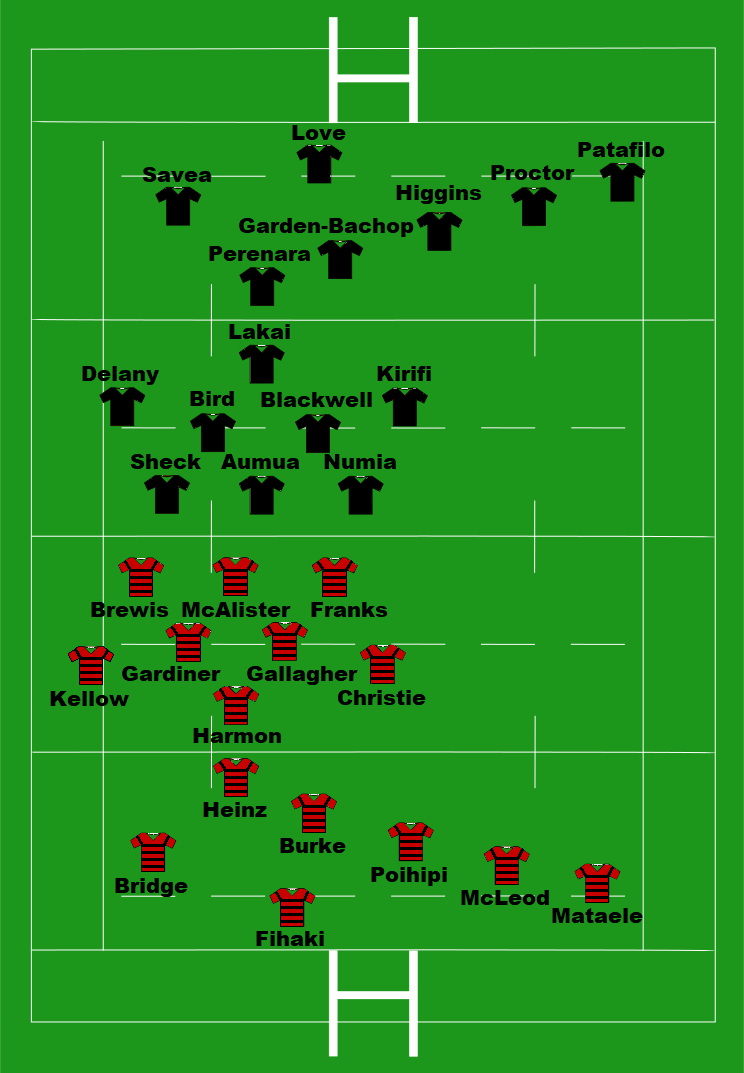

FB	15	Ruben Love
RW	14	Julian Savea			(substituted off) 78'
OC	13	Billy Proctor
IC	12	Riley Higgins
LW	11	Pepesana Patafilo		(substituted off) 69'
FH	10	Jackson Garden-Bachop		(substituted off) 57'
SH	9	TJ Perenara		(substituted off) 66'	(substituted on) 78'
N8	8	Peter Lakai
OF	7	Du'Plessis Kirifi (c)
BF	6	Caleb Delany		(substituted off) 61'
RL	5	Dominic Bird		(substituted off) 76'
LL	4	James Blackwell
TP	3	PJ Sheck		(substituted off) 66'
HK	2	Asafo Aumua		(substituted off) 80'
LP	1	Xavier Numia		(substituted off) 76'
Replacements:
HK	16	James O'Reilly		(substituted on) 80'
PR	17	Siale Lauaki		(substituted on) 66'
PR	18	Tietie Tuimauga		(substituted on) 76'
LK	19	Taine Plumtree		(substituted on) 76'
FL	20	Keelan Whitman		(substituted on) 61'
SH	21	Richard Judd	(yellow card) 77'	(substituted on) 66'
FH	22	Aidan Morgan		(substituted on) 57'
WG	23	Connor Garden-Bachop		(substituted on) 69'

== Statistics ==
=== Leading point scorers ===
No.	Player	Team	Points	Average	Details
1	Fergus Burke	Canterbury	147	12.25	6 T, 30 C, 19 P, 0 D
2	Bryn Gatland	North Harbour	139	12.64	4 T, 34 C, 17 P, 0 D
3	Damian McKenzie	Waikato	125	11.36	3 T, 25 C, 20 P, 0 D
4	Riley Hohepa	Counties Manukau	99	9.90	1 T, 23 C, 15 P, 1 D
5	Lincoln McClutchie	Hawke's Bay	97	10.78	3 T, 26 C, 10 P, 0 D
6	Kaleb Trask	Bay of Plenty	93	10.33	0 T, 21 C, 17 P, 0 D
7	Jackson Garden-Bachop	Wellington	92	8.36	1 T, 24 C, 12 P, 1 D
8	Harry Plummer	Auckland	86	7.82	1 T, 21 C, 13 P, 0 D
9	Cam Millar	Otago	75	8.33	0 T, 21 C, 11 P, 0 D
10	Rivez Reihana	Northland	72	6.55	1 T, 17 C, 11 P, 0 D

Source: The weekly reviews of the matches published on provincial.rugby (see "Report" in the individual match scoring stats).

=== Leading try scorers ===
No.	Player	Team	Tries	Average
1	Tevita Li	North Harbour	13	1.30
2	Macca Springer	Tasman	8	0.89
3	Emoni Narawa	Bay of Plenty	8	0.80
4	Brodie McAlister	Canterbury	7	0.88
5	Noah Hotham	Tasman	7	0.70
6	Naitoa Ah Kuoi	Bay of Plenty	7	0.64
7	Daniel Sinkinson	Waikato	7	0.64
8	Tyrone Thompson	Hawke's Bay	7	0.64
9	Asafo Aumua	Wellington	7	0.54
10	Kini Naholo	Taranaki	6	1.20

Source: The weekly reviews of the matches published on provincial.rugby (see "Report" in the individual match scoring stats).

=== Points by game ===
Team	1		2		3		4		5		6		7		8		9		10		Total		Average	
Auckland	36	26	45	18	24	23	17	21	35	17	22	23	15	30	30	27	20	38	38	24	282	247	28.20	24.70
Bay of Plenty	35	37	46	6	21	17	13	18	33	27	48	34	54	21	20	14	21	23	34	35	325	232	32.50	23.20
Canterbury	62	15	43	10	10	16	52	20	35	22	32	28	46	17	44	39	38	20	27	21	389	208	38.90	20.80
Counties Manukau	23	22	32	33	20	34	18	13	12	37	41	33	39	44	14	25	26	30	31	64	256	335	25.60	33.50
Hawke's Bay	32	32	33	32	13	18	43	17	25	23	28	32	69	24	12	19	14	20	25	17	294	234	29.40	23.40
Manawatu	15	62	18	45	14	64	17	43	6	53	26	36	33	41	24	34	35	54	24	41	212	473	21.20	47.30
North Harbour	26	36	64	14	35	27	23	25	22	35	37	12	34	48	48	21	35	19	66	8	390	245	39.00	24.50
Northland	13	11	10	16	15	6	32	19	23	22	17	46	21	48	17	52	23	21	41	24	212	265	21.20	26.50
Otago	22	23	25	19	18	13	37	32	17	35	27	33	26	32	27	20	54	35	21	27	274	269	27.40	26.90
Southland	20	27	23	24	32	37	19	32	28	41	24	69	24	54	21	54	30	26	8	66	229	430	22.90	43.00
Taranaki	11	13	6	46	16	10	25	31	6	21	27	36	34	24	25	14	19	35	24	38	193	270	19.30	27.00
Tasman	27	20	19	25	27	35	20	52	36	26	19	25	36	27	27	30	52	17	17	25	282	282	28.20	28.20
Waikato	32	32	16	10	34	20	53	6	21	6	30	15	54	24	20	27	6	34	35	34	301	208	30.10	20.80
Wellington	37	35	10	43	6	15	31	25	41	28	25	19	32	26	19	12	34	6	64	31	299	240	29.90	24.00

Source: Bunnings NPC Fixtures and Results 2022

=== Tries by game ===
Team	1		2		3		4		5		6		7		8		9		10		Total		Average	
Auckland	5	4	6	2	3	2	2	2	5	3	3	3	2	3	3	4	3	5	5	3	37	31	3.70	3.10
Bay of Plenty	4	6	6	0	2	2	2	0	4	3	6	4	8	3	3	2	2	3	5	5	42	28	4.20	2.80
Canterbury	9	2	6	1	2	1	7	3	4	3	4	3	6	2	6	5	5	3	4	3	53	26	5.30	2.60
Counties Manukau	2	3	4	5	2	4	0	2	2	5	6	5	5	6	2	3	4	4	5	10	32	47	3.20	4.70
Hawke's Bay	4	4	5	4	1	2	6	2	3	3	3	4	10	3	0	1	2	3	4	2	38	28	3.80	2.80
Manawatu	2	9	2	6	2	9	2	6	0	8	4	5	5	6	4	4	5	8	4	6	30	67	3.00	6.70
North Harbour	4	5	9	2	2	4	3	3	3	4	5	2	4	6	6	3	5	3	10	1	51	33	5.10	3.30
Northland	1	1	1	1	2	0	4	3	3	3	2	6	3	6	2	7	3	2	6	4	27	33	2.70	3.30
Otago	3	2	2	2	2	1	4	4	3	5	3	4	4	4	3	2	8	5	3	4	35	33	3.50	3.30
Southland	2	3	2	3	4	4	3	4	3	6	3	10	3	8	3	8	4	4	1	10	28	60	2.80	6.00
Taranaki	1	1	0	6	1	2	3	5	0	2	3	5	4	4	3	2	3	5	3	5	21	37	2.10	3.70
Tasman	3	2	2	2	4	2	3	7	5	4	1	3	5	3	4	3	7	2	2	4	36	32	3.60	3.20
Waikato	4	4	1	1	4	2	8	0	2	0	3	2	8	3	2	3	0	4	5	5	37	24	3.70	2.40
Wellington	6	4	1	6	0	2	5	3	6	3	3	1	4	4	1	0	4	0	10	5	40	28	4.00	2.80

For	Against

Source: The weekly reviews of the matches published on provincial.rugby (see "Report" in the individual match scoring stats).

=== Sanctions ===
Player	Team	Red	Yellow	Sent off match(es)
Daniel Hawkins	Northland	1	0	vs Southland
Niko Jones	Auckland	1	0	vs Canterbury
Hayden Michaels	Southland	1	0	vs Counties Manukau
Shaun Stevenson	North Harbour	0	2	vs Manawatu and Hawke's Bay
Connor Vest	Auckland	0	2	vs North Harbour and Otago
Harry Plummer	Auckland	0	2	vs Bay of Plenty and Tasman
TJ Perenara	Wellington	0	2	vs Canterbury and Hawke's Bay
Richard Judd	Wellington	0	2	vs Otago and Canterbury
Luke Jacobson	Waikato	0	1	vs Hawke's Bay
Nic Mayhew	North Harbour	0	1	vs Auckland
Hemopo Cunningham	Taranaki	0	1	vs Northland
Kegan Christian-Goss	Manawatu	0	1	vs Auckland
Sam Tuifua	Counties Manukau	0	1	vs Hawke's Bay
Ray Nu'u	Otago	0	1	vs Tasman
Josh Bekhuis	Southland	0	1	vs Auckland
Josh Hill	Otago	0	1	vs Hawke's Bay
Sevu Reece	Tasman	0	1	vs North Harbour
Tom Parsons	Hawke's Bay	0	1	vs Manawatu
Micaiah Torrance-Read	Manawatu	0	1	vs Hawke's Bay
Jordan Trainor	Auckland	0	1	vs Otago
Zane Kapeli	Bay of Plenty	0	1	vs Counties Manukau
Asafo Aumua	Wellington	0	1	vs Taranaki
Isaac Salmon	Tasman	0	1	vs Manawatu
Coree Te Whata-Colley	Northland	0	1	vs Auckland
Billy Proctor	Wellington	0	1	vs Southland
Solomone Funaki	Hawke's Bay	0	1	vs Canterbury
Rameka Poihipi	Canterbury	0	1	vs Hawke's Bay
Lotu Inisi	North Harbour	0	1	vs Counties Manukau
Ahsee Tuala	Counties Manukau	0	1	vs North Harbour
Cortez Ratima	Waikato	0	1	vs Auckland
Cameron Suafoa	North Harbour	0	1	vs Bay of Plenty
Nikora Broughton	Bay of Plenty	0	1	vs North Harbour
Taylor Haugh	Bay of Plenty	0	1	vs North Harbour
Sam Slade	Counties Manukau	0	1	vs Manawatu
Adam Brash	Counties Manukau	0	1	vs Manawatu
Sam Gilbert	Otago	0	1	vs Wellington
Dominic Bird	Wellington	0	1	vs Otago
Matt Matich	Northland	0	1	vs Canterbury
Mitch Jacobson	Waikato	0	1	vs Southland
Viliami Fine	Southland	0	1	vs Waikato
Max Hicks	Tasman	0	1	vs Auckland
Joe Apikotoa	Hawke's Bay	0	1	vs Wellington
Aidan Ross	Bay of Plenty	0	1	vs Southland
Naitoa Ah Kuoi	Bay of Plenty	0	1	vs Southland
Blake Gibson	Auckland	0	1	vs Canterbury
Taufa Funaki	Auckland	0	1	vs Canterbury
Heremaia Murray	Northland	0	1	vs Tasman
Pita Anae Ah-Sue	Waikato	0	1	vs Wellington
Robbie Robinson	Southland	0	1	vs North Harbour
Siaosi Nginingini	North Harbour	0	1	vs Southland
Alex McRobbie	Counties Manukau	0	1	vs Wellington
Haereiti Hetet	Bay of Plenty	0	1	vs Waikato
Tomas Aoake	Auckland	0	1	vs North Harbour
Roger Tuivasa-Sheck	Auckland	0	1	vs North Harbour
Tyrone Thompson	Hawke's Bay	0	1	vs Wellington
Blake Hohaia	Northland	0	1	vs Canterbury

== Ranfurly Shield ==
=== Pre-season challenges ===
29 June 2022
16:35 NZST

Hawke's Bay	38–20	South Canterbury
Try: Sam Smith 12'; Kienan Higgins 21'; Connor McLeod (2) 37', 57'; Caleb Makene 41'; Paoraian Manuel-Harman 64'; Con: Lincoln McClutchie (3/5) 12', 21', 58'; Sheridan Rangihuna (1/1) 66'	Preview; Report	Try: Vaka Taelega 17'; Paula Fifita 72'; Theo Davidson 80+1'; Con: Sam Briggs (0/1); William Wright (1/1) 74'; Nick Strachan (0/1); Pen: Sam Briggs (1/1) 15'

McLean Park, Napier
Referee: Marcus Playle

30 July 2022
15:05 NZST

Hawke's Bay	95–22	Poverty Bay
Try: Tupou Ma'afu Afungia (3) 2', 29', 33'; Anzelo Tuitavuki (2) 4', 18'; Isaia Walker-Leawere 10'; Ollie Sapsford 20'; Brad Weber 40'; Harry Godfrey 49'; Caleb Makene (2) 55', 68'; Kienan Higgins 63'; Bryn Evans 74'; Josh Gimblett 76'; Sam Smith 80'; Con: Harry Godfrey (10/14) 2', 4', 11', 19', 21', 30', 40+1', 50', 69', 74'; Danny Toala (0/1)	Preview; Report	Try: Hunter Mokomoko 12'; Mitchell Purvis (2) 25', 80+1'; Ted Walters 43'; Con: Mitchell Purvis (0/3); Ricardo Patricio (1/1) 80+2'

McLean Park, Napier
Referee: Cameron Stone
