= All Blacks XV =

- Union: New Zealand Rugby Union
- Emblem: Silver-fern frond
- Coach: Jamie Joseph
- Captain: Dalton Papali'i
Team kit

First international
- (New Zealand) Junior All Blacks 23–19 Australia A (26 June 2005)

Largest win
- (New Zealand) Junior All Blacks 57–8 Fiji (2 June 2007)

Official website
- www.allblacks.com

The All Blacks XV is the second national rugby union team of New Zealand, after the All Blacks. New Zealand's second national team has had numerous names in its history: Junior All Blacks, New Zealand XV, New Zealand A, New Zealand B, All Blacks XV.

Matches played as the 'All Blacks XV' are not test matches and are usually against a touring side or, when on tour, against non-top tier rugby nations or club teams.

== History ==
The NZ Juniors (U23s), popularly known as the Junior All Blacks, had been active from 1958 to 1984 playing 7 international matches. They were disbanded in 1984 and replaced by a non-age restricted team called the New Zealand Emerging Players. The Emerging Players were active in 1985 and 1986 but only played internal tours in fixtures against New Zealand provincial sides. In 2006, the team was formally reintroduced and repurposed as the second national team when they competed in the inaugural Pacific Nations Cup.

In 1991 a New Zealand XV played both Romania and USSR in the 'test' fixtures of their tours to New Zealand.

In 1991 a New Zealand B team played Australia B during their Tour to Australia.

In 1992 a New Zealand XV team beat England B in two matches during the tourists 8-game tour.

In 1998 a New Zealand A team lost 10–18 to the England touring side in Hamilton.

In 2005 a New Zealand A team played two matches against Australia A.

In 2006, the second team was re-branded as the Junior All Blacks, inheriting the nickname of the previous New Zealand U23 team. This second XV participated in the 2006, 2007 and 2009 Pacific Nations Cup. In 2008 the Maori All Blacks played in this tournament. The Junior All Blacks were put into a hiatus shortly after the 2009 tournament. The side was then reinstated in 2019, but their first set of games was delayed due to the COVID-19 pandemic.

In 2022, the team was re-branded once again as the All Blacks XV for matches against Ireland A and the Barbarians. The All Blacks XV was launched as NZR's next senior national representative team after the All Blacks, as a critical high-performance pathway to the All Blacks. As the next senior national representative side, the All Blacks XV will have the same high expectations as the other teams in Black. The All Blacks XV follows in the footsteps of similar teams which have assembled throughout New Zealand rugby's history, including the Junior All Blacks, New Zealand A and Emerging Players.

== Results ==
Below is a summary of All Blacks XV match results (updated 1 November 2025):

Opponent	Played	Won	Lost	Drawn	Win%	For	Aga	Diff
Australia A	3	3	0	0	100%	107	50	+57
Barbarians	2	1	1	0	50%	64	54	+10
England A	0	0	0	0	0%	0	0	0
Fiji	3	3	0	0	100%	137	42	+95
Georgia	1	1	0	0	100%	31	13	+18
Ireland A	1	1	0	0	100%	47	19	+28
Italy	1	1	0	0	100%	30	13	+17
Japan	8	7	1	0	87.5%	317	94	+223
Japan XV	1	1	0	0	100%	38	6	+32
Munster	1	1	0	0	100%	38	24	+14
Romania	1	0	0	1	0%	10	10	+0
Samoa	3	3	0	0	100%	104	38	+66
Tonga	3	3	0	0	100%	124	48	+76
Uruguay	0	0	0	0	0%	0	0	0
Total	28	25	2	1	89.29%	1,047	411	+636

== Current squad ==
On October 14, The All Blacks XV announced their squad for the 2025 Northern Tour with matches against the Barbarians, England A and Uruguay.

Players in bold are players capped by the senior New Zealand national team, the All Blacks.

Head Coach: (New Zealand) Jamie Joseph

Squad updated to: 1 November 2025

Forwards
Player	Position	Franchise / province
**Brodie McAlister**	Hooker	Chiefs / Canterbury
Jack Taylor	Hooker	Highlanders / Southland
Bradley Slater	Hooker	Chiefs / Taranaki
George Dyer	Prop	Chiefs / Waikato
Josh Fusitua	Prop	Blues / Auckland
Benet Kumeroa	Prop	Chiefs / Bay of Plenty
Siale Lauaki	Prop	Hurricanes / Wellington
Xavier Numia	Prop	Hurricanes / Wellington
Josh Beehre	Lock	Blues / Auckland
Caleb Delany	Lock	Hurricanes / Wellington
Jamie Hannah	Lock	Crusaders / Canterbury
Kaylum Boshier	Loose forward	Chiefs / Taranaki
Devan Flanders	Loose forward	Hurricanes / Hawke's Bay
TK Howden	Loose forward	Highlanders / Manawatu
**Christian Lio-Willie**	Loose forward	Crusaders / Otago
**Dalton Papali'i**	Loose forward	Blues / Counties Manukau
Sean Withy	Loose forward	Highlanders / Southland

Backs
Player	Position	Franchise / province
**Folau Fakatava**	Half-back	Highlanders / Hawke's Bay
**Kyle Preston**	Half-back	Crusaders / Wellington
Xavier Roe	Half-back	Chiefs / Waikato
Josh Jacomb	First five-eighth	Chiefs / Taranaki
Rivez Reihana	First five-eighth	Crusaders / Northland
**Braydon Ennor**	Centre	Crusaders / Canterbury
**David Havili**	Centre	Crusaders / Tasman
**Dallas McLeod**	Centre	Crusaders / Canterbury
Daniel Rona	Centre	Chiefs / Taranaki
Chay Fihaki	Wing	Crusaders / Canterbury
Etene Nanai-Seturo	Wing	Chiefs / Counties Manukau
Caleb Tangitau	Wing	Highlanders / Auckland
Jacob Ratumaitavuki-Kneepkens	Full-back	Highlanders / Taranaki

- Naitoa Ah Kuoi and Isaia Walker-Leawere were initially named in the All Blacks XV squad, but were later replaced in the squad by Caleb Delany and Jamie Hannah.

== See also ==
- New Zealand national schoolboy rugby union team
- New Zealand national under-19 rugby union team
- New Zealand national under-20 rugby union team
- New Zealand national under-21 rugby union team
- Maori All Blacks
- All Blacks
