= Tyrone Thompson (rugby) =

New Zealand rugby union and rugby league player

- Born: 28 May 2000 (age 26) Muriwai, New Zealand
- Height: 186 cm (6 ft 1 in)
- Weight: 111 kg (245 lb; 17 st 7 lb)
- School: Napier Boys' High School
- Notable relative: Leo Thompson (twin brother)

Rugby union career
- Position: Hooker
- Current team: Chiefs, Hawke's Bay
Senior career
Years	Team	Apps	(Points)
2020–2021	Wellington	18	(30)
2022–2024, 2026–	Chiefs	31	(40)
2022–2024, 2026–	Hawke's Bay	29	(85)
- Correct as of 1 July 2026
International career
Years	Team	Apps	(Points)
2022–2024	Māori All Blacks	4	(5)
2022	All Blacks XV	3	(0)
- Correct as of 1 July 2026
- Rugby league career

Playing information
- Position: Prop
Club
Years	Team	Pld	T	G	FG	P
2025	Newcastle Knights	3	0	0	0	0
- Source: As of 25 April 2025

Tyrone Thompson (born 28 May 2000) is a New Zealand rugby union and rugby league player, who plays as a hooker for the Chiefs in Super Rugby and Hawke's Bay in New Zealand's domestic National Provincial Championship competition.

Internationally, he has played for the Māori All Blacks and All Blacks XV.

Thompson played one season of rugby league for the Newcastle Knights in the National Rugby League in 2025.

== Early life and career ==
Tyrone Thompson hails from Muriwai, in the Gisborne District in the northeastern corner of New Zealand's North Island. At the age of 5, he moved with his family to Napier in Hawke's Bay.

Tyrone and his twin brother Leo attended Napier Boys' High School, where they played first XV rugby together. He captained his team to a Hurricanes Cup 1st XV title, beating the defending champions Hastings Boys' High School 20 - 10 at McLean Park, Napier on 1 September 2018. Eight days later, they played in the National Top 4 Final, which Napier Boys' narrowly lost 28 - 31 to St Peter's College, Auckland. Thompson scored a try in that final.

Thompson attended a Hurricanes Under 17 Development Camp in 2017 and a Hurricanes U18 Camp, a year later.

After finishing high school, Thompson and his brother signed a contract with the Wellington Rugby Academy and moved to Wellington. There, he played club rugby for Marist St Pats, the club his father, uncle and cousins have also played for.

Both Thompson brothers represented Wellington at the Jock Hobbs Memorial National Under 19 Tournament in 2019, finishing the tournament in third place.

== Senior career ==
=== Rugby ===
On 28 August 2020, Thompson was named in the Wellington squad for the 2020 Mitre 10 Cup. He made his debut for the Lions - off the bench - against Waikato on 12 September 2020. He earned his first start and scored a brilliant 50m try - his first in the National Provincial Championship - on 25 September 2020 against Bay of Plenty.

Since his arrival in Wellington, Thompson played several games for the Hurricanes U20 team and the Hurricanes Hunters (Development) squad.

On 22 November 2021, Thompson was named in the Chiefs squad for the 2022 Super Rugby Pacific season. He made his debut for the franchise (from the reserves bench) on 19 March 2022 against Moana Pasifika and scored a try on debut.

Also on 19 March 2022, the Hawke's Bay Rugby Union announced that Thompson had signed with the Union and would be joining the Hawke's Bay Magpies for the next two National Provincial Championship seasons. He made his debut for the province – via the bench – on 6 August 2022 against Waikato and scored his first try for the Magpies on 12 August 2022 in a successful Ranfurly Shield defence against Counties Manukau.

After a one-year stint in rugby league in 2025, Thompson reversed his code switch and returned to rugby union. The Chiefs announced the signing of Thompson on 29 October 2025 ahead of the 2026 Super Rugby Pacific season. In June 2026, the Hawke's Bay Rugby Union announced that Thompson would also be returning to the Magpies for the 2026 and 2027 NPC seasons.

=== League ===
On 31 October 2024, NRL team Newcastle Knights announced the signing of Thompson on a National Rugby League Development contract. He would be joining his brother Leo Thompson at the club for the 2025 season. He made his NRL debut for Newcastle on 13 April 2025 in their round 6 game against Wests Tigers. In August 2025, it was confirmed that Thompson would exit the club at the end of the season.

== International career ==
In 2018, after his last year at Napier Boys' High School, Thompson was named in the New Zealand Secondary Schools team for a three-match international series in Australia. He played in all three games, including a 24 - 12 victory over Australian Schools.

A year later, both Thompson and his twin brother Leo - who are of Ngāi Tāmanuhiri and Ngāti Rangiwewehi descent - were selected to play for the first ever New Zealand Māori Under 20 team in a match against Fiji. The NZ Māori Under 20 team won the game 48 to 31.

Late 2019 and early 2020, Thompson was invited to attend the New Zealand Under 20 trial and development camps in preparation of the 2020 Oceania Rugby Under 20 Championship and World Rugby U20 Championship. Unfortunately, Thompson missed out on playing for the New Zealand Under 20 team, because these tournaments were cancelled due to the COVID-19 pandemic.

In June 2022, Thompson was – for the first time – named in the Māori All Blacks squad to take on Ireland on their New Zealand tour. He made his debut for the side on 29 June 2022, when the Māori All Blacks beat Ireland 32–17 in Hamilton.

On 26 October 2022, after an outstanding NPC season playing for Hawke's Bay, Thompson was called into the All Blacks XV squad that was named earlier that month for two matches against Ireland A and the Barbarians during their Northern Tour. He made his debut for the side – via the bench – on 4 November 2022 against Ireland A. The All Blacks XV won the game 47–19.
