= Chase Tiatia =

New Zealand rugby union player

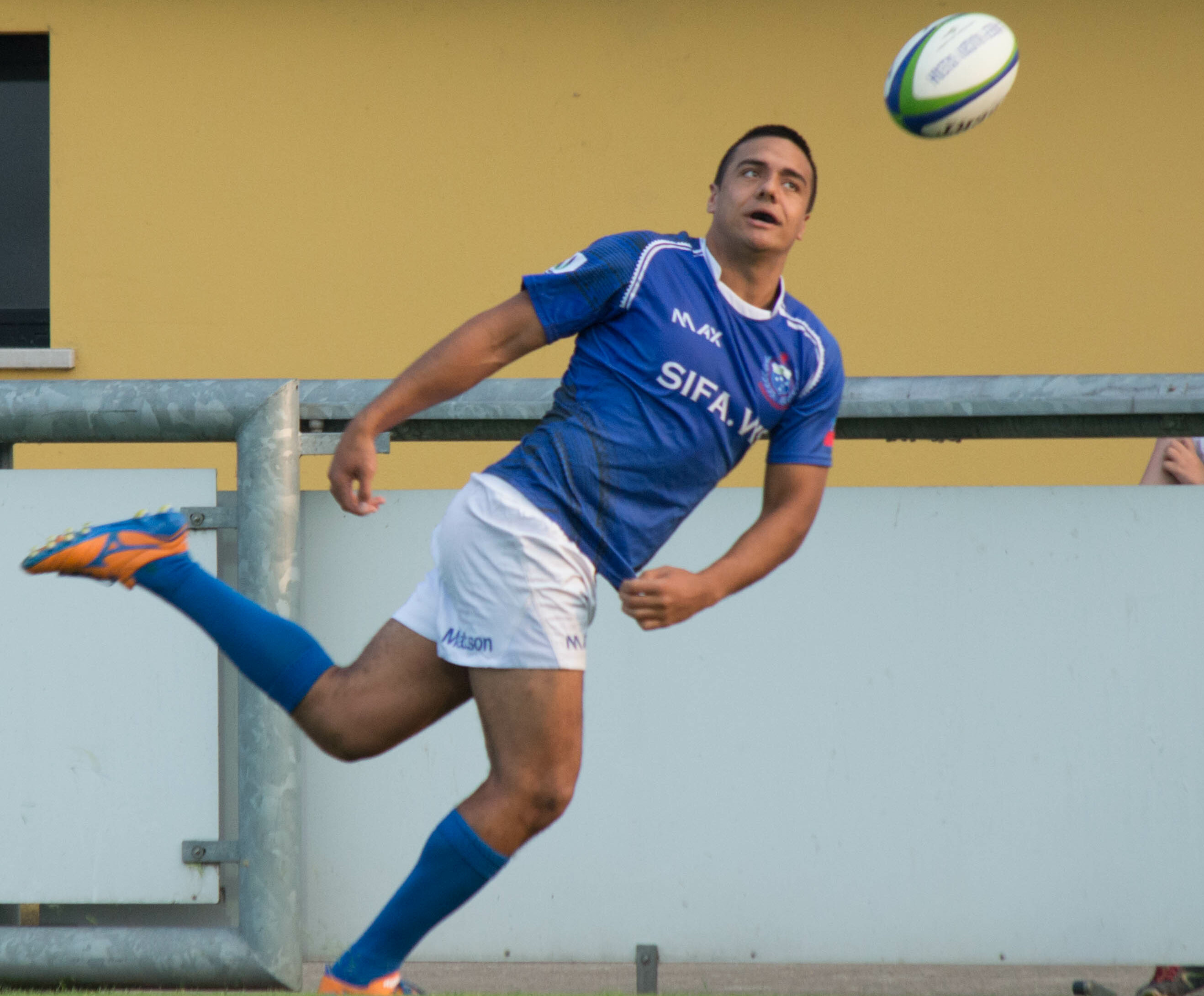
- Tiatia at the 2015 World Rugby Under 20 Championship
- Full name: Chase Jackson Tiatia
- Born: 14 October 1995 (age 31) Lower Hutt, New Zealand
- Height: 181 cm (5 ft 11 in)
- Weight: 93 kg (205 lb; 14 st 9 lb)
- School: St. Patrick's College Silverstream

Rugby union career
- Position(s): Fullback, wing, midfield back, flyhalf,
- Current team: Secom Rugguts
Senior career
Years	Team	Apps	(Points)
2014	Wellington	3	(0)
2015–2021	Bay of Plenty	61	(110)
2017, 2021–2022	Chiefs	14	(20)
2019–2020	Hurricanes	16	(17)
2022–2023	Hawke's Bay	21	(43)
2023–2024	Western Force	27	(30)
2024-	Secom Rugguts	30	(158)
- Correct as of 1 August 2024
International career
Years	Team	Apps	(Points)
2015	Samoa U20	5	(5)
- Correct as of 6 June 2022

Chase Tiatia (born 14 October 1995) is a rugby union player, who most recently played as a utility back for Hawke's Bay in New Zealand's domestic National Provincial Championship competition and the Western Force in Super Rugby. He was born and raised in New Zealand, but is eligible to represent Manu Samoa internationally due to his Samoan heritage.

== Early career ==
Born in Lower Hutt, Tiatia initially attended Hutt Valley High School before moving to St. Patrick's College Silverstream for his final 3 years of schooling between 2010 and 2013. While at St. Patrick's, he played first XV rugby and after graduation, he moved on to represent Wellington at under-19 level, helping them to win the first ever Jock Hobbs Memorial National Under-19 tournament in 2014. During his time in Wellington, he made a name for himself turning out for Hutt Old Boys-Marist in the Jubilee Cup Premier Division, Wellington's top club competition, where he finished as leading try scorer in 2014.

== Senior career ==
Tiatia got his first chance at provincial level with the Wellington Lions in 2014. It proved to be a difficult environment for a 19-year-old to get his first taste of rugby in, as the Lions – generally one of the competitions strongest sides – were relegated from the Premiership down to the Championship. Initially held back by a broken thumb, he went on to make 3 appearances during the campaign and was named as Wellington's most promising player, before heading north to join the Bay of Plenty Steamers for the 2015 ITM Cup.

In Rotorua, Tiatia was reunited with former Wellington under-19s coach Clayton McMillan, now head coach of the Steamers. The move proved to be a fruitful one as he played in all 11 of Bay of Plenty's games in 2015 and netted 4 tries, which saw him win his province's rookie of the year and back of the year awards. An elbow injury restricted him to just 3 appearances in 2016 as the Steamers reached the Championship semi-finals before losing to Otago.

After seven seasons playing for Bay of Plenty, Tiatia decided to move. On 29 June 2022, the Hawke's Bay Rugby Union announced that Tiatia had signed with the Hawke's Bay Magpies for the 2022 Bunnings NPC season. He made his debut for the province on 6 August 2022 against Waikato.

== Super Rugby ==
Tiatia's excellent domestic form for the Bay of Plenty in 2015 brought him to the attention of New Zealand's Super Rugby franchises and he was subsequently named in the Chiefs squad for the 2016 Super Rugby season. As a young back in a star studded line up, Tiatia's first season at Super Rugby level was largely one of learning and he didn't get on the field at all in 2016, with his year being ended early with an elbow injury. Despite this, head coach Dave Rennie retained him in the squad for 2017.

== International career ==
Although born and raised in New Zealand, internationally Tiatia elected to represent the land of his ancestors, Samoa, at under 20 level. He was a member of their under-20 side which participated in the 2015 World Rugby Under 20 Championship where he scored 1 try in 5 appearances.
