= Reon Paul =

New Zealand rugby union player

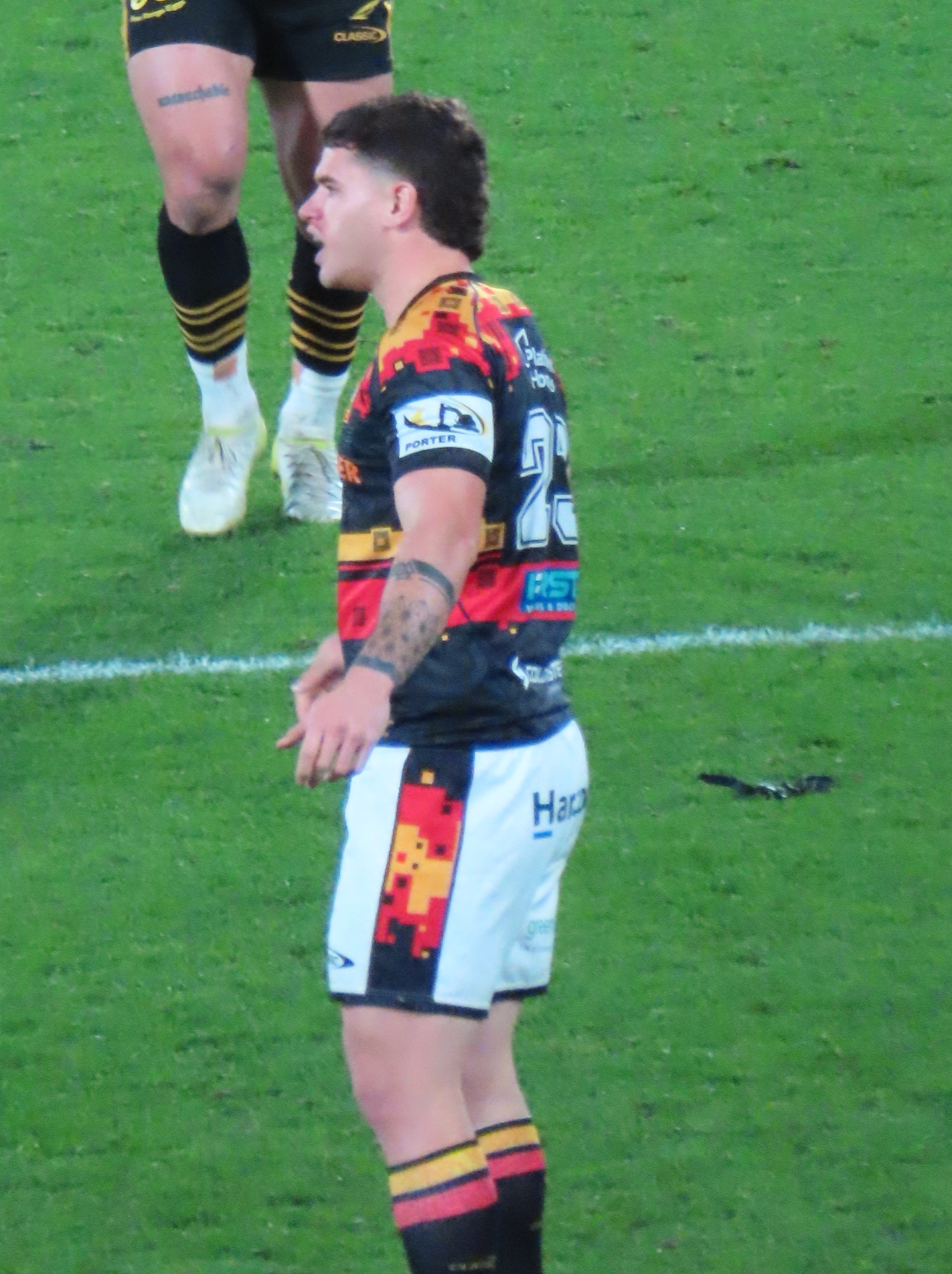
- Paul with the Chiefs in the 2026 Super Rugby final
- Born: 17 August 2001 (age 25) New Zealand
- Height: 186 cm (6 ft 1 in)
- School: Rongotai College
- Notable relative: TJ Perenara (uncle)

Rugby union career
- Position(s): Centre, Wing
- Current team: JR East Green Warriors, Bay of Plenty
Senior career
Years	Team	Apps	(Points)
2023–	Bay of Plenty	20	(20)
2025	Blues	0	(0)
2026	Chiefs	4	(5)
2026–	JR East Green Warriors		
- Correct as of 9 December 2024
International career
Years	Team	Apps	(Points)
2026–	Māori All Blacks	1	(0)

Reon Paul (born 17 August 2001) is a New Zealand rugby union player, who plays for the Blues and Bay of Plenty. His preferred position is centre or wing.

== Early career ==
Paul attended Rongotai College. He came through the Wellington academy and played his club rugby for Norths. He is the nephew of All Black TJ Perenara.

== Professional career ==
Paul has represented Bay of Plenty in the National Provincial Championship since 2023, being named in their full squad for the 2024 Bunnings NPC. He was named in the Blues squad for the 2025 Super Rugby Pacific season in November 2024.
