= Tauranga Domain =

Sports venue in Tauranga, New Zealand

Coordinates: 37°40′46″S 176°9′55″E

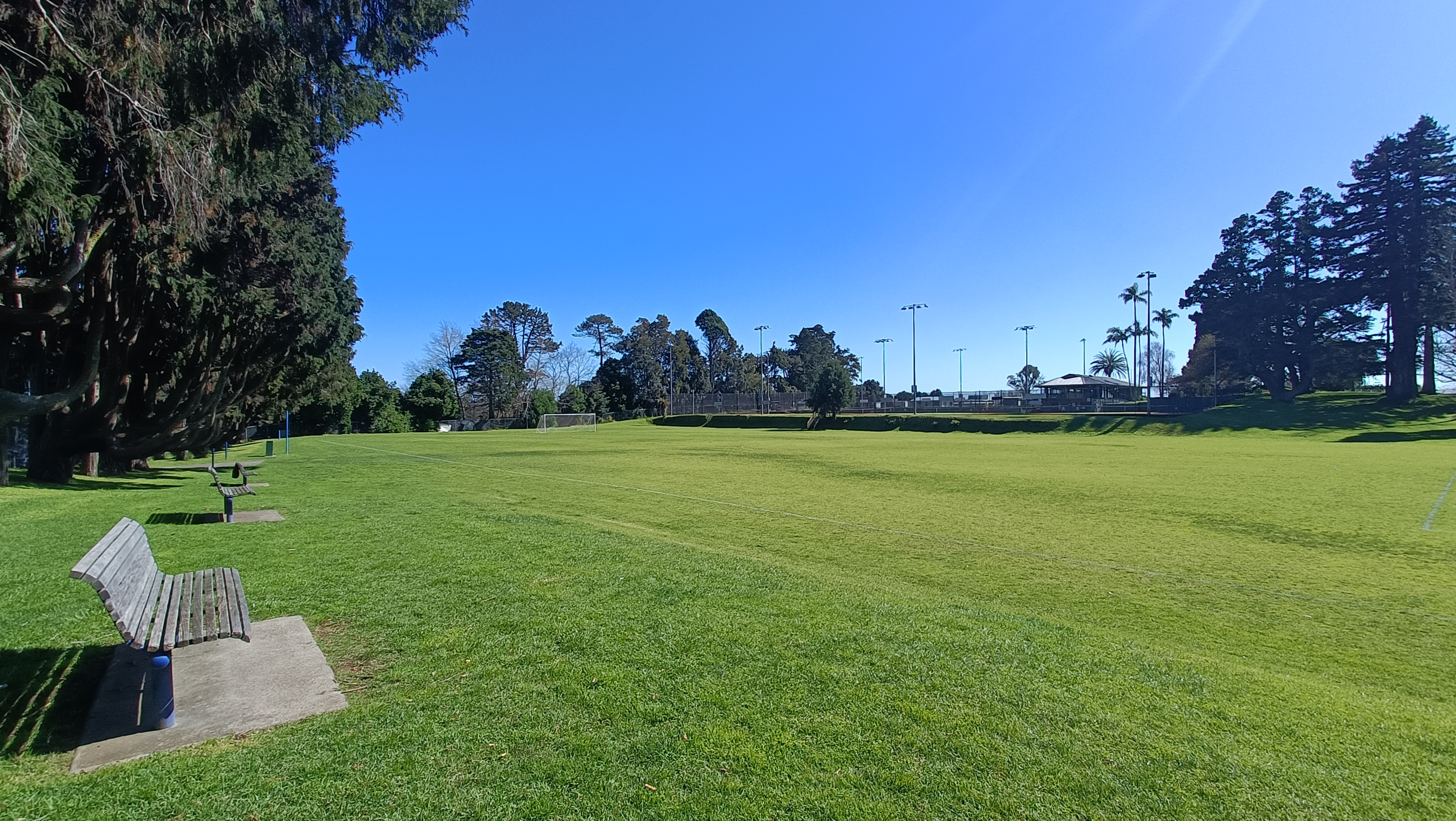
- Interactive map of Tauranga Domain
- Location: Cameron Rd, Tauranga, New Zealand
- Capacity: Rugby: 5,000

Tenant
- Bay of Plenty Rugby Union

Tauranga Domain is a park and sports stadium in Tauranga, New Zealand. It is used mainly for rugby union matches and serves as a home ground for the Bay of Plenty Rugby Union.

The origins of the park go back to 1873, when Tauranga residents applied to the Native Minister for a domain to be set aside. Five years later, the park was extended to the south. In 1881, the northern part was set aside for a secondary school. War memorial gates commemorate local men who died in World War I, and the gates are registered with Heritage New Zealand as a Category II item.

The park hosted its first National Provincial Championship game in 2015. Bay of Plenty lost to the visiting Waikato team by 43–10.

It also hosted host two more games in the 2016 Mitre 10 Cup. One against Taranaki and the other against Otago.

== Bay of Plenty matches (men and women) ==
List of Bay of Plenty Steamers and Volcanic matches played at Tauranga Domain.

Date	Result	Attendance	Notes
30 August 2015	Waikato 43; Bay of Plenty 0	2,870	Women's Provincial Championship
30 August 2015	Waikato 43; Bay of Plenty 10	4,860	National Provincial Championship
20 August 2016	Taranaki 30; Bay of Plenty 22	Unknown	Mitre 10 Cup
4 September 2016	Otago 33; Bay of Plenty 32	Unknown	Mitre 10 Cup
