= Fergus Burke =

Scotland international rugby union player

- Born: 3 September 1999 (age 27) Gisborne, New Zealand
- Height: 189 cm (6 ft 2 in)
- Weight: 95 kg (209 lb; 14 st 13 lb)
- School: St Paul's Collegiate School
- University: University of Canterbury

Rugby union career
- Position(s): Fly-half, Full-back
- Current team: Saracens
Senior career
Years	Team	Apps	(Points)
2019–2024	Canterbury	37	(389)
2024–	Saracens	21	(122)
- Correct as of 12 July 2025
Super Rugby
Years	Team	Apps	(Points)
2020–2024	Crusaders	42	(134)
- Correct as of 12 July 2025
International career
Years	Team	Apps	(Points)
2019	New Zealand U20	6	(26)
2024	Barbarians	1	(0)
2025–	Scotland	6	(28)
2026	Scotland 'A'	1	(0)
- Correct as of 18 November 2026

Fergus Burke (born 3 September 1999) is a Scotland international rugby union player, currently playing for Premiership Rugby club Saracens in England, and previously for Super Rugby franchise Crusaders, and National Provincial Championship team Canterbury. Born in New Zealand, he represents Scotland at international level after qualifying on ancestry grounds.

== Early life ==
Burke was born in Gisborne, New Zealand, to an English mother, Julie, and a New Zealand father, Richard. He has one sibling, an older sister named Georgia. He began playing rugby union at the age of five, but focused on playing football for much of his childhood, before returning to rugby in his teenage years, when he attended St Paul's Collegiate School in Hamilton. Playing primarily as a fly-half, he featured in his school's first team for several seasons, competing in the Central North Island High School Championship. He won the title in 2016, after scoring half of his team's points in the final.

After high school, Burke was selected for the Chiefs under-18 team. However, he was spotted during a pre-season training camp by the Crusaders, who recruited him into their academy. He then moved to Canterbury where, in addition to rugby training, he studied for a business degree at the University of Canterbury. He initially played for the Crusaders under-18s team, followed by the Canterbury under-19s team.

== Club career ==
=== New Zealand ===
In 2019, Burke began training with the Crusaders professional squad, before being named to the Canterbury provincial senior squad for the National Provincial Championship (NPC). He made his NPC debut on 10 August 2019, against Waikato. In total, he played 10 games in his first NPC season, with two starts.

Following his provincial debut, Burke was selected by the Crusaders to play in the 2020 Super Rugby season, operating as the third-choice fly-half behind Richie Mo'unga and Brett Cameron. He made his Super Rugby debut on 14 March 2020, coming on as a substitute against Japanese franchise Sunwolves, and scored nine points, including a try. This was his only game with the Crusaders in 2020, as the competition was suspended shortly afterwards, due to the COVID-19 pandemic, and he did not feature in Super Rugby Aotearoa. However, he appeared regularly for Canterbury in the NPC that year.

In the 2021 Super Rugby season, Burke established himself as the preferred understudy to Mo'unga with the Crusaders, and played a total of eight games. He made his first start for the franchise on 4 June 2021, against Western Force.

For the 2022 Super Rugby season, Burke took advantage of Mo'unga's absence at the beginning of the campaign to make several starting appearances. He played a total of nine games during the season, including five as a starter, although he did not participate in the knockout stages, as the team won the title. That same year, he also enjoyed a major role in Canterbury's run to the final of the 2022 NPC, finishing as the competition's top scorer, with 147 points. Subsequently, Burke extended his contract with the Crusaders until 2024.

Burke became a regular starter for the Crusaders in the 2023 Super Rugby season, although he played primarily at full-back, with Mo'unga continuing as the starting outside half. Across the year, Burke featured in a total of 17 matches for the franchise, which included involvements in all of the team's play-off matches, culminating in the 2023 Super Rugby Pacific final, which the Crusaders won 25–20 against the Chiefs to claim the title. He also recorded a further 10 starting appearances for Canterbury, almost all of which were in the fly-half position, in the 2023 NPC.

Prior to the 2024 Super Rugby season, Burke had been expected to take over the starting fly-half berth at the Crusaders, following Mo'unga's departure to Japan Rugby League One team Brave Lupus Tokyo. However, he was ruled out for several months by injury, after sustaining an Achilles tendon rupture in late 2023. As a consequence of the lengthy recovery time, Burke made just three full appearances for the franchise over that season.

=== Saracens ===
In 2024, Burke departed the Crusaders and moved to England to join Saracens on a long-term contract, replacing outgoing fly-half and captain Owen Farrell. Following his first appearances for the club in two pre-season fixtures, he made his competitive debut as a starter in the opening round of the 2024–25 Premiership, kicking 10 points at goal during a win against Gloucester on 21 September 2024. This was followed by a European Champions Cup debut on 7 December 2024, when Burke started and scored seven points in a pool stage victory against the Bulls.

== International career ==
Burke represented the New Zealand Barbarians Schoolboys in 2017. He notably faced the Māori All Blacks under-18s team.

In 2019, Burke was selected for the New Zealand under-20s, making two appearances at the Oceania Junior Championship. He was then chosen for the U20s squad to compete at the 2019 World Junior Championship in Argentina, and played four games at the tournament.

In June 2024, Burke was included in the Barbarians squad for an international friendly fixture against Fiji at Twickenham Stadium in London. He played the full 80 minutes of the match, helping the team to claim the Killik Cup with a 45–32 win.

Although he represented New Zealand at junior level, Burke also qualifies via ancestry, under the World Rugby selection eligibility criteria, to play for England or Scotland, through his Dover-born mother and Glasgow-born grandparents, respectively. Burke ultimately chose to represent Scotland and, on 15 January 2025, he received his first call-up to the Scottish senior squad, ahead of the 2025 Six Nations Championship.

After not featuring in the Six Nations, Burke was again included in the Scotland squad for the 2025 summer tour to the Southern Hemisphere. He made his first international appearance on 5 July 2025, coming on as a replacement in a non-cap match against the Māori All Blacks. His full test debut followed a week later, as he started at fly-half for Scotland against Fiji on 12 July 2025.

He played for Scotland 'A' on 6 February 2026 in their match against Italy XV.
