= Willi Heinz =

England international rugby union player

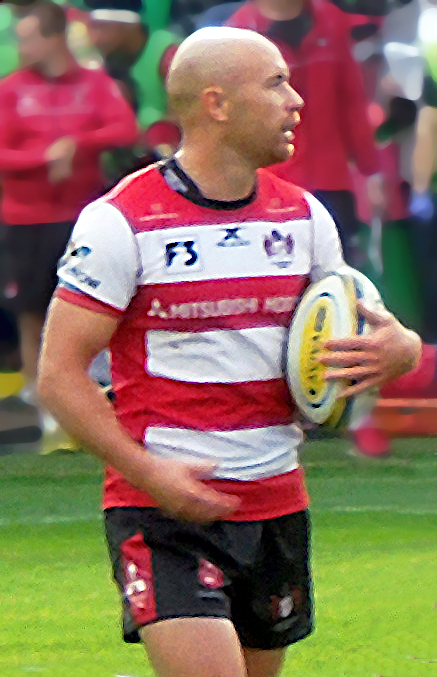
- Born: Willi Heinz; 24 November 1986 (age 39) Christchurch, New Zealand
- Height: 181.5 cm (5 ft 11 1/2 in)
- Weight: 88 kg (13 st 12 lb; 194 lb)
- School: Burnside High School

Rugby union career
- Position: Scrum-half
- Current team: Canterbury
Senior career
Years	Team	Apps	(Points)
2015–2021	Gloucester	100	(90)
2021–2022	Worcester Warriors	6	(10)
- Correct as of 29 May 2023
Provincial / State sides
Years	Team	Apps	(Points)
2009–2014, 2022–	Canterbury	82	(76)
- Correct as of 28 December 2024
Super Rugby
Years	Team	Apps	(Points)
2010–2014, 2023–2024	Crusaders	72	(37)
- Correct as of 28 December 2024
International career
Years	Team	Apps	(Points)
2019–2020	England	13	(0)
- Correct as of 29 May 2023

Willi Heinz (born 24 November 1986) is a professional rugby union player who currently plays as a scrum-half for Canterbury in the Bunnings NPC. He previously played for the Crusaders in Super Rugby and for Gloucester and Worcester Warriors in the Premiership. He has also represented England internationally.

== Early career ==
Heinz was born in Christchurch, where he attended Burnside High School. He played four years in the school's 1st XV rugby team.

Heinz represented Canterbury at under-18 and under-19 level.

== Senior career ==
After leaving school, he made his Air New Zealand Cup debut for Canterbury against Waikato in 2009 and debuted for the Crusaders during the 2010 Super 14 season.

On 24 February 2015, English Premiership club Gloucester Rugby announced his signing for the start of the 2015–16 season.

On 23 February 2021, after six seasons with Gloucester, Heinz signed with local rivals Worcester Warriors from the 2021–22 Premiership Rugby season. In March 2022, he left the club with immediate effect to return to New Zealand for family reasons.

After arriving back in New Zealand, Heinz played for his local club Burnside RFC and rejoined Canterbury for the 2022 Bunnings NPC.

On 26 October 2022, Heinz was named in the Crusaders squad for the 2023 Super Rugby Pacific season and became a Super Rugby champion with the franchise that season. On 29 May 2024, it was confirmed that the 2024 season was to be his last season with the Crusaders.

== International career ==
In May 2017, he was invited to a training camp with the senior England squad by Eddie Jones. Heinz qualifies to represent England through his grandmother.

In August 2019, he was selected as the starting scrum-half and vice-captain for England's first Rugby World Cup warm-up match against Wales. That game marked his international debut for the England national team. The next day, Heinz was named in England's 31-man squad for the 2019 Rugby World Cup.

== Honours ==
=== England ===
- Rugby World Cup
  - Runner-up: 2019
- Six Nations Championship
  - Champion: 2020

=== Crusaders ===
- Super Rugby
  - Champion: 2023

=== Canterbury ===
- Air New Zealand Cup
  - Champion: 2009
- ITM Cup
  - Champion: 2010
- ITM Cup Premiership Division
  - Champion: 2011, 2012, 2013
