= Campbell Parata =

New Zealand rugby union player

- Born: 1 February 2000 (age 26) Porirua, New Zealand
- Height: 182 cm (6 ft 0 in)
- Weight: 96 kg (15 st 2 lb; 212 lb)
- School: The Southport School

Rugby union career
- Position: First five-eighth
Senior career
Years	Team	Apps	(Points)
2021–2024	Tasman	15	(62)
2024	Force	0	(0)
- Correct as of 6 October 2024

Campbell T. A. Morgan-Parata (born 1 February 2000) is a New Zealand rugby union player. He has been a squad member of the Western Force in Super Rugby. His position is First five-eighth.

== Career ==
Born in Porirua, Parata moved to Australia at just 4 years of age where he was educated at The Southport School. He returned to New Zealand in 2019 and started playing club rugby in the Tasman Region for Waimea Old Boys. He was named in the Tasman Mako squad for the 2021 Bunnings NPC. Parata made his debut for Tasman against Bay of Plenty at Trafalgar Park in a non competition match, starting in the number 10 jersey in a 26–9 win for the Mako. The side went on to make the premiership final before losing 23–20 to Waikato. Parata was signed by Australian Super Rugby side the Western Force on a 3 year deal, he was only part of the development squad in 2022.
