= Tevita Mafileo =

New Zealand rugby union player

- Born: 4 February 1998 (age 28) Auckland, New Zealand
- Height: 188 cm (6 ft 2 in)
- Weight: 124 kg (273 lb; 19 st 7 lb)
- School: St. Kentigern College
- Notable relative: Sione Mafileo (brother)

Rugby union career
- Position: Prop
- Current team: Bay of Plenty, Hurricanes
Youth career
- Tauranga Sports
- North Shore RFC
- Bay of Plenty Academy
Senior career
Years	Team	Apps	(Points)
2019	Chiefs	7	(0)
2019–2022,2025-	Bay of Plenty	33	(15)
2020–	Hurricanes	51	(5)
2023–2024	North Harbour	18	(0)
- Correct as of 9 January 2025
International career
Years	Team	Apps	(Points)
2018	New Zealand U20	7	(5)
2022	All Blacks XV	1	(0)
- Correct as of 5 November 2022

Tevita Mafileo (born 4 February 1998, in New Zealand) is a New Zealand rugby union player who plays for the Hurricanes in Super Rugby. His playing position is prop. He has named in the Hurricanes squad in 2020.

== Career ==
Tevita Mafileo moved to Tauranga upon finishing high school to join the Bay of Plenty Academy, impressing as an Under-19s representative before going on to be an integral member of the New Zealand Under-20 team during the 2018 World Championships in France. He played at Tauranga Sports and North Shore rugby clubs.

In 2019, he made his Super Rugby debut for the Chiefs before making an appearance at NPC level. Mafileo made his Hurricanes debut against the Stormers in Cape Town in 2020 and earned his first full contract for the 2021 season. In March 2023 Mafileo was banned for 3-weeks, from a red card that was upgraded from a yellow originally shown by referee James Doleman, after connecting with the head of Rebels number eight Richard Hardwick at a ruck.
