= Kini Naholo =

New Zealand rugby union player

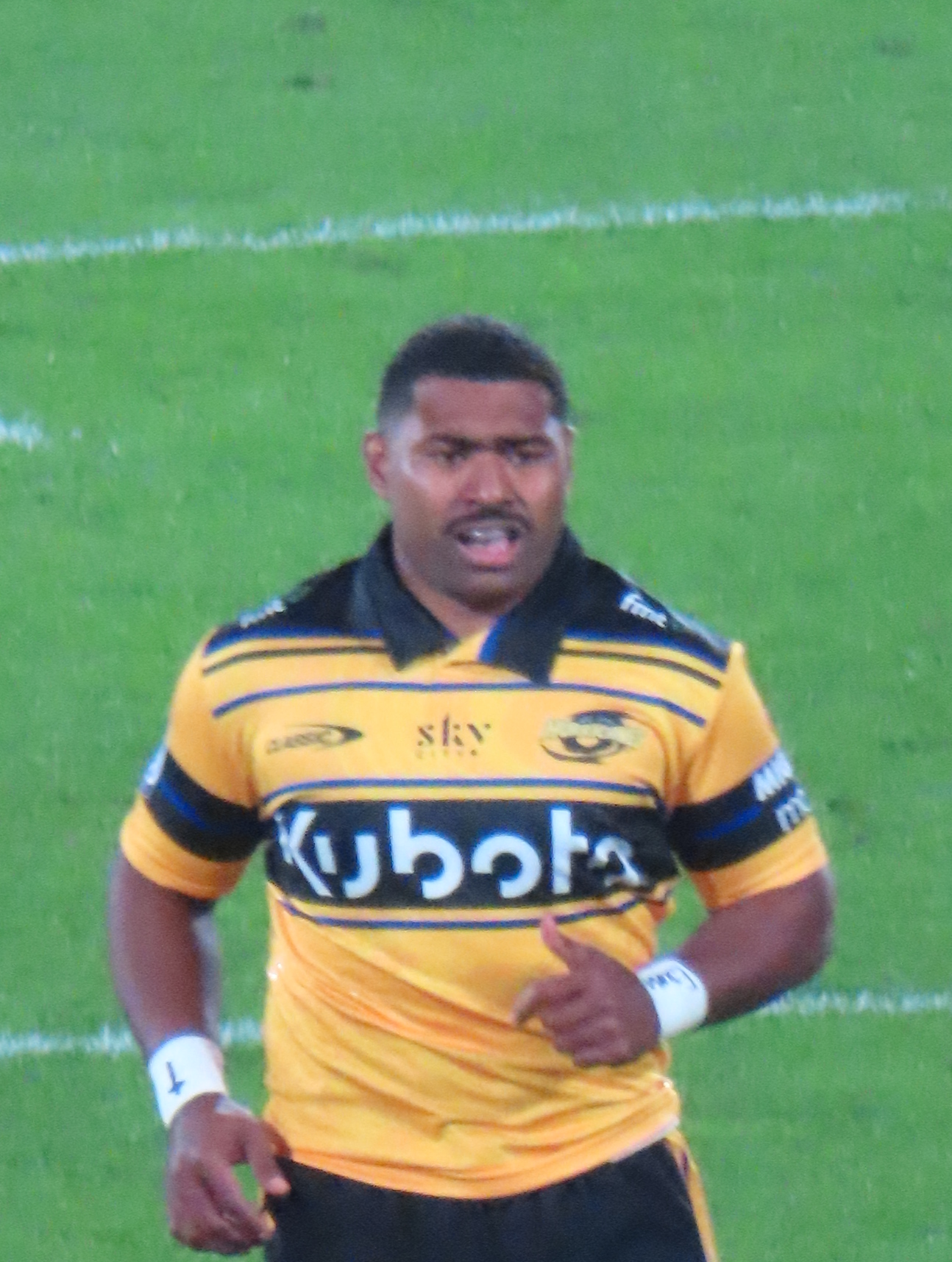
- Naholo playing for the Hurricanes in the 2026 Super Rugby Pacific final
- Full name: Kiniviliame Naholo
- Born: 16 April 1999 (age 27) Sigatoka, Fiji
- Height: 177 cm (5 ft 10 in)
- Weight: 98 kg (216 lb; 15 st 6 lb)
- School: Hastings Boys' High School
- Notable relative: Waisake Naholo (brother)

Rugby union career
- Position: Wing
- Current team: Taranaki, Hurricanes
Senior career
Years	Team	Apps	(Points)
2018–	Taranaki	41	(130)
2020	Chiefs	1	(0)
2022	Crusaders	1	(0)
2023–	Hurricanes	33	(115)
- Correct as of 12 May 2026
International career
Years	Team	Apps	(Points)
2024	All Blacks XV	2	(5)

Kiniviliame Naholo (born 16 April 1999) is a professional rugby union player, who currently plays as a wing for Taranaki in New Zealand's domestic National Provincial Championship (NPC) competition and for the Hurricanes in the Super Rugby. Born in Fiji, Naholo has represented New Zealand's second-national team, the All Blacks XV. He was previously part of the Chiefs squad for the 2020 Super Rugby season and the Crusaders squad for 2022.

== Club career ==
In 2026, Naholo formed part of the Hurricanes squad which won the 2026 Super Rugby Pacific season. On 20 June, the Hurricanes defeated the Chiefs 60–5 in the final.
