= Lalomilo Lalomilo =

New Zealand rugby union player

- Born: 12 February 1999 (age 27) New Zealand
- Height: 180 cm (5 ft 11 in)
- Weight: 100 kg (220 lb; 15 st 10 lb)

Rugby union career
- Position: Centre / Wing / Fullback
- Current team: Bay of Plenty
Senior career
Years	Team	Apps	(Points)
2018–	Bay of Plenty	17	(5)
2023–2026	Moana Pasifika	1	(0)
- Correct as of 19 May 2025
International career
Years	Team	Apps	(Points)
2019	New Zealand U20		
- Correct as of 29 May 2023

Lalomilo Lalomilo (born 12 February 1999) is a New Zealand rugby union player, currently playing for Bay of Plenty. His preferred position is centre, wing or fullback.

== Early career ==
Lalomilo plays his club rugby for Greerton Marist having been the captain of his school side, De La Salle.

== Professional career ==
Lalomilo was named in the Bay of Plenty squad for the 2018 Mitre 10 Cup, 2019 Mitre 10 Cup, 2021 Bunnings NPC and 2022 Bunnings NPC. He joined the Chiefs in the pre-season of 2023, before signing as a replacement player in March 2023. He made his debut for the Chiefs in Round 10 of the 2023 Super Rugby Pacific season against the Crusaders.

Was named in the Moana Pasifika team for 2024 season only to be sidelined for the entire season after needing knee surgery on a meniscus which is now all but gone and is “just bone on bone”.

== International career ==
Lalomilo was named in the New Zealand U20 squad for the 2019 World Rugby Under 20 Championship. He competed for Samoa at the 2024 Summer Olympics in Paris.
