= Jai Knight =

New Zealand rugby union player

- Born: 2 October 2004 (age 22) New Zealand
- Weight: 113 kg (249 lb; 17 st 11 lb)
- School: Mount Maunganui College

Rugby union career
- Position: Lock
- Current team: Chiefs, Bay of Plenty
Senior career
Years	Team	Apps	(Points)
2025–	Bay of Plenty	9	(0)
2026–	Chiefs		
- Correct as of 12 November 2025

Jai Knight (born 2 October 2004) is a New Zealand rugby union player, who plays for the Chiefs and Bay of Plenty. His preferred position is lock.

== Early career ==
Knight attended Mount Maunganui College where he played for the first XV, earning selection for the Chiefs U18 side in 2021. After missing out on representing the Chiefs U20 side, he was selected for the New Zealand Barbarians U21 side for the 2025 U20 tournament.

== Professional career ==
Knight has represented Bay of Plenty in the National Provincial Championship since 2023, being named in the squad for the 2025 Bunnings NPC. He was named in the Chiefs wider training group for the 2026 Super Rugby Pacific season.
