= Nikora Broughton =

New Zealand rugby union player

- Full name: Nikora S.M. Broughton
- Born: 5 September 2001 (age 25) Pātea, New Zealand
- Height: 188 cm (6 ft 2 in)
- Weight: 103 kg (227 lb; 16 st 3 lb)
- School: Hato Paora College

Rugby union career
- Position(s): Number 8, Flanker
- Current team: Bay of Plenty, Highlanders
Senior career
Years	Team	Apps	(Points)
2021–	Bay of Plenty	42	(40)
2023–	Highlanders	22	(15)
- Correct as of 7 September 2025

Nikora Broughton (born 5 September 2001) is a New Zealand rugby union player, who currently plays as a loose forward for Bay of Plenty in New Zealand's domestic National Provincial Championship competition and will play for the Highlanders in Super Rugby Pacific from 2023.

== Early life and career ==
Broughton is the son of former Wellington midfield back Norm Broughton (1992–2002, 59 games).

He attended Hato Paora College and is a former player and captain of the college's 1st XV team. While still at school, Broughton played representative rugby at age-grade level for Manawatu and the Hurricanes.

After finishing secondary school, Broughton headed to the Bay of Plenty region in the north-east of New Zealand's North Island, where he initially played his club rugby for Arataki Sports Club. On 4 September 2019, he was named in the Bay of Plenty Toa (Under 19) team for that year's Jock Hobbs Memorial National U19 tournament. The following year, then playing his club rugby for the Rangiuru Sports Club, Broughton was again selected for the Bay of Plenty Toa team for a series of games against other provincial under 19 sides.

In April 2021, Broughton played for the Chiefs Under 20 squad that won the first ever Super Rugby Aotearoa Under 20 tournament that was held in Taupō, after remaining unbeaten in all three rounds. A year later, he again played for the winning and unbeaten team of the tournament, however, this time that was the New Zealand Barbarians Under 21 team. He was one of the stand-outs of his team during the tournament and created a highlight by chipping the ball over his head at 5m from the Highlanders Under 20's try line. Barbarians teammate Will Gualter caught the ball and dotted down for a try.

== Senior career ==
On 27 July 2021, Broughton was named in the Bay of Plenty wider training group for the 2021 Bunnings NPC season. He played his first NPC game for the Steamers on 15 August 2021 against Southland and scored a try on debut. He played 7 games for Bay of Plenty that first season and was, later that year, named the Bay of Plenty Steamers' "Rookie of the Year" at the province's end-of-year awards function.

As a result of his good performance for Bay of Plenty, Broughton was one of five young players who were invited to train with the Chiefs ahead of the 2022 Super Rugby Pacific season. Later in the year, on 26 July 2022, Broughton was named in the Bay of Plenty squad for the 2022 Bunnings NPC season, this time as a full squad member.

After another good season playing for Bay of Plenty, Broughton was rewarded with a Super Rugby contract. On 26 October 2022, he was named in the Highlanders squad for the 2023 Super Rugby Pacific season.

== International career ==
On 21 September 2018, Broughton – who is of Ngāti Ruanui, Ngā Rauru and Te Āti Haunui-a-Pāpārangi descent – was named in the New Zealand Māori Under 18 team for a two-match series against New Zealand Barbarians Schools and Fiji Schools. A year later, in 2019, he was again named in the New Zealand Māori Under 18 team. The team again played a game against Fiji Schools as well as a game of three halves against New Zealand Schools and New Zealand Barbarians Schools.
