= Richard Judd =

New Zealand rugby union player

- Born: Richard Philip Judd; 18 May 1992 (age 34) Thames, New Zealand
- Height: 178 cm (5 ft 10 in)
- Weight: 90 kg (198 lb; 14 st 2 lb)
- School: Thames High School

Rugby union career
- Position: Half-back
- Current team: Wellington; San Diego Legion
Senior career
Years	Team	Apps	(Points)
2010–2014	Thames Valley	23	(15)
2015–2016	Counties Manukau	18	(25)
2017–2018, 2022-2026	Bay of Plenty	38	(40)
2018–2019, 2022, 2024	Hurricanes	20	(5)
2020–2021	Suntory Sungoliath	2	(0)
2021–2022	Wellington	9	(5)
2021–2022	San Diego Legion		
- Correct as of 9 March 2024
International career
Years	Team	Apps	(Points)
2017	New Zealand Barbarians	1	(0)
- Correct as of 5 June 2022

Richard Philip Judd (born 18 May 1992) is a New Zealand rugby union player who played for the Hurricanes in the Super Rugby competition. He also played for the San Diego Legion of Major League Rugby (MLR) in the U.S. He plays with Rugby Club Vannes. His position of choice is scrum-half.
