= Kaleb Trask =

New Zealand rugby union player

- Born: 27 January 1999 (age 27) Rotorua, New Zealand
- Height: 180 cm (5 ft 11 in)
- Weight: 90 kg (198 lb; 14 st 2 lb)
- School: Rotorua Boys' High School

Rugby union career
- Position(s): First five-eighth, Fullback
- Current team: Suntory Sungoliath
Senior career
| Years | Team | Apps | (Points) |
| 2018–2025 | Bay of Plenty | 29 | (194) |
| 2020–2021 2023-2025 | Chiefs | 22 | (45) |
| 2022 | Honda Heat | 12 | (66) |
| 2025– | Suntory Sungoliath | 13 | (57) |
- Correct as of 8 September 2022
International career
| Years | Team | Apps | (Points) |
| 2018 | New Zealand U20 | 7 | (17) |
| 2020–2025 | Māori All Blacks | 2 | (13) |
- Correct as of 3 July 2021

Kaleb Trask (born 27 January 1999 in New Zealand) is a New Zealand rugby union player who plays for the Chiefs in Super Rugby. His playing position is fly-half. He has signed for the Chiefs squad in 2020.

== Personal life ==
Trask is a New Zealander of Māori descent (Ngāpuhi descent).
