= Hemopo Cunningham =

New Zealand rugby union player

- Born: 11 August 2001 (age 25) New Zealand
- Height: 187 cm (6 ft 2 in)
- Weight: 100 kg (220 lb; 15 st 10 lb)
- School: Rotorua Boys' High School

Rugby union career
- Position: Lock / Flanker
- Current team: Blues, Taranaki
Senior career
Years	Team	Apps	(Points)
2021–	Taranaki	22	(5)
2026–	Blues		
- Correct as of 10 November 2025

Hemopo Cunningham (born 11 August 2001) is a New Zealand rugby union player, who plays for the Blues and Taranaki. His preferred position is lock or flanker.

== Early career ==
Cunningham attended Rotorua Boys' High School where he played for the first XV. In 2019, he represented the New Zealand Maori U18 team before joining up with the Taranaki academy. He plays his club rugby for Stratford-Eltham in the Taranaki region.

== Professional career ==
Cunningham has represented Taranaki in the National Provincial Championship since 2021, being named in the squad for the 2025 Bunnings NPC. He was named in the Blues wider training group for the 2026 Super Rugby Pacific season.
