= Daniel Rona =

New Zealand rugby union player

- Born: 10 April 2000 (age 26) New Zealand
- Height: 187 cm (6 ft 2 in)
- Weight: 94 kg (207 lb; 14 st 11 lb)
- Notable relative: Curtis Rona (brother)

Rugby union career
- Position: Centre
- Current team: Chiefs / Taranaki
Senior career
| Years | Team | Apps | (Points) |
| 2020– | Taranaki | 45 | (60) |
| 2023– | Chiefs | 43 | (80) |
- Correct as of 16 May 2026

Daniel Rona (born 10 April 2000) is a New Zealand rugby union player, currently playing for the Chiefs and Taranaki. His preferred position is centre.

== Early career ==
A concreter by trade, Rona originally started out as a halfback for Clifton Rugby Club, before moving to centre.

== Professional career ==
Rona was named in the Taranaki squad for the 2020 Mitre 10 Cup, 2021 Bunnings NPC and 2022 Bunnings NPC. He joined the Chiefs in the pre-season of 2023, before signing a 30-day training contract with the side in March 2023. He made his debut for the Chiefs in Round 3 of the 2023 Super Rugby Pacific season against the Highlanders. He signed a full-time deal with the Chiefs in May 2023 through to 2026.

== Personal life ==
Rona is a New Zealander of Māori descent (Te Ātiawa descent).
