= Braden Stewart =

New Zealand rugby player (born 1996)

- Born: 20 September 1996 (age 30) Blenheim, New Zealand
- School: Marlborough Boys' College

Rugby union career
- Position: Flanker
Senior career
Years	Team	Apps	(Points)
2016–2020, 2022–2024	Tasman	29	(5)
- Correct as of 13 October 2024

Braden J. Stewart (born 20 September 1996) is a New Zealand rugby union player. His position is Flanker.

== Career ==
Stewart made his debut for Tasman in Round 9 of the 2016 Mitre 10 Cup against North Harbour, coming off the bench in a 27–27 draw.
