= Brodie McAlister =

New Zealand rugby union player

- Born: 17 June 1997 (age 29) New Zealand
- Height: 182 cm (6 ft 0 in)
- Weight: 112 kg (247 lb; 17 st 9 lb)
- School: Shirley Boys' High School

Rugby union career
- Position: Hooker
- Current team: Canterbury, Chiefs
Provincial / State sides
Years	Team	Apps	(Points)
2018–	Canterbury	44	(80)
Super Rugby
Years	Team	Apps	(Points)
2019–2024	Crusaders	41	(30)
2025–	Chiefs	12	(0)
International career
Years	Team	Apps	(Points)
2022–2024	All Blacks XV	3	(10)
2025–	All Blacks	2	(5)
- Correct as of 19 July 2025

Brodie McAlister (born 17 June 1997) is a New Zealand rugby union player who currently plays as a hooker for the Chiefs in Super Rugby and Canterbury in the Bunnings NPC. He previously played for the Crusaders. Internationally, he has played for the All Blacks XV team.
