= Emoni Narawa =

Fijian rugby union player (born 1999)

- Full name: Emoni Rokomoce Narawa
- Born: 13 July 1999 (age 27) Suva, Fiji
- Height: 1.84 m (6 ft 0 in)
- Weight: 98 kg (216 lb; 15 st 6 lb)
- School: Hamilton Boys' High School

Rugby union career
- Position(s): Wing, Fullback
- Current team: Bay of Plenty, Chiefs
Senior career
Years	Team	Apps	(Points)
2018–	Bay of Plenty	50	(153)
2020–2021	Blues	7	(5)
2022–	Chiefs	42	(125)
- Correct as of 2 August 2025
International career
Years	Team	Apps	(Points)
2023–	New Zealand	4	(10)
- Correct as of 6 September 2025

Emoni Rokomoce Narawa (born 13 July 1999) is a professional rugby union player who plays as a wing for Super Rugby club Chiefs. Born in Fiji, he represents New Zealand at international level after qualifying on residency grounds.

== International career ==
Narawa made his international debut for the All Blacks against Argentina at the Estadio Malvinas Argentinas, Mendoza on 8 July 2023 in the 2023 Rugby Championship. Narawa started the match on the right wing and scored one try in New Zealand's 12–41 victory.

== Honours ==
New Zealand

- 1× The Rugby Championship: 2023

Chiefs

- 3× Super Rugby runners-up: 2023-2024-2025-2026 ) ;
