= Benet Kumeroa =

New Zealand rugby union player

- Born: 25 June 2000 (age 26) New Zealand
- Height: 184 cm (6 ft 0 in)
- Weight: 119 kg (262 lb; 18 st 10 lb)
- School: Auckland Grammar School

Rugby union career
- Position: Prop
- Current team: Chiefs, Bay of Plenty
Senior career
Years	Team	Apps	(Points)
2021–	Bay of Plenty	35	(0)
2026–	Chiefs	8	(0)
- Correct as of 9 November 2025
International career
Years	Team	Apps	(Points)
2024–2025	Māori All Blacks	4	(0)
- Correct as of 9 November 2025

Benet Kumeroa (born 25 June 2000) is a New Zealand rugby union player, who plays for the Chiefs and Bay of Plenty. His preferred position is prop.

== Early career ==
Kumeroa is from Whanganui and attended Auckland Grammar School where he was a member of the first XV in rugby, and also competed in weightlifting. He was named in the New Zealand U20 development squad in 2020, and spent the 2024 pre-season with the Hurricanes.

== Professional career ==
Kumeroa has represented Bay of Plenty in the National Provincial Championship since 2021, being named in the squad for the 2025 Bunnings NPC. He was named in the Chiefs squad for the 2026 Super Rugby Pacific season.

Kumeroa has represented the Māori All Blacks on four occasions, in 2024 and 2025.
