= Matt Matich =

- Born: 10 July 1991 (age 35) Dargaville, New Zealand
- Height: 186 cm (6 ft 1 in)
- Weight: 106 kg (16 st 10 lb; 234 lb)
- School: Mt Albert Grammar School

Rugby union career
- Position(s): Flanker, Number 8
- Current team: Northland
Senior career
Years	Team	Apps	(Points)
2020	Olimpia Lions	1	(0)
- Correct as of 29 September 2024
Provincial / State sides
Years	Team	Apps	(Points)
2015	Auckland	6	(0)
2016–2020, 2022–	Northland	69	(55)
- Correct as of 29 September 2024
Super Rugby
Years	Team	Apps	(Points)
2018	Chiefs	2	(0)
2019	Blues	3	(0)
- Correct as of 29 September 2024
International career
Years	Team	Apps	(Points)
2017	New Zealand Barbarians	1	(0)
- Correct as of 29 September 2024

Matthew E. S. Matich (born 10 July 1991) is a New Zealand rugby union player who plays for Northland in the Bunnings NPC. His position is Number 8.
