= Josh Hill (rugby union) =

New Zealand rugby union player

Joshua Arana Hill
- Born: Joshua Arana Hill; 22 April 1999 (age 27) New Zealand
- Height: 1.95 m (6 ft 5 in)
- Weight: 110 kg (17 st 5 lb; 243 lb)
- School: South Otago High School
- University: University of Otago

Rugby union career
- Position: Lock
- Current team: Rebels / Otago
Senior career
Years	Team	Apps	(Points)
2019–	Otago	18	(5)
- Correct as of 12 November 2021
Super Rugby
Years	Team	Apps	(Points)
2022	Rebels	7	(0)
- Correct as of 17 November 2022

Joshua Arana Hill (born 22 April 1999) is a New Zealand rugby union player who plays for Otago in the National Provincial Championship (NPC). His playing position is lock.

== Early life ==
Hill attended South Otago High School in Balclutha where he was deputy head boy and was the school's first XV captain. In 2017, he formed part of a national under-18 Māori team.

Hill has played club rugby for Otago University RFC.

== Rugby career ==
Hill signed for Otago in 2019. He made his debut in a 37–20 win against Manawatu on 30 August that year. He would go on to play 5 matches in his maiden season.

Hill made 6 appearances for the Otago Razorbacks in the 2020 Mitre 10 Cup season and, as of 2021, continues to play for Otago. He scored his first Otago try in a 44–16 away semifinal win against Manawatu on 12 November 2021.

== Personal life ==
Hill pertains to the Ngāi Tahu and Ngāpuhi Māori iwi.

== Super Rugby statistics ==
As of 30 May 2022

Season	Team	Games	Starts	Sub	Mins	Tries	Cons	Pens	Drops	Points	Yel	Red
2022	Rebels	7	4	3	273	0	0	0	0	0	0	0
Total		7	4	3	273	0	0	0	0	0	0	0
