= Seuseu Naitoa Ah Kuoi =

New Zealand rugby union player

- Full name: Seuseu Naitoa Machete Ah Kuoi
- Born: 7 October 1999 (age 27) Wellington, New Zealand
- Height: 196 cm (6 ft 5 in)
- Weight: 116 kg (256 lb; 18 st 4 lb)
- School: Wellington College

Rugby union career
- Position: Lock
- Current team: Chiefs, Bay of Plenty
Senior career
| Years | Team | Apps | (Points) |
| 2019–2020 | Wellington | 20 | (10) |
| 2020– | Chiefs | 78 | (10) |
| 2021– | Bay of Plenty | 35 | (35) |
- Correct as of 17 August 2023
International career
| Years | Team | Apps | (Points) |
| 2019 | New Zealand U20 | 1 | (0) |
- Correct as of 20 June 2020

Seuseu Naitoa Ah Kuoi (born 7 October 1999) is a New Zealand rugby union player who plays for the Chiefs in Super Rugby and the Bay of Plenty Steamers in the NPC. His playing position is lock. He signed for the Chiefs squad in 2020.

== Reference list ==
2024 All Blacks XV 2 games 2025 All Blacks Training squad
