= Kaylum Boshier =

New Zealand rugby union player

- Full name: Kaylum Luke Boshier
- Born: 9 April 1999 (age 27) New Plymouth, New Zealand
- Height: 194 cm (6 ft 4 in)
- Weight: 108 kg (238 lb; 17 st 0 lb)
- School: New Plymouth Boys' High School
- Notable relative: Lachlan Boshier (brother)

Rugby union career
- Position(s): Number 8, Flanker, Lock
- Current team: Taranaki, Chiefs
Senior career
Years	Team	Apps	(Points)
2018–	Taranaki	34	(40)
2021–	Chiefs	40	(45)
- Correct as of 16 March 2024
International career
Years	Team	Apps	(Points)
2019	New Zealand U20	6	(5)
- Correct as of 16 March 2024

Kaylum Boshier (born 9 April 1999 in New Zealand) is a New Zealand rugby union player who has played for Taranaki in the National Provincial Championship and the Chiefs in Super Rugby. His playing position is flanker.

He was first named in the Chiefs squad for the 2021 Super Rugby Aotearoa season.

Boshier also plays cricket, and was named as the captain of New Zealand's squad for the 2018 Under-19 Cricket World Cup.
