= Taranaki (National Provincial Championship) =

NZ rugby union club, based in New Plymouth

- Taranaki Bulls logo
- Union: Taranaki Rugby Football Union
- Nickname: Bulls
- Founded: 1885; 141 years ago
- Location: New Plymouth, New Zealand
- Ground: Stadium Taranaki (Capacity: 30,000)
- CEO: Jimmy Fastier
- Coach: Jarrad Hoeata
- Captain: Kaylum Boshier
- Most appearances: Kieran Crowley (199)
- Top scorer: Kieran Crowley (1,723)
- Most tries: Kieran Crowley (64)
- League: National Provincial Championship
- 2025: 5th Quarter-finals
Team kit

Official website
- www.trfu.co.nz

Taranaki (often known as the Taranaki Bulls) are a New Zealand professional rugby union team based in New Plymouth, New Zealand. They represent the Taranaki region and compete National Provincial Championship. The union was originally established in 1889, with the National Provincial Championship established in 1976.

The team is governed by the Taranaki Rugby Football Union, and typically play their home games at Stadium Taranaki in New Plymouth. The team is affiliated with the Chiefs Super Rugby franchise. Their home playing colours are amber and black.

== Current squad ==
The Taranaki Bulls squad for the 2026 Hilux NPC is:

2026 Taranaki squad
**Props**: (New Zealand) Dane Johnston ^{DEV}; (New Zealand) Perry Lawrence; (New Zealand) Reuben O'Neill; (Fiji) **Marika Parker**; (New Zealand) Jared Proffit; (New Zealand) Keightley Watson; **Hookers**: (New Zealand) Harry Hansen; (New Zealand) Zach Landon-Lane ^{ST} (Note: Landon-Lane wasn't named in the original Taranaki squad, but was named in the side for Round 4 (on loan from Canterbury).); (New Zealand) Suli Pahulu; (New Zealand) JJ Pokai; (New Zealand) Bradley Slater; **Locks**: (New Zealand) **Scott Barrett**; (New Zealand) Liam Chapman ^{ST} (Note: Chapman wasn't named in the original Taranaki squad, but was announced as a late inclusion in the side for Round 5.); (New Zealand) Scott Jury; (New Zealand) **Josh Lord**; (New Zealand) Jesse Parete; (New Zealand) Fiti Sa; (New Zealand) Jayden Sa; (New Zealand) **Tupou Vaa'i**	**Loose forwards**: (New Zealand) Kaylum Boshier **(c)**; (New Zealand) Hemopo Cunningham (injured); (New Zealand) Olly Lawson; (New Zealand) Michael Loft; (Fiji) Josefa Namosimalua; (New Zealand) Arese Poliko; (New Zealand) Bradley Tocker ^{DEV}; (New Zealand) Sage Walters-Hansen; **Halfbacks (scrum-halves)**: (New Zealand) Logan Crowley; (New Zealand) Adam Lennox; (New Zealand) Tai Mildon ^{ST} (Note: Mildon wasn’t named in the original Taranaki squad, but was announced in the side for Round 6.); (New Zealand) Quintony Ngatai; (Tonga) Chris Vunipola; **First five-eighths (fly-halves)**: (New Zealand) **Beauden Barrett**; (New Zealand) Sam Clarke; (New Zealand) Josh Jacomb; (New Zealand) Rocky Olsen; (New Zealand) Jamie Viljoen ^{DEV}	**Midfielders (centres)**: (New Zealand) **Jordie Barrett**; (New Zealand) Meihana Grindlay; (New Zealand) Daniel Rona; (Fiji) **Seta Tamanivalu**; (New Zealand) Haki Wiseman; **Outside backs**: (New Zealand) Kini Naholo; (New Zealand) Willem Ratu (Note: Ratu wasn't named in the original Taranaki squad, but was announced in the side for Round 1.); (New Zealand) Jacob Ratumaitavuki-Kneepkens; (New Zealand) Noah Rogers ^{DEV}; (New Zealand) Indiha Saotui-Huta; (New Zealand) Josh Setu; (Fiji) Vereniki Tikoisolomone
**(c)** denotes the team captain. **Bold** denotes internationally capped players.^{ST} denotes a short-term signing.^{DEV} denotes a development squad member. denotes an injured player. Source:

== Honours ==
Taranaki have been overall Champions twice, winning the title in 2014 and 2023. They are also the current holders of the Ranfurly Shield having won the shield during the 2024 Bunnings NPC. Their full list of honours include:

National Provincial Championship Second Division North Island

- Winners: 1976, 1982, 1983, 1984

National Provincial Championship Second Division

- Winners: 1985, 1992, 1995

ITM Cup Premiership Division

- Winners: 2014

Bunnings NPC Championship Division

- Winners: 2021

Bunnings NPC

- Winners: 2023

== Current Super Rugby players ==
Players named in the 2025 Taranaki Bulls squad, who also earned contracts or were named in a squad for any side participating in the 2025 Super Rugby Pacific season.

Player	Team
Beauden Barrett	Blues
Scott Barrett	Crusaders
Kaylum Boshier	Chiefs
Meihana Grindlay	Blues
Josh Jacomb	Chiefs
Adam Lennox	Highlanders
Michael Loft	Highlanders
Josh Lord	Chiefs
Kini Naholo	Hurricanes
Leone Nawai	Drua
Reuben O'Neill	Chiefs
Arese Poliko	Hurricanes
Jared Proffit	Chiefs
Taniela Rakuro	Drua
Jacob Ratumaitavuki-Kneepkens	Highlanders
Daniel Rona	Chiefs
Fiti Sa	Chiefs
Bradley Slater	Chiefs
Tupou Vaa'i	Chiefs
