= Bay of Plenty (National Provincial Championship) =

NZ rugby union club, based in Mount Maunganui, New Zealand

- Official BOPRU emblem
- Union: Bay of Plenty Rugby Union
- Nickname: Steamers
- Founded: 1911; 115 years ago
- Location: Mount Maunganui, Tauranga, New Zealand
- Ground(s): Rotorua International Stadium (Capacity: 34,000); Tauranga Domain (Capacity: 5,500)
- CEO: Mike Rogers
- Coach: Richard Watt
- Captain: TBA
- Most appearances: Ron Preston (152)
- Top scorer: Ron Preston (846)
- Most tries: Keith Pryor (46)
- League: National Provincial Championship
- 2025: 3rd Semi-finalist
Team kit

Official website
- www.boprugby.co.nz

Bay of Plenty (often known as the Bay of Plenty Steamers) are a New Zealand professional rugby union team based in Mount Maunganui, New Zealand. The union was originally established in 1911, with the National Provincial Championship established in 1976. They now play in the reformed National Provincial Championship competition. They play their home games at Rotorua International Stadium in Rotorua or Tauranga Domain, Tauranga, both in the Bay of Plenty Region. The team is affiliated with the Chiefs Super Rugby franchise. Their home playing colours are blue and yellow.

== Current squad ==
The Bay of Plenty Steamers squad for the 2026 Hilux NPC season is:

2026 Bay of Plenty squad
**Props**: (New Zealand) Josh Bartlett; (New Zealand) Benet Kumeroa; (New Zealand) Tevita Mafileo; (New Zealand) Jaya More ^{ST} (Note: More wasn’t named in the original Bay of Plenty squad, but was announced in the side for Round 9.); (Fiji) Harold Rounds ^{DEV} (Note: Rounds wasn't named in the original Bay of Plenty squad, but was announced in the side for Round 3.); (New Zealand) Toby Taylor; (New Zealand) **Pasilio Tosi**; (Tonga) **Solomone Tukuafu**; (New Zealand) Filipe Vakasiuola; (New Zealand) Leo Wiki-Quest ^{DEV} (Note: Wiki-Quest wasn't named in the original Bay of Plenty squad, but was announced as a late inclusion in the side for Round 7.); **Hookers**: (New Zealand) Kurt Eklund; (New Zealand) Taine Kolose; (Fiji) Sairusi Ravudi; (New Zealand) Sione Tupou; **Locks**: (New Zealand) Seuseu Naitoa Ah Kuoi; (New Zealand) Jai Knight; (New Zealand) Reuben Palmer; (New Zealand) Aisake Vakasiuola	**Loose forwards**: (New Zealand) Nikora Broughton; (New Zealand) Kalin Felise; (New Zealand) Joe Johnston; (New Zealand) Veveni Lasaqa; (New Zealand) Trent Ririnui; (New Zealand) Aidan Spratley ^{ST} (Note: Spratley wasn’t named in the original Bay of Plenty squad, but was announced in the side for Round 6.); **Halfbacks (scrum-halves)**: (New Zealand) Richard Judd; (New Zealand) Charlie Sinton; (New Zealand) **Te Toiroa Tahuriorangi**; **First five-eighths (fly-halves)**: (New Zealand) Lucas Cashmore; (New Zealand) Aaron Gibbs; (New Zealand) Riley Hohepa	**Midfielders (centres)**: (New Zealand) Tamiro Armstrong; (New Zealand) Reon Paul; (New Zealand) Joe Webber; **Outside backs**: (New Zealand) Reegan Aarsen; (New Zealand) **Leroy Carter**; (New Zealand) **Fehi Fineanganofo**; (New Zealand) Cole Forbes; (New Zealand) Kele Lasaqa; (Australia) Viliami Lea ^{ST} (Note: Lea wasn't named in the original Bay of Plenty squad, but was named in the side for Round 4.); (New Zealand) **Emoni Narawa**; (Zimbabwe) **Jason Robertson**; (New Zealand) Roderick Solo; (New Zealand) Frank Vaenuku; (New Zealand) Rory van Vugt ^{ST} (Note: Van Vugt wasn't named in the original Bay of Plenty squad, but was named as a late inclusion in the side for Round 3.); (New Zealand) Regan Ware ^{ST} (Note: Ware wasn't named in the original Bay of Plenty squad, but was announced in the side for Round 2.)
**(c)** denotes the team captain. **Bold** denotes internationally capped players.^{ST} denotes a short-term signing.^{DEV} denotes a development squad member. Source:

== Honours ==
Bay of Plenty have been overall Champions on 1 occasion, winning the inaugural title in 1976. Their full list of honours include:

National Provincial Championship First Division

- Winners: 1976

National Provincial Championship Second Division North Island

- Winners: 1978

National Provincial Championship Second Division

- Winners: 2000

Mitre 10 Cup Championship Division

- Winners: 2019

== Current Super Rugby players ==
Players named in the 2025 Bay of Plenty Steamers squad, who also earned contracts or were named in a squad for any side participating in the 2025 Super Rugby Pacific season.

Player	Team
Naitoa Ah Kuoi	Chiefs
Josh Bartlett	Highlanders
Nikora Broughton	Highlanders
Leroy Carter	Chiefs
Lucas Cashmore	Hurricanes
Kurt Eklund	Blues
Fehi Fineanganofo	Hurricanes
Cole Forbes	Blues
Haereiti Hetet	Drua
Lalomilo Lalomilo	Moana Pasifika
Veveni Lasaqa	Highlanders
Tevita Mafileo	Hurricanes
Emoni Narawa	Chiefs
Reon Paul	Blues
Rameka Poihipi	Chiefs
Te Toiroa Tahuriorangi	Chiefs
Pasilio Tosi	Hurricanes
Kaleb Trask	Chiefs
