= Ranfurly Shield 2020–2029 =

New Zealand rugby union trophy

Ranfurly Shield
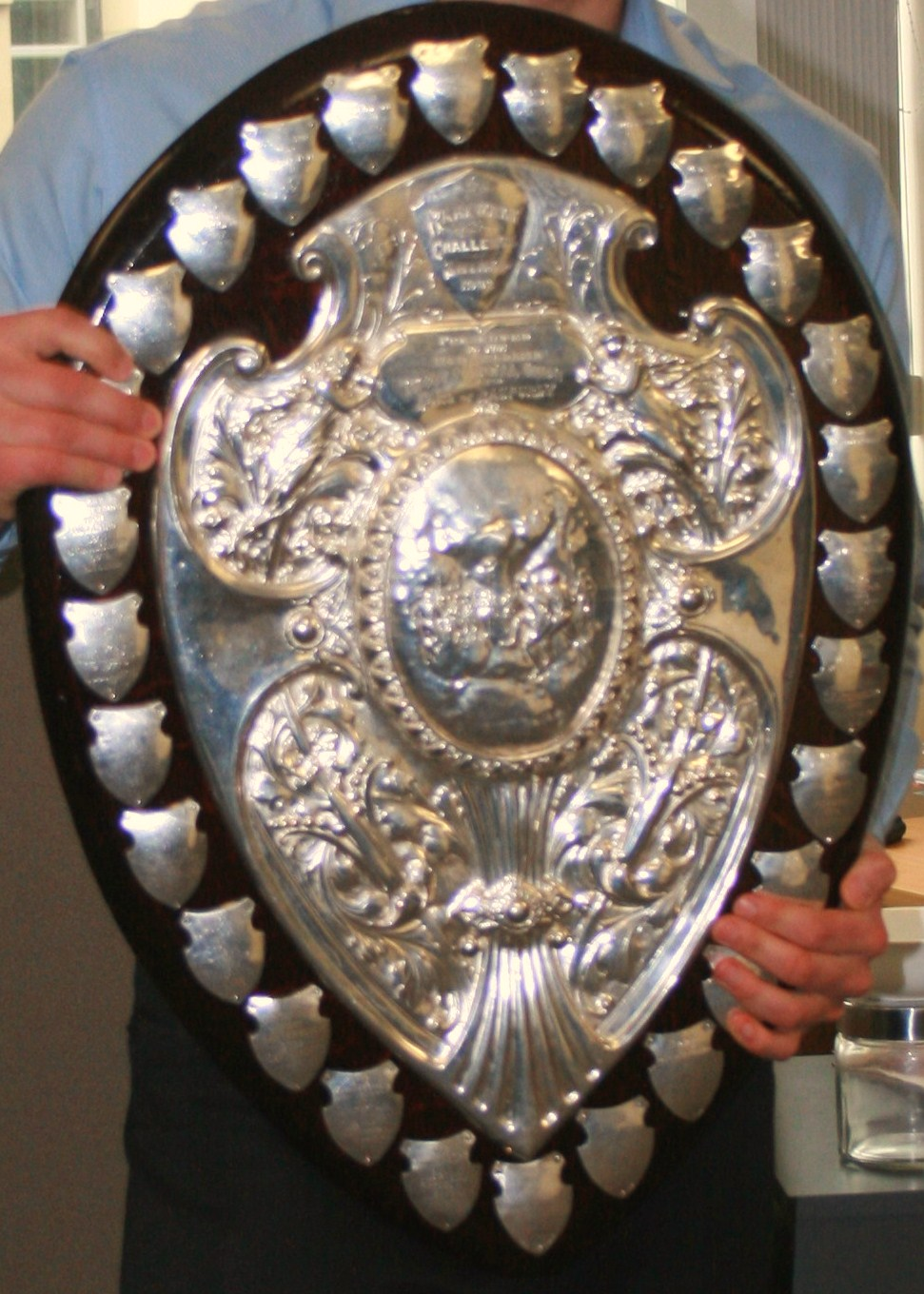
- Countries: New Zealand
- Champions: Counties Manukau
- Matches played: 53
- Tries scored: 434 (average 8.2 per match)
- Top point scorer: Lincoln McClutchie (Hawke's Bay); 203 points
- Top try scorer: Neria Fomai (Hawke's Bay); 9 tries

Official website
- www.provincial.rugby/npc/ranfurly-shield

The Ranfurly Shield, colloquially known as the Log o' Wood, is perhaps the most prestigious trophy in New Zealand's domestic rugby union competition. First played for in 1904, the Ranfurly Shield is based on a challenge system, rather than a league or knockout competition as with most football trophies. The holding union defends the Shield in challenge matches - which are their home games - and if a challenger defeats them, they become the new holder of the Shield.

The Shield is currently held by Counties Manukau, who won it from Northland in a 22–19 victory on 26 September 2026. Northland held the Shield since 20 August 2026, when they took the Shield off Canterbury.

Canterbury hold the record of the highest number of successful Ranfurly Shield challenges with 18 wins, two more than Auckland. Southland hold the record of the shortest Ranfurly Shield reign (six days).

== Holders ==
Key
| * | Current Ranfurly Shield holders |

| Team | Won | Successful defences |
|---|---|---|
| Canterbury | Held at beginning of decade | 1 |
| Taranaki | 19 September 2020 | 0 |
| Otago | 27 September 2020 | 0 |
| Hawke's Bay | 4 October 2020 | 14 |
| Wellington | 17 September 2022 | 7 |
| Hawke's Bay | 30 September 2023 | 4 |
| Tasman | 7 September 2024 | 2 |
| Taranaki | 6 October 2024 | 3 |
| Waikato | 23 August 2025 | 0 |
| Southland | 31 August 2025 | 0 |
| Canterbury | 6 September 2025 | 1 |
| Otago | 20 September 2025 | 3 |
| Canterbury | 9 August 2026 | 1 |
| Northland | 20 August 2026 | 2 |
| Counties Manukau* | 26 September 2026 | 1 |

| Team | Wins | Successful defences | Average defences |
|---|---|---|---|
| Hawke's Bay | 2 | 18 | 9 |
| Otago | 2 | 3 | 1.5 |
| Canterbury | 2 | 3 | 1.5 |
| Taranaki | 2 | 3 | 1.5 |
| Wellington | 1 | 7 | 7 |
| Northland | 1 | 2 | 2 |
| Tasman | 1 | 2 | 2 |
| Counties Manukau* | 1 | 1 | 1 |
| Southland | 1 | 0 | 0 |
| Waikato | 1 | 0 | 0 |

Last updated: after Counties Manukau successfully defended the Shield on 3 October 2026.

== Fixtures ==
=== 2020 ===
| 28 August 2020 | Canterbury | 71–7 | North Otago | Rugby Park, Christchurch |
| 14:05 NZST | Try: Dallas McLeod 6'; Andrew Knewstubb 12'; Finlay Brewis 16'; Isaiah Punivai 18'; Billy Harmon 21'; Manasa Mataele (2) 27', 48'; Chay Fihaki 40'; Sam Darry (2) 52', 56'; Rameka Poihipi 79'; Con: Brett Cameron (8/11) 7', 17', 19', 22', 28', 53', 57', 80' | Preview; Report | Try: Josh Hayward 70'; Con: Josh Phipps (1/1) 71' | Referee: Daniel Waenga |

| 19 September 2020 | Canterbury | 22–23 | Taranaki | Orangetheory Stadium, Christchurch |
| 16:35 NZST | Try: Oliver Jager 42'; Richie Mo'unga 56'; Andrew Knewstubb 71'; Con: Richie Mo'unga (2/3) 57', 72'; Pen: Richie Mo'unga (1/1) 22' | Report | Try: Jacob Ratumaitavuki-Kneepkens (2) 6', 27'; Tupou Vaa'i 10'; Con: Jordie Barrett (1/3) 28'; Pen: Jordie Barrett (2/3) 3', 75' | Referee: Ben O'Keeffe |

| 27 September 2020 | Taranaki | 19–30 | Otago | TET Stadium & Events Centre, Inglewood |
| 14:05 NZST | Try: Stephen Perofeta 13'; Kaylum Boshier 49'; Lachlan Boshier 75'; Con: Jayson Potroz (1/2) 50'; Daniel Waite (1/1) 76' | Report | Try: Dylan Nel 10'; Freedom Vaha'akolo 33'; Liam Coltman 38'; Josh Ioane 58'; Con: Josh Ioane (2/4) 34', 39'; Pen: Josh Ioane (2/2) 6', 72' | Referee: Mike Fraser |

| 4 October 2020 | Otago | 9–28 | Hawke's Bay | Forsyth Barr Stadium, Dunedin |
| 16:35 NZST | Pen: Josh Ioane (3/3) 9', 20', 55'; Cards: Vilimoni Koroi (yellow card) 62'; Slade McDowall (red card) 71' | Report | Try: Lolagi Visinia 35'; Folau Fakatava 50'; Isaia Walker-Leawere 63'; Kurt Baker 75'; Con: Lincoln McClutchie (2/2) 36', 51'; Caleb Makene (2/2) 65', 76' | Referee: Cameron Stone |

| 16 October 2020 | Hawke's Bay | 33–17 | Northland | McLean Park, Napier |
| 19:05 NZST | Try: Neria Fomai 44'; Ash Dixon 53'; Danny Toala 65'; Devan Flanders 73'; Con: Lincoln McClutchie (2/4) 45', 66'; Pen: Lincoln McClutchie (3/3) 17', 29', 40' | Report | Try: Lua Li (2) 59', 79'; Con: Dan Hawkins (1/1) 60'; Johnny Cooper (1/1) 80'; Pen: Dan Hawkins (1/1) 22' | Referee: Brendon Pickerill |

| 24 October 2020 | Hawke's Bay | 47–12 | Manawatu | McLean Park, Napier |
| 16:35 NZST | Try: Danny Toala 23'; Devan Flanders 31'; Caleb Makene 37'; Brendon O'Connor 40'; Ash Dixon 66'; Neria Fomai 72'; Isaia Walker-Leawere 77'; Con: Lincoln McClutchie (4/4) 24', 32', 38', 40'; Connor McLeod (2/3) 67', 79' | Report | Try: James Tofa 17'; Ben Wyness 34'; Con: Ben Wyness (1/2) 35' | Referee: Nick Briant |

| 8 November 2020 | Hawke's Bay | 34–18 | Wellington | McLean Park, Napier |
| 14:05 NZST | Try: Devan Flanders 12'; Marino Mikaele-Tu'u 17'; Stacey Ili 20'; Neria Fomai 53'; Con: Caleb Makene (3/3) 14', 18', 21'; Lincoln McClutchie (1/1) 56'; Pen: Caleb Makene (2/2) 3', 24'; Cards: Kurt Baker (yellow card) 60' | Report | Try: Naitoa Ah Kuoi 56'; Kaliopasi Uluilakepa 63'; Con: Jackson Garden-Bachop (1/2) 64'; Pen: Jackson Garden-Bachop (2/2) 6', 11' | Referee: Richard Kelly |

=== 2021 ===
| 30 June 2021 | Hawke's Bay | 85–0 | North Otago | McLean Park, Napier |
| 19:05 NZST | Try: Kienan Higgins 4'; Penalty try 10'; Jason Long (2) 18', 21'; Lolagi Visinia (2) 32', 52'; Tom Parsons 40+2'; Jacob Devery 43'; Anzelo Tuitavuki 45'; Josh Kaifa (2) 58', 76'; Danny Toala 68'; Namatahi Waa 72'; Con: Lincoln McClutchie (9/11) 5', 19', 23', 33', 40', 44', 47', 73', 77'; Danny Toala (0/1) | Preview; Report | Cards: Manulua Taiti (yellow card) 9' | Referee: Michael Winter |

| 24 July 2021 | Hawke's Bay | 93–5 | East Coast | McLean Park, Napier |
| 15:00 NZST | Try: Gareth Evans 5'; Josh Kaifa (2) 10', 41'; Danny Toala (2) 14', 51'; Anzelo Tuitavuki (2) 21', 46'; Kianu Kereru-Symes 26'; Dennon Robinson-Bartlett 34'; Namatahi Waa 39'; Lincoln McClutchie (2) 57', 72'; Pouri Rakete-Stones (2) 62', 74'; Elijah Martin 64'; Con: Lincoln McClutchie (9/15) 6', 22', 40', 48', 57', 63', 65', 73', 75' | Preview; Report | Try: Jorian Tangaere 30'; Con: Terangi Fraser (0/1) | Referee: Stuart Curran |

| 14 August 2021 | Hawke's Bay | 34–10 | Otago | McLean Park, Napier |
| 16:35 NZST | Try: Neria Fomai 28'; Lolagi Visinia 35'; Stacey Ili 52'; Josh Kaifa 65'; Jonah Lowe 81'; Con: Lincoln McClutchie (2/3) 30', 36'; Tiaan Falcon (1/2) 82'; Pen: Tiaan Falcon (1/1) 71' | Preview; Report | Try: Freedom Vahaakolo 19'; Con: Vilimoni Koroi (1/1) 20'; Pen: Vilimoni Koroi (1/2) 42' | Referee: Nick Briant |

| 19 September 2021 | Hawke's Bay | 36–33 (a.e.t.) | Bay of Plenty | McLean Park, Napier |
| 14:05 NZST | Try: Ash Dixon 14'; Solomone Funaki 20'; Pouri Rakete-Stones 31'; Con: Lincoln McClutchie (3/3) 15', 21', 32'; Pen: Lincoln McClutchie (3/3) 29', 37', 63'; Tiaan Falcon (2/2) 81', 84' | Preview; Report | Try: Emoni Narawa 4'; Luke Campbell 18'; Onisi Ratave (2) 25', 77'; Sean Wainui 59'; Con: Kaleb Trask (2/3) 19', 26'; Otere Black (2/2) 60', 78'; Pen: Kaleb Trask (0/1) | Referee: Paul Williams |

| 9 October 2021 | Hawke's Bay | 34–22 | Tasman | McLean Park, Napier |
| 16:35 NZST | Try: Ere Enari 4'; Brendon O'Connor 14'; Lolagi Visinia 17'; Stacey Ili 29'; Neria Fomai 56'; Con: Lincoln McClutchie (3/5) 15', 30', 58'; Pen: Lincoln McClutchie (0/1); Tiaan Falcon (1/1) 79' | Report | Try: Shannon Frizell 34'; Con: Mitchell Hunt (1/1) 35'; Pen: Mitchell Hunt (5/5) 11', 21', 28', 40', 53' | Referee: James Doleman |

| 23 October 2021 | Hawke's Bay | 41–14 | Waikato | McLean Park, Napier |
| 19:05 NZST | Try: Jacob Devery 2'; Danny Toala 22'; Neria Fomai (2) 62', 77'; Tom Parsons 69'; Ollie Sapsford 73'; Con: Lincoln McClutchie (4/5) 23', 62', 70', 74'; Caleb Makene (0/1); Pen: Lincoln McClutchie (1/1) 54'; Cards: Danny Toala (yellow card) 81' | Report | Try: Steven Misa 16'; Liam Coombes-Fabling 28'; Con: D'Angelo Leuila (2/2) 17', 29'; Pen: D'Angelo Leuila (0/1); Cards: James Tucker (yellow card) 70' | Referee: Nick Briant |

=== 2022 ===
| 29 June 2022 | Hawke's Bay | 38–20 | South Canterbury | McLean Park, Napier |
| 16:35 NZST | Try: Sam Smith 12'; Kienan Higgins 21'; Connor McLeod (2) 37', 57'; Caleb Makene 41'; Paoraian Manuel-Harman 64'; Con: Lincoln McClutchie (3/5) 12', 21', 58'; Sheridan Rangihuna (1/1) 66' | Preview; Report | Try: Vaka Taelega 17'; Paula Fifita 72'; Theo Davidson 81'; Con: Sam Briggs (0/1); Willie Wright (1/1) 74'; Nick Strachan (0/1); Pen: Sam Briggs (1/1) 15' | Referee: Marcus Playle |

| 30 July 2022 | Hawke's Bay | 95–22 | Poverty Bay | McLean Park, Napier |
| 15:05 NZST | Try: Tupou Ma'afu Afungia (3) 2', 29', 33'; Anzelo Tuitavuki (2) 4', 18'; Isaia Walker-Leawere 10'; Ollie Sapsford 20'; Brad Weber 40'; Harry Godfrey 49'; Caleb Makene (2) 55', 68'; Kienan Higgins 63'; Bryn Evans 74'; Josh Gimblett 76'; Sam Smith 80'; Con: Harry Godfrey (10/14) 2', 4', 11', 19', 21', 30', 41', 50', 69', 74'; Danny Toala (0/1) | Preview; Report | Try: Hunter Mokomoko 12'; Mitchell Purvis (2) 25', 81'; Ted Walters 43'; Con: Mitchell Purvis (0/3); Ricardo Patricio (1/1) 82' | Referee: Cameron Stone |

| 12 August 2022 | Hawke's Bay | 33–32 | Counties Manukau | McLean Park, Napier |
| 19:05 NZST | Try: Lincoln McClutchie 8'; Kianu Kereru-Symes 32'; Neria Fomai 35'; Solomone Funaki 40'; Tyrone Thompson 64'; Con: Lincoln McClutchie (4/5) 9', 33', 37', 40+1' | Report | Try: Ahsee Tuala 45'; Cam Roigard 57'; Etene Nanai-Seturo 72'; Ioane Moananu 79'; Con: Riley Hohepa (3/4) 58', 73', 80'; Pen: Riley Hohepa (2/2) 12', 29'; Cards: Sam Tuifua (yellow card) 50' | Referee: Ben O'Keeffe |

| 27 August 2022 | Hawke's Bay | 25–23 | North Harbour | McLean Park, Napier |
| 14:05 NZST | Try: Chase Tiatia 10'; Lolagi Visinia 21'; Kianu Kereru-Symes 75'; Con: Lincoln McClutchie (2/3) 11', 77'; Pen: Lincoln McClutchie (2/2) 44', 70' | Report | Try: Tevita Li (3) 17', 40', 58'; Con: Bryn Gatland (1/3) 40+1'; Pen: Bryn Gatland (2/3) 16', 46'; Cards: Shaun Stevenson (yellow card) 74' | Referee: Angus Mabey |

| 10 September 2022 | Hawke's Bay | 69–24 | Southland | McLean Park, Napier |
| 14:05 NZST | Try: Pouri Rakete-Stones 11'; Tyrone Thompson (3) 16', 32', 50'; Brad Weber 22'; Neria Fomai 45'; Ollie Sapsford (2) 59', 80+3'; Kianu Kereru-Symes (2) 70', 75'; Con: Lincoln McClutchie (7/9) 12', 23', 47', 51', 61', 71', 80+4'; Marino Mikaele-Tu'u (1/1) 76'; Pen: Lincoln McClutchie (1/1) 67' | Report | Try: Rory van Vugt 8'; Robbie Robinson 24'; Viliami Fine 63'; Con: Marty Banks (3/3) 9', 26', 65'; Pen: Marty Banks (1/1) 28' | Referee: Nick Briant |

| 17 September 2022 | Hawke's Bay | 12–19 | Wellington | McLean Park, Napier |
| 19:05 NZST | Pen: Lincoln McClutchie (4/4) 10', 15', 38', 72'; Cards: Joe Apikotoa (yellow card) 40' | Report | Try: TJ Perenara 42'; Con: Aidan Morgan (1/1) 43'; Pen: Aidan Morgan(4/5) 12', 19', 40+1', 52'; Cards: TJ Perenara (yellow card) 80+1' | Attendance: 8,288; Referee: Brendon Pickerill |

| 24 September 2022 | Wellington | 34–6 | Waikato | Sky Stadium, Wellington |
| 16:35 NZST | Try: Pepesana Patafilo 33'; Connor Garden-Bachop 64'; James O'Reilly 73'; Ruben Love 80+2'; Con: Aidan Morgan (1/1) 35'; Jackson Garden-Bachop (3/3) 65', 74', 80+3'; Pen: Aidan Morgan (2/3) 12', 44'; Jackson Garden-Bachop (0/2) | Report | Pen: Damian McKenzie (2/2) 19', 40+2'; Cards: Pita Anae Ah-Sue (yellow card) 51' | Referee: Jonathan Bredin |

=== 2023 ===
| 12 July 2023 | Horowhenua-Kapiti | 7–68 | Wellington | Horowhenua Community Trust Levin Domain, Levin |
| 14:05 NZST | Try: Malaki Masoe 77'; Con: Connor Paki (1/1) 79' | Report | Try: Sione Halalilo 8'; Hugo Plummer 21'; Asafo Aumua 26'; Isi Saumaki (2) 34', 40'; Louis Northcott 45'; Joe Faleafaga 56'; Sam Clarke 63'; Kaliopasi Uluilakepa 71'; Tjay Clarke 74'; Con: Aidan Morgan (9/10) 9', 22', 28', 35', 40+1', 46', 57', 72', 75'; Cards: Asafo Aumua (yellow card) 49' | Referee: Natarsha Ganley |

| 19 July 2023 | Wellington | 67–21 | South Canterbury | Hutt Recreation Ground, Lower Hutt |
| 14:05 NZST | Try: Sione Halalilo 2'; Keelan Whitman 5'; Asafo Aumua (4) 22', 26', 40+2', 48'; Losi Filipo 29'; Isi Saumaki (2) 41', 72'; Tjay Clarke 45'; Pepesana Patafilo 70'; Con: Aidan Morgan (5/9) 6', 27', 30', 40+3', 42'; Tjay Clarke (1/2) 71' | Report | Try: Paula Fifita 35'; Siu Kakala (2) 65', 79'; Con: Sam Briggs (3/3) 36', 66', 80' | Referee: Daniel Waenga |

| 19 August 2023 | Wellington | 39–17 | Southland | Hutt Recreation Ground, Lower Hutt |
| 14:05 NZST | Try: Pepesana Patafilo 17'; Caleb Delany 38'; Riley Higgins 48'; Dominic Ropeti 56'; Connor Garden-Bachop 62'; Josh Southall 80+3'; Con: Tjay Clarke (3/6) 18', 39', 57'; Pen: Tjay Clarke (1/1) 8'; Cards: Dominic Ropeti (yellow card) 27' | Report | Try: Semisi Tupou Ta'eiloa 29'; Leroy Ferguson 71'; Gabriel Hamer-Webb 74'; Con: Greg Dyer (1/3) 29' | Referee: Ben O'Keeffe |

| 23 August 2023 | Wellington | 7–0 | Tasman | Sky Stadium, Wellington |
| 19:05 NZST | Try: James O'Reilly 30'; Con: Aidan Morgan (1/1) 31'; Pen: Aidan Morgan (0/1) | Report | Pen: Tim O'Malley (0/1); Macca Springer (0/1) | Referee: James Doleman |

| 2 September 2023 | Wellington | 56–25 | Counties Manukau | Sky Stadium, Wellington |
| 19:05 NZST | Try: Ruben Love (2) 22', 71'; Kyle Preston 24'; Billy Proctor 33'; Isi Saumaki 36'; Du'Plessis Kirifi 63'; Kemara Hauiti-Parapara 68'; Con: Aidan Morgan (4/5) 25', 34', 38', 65'; Sam Clarke (2/2) 69', 73'; Pen: Aidan Morgan (3/3) 10', 19', 54' | Report | Try: Ioane Moananu 28'; Peniasi Malimali 40'; Liam Daniela 48'; Etene Nanai-Seturo 76'; Con: Riley Hohepa (0/3); AJ Alatimu (1/1) 76'; Pen: Riley Hohepa (1/1) 8'; Cards: Sam Tuifua (yellow card) 68' | Referee: Stuart Curran |

| 24 September 2023 | Wellington | 26–6 | North Harbour | Jerry Collins Stadium, Porirua |
| 14:05 NZST | Try: Losi Filipo 14'; Billy Proctor 28'; Aidan Morgan 44'; Ruben Love 71'; Con: Aidan Morgan (3/4) 16', 29', 72'; Cards: Billy Proctor (yellow card) 68' | Report | Pen: Bryn Gatland (2/2) 25', 40+1' | Referee: Daniel Waenga |

| 30 September 2023 | Wellington | 18–20 | Hawke's Bay | Sky Stadium, Wellington |
| 14:05 NZST | Try: Du'Plessis Kirifi 14'; Penieli Poasa 74'; Con: Aidan Morgan (1/2) 15'; Pen: Aidan Morgan (2/2) 40+1', 63'; Drop: Connor Garden-Bachop (0/1) | Report | Try: Ollie Sapsford 17'; Jonah Lowe 57'; Sam Smith 78'; Con: Lincoln McClutchie (1/3) 79'; Pen: Lincoln McClutchie (1/1) 27' | Referee: Nick Briant |

=== 2024 ===
| 26 June 2024 | Hawke's Bay | 57–7 | King Country | Hawke's Bay Regional Sports Park, Hastings |
| 15:00 NZST | Try: Josh Kaifa 4'; Jonty Stewart 9'; Anzelo Tuitavuki 17'; Tim Farrell 35'; Semi Vodosese 41'; Josh Gimblett 45'; Sam Wye 57'; Hunter Morrison 65'; Kere Penitito 70'; Con: Jonty Stewart (3/4) 5', 9', 35'; Meni Manase (3/5) 42', 58', 66' | | Try: Kaleb Foote 51'; Con: Patrick Hedley (1/1) 52' | Referee: Mike Winter |

| 27 July 2024 | Hawke's Bay | 80–5 | Whanganui | McLean Park, Napier |
| 15:00 NZST | Try: Danny Toala (2) 3', 55'; Joel Hintz 10'; Freedom Vahaakolo 17'; Ben O'Donnell 22'; Tim Farrell 26'; Mat Protheroe (2) 38', 40'; Kere Penitito (2) 65', 71'; Meni Manase 74'; Sam Wye 79'; Con: Harry Godfrey (10/12) 3', 18', 27', 39', 40+2', 55', 66', 72', 75', 80' | Report | Try: Kamipeli Latu 61'; Con: Ethan Robinson (0/1); Cards: Josefa Namosimalua (yellow card) 68' | Referee: Marcus Playle |

| 17 August 2024 | Hawke's Bay | 31–17 | Southland | McLean Park, Napier |
| 16:35 NZST | Try: Mat Protheroe 32'; Nick Grigg 40'; Frank Lochore 59'; Sam Wye 80'; Con: Lincoln McClutchie (1/3) 80+1'; Harry Godfrey (0/1); Pen: Lincoln McClutchie (3/3) 7', 19', 71' | Report | Try: Morgan Mitchell 21'; Isaac Te Tamaki 76'; Con: Byron Smith (1/1) 22'; Jason Robertson (1/1) 77'; Pen: Byron Smith (1/1) 52' | Referee: Stuart Curran |

| 23 August 2024 | Hawke's Bay | 55–30 | Northland | McLean Park, Napier |
| 19:05 NZST | Try: Jacob Devery 21'; Lincoln McClutchie (2) 28', 43'; Ben O'Donnell (2) 34', 52'; Sam Smith (2) 40', 56'; Tyrone Thompson 67'; Mat Protheroe 73’ Con: Lincoln McClutchie (5/8) 22', 29', 40+1', 44', 57'; Harry Godfrey (0/1) | Report | Try: Tevita Latu 24'; Matt Moulds 47'; Sam Nock 64'; Con: Rivez Reihana (3/3) 25', 48', 65'; Pen: Rivez Reihana (3/3) 3', 11', 18' | Referee: Marcus Playle |

| 7 September 2024 | Hawke's Bay | 24–25 | Tasman | McLean Park, Napier |
| 19:05 NZST | Try: Sam Smith 34'; Joe Apikotoa 54'; Ben O'Donnell 63'; Mat Protheroe 76'; Con: Lincoln McClutchie (0/2); Danny Toala (2/2) 65', 78'; Cards: Hugh Renton (yellow card) 22' | Report | Try: Ryan Coxon 10'; Quentin MacDonald 23'; Con: William Havili (0/2); Pen: William Havili (3/3) 3', 37', 61'; Campbell Parata (1/1) 80+2'; Drop: William Havili (1/1) 40+1' | Referee: Angus Mabey |

| 15 September 2024 | Tasman | 28–15 | Wellington | Lansdowne Park, Blenheim |
| 14:05 NZST | Try: Timoci Tavatavanawai 12'; Finlay Christie 59'; Kyren Taumoefolau 72'; Nic Sauira 79'; Con: Campbell Parata (1/3) 73'; Will Butler (0/1); Pen: Campbell Parata (2/3) 33', 48' | Report | Try: Tjay Clarke 51'; Riley Higgins 63'; Con: Jackson Garden-Bachop (1/2) 52'; Pen: Jackson Garden-Bachop (1/1) 38' | Referee: Daniel Waenga |

| 2 October 2024 | Tasman | 31–17 | Auckland | Trafalgar Park, Nelson |
| 19:05 NZST | Try: Timoci Tavatavanawai 12'; Jack Gray 26'; Ryan Coxon 69'; Con: William Havili (2/3) 13', 70'; Pen: William Havili (4/4) 44', 51', 55', 59' | Report | Try: Zarn Sullivan 8'; Caleb Tangitau 80+1'; Con: Harry Plummer (2/2) 9', 80+2'; Pen: Harry Plummer (1/1) 31'; Cards: Zarn Sullivan (yellow card) 25' | Referee: Angus Gardner (Australia) |

| 6 October 2024 | Tasman | 29–42 | Taranaki | Trafalgar Park, Nelson |
| 14:05 NZST | Try: Jack Gray 37'; Tim Sail 44'; Ryan Coxon 57'; David Havili 70'; Con: William Havili (3/4) 45', 58', 70'; Pen: William Havili (1/1) 11' | Report | Try: Daniel Rona (2) 6', 51'; Michael Loft 19'; Jacob Ratumaitavuki-Kneepkens 49'; Adam Lennox 72'; Con: Josh Jacomb (4/5) 7', 20', 50', 73'; Pen: Josh Jacomb (3/3) 15', 28', 40+1' | Referee: Fraser Hannon |

=== 2025 ===
| 11 June 2025 | Taranaki | 78–7 | King Country | Stadium Taranaki, New Plymouth |
| 18:00 NZST | Try: JJ Pokai (2) 11', 25'; Keightley Watson 15'; Brayton Northcott-Hill 21'; Vereniki Tikoisolomone (3) 41', 54', 60'; Adam Lennox (3) 47', 49', 77'; Meihana Grindlay 65'; Jack Wiseman 70'; Con: Brayton Northcott-Hill (6/7) 12', 16', 22', 26', 42', 49'; Jack Wiseman (1/1) 55'; Jack Parker (2/4) 66', 71' | Report | Try: Tom Ryan 38'; Con: Kieron Rollinson (1/1) 39' | Referee: Angus Mabey |

| 19 July 2025 | Taranaki | 97–0 | Thames Valley | Manaia Domain, Manaia |
| 14:00 NZST | Try: Logan Crowley (2) 3', 79'; Bradley Slater 13'; Taniela Rakuro (5) 18', 28', 58', 64', 70'; Michael Loft (2) 25', 40'; Josh Lord 37'; Josh Jacomb 44'; Vereniki Tikoisolomone (2) 52', 68'; Meihana Grindlay 56'; Con: Josh Jacomb (5/8) 4', 19', 29', 38', 45'; Adam Lennox (0/1); Brayton Northcott-Hill (5/5) 57', 59', 65', 69', 71'; Meihana Grindlay (1/1) 80' | Report | | Referee: Stuart Curran |

| 2 August 2025 | Taranaki | 23–3 | Northland | Stadium Taranaki, New Plymouth |
| 19:05 NZST | Try: Vereniki Tikoisolomone 8'; Josh Jacomb 21'; Adam Lennox 44'; Con: Josh Jacomb (1/3) 44'; Pen: Josh Jacomb (2/2) 15', 57' | Report | Pen: Rivez Reihana (1/1) 11' | Referee: Mike Winter |

| 23 August 2025 | Taranaki | 22–23 | Waikato | Stadium Taranaki, New Plymouth |
| 14:05 NZST | Try: Josh Setu 24'; Logan Crowley 42'; Obey Samate 47'; Con: Josh Jacomb (2/3) 43', 48'; Pen: Josh Jacomb (1/1) 63'; Cards: Jesse Parete (yellow card) 10' | Report | Try: Dylan Eti 59'; Xavier Roe 69'; Con: Lima Sopoaga (2/2) 60', 70'; Pen: Aaron Cruden (2/2) 21', 46'; Lima Sopoaga (1/1) 80+1' | Referee: Angus Mabey |

| 31 August 2025 | Waikato | 10–25 | Southland | FMG Stadium Waikato, Hamilton |
| 16:35 NZST | Try: Manaaki Boyle-Tiatia 16'; Con: Lima Sopoaga (1/1) 16'; Pen: Lima Sopoaga (1/1) 21' | Report | Try: Semisi Tupou Ta'eiloa 29'; Nic Shearer 51'; Fletcher Morgan 60'; Con: Byron Smith (2/3) 52', 60'; Pen: Byron Smith (2/2) 5', 48'; Dan Hollinshead (0/1); Drop: Dan Hollinshead (0/1) | Referee: Ben O'Keeffe |

| 6 September 2025 | Southland | 14–54 | Canterbury | Rugby Park, Invercargill |
| 16:05 NZST | Try: Jack Taylor 44'; Sam Fischli 71'; Con: Byron Smith (1/1) 44'; Dan Hollinshead (1/1) 72'; Cards: Faletoi Peni (yellow card) 24' | Report | Try: Corey Kellow 5'; Dallas McLeod (2) 13', 75'; Dominic Gardiner 20'; Louie Chapman (2) 25', 46'; Jamie Hannah 49'; George Bell 66'; Con: James White (7/8) 6', 14', 21', 26', 46', 50', 76'; Cards: Zach Gallagher (yellow card) 72' | Referee: James Doleman |

| 14 September 2025 | Canterbury | 31–25 | Tasman | Apollo Projects Stadium, Christchurch |
| 14:05 NZST | Try: Louie Chapman (2) 8', 34'; Chay Fihaki 39'; Sam Darry 69'; George Bell 80+3'; Con: James White (2/4) 9', 35'; Andrew Knewstubb (1/1) 80+4'; Pen: James White (0/1) | Report | Try: Mitchell Drummond 3'; David Havili 21'; Kyren Taumoefolau 56'; Tomasi Maka 60'; Con: William Havili (1/4) 4'; Pen: William Havili (1/1) 32'; Drop: David Havili (0/1) | Referee: Ben O'Keeffe |

| 20 September 2025 | Canterbury | 36–38 | Otago | Apollo Projects Stadium, Christchurch |
| 16:35 NZST | Try: Torian Barnes 4'; George Bell 14'; Tom Christie 22'; Kurtis MacDonald 31'; Chay Fihaki 50'; Andrew Knewstubb 53'; Con: James White (2/4) 5', 15'; Chay Fihaki (1/2) 51' | Report | Try: Sam Nemec-Vial 18'; Joseva Tamani 26'; Lucas Casey (2) 43', 62'; Jae Broomfield 57'; Liam Coltman 66'; Con: Cam Millar (4/6) 19', 27', 44', 67'; Cards: Will Tucker (yellow card) 60' | Referee: Marcus Playle |

| 27 September 2025 | Otago | 41–26 | North Harbour | Forsyth Barr Stadium, Dunedin |
| 13:05 NZST | Try: Dylan Pledger (2) 2', 61'; Christian Lio-Willie 30'; Liam Coltman 39'; Lucas Casey 57'; Con: Cam Millar (5/5) 3', 31', 40', 58', 62'; Pen: Cam Millar (2/2) 77', 80' | Report | Try: Ben Brownlee 12'; Mark Tele'a 19'; Sofai Maka 71'; Tom Barham 74'; Con: Cameron Howell (3/4) 13', 20', 75' | Referee: Jackson Henshaw |

=== 2026 ===
| 16 June 2026 | Otago | 46–14 | North Otago | Forsyth Barr Stadium, Dunedin |
| 18:30 NZST | Try: Josh Whaanga (2) 4', 47'; Toni Taufa (2) 18', 24'; Harry Irving 29'; Liam Coltman 37'; Riley Lucas 40+1'; Jake Te Hiwi 71'; Con: Rique Miln (1/5) 19'; Mackenzie Palmer (2/3) 40+2', 48'; Cards: Ben Lopas (yellow card) 56' | Report | Try: Kelepi Funaki 57'; Ratu Logavatu 80+4'; Con: Ben McCarthy (1/1) 57'; Isaac Clunie (1/1) 80+5'; Pen: Ben McCarthy (0/1) | Attendance: 2,138; Referee: Jackson Henshaw |

| 24 July 2026 | Otago | 78–14 | Mid Canterbury | Molyneux Park, Alexandra |
| 14:30 NZST | Try: Finn Hurley 1'; Kieran McClea (2) 6', 53'; Charles Elton 11'; Ben Lopas 14'; Cam Millar 19'; Lucas Casey 25'; Sam Nemec-Vial (3) 37', 57', 80+1'; Jona Nareki 49'; Harry Irving 68'; Con: Cam Millar (7/10) 12', 20', 26’, 38', 50', 54', 58'; Mackenzie Palmer (2/2) 69', 80+2'; Cards: Jona Nareki (yellow card) 33'; Marley Pearce (yellow card) 70' | Report | Try: Manasa Samo 46'; Jordy Gray 61'; Con: Ben Innes (2/2) 47', 62' | Referee: Fraser Hannon |

| 9 August 2026 | Otago | 15–19 | Canterbury | Forsyth Barr Stadium, Dunedin |
| 14:05 NZST | Try: Lucas Casey 55'; Ben Lopas 74'; Con: Cam Millar (1/2) 75'; Pen: Cam Millar (1/1) 26' | Report | Try: Brodie McAlister (2) 16', 67'; Jamie Hannah 40+2'; Con: Richie Mo'unga (2/3) 17', 68'; Cards: Manumaua Letiu (yellow card) 54' | Referee: Ben O'Keeffe |

| 15 August 2026 | Canterbury | 33–28 | Bay of Plenty | One NZ Stadium, Christchurch |
| 14:05 NZST | Try: Dallas McLeod (2) 8', 38'; Jone Rova 12'; Ngane Punivai 44'; Toby Bell 71'; Con: Andrew Knewstubb (4/5) 9', 13', 39', 45'; Cards: Johnny McNicholl (yellow card) 25' | Report | Try: Benet Kumeroa (2) 40+6', 56'; Lucas Cashmore 50'; Reon Paul 61'; Con: Jason Robertson (4/4) 40+7', 51', 57', 62' | Referee: James Doleman |

| 20 August 2026 | Canterbury | 12–36 | Northland | One NZ Stadium, Christchurch |
| 19:10 NZST | Try: Tahlor Cahill 12'; Jone Rova 16'; Con: Andrew Knewstubb (1/2) 17' | Report | Try: James Mullan 6'; Marcel Renata 30'; Sam Nock 34'; Rob Rush (2) 44', 80'; Con: Rivez Reihana (4/4) 7', 31', 35', 45'; Rob Rush (0/1); Pen: Rivez Reihana (1/1) 56' | Referee: Jackson Henshaw |

| 30 August 2026 | Northland | 20–10 | Tasman | Semenoff Stadium, Whangārei |
| 17:05 NZST | Try: Jordan Trainor 25'; Rivez Reihana 76'; Con: Rivez Reihana (2/2) 26', 77'; Pen: Rivez Reihana (2/2) 5', 70' | Report | Try: Eli Oudenryn 17'; Con: William Havili (1/1) 18'; Pen: William Havili (1/1) 29'; Cards: Ryan Coxon (yellow card) 74' | Referee: Todd Petrie |

| 12 September 2026 | Northland | 34–17 | Waikato | Semenoff Stadium, Whangārei |
| 17:05 NZST | Try: Lachlan Hooper (2) 15', 64'; Sam Nock 29'; James Ramm 46'; Brady Rush 72'; Con: Rivez Reihana (3/5) 16', 65', 73'; Pen: Rivez Reihana (1/1) 40+1'; Cards: Jordan Trainor (yellow card) 78' | Report | Try: Daniel Sinkinson 21'; Tepaea Cook-Savage 57'; Sean Ralph 79'; Con: Taha Kemara (1/3) 79' | Referee: Fraser Hannon |

| 26 September 2026 | Northland | 19–22 | Counties Manukau | Semenoff Stadium, Whangārei |
| 14:05 NZST | Try: Sam Nock 5'; James Ramm 32'; Corey Evans 62'; Con: Rivez Reihana (2/3) 6', 33' | | Try: Sione Molia 21'; Gibson Popoali'i 54'; Adam Morrison 68'; Con: AJ Alatimu (2/3) 55', 69'; Pen: AJ Alatimu (1/1) 78' | Referee: Paul Williams |

| 3 October 2026 | Counties Manukau | 12–7 | Hawke's Bay | Navigation Homes Stadium, Pukekohe |
| 17:05 NZDT | Try: Adam Brash 11'; Melani Matavao 27'; Con: AJ Alatimu (1/2) 28'; Pen: AJ Alatimu (0/1) | Report | Try: Darby Lancaster 61'; Con: Harry Godfrey (1/1) 62' | Referee: James Doleman |

== Top points and try scorers ==
As of 3 October 2026, when Counties Manukau successfully defended the Shield v Hawke's Bay.

=== Points scorers ===
The following are the top points scorers for all Ranfurly Shield matches between 2020 and 2029:

Top Points Scorers
| No. | Player | Team | T | C | P | DG | Pts |
|---|---|---|---|---|---|---|---|
| 1 | Lincoln McClutchie | Hawke's Bay | 5 | 62 | 18 | 0 | 203 |
| 2 | Aidan Morgan | Wellington | 1 | 25 | 11 | 0 | 88 |
| 3 | Rivez Reihana | Northland | 1 | 14 | 8 | 0 | 57 |
| 4 | Josh Jacomb | Taranaki | 2 | 12 | 6 | 0 | 52 |
| 5 | Cam Millar | Otago | 1 | 17 | 3 | 0 | 48 |
| 6 | Harry Godfrey | Hawke's Bay | 1 | 21 | 0 | 0 | 47 |
| 6 | William Havili | Tasman | 0 | 7 | 10 | 1 | 47 |
| 8 | Neria Fomai | Hawke's Bay | 9 | 0 | 0 | 0 | 45 |
| 9 | Danny Toala | Hawke's Bay | 8 | 2 | 0 | 0 | 44 |
| 10 | Caleb Makene | Hawke's Bay | 4 | 5 | 2 | 0 | 36 |

=== Try scorers ===
The following are the top try scorers for all Ranfurly Shield matches between 2020 and 2029:

Top Try Scorers
| No. | Player | Team | Tries |
|---|---|---|---|
| 1 | Neria Fomai | Hawke's Bay | 9 |
| 2 | Danny Toala | Hawke's Bay | 8 |
| 3 | Josh Kaifa | Hawke's Bay | 6 |
| 3 | Sam Smith | Hawke's Bay | 6 |
| 3 | Vereniki Tikoisolomone | Taranaki | 6 |
| 3 | Anzelo Tuitavuki | Hawke's Bay | 6 |
| 3 | Lolagi Visinia | Hawke's Bay | 6 |
| 8 | Asafo Aumua | Wellington | 5 |
| 8 | Lucas Casey | Otago | 5 |
| 8 | Kianu Kereru-Symes | Hawke's Bay | 5 |
| 8 | Adam Lennox | Taranaki | 5 |
| 8 | Lincoln McClutchie | Hawke's Bay | 5 |
| 8 | Dallas McLeod | Canterbury | 5 |
| 8 | Mat Protheroe | Hawke's Bay | 5 |
| 8 | Taniela Rakuro | Taranaki | 5 |
| 8 | Ollie Sapsford | Hawke's Bay | 5 |
| 8 | Isi Saumaki | Wellington | 5 |
| 8 | Tyrone Thompson | Hawke's Bay | 5 |

== See also ==
- Rugby union in New Zealand
- Hanan Shield
- National Provincial Championship
