= 2021 Bunnings NPC =

2021 rugby union competition in New Zealand

2021 Bunnings NPC season
- Countries: New Zealand
- Date: 6 August – 20 November
- Champions: Waikato
- Runners-up: Tasman
- Matches played: 53
- Tries scored: 353 (average 6.7 per match)
- Top point scorer: Stephen Perofeta (Taranaki); 172 points
- Top try scorer: Leicester Fainga'anuku (Tasman); 8 tries

Official website
- www.provincial.rugby

The 2021 Bunnings NPC season was the 16th season of New Zealand's provincial rugby union competition since it turned professional in 2006. The regular season began on August 6, when Manawatu hosted Counties Manukau. It involved the top 14 rugby unions in New Zealand. For sponsorship reasons, the competition was known as the Bunnings NPC and it was the first season under the lead sponsor and to carry the NPC moniker since 2005. The winner of the Championship, Taranaki wasn't promoted to the Premiership due to a format restructure earlier in the season. Despite finishing seventh in the Premiership, Auckland was not relegated to the Championship, having only played two matches due to a resurgence of COVID-19 in the Auckland Region.

== Format ==
The Bunnings NPC standings were sorted by a competition points system. Four points were awarded to the winning team, a draw equaled two points, whilst a loss amounted to zero points. Unions could also win their side a respectable bonus point. To receive a bonus point, they must have scored four tries or more or lose by seven or fewer points or less. Each team was placed on their total points received. If necessary of a tiebreaker, when two or more teams finish on equal points, the union who defeated the other in a head-to-head got placed higher. In case of a draw between them, the side with the biggest points differential margin got rights to be ranked above. If they were tied on points difference, it was then decided by a highest scored try count or a coin toss. This seeding format was implemented since the beginning of the 2006 competition.

The competition included a promotion-relegation process with the winner of the Championship receiving automatic promotion to the Premiership, replacing the seventh-placed team in the Premiership which was relegated to the Championship for the following year. The regular season consisted of two types of matches. The internal division matches were when each team played the other six unions in their division once, home or away. The cross-division matches were when each team played four teams from the other division, thus missing out on three teams, each from the opposite division. Each union played home or away games against teams from the other division, making a total of ten competition games for each union. The finals format allowed the top four teams from each division move on to the semi-finals. The top two division winners, based on table points, received a home semi-final. In the first round of the finals, the semi-finals, the second division winner hosted the third division winner, and the first division winner hosted the fourth division winner. The final was hosted by the top remaining seed.

== Standings ==
Source: Bunnings NPC standings 2021

Premiership Division
#	Team	GP	W	D	L	PF	PA	PD	TB	LB	AP	PTS
1	RS – Hawke's Bay	8	7	0	1	280	197	+83	6	0	4	38
2	Waikato	9	5	0	4	261	264	–3	6	2	2	30
3	Canterbury	9	5	0	4	228	242	–14	4	2	2	28
4	Tasman	8	5	0	3	240	187	+53	3	1	4	28
5	Wellington	8	3	0	5	270	226	+44	5	4	4	25
6	Bay of Plenty	8	3	0	5	222	252	–30	6	2	4	24
7	Auckland	2	1	0	1	46	40	+6	1	1	2	8

Championship Division
#	Team	GP	W	D	L	PF	PA	PD	TB	LB	AP	PTS
1	Taranaki	8	8	0	0	302	181	+121	3	0	4	39
2	Manawatu	8	4	0	4	239	229	+10	3	1	4	24
3	Otago	7	3	0	4	144	170	–26	0	2	6	20
4	Southland	7	1	0	6	134	222	–88	1	2	6	13
5	Northland	8	1	0	7	167	292	–125	3	1	4	12
6	North Harbour	2	1	0	1	29	34	–5	0	0	2	6
7	Counties Manukau	2	0	0	2	27	53	–26	0	0	2	2

=== Standings progression ===
Premiership
Team	W1	W2	W3	W4	W5	W6	W7	W8	W9	W10
Auckland	5 (3rd)	6 (4th)	6 (7th)	6 (7th)	6 (7th)	6 (7th)	8 (7th)	8 (7th)	8 (7th)	8 (7th)
Bay of Plenty	0 (6th)	5 (6th)	7 (6th)	8 (6th)	13 (5th)	13 (6th)	15 (6th)	15 (6th)	17 (6th)	24 (6th)
Canterbury	0 (5th)	5 (7th)	9 (4th)	13 (4th)	13 (4th)	15 (5th)	18 (5th)	19 (5th)	23 (5th)	28 (3rd)
Hawke's Bay	0 (7th)	5 (5th)	9 (3rd)	14 (2nd)	14 (3rd)	19 (1st)	26 (1st)	31 (1st)	36 (1st)	38 (1st)
Tasman	4 (4th)	8 (2nd)	13 (1st)	13 (3rd)	18 (1st)	18 (2nd)	20 (4th)	20 (4th)	23 (3rd)	28 (4th)
Waikato	5 (2nd)	10 (1st)	11 (2nd)	16 (1st)	17 (2nd)	17 (3rd)	21 (2nd)	21 (3rd)	26 (2nd)	30 (2nd)
Wellington	5 (1st)	7 (3rd)	8 (5th)	9 (5th)	11 (6th)	16 (4th)	21 (3rd)	23 (2nd)	23 (4th)	25 (5th)
Championship
Team	W1	W2	W3	W4	W5	W6	W7	W8	W9	W10
Counties Manukau	0 (6th)	0 (6th)	0 (7th)	0 (7th)	0 (7th)	0 (7th)	2 (7th)	2 (7th)	2 (7th)	2 (7th)
Manawatu	4 (1st)	5 (2nd)	5 (2nd)	9 (2nd)	13 (2nd)	18 (2nd)	20 (2nd)	21 (2nd)	22 (2nd)	24 (2nd)
North Harbour	0 (5th)	4 (3rd)	4 (3rd)	4 (3rd)	4 (4th)	4 (5th)	6 (5th)	6 (5th)	6 (6th)	6 (6th)
Northland	0 (7th)	0 (7th)	1 (6th)	1 (6th)	6 (3rd)	6 (3rd)	8 (4th)	8 (4th)	10 (4th)	12 (5th)
Otago	4 (3rd)	4 (4th)	4 (4th)	4 (4th)	4 (5th)	5 (4th)	11 (3rd)	15 (3rd)	15 (3rd)	20 (3rd)
Southland	1 (4th)	1 (5th)	1 (5th)	2 (5th)	2 (6th)	2 (6th)	4 (6th)	4 (6th)	9 (5th)	13 (4th)
Taranaki	4 (2nd)	9 (1st)	13 (1st)	18 (1st)	18 (1st)	22 (1st)	28 (1st)	33 (1st)	33 (1st)	39 (1st)
The table above shows a team's progression throughout the season. For each week, their cumulative points total is shown with the overall division log position in brackets.
Key:	Win	Draw	Loss	Bye						

== Regular season ==
The 2021 Bunnings NPC was originally scheduled to play across ten weeks. The competition started on Friday, August 6, with Manawatu taking on Counties Manukau at Central Energy Trust Arena. On August 18, New Zealand Rugby announced that all rugby in New Zealand would be postponed due to the COVID-19 pandemic. In September it was confirmed the competition schedule would continue from Week 7 of the original draw. Auckland, Counties Manukau, Manawatu, North Harbour, Otago, and Southland would have byes due to covid restrictions. Therefore all rugby matches scheduled between the 20th and 29 August and 3rd to the 5th of September 2021 was postponed.

On 7 October 2021, it was later revealed the Auckland based teams, Auckland, Counties Manukau, and North Harbour would be withdrawn from the competition after being declined its third travel exemption application. A new draw was released for the remaining four weeks of the season. In addition non-competition matches were implemented so that teams that would have otherwise played Auckland region teams don't go two weeks without a match. These matches will not receive competition points.

=== Week 1 ===
6 August 2021
19:05 NZST

Manawatu	39–21	Counties Manukau
Try: Drew Wild 26'; Brett Cameron 40'; Ray Niuia 76'; Con: Brett Cameron (3/3) 27', 40', 77'; Pen: Brett Cameron (6/9) 7', 14', 33', 47', 53', 70'	Report	Try: Alamanda Motuga 45'; Kalolo Tuiloma 80'; Con: Jarrod Halliday (1/1) 46'; Luteru Laulala (0/1); Pen: Jarrod Halliday (3/3) 4', 32', 37'

Arena Manawatu, Palmerston North
Referee: Angus Mabey

7 August 2021
14:05 NZST

Taranaki	33–19	Hawke's Bay
Try: Bradley Slater (2) 18', 51'; Vereniki Tikoisolomone 80'; Con: Stephen Perofeta (3/3) 19', 52', 80'; Pen: Stephen Perofeta (4/5) 4', 10', 22', 26'	Report	Try: Lincoln McClutchie 31'; Devan Flanders 40'; Ash Dixon 68'; Con: Lincoln McClutchie (1/2) 40'; Tiaan Falcon (1/1) 69'

Pukekura Park, New Plymouth
Referee: Jonathan Bredin

7 August 2021
14:05 NZST

Wellington	54–7	Northland
Try: Taine Plumtree (3) 3', 5', 49'; Peter Umaga-Jensen 35'; Alex Fidow 38'; Julian Savea 61'; Bruce Kauika-Petersen 65'; Brandyn Laursen 73'; Con: Ruben Love (5/6) 4', 6', 36', 39', 50'; Brandyn Laursen (2/2) 66', 74'; Pen: Ruben Love (0/1)	Report	Try: Jordan Olsen 27'; Con: Rivez Reihana (1/1) 28'; Cards: Dan Hawkins (red card) 80'

Wellington Regional Stadium, Wellington
Referee: Tipene Cottrell

7 August 2021
16:35 NZST

Otago	26–19	Southland
Try: Sam Gilbert 16'; Freedom Vahaakolo 79'; Con: Vilimoni Koroi (1/1) 17'; Sam Gilbert (1/1) 80'; Pen: Josh Ioane (1/1) 6'; Vilimoni Koroi (3/3) 39', 62', 66'	Report	Try: Greg Pleasants-Tate 20'; Con: Marty Banks (1/1) 21'; Pen: Marty Banks (4/4) 40', 52', 56', 77'

Forsyth Barr Stadium, Dunedin
Referee: Daniel Waenga

8 August 2021
14:05 NZST

Bay of Plenty	14–27	Tasman
Try: Luke Campbell 27'; Sean Wainui 43'; Con: Kaleb Trask (2/2) 28', 44'; Pen: Kaleb Trask (0/1)	Report	Try: Tim O'Malley 39'; Quentin MacDonald (2) 47', 55'; Con: Mitchell Hunt (3/3) 39', 48', 55'; Pen: Mitchell Hunt (2/2) 18', 31'

Tauranga Domain, Tauranga
Referee: Brendon Pickerill

8 August 2021
14:05 NZST

North Harbour	15–28	Waikato
Try: Bryn Hall 10'; Moses Leo 72'; Con: Bryn Gatland (1/2) 73'; Pen: Bryn Gatland (1/1) 8'	Report	Try: Mosese Dawai (2) 35', 62'; Sekope Lopeti-Moli 44'; Mitch Jacobson 59'; Con: Fletcher Smith (4/4) 37', 45', 60', 64'; Pen: Fletcher Smith (0/1)

North Harbour Stadium, Albany
Referee: Nick Hogan

8 August 2021
16:35 NZST

Auckland	35–24	Canterbury
Try: AJ Lam (3) 3', 23', 34'; Harry Plummer 76'; Con: Harry Plummer (3/4) 24', 36', 77'; Pen: Harry Plummer (3/4) 11', 14', 61'	Report	Try: Manasa Mataele 43'; Corey Kellow 48'; Shilo Klein 72'; Con: Fergus Burke (3/3) 44', 49', 73'; Pen: Fergus Burke (1/1) 32'

Eden Park, Auckland
Referee: Nick Briant

=== Week 2 ===
13 August 2021
19:05 NZST

Counties Manukau	6–14	North Harbour
Pen: Jarrod Halliday (2/3) 44', 68'	Report	Try: Shaun Stevenson 70'; Con: Bryn Gatland (0/1); Pen: Bryn Gatland (3/3) 6', 24', 38'

Navigation Homes Stadium, Pukekohe
Referee: Daniel Waenga

14 August 2021
14:05 NZST

Tasman	16–11	Auckland
Try: Leicester Fainga'anuku 69'; Con: Mitchell Hunt (1/1) 70'; Pen: Mitchell Hunt (3/6) 25', 40', 58'; Cards: Pari Pari Parkinson (yellow card) 80'	Report	Try: Salesi Rayasi 33'; Con: Harry Plummer (0/1); Pen: Harry Plummer (2/3) 8', 31'

Trafalgar Park, Nelson
Referee: Jonathan Bredin

14 August 2021
14:05 NZST

Canterbury	25–22	Manawatu
Try: Chay Fihaki (2) 6', 32'; Shilo Klein 20'; Mitchell Drummond 44'; Con: Fergus Burke (1/4) 33'; Pen: Fergus Burke (1/1) 56'	Report	Try: Logan Henry 4'; Jarred Adams 68'; Shamus Hurley-Langton 75'; Con: Brett Cameron (2/3) 4', 69'; Pen: Brett Cameron (1/1) 25'

Rugby League Park, Christchurch
Referee: Marcus Playle

14 August 2021
16:35 NZST

RS – Hawke's Bay	34–10	Otago
Try: Neria Fomai 29'; Lolagi Visinia 35'; Stacey Ili 52'; Josh Kaifa 65'; Jonah Lowe 80'; Con: Lincoln McClutchie (2/3) 30', 36'; Tiaan Falcon (1/2) 80'; Pen: Tiaan Falcon (1/1) 72'	Report	Try: Freedom Vahaakolo 19'; Con: Vilimoni Koroi (1/1) 20'; Pen: Vilimoni Koroi (1/2) 42'

McLean Park, Napier
Referee: Nick Briant

15 August 2021
14:05 NZST

Waikato	43–37	Wellington
Try: Mosese Dawai 5'; Jack Lam 49'; Ollie Norris 55'; Cortez-Lee Ratima 65'; Liam Messam 68'; Liam Coombes-Fabling 73'; Con: Fletcher Smith (5/6) 50', 56', 66', 69', 74'; Pen: Fletcher Smith (1/1) 11'	Report	Try: Pepesana Patafilo (2) 18', 20'; Du'Plessis Kirifi 26'; Julian Savea 36'; Peter Umaga-Jensen 39'; Con: Ruben Love (3/5) 28', 38', 40'; Pen: Ruben Love (1/3) 9'; Brandyn Laursen (1/1) 60'; Cards: Julian Savea (yellow card) 43'

Waikato Stadium, Hamilton
Referee: Cameron Stone

15 August 2021
14:05 NZST

Southland	11–31	Bay of Plenty
Try: Charles Alaimalo 47'; Con: Greg Dyer (0/1); Pen: Greg Dyer (0/1); Marty Banks (2/2) 60', 67'; Cards: Charles Alaimalo (yellow card) 77'	Report	Try: Mitchell Karpik 22'; Sean Wainui 56'; Onisi Ratave 68'; Nikora Broughton 78'; Con: Kaleb Trask (4/4) 23', 57', 69', 79'; Pen: Kaleb Trask (1/2) 39'

Rugby Park Stadium, Invercargill
Referee: Michael Winter

15 August 2021
16:35 NZST

Northland	14–48	Taranaki
Try: Leka Tu'ungafasi 10'; Kaliopasi Uluilakepa 64'; Con: Rivez Reihana (2/2) 11', 64'; Pen: Rivez Reihana (0/1); Cards: Isi Manu (red card) 43'	Report	Try: Daniel Waite 36'; Ricky Riccitelli 47'; Kini Naholo (2) 52', 70'; Shaan Waite 60'; Daniel Rona 72'; Con: Stephen Perofeta (6/6) 36', 48', 54', 61', 71', 73'; Pen: Stephen Perofeta (2/2) 33', 43'

Okara Park, Whangārei
Referee: Angus Mabey

=== Week 3 ===
17 September 2021
19:05 NZST

Waikato	19–20	Canterbury
Try: Samipeni Finau 40'; Sam Cooper 68'; Tepaea Cook-Savage 80'; Con: Fletcher Smith (2/3) 40', 69'; Pen: Fletcher Smith (0/1)	Report	Try: Waisake Naholo 15'; Henry Stowers 50'; Fergus Burke 73'; Con: Fergus Burke (1/3) 51'; Pen: Fergus Burke (1/1) 64'

Waikato Stadium, Hamilton
Referee: Cameron Stone

18 September 2021
14:05 NZST

Taranaki	32–26	Wellington
Try: Stephen Perofeta 5'; Michael Bent 21'; Jayson Potroz 27'; Con: Stephen Perofeta (1/3) 28'; Pen: Stephen Perofeta (5/6) 37', 43', 49', 59', 66'; Cards: Teihorangi Walden (yellow card) 40'	Report	Try: Wes Goosen 9'; Pepesana Patafilo 40'; Sam Smith 70'; Con: Aidan Morgan (0/2); Ruben Love (1/1) 71'; Pen: Aidan Morgan (3/3) 4', 32', 53'

TET Stadium & Events Centre, Inglewood
Referee: James Doleman

18 September 2021
16:35 NZST

Northland	29–48	Tasman
Try: Sam Nock 9'; Scott Gregory 28'; Kaliopasi Uluilakepa 40'; Jordan Olsen 49'; Raikabula Momoedonu 76'; Con: Rivez Reihana (1/4) 50'; Johnny Cooper (1/1) 77'; Pen: Rivez Reihana (0/1)	Report	Try: Jacob Norris 15'; Leicester Fainga'anuku (2) 23', 60'; Mitchell Hunt 25'; Mark Tele'a (2) 32', 69'; Timoci Tavatavanawai 63'; Shannon Frizell 80'; Con: Mitchell Hunt (4/8) 24', 33', 69', 80'

Okara Park, Whangārei
Referee: Mike Fraser

19 September 2021
14:05 NZST

RS – Hawke's Bay	36–33 (a.e.t.)	Bay of Plenty
Try: Ash Dixon 14'; Solomone Funaki 21'; Pouri Rakete-Stones 31'; Con: Lincoln McClutchie (3/3) 15', 22', 32'; Pen: Lincoln McClutchie (3/3) 29', 37', 63'; Tiaan Falcon (2/2) 80', 80+4'	Report	Try: Emoni Narawa 5'; Luke Campbell 18'; Onisi Ratave (2) 25', 77'; Sean Wainui 59'; Con: Kaleb Trask (2/3) 19', 26'; Otere Black (2/2) 60', 78'; Pen: Kaleb Trask (0/1)

McLean Park, Napier
Referee: Paul Williams

Bye/s: Auckland, Counties Manukau, Manawatu, North Harbour, Otago, and Southland

=== Week 4 ===
24 September 2021
19:05 NZST

Tasman	22–39	Waikato
Try: Leicester Fainga'anuku 52'; Shannon Frizell 67'; Andrew Makalio 72'; Con: Mitchell Hunt (2/3) 52', 68'; Pen: Mitchell Hunt (1/2) 3'	Report	Try: Matthew Lansdown 24'; Liam Coombes-Fabling (2) 27', 77'; Gideon Wrampling 42'; Cortez-Lee Ratima 55'; Con: Fletcher Smith (4/5) 25', 43', 56', 79'; Pen: Fletcher Smith (2/2) 14', 63'; Cards: Steven Misa (yellow card) 31'; Hamilton Burr (yellow card) 66'

Trafalgar Park, Nelson
Referee: Nick Briant

25 September 2021
14:05 NZST

Manawatu	31–19	Northland
Try: Ed Fidow 21'; Brayden Iose 27'; Taniela Filimone 73'; Con: Brett Cameron (2/3) 22', 28'; Pen: Brett Cameron (4/5) 13', 16', 50', 57'	Report	Try: Jone Macilai-Tori 60'; Jonah Mau'u 64'; Kaliopasi Uluilakepa 80'; Con: Rivez Reihana (0/1); Johnny Cooper (2/2) 66', 80'; Cards: Noah Cooper (yellow card) 15'

Arena Manawatu, Palmerston North
Referee: Paul Williams

25 September 2021
16:05 NZST

Southland	16–19 (a.e.t.)	Canterbury
Try: Josh Moorby 14'; Con: Marty Banks (1/1) 16'; Pen: Marty Banks (3/5) 32', 61', 71'; Cards: Chris Apoua (yellow card) 52'	Report	Try: Luke Romano 54'; Con: Fergus Burke (1/1) 55'; Pen: Fergus Burke (4/4) 7', 20', 22', 85'; Jack Debreczeni (0/1)

Rugby Park Stadium, Invercargill
Referee: James Doleman

26 September 2021
14:05 NZST

Wellington	28–31	Hawke's Bay
Try: Vince Aso 67'; Tyrone Thompson (2) 78', 80'; Con: Ruben Love (2/3) 79', 80'; Pen: Aidan Morgan (3/3) 35', 42', 47'	Report	Try: Ash Dixon 10'; Jonah Lowe 21'; Lolagi Visinia 37'; Solomone Funaki 71'; Con: Lincoln McClutchie (3/3) 11', 22', 38'; Tiaan Falcon (1/1) 72'; Pen: Lincoln McClutchie (1/1) 3'

Wellington Regional Stadium, Wellington
Referee: Stuart Curran

26 September 2021
16:35 NZST

Bay of Plenty	28–55	Taranaki
Try: Aidan Ross 26'; Sekuini Tanimo 63'; Viliami Tosi 71'; Chase Tiatia 74'; Con: Otere Black (4/4) 27', 64', 72', 75'	Report	Try: Jacob Ratumaitavuki-Kneepkens (2) 18', 32'; Logan Crowley 40'; Kini Naholo 53'; Vereniki Tikoisolomone (2) 59', 80'; Liam Blyde 65'; Con: Stephen Perofeta (7/7) 19', 33', 40', 54', 60', 66', 80'; Pen: Stephen Perofeta (2/2) 5', 58'

Tauranga Domain, Tauranga
Referee: Mike Fraser

Bye/s: Auckland, Counties Manukau, North Harbour, and Otago

=== Week 5 ===
1 October 2021
19:05 NZST

Northland	38–28	Waikato
Try: Jone Macilai-Tori 16'; Kara Pryor 23'; Sam Nock 38'; Blake Hohaia 46'; Sam McNamara 79'; Con: Dan Hawkins (5/5) 18', 25', 39', 48', 80'; Pen: Dan Hawkins (1/2) 40'	Report	Try: Liam Coombes-Fabling (3) 8', 53', 73'; Mitch Jacobson 43'; Con: Fletcher Smith (4/4) 10', 44', 54', 75'; Cards: D'Angelo Leuila (yellow card) 70'

Okara Park, Whangārei
Referee: Mike Fraser

2 October 2021
14:05 NZST

Bay of Plenty	33–32	Wellington
Try: Alefosio Tapili 16'; Justin Sangster 35'; Leroy Carter 48'; Viliami Tosi 61'; Emoni Narawa 80'; Con: Otere Black (3/4) 17', 36', 80'; Luke Campbell (1/1) 62'	Report	Try: James O'Reilly 19'; Tomasi Alosio 40'; Aidan Morgan 45'; Sam Smith 66'; Tyrone Thompson 71'; Richard Judd 75'; Con: Ruben Love (1/4) 40'; Aidan Morgan (0/2)

Rotorua International Stadium, Rotorua
Referee: Cameron Stone

2 October 2021
16:35 NZST

Manawatu	27–14	Otago
Try: Tima Fainga'anuku 9'; Josiah Maraku 17'; Jarred Adams 42'; Con: Brett Cameron (3/3) 10', 18', 43'; Pen: Brett Cameron (2/4) 30', 57'; Cards: Flyn Yates (yellow card) 65'	Report	Try: Dylan Nel 26'; James Lentjes 66'; Con: Josh Ioane (2/2) 27', 67'

Arena Manawatu, Palmerston North
Referee: Tipene Cottrell

3 October 2021
14:05 NZST

Tasman	51–14	Southland
Try: Timoci Tavatavanawai (2) 2', 8'; Macca Springer 11'; Leicester Fainga'anuku (2) 22', 61'; Levi Aumua 34'; Regan Ware 72'; Con: Mitchell Hunt (5/6) 9', 12', 23', 35', 63'; William Havili (0/1); Pen: Mitchell Hunt (2/2) 27', 32'	Report	Try: Marty Banks 29'; Solomon Alaimalo 43'; Con: Marty Banks (2/2) 30', 44'

Lansdowne Park, Blenheim
Referee: Jonathan Bredin

Bye/s: Auckland, Canterbury, Counties Manukau, Hawke's Bay, North Harbour, and Taranaki

=== Week 6 ===
8 October 2021
19:05 NZST

Wellington	35–30 (a.e.t.)	Canterbury
Try: Peter Umaga-Jensen (2) 2', 82'; Du'Plessis Kirifi 13'; Alex Fidow 80'; Con: Ruben Love (3/3) 3', 14', 80'; Pen: Ruben Love (3/3) 7', 40', 48'; Cards: Alex Fidow (yellow card) 50'	Report	Try: Manasa Mataele (2) 23', 51'; Josh McKay 36'; Chay Fihaki 58'; Con: Fergus Burke (2/4) 37', 53'; Pen: Fergus Burke (2/2) 16', 73'; Cards: Luke Romano (yellow card) 80'

Wellington Regional Stadium, Wellington
Referee: Paul Williams

9 October 2021
16:35 NZST

RS – Hawke's Bay	34–22	Tasman
Try: Ere Enari 4'; Brendon O'Connor 14'; Lolagi Visinia 17'; Stacey Ili 29'; Neria Fomai 56'; Con: Lincoln McClutchie (3/5) 15', 30', 58'; Pen: Lincoln McClutchie (0/1); Tiaan Falcon (1/1) 79'	Report	Try: Shannon Frizell 34'; Con: Mitchell Hunt (1/1) 35'; Pen: Mitchell Hunt (5/5) 11', 21', 28', 40', 53'

McLean Park, Napier
Referee: James Doleman

9 October 2021
19:05 NZST

Otago	23–30	Taranaki
Try: Sio Tomkinson 39'; Dylan Nel 62'; Con: Josh Ioane (2/2) 40', 63'; Pen: Josh Ioane (3/4) 15', 29', 70'; Cards: Sam Fischli (yellow card) 48'	Report	Try: Teihorangi Walden 31'; Pita Gus Sowakula 57'; Liam Blyde 72'; Con: Stephen Perofeta (3/3) 32', 58', 73'; Pen: Stephen Perofeta (3/3) 4', 11', 67'

Forsyth Barr Stadium, Dunedin
Referee: Daniel Waenga

10 October 2021
14:05 NZST

Southland	27–38	Manawatu
Try: Tony Lamborn 22'; Solomon Alaimalo 34'; Matt Whaanga 50'; Con: Marty Banks (3/3) 23', 35', 51'; Pen: Marty Banks (2/3) 5', 7'	Report	Try: Brett Cameron 40'; Ed Fidow (2) 46', 56'; Liam Mitchell 74'; Con: Brett Cameron (3/4) 40', 47', 57'; Pen: Brett Cameron (4/5) 18', 29', 66', 79'

Rugby Park Stadium, Invercargill
Referee: Jonathan Bredin

Bye/s: Auckland, Bay of Plenty, Counties Manukau, North Harbour, Northland, and Waikato

=== Week 7 ===
15 October 2021
19:05 NZST

Northland	13–24	Otago
Try: Sam Nock 15'; Jone Macilai-Tori 37'; Con: Dan Hawkins (0/2); Pen: Dan Hawkins (1/2) 51'	Report	Try: Sio Tomkinson (2) 2', 74'; James Lentjes 6'; Con: Josh Ioane (3/3) 3', 7', 76'; Pen: Josh Ioane (1/1) 10'; Cards: Will Tucker (yellow card) 66'

Rotorua International Stadium, Rotorua
Referee: Michael Winter

16 October 2021
14:05 NZST

Waikato	26–33	Taranaki
Try: Mosese Dawai 15'; James Tucker 18'; Beaudein Waaka 52'; D'Angelo Leuila 68'; Con: Fletcher Smith (3/4) 19', 53', 69'; Pen: Fletcher Smith (0/1); Cards: Cortez-Lee Ratima (yellow card) 75'	Report	Try: Daniel Waite 58'; Kini Naholo 63'; Con: Stephen Perofeta (1/2) 64'; Pen: Stephen Perofeta (7/7) 3', 5', 8', 18', 27', 74', 78'

Tauranga Domain, Tauranga
Referee: Mike Fraser

16 October 2021
16:35 NZST

Canterbury	26–45	Hawke's Bay
Try: Rameka Poihipi 29'; Manasa Mataele 55'; Luke Donaldson 57'; Mitchell Gibson 70'; Con: Fergus Burke (1/1) 30'; Jack Debreczeni (2/3) 58', 70'	Report	Try: Geoff Cridge 21'; Stacey Ili 26'; Lincoln McClutchie 32'; Danny Toala 35'; Josh Kaifa 40'; Jacob Devery 43'; Jonah Lowe 72'; Con: Lincoln McClutchie (4/6) 23', 33', 36', 40'; Tiaan Falcon (1/1) 73'; Pen: Tiaan Falcon (0/1); Cards: Joe Apikotoa (yellow card) 59'

Rugby League Park, Christchurch
Referee: Stuart Curran

16 October 2021
19:05 NZST

Manawatu	16–36	Wellington
Try: Ray Niuia 43'; Con: Brett Cameron (1/1) 44'; Pen: Brett Cameron (3/3) 6', 30', 56'	Report	Try: Peter Umaga-Jensen 2'; Du'Plessis Kirifi 10'; James O'Reilly 48'; Alex Fidow 51'; Ruben Love 77'; Con: Ruben Love (4/5) 4', 49', 53', 79'; Pen: Ruben Love (1/1) 61'

Arena Manawatu, Palmerston North
Referee: Nick Hogan

Bye/s: Auckland, Bay of Plenty, Counties Manukau, North Harbour, Southland, and Tasman

=== Week 8 ===
22 October 2021
19:05 NZST

Otago	22–20	Canterbury
Try: Freedom Vahaakolo 36'; Con: Josh Ioane (1/1) 38'; Pen: Josh Ioane (5/7) 40', 59', 63', 70', 77'	Report	Try: Sam Dickson 20'; Fergus Burke 29'; Con: Fergus Burke (2/2) 21', 31'; Pen: Fergus Burke (1/1) 27'; Alex Harford (1/1) 73'

Forsyth Barr Stadium, Dunedin
Referee: James Doleman

23 October 2021
14:05 NZST

Taranaki	47–35	Manawatu
Try: Penalty try 31'; Liam Blyde (2) 32', 39'; Stephen Perofeta 53'; Vereniki Tikoisolomone 72'; Josh Jacomb 76'; Con: Stephen Perofeta (3/5) 40', 54', 78'; Pen: Stephen Perofeta (3/5) 14', 22', 69'	Report	Try: Josiah Maraku 6'; Tima Fainga'anuku 46'; Ed Fidow 60'; Griffin Culver 63'; Drew Wild 80'; Con: Stewart Cruden (5/5) 7', 47', 61', 64', 80'

TET Stadium & Events Centre, Inglewood
Referee: Daniel Waenga

23 October 2021
19:05 NZST

RS – Hawke's Bay	41–14	Waikato
Try: Jacob Devery 2'; Danny Toala 22'; Neria Fomai (2) 62', 77'; Tom Parsons 69'; Ollie Sapsford 73'; Con: Lincoln McClutchie (4/5) 23', 62', 70', 74'; Caleb Makene (0/1); Pen: Lincoln McClutchie (1/1) 54'; Cards: Danny Toala (yellow card) 80'	Report	Try: Steven Misa 16'; Liam Coombes-Fabling 28'; Con: D'Angelo Leuila (2/2) 17', 29'; Pen: D'Angelo Leuila (0/1); Cards: James Tucker (yellow card) 71'

McLean Park, Napier
Referee: Nick Briant

Bye/s: Auckland, Bay of Plenty, Counties Manukau, North Harbour, Northland, Southland, Tasman, and Wellington

=== Week 9 ===
29 October 2021
19:05 NZST

Canterbury	24–20	Tasman
Try: Fergus Burke 6'; Luke Romano 61'; Dallas McLeod 75'; Con: Fergus Burke (3/3) 7', 62', 76'; Pen: Fergus Burke (1/1) 66'	Report	Try: Quentin MacDonald 51'; Con: Mitchell Hunt (0/1); Pen: Mitchell Hunt (5/5) 10', 32', 40', 46', 57'; Cards: Leicester Fainga'anuku (yellow card) 8'; Sam Matenga (yellow card) 13'

Rugby League Park, Christchurch
Referee: Tipene Cottrell

30 October 2021
14:05 NZST

Southland	37–33	Northland
Try: Josh Moorby 25'; Solomon Alaimalo 30'; Matthew James 48'; Greg Pleasants-Tate 57'; Con: Marty Banks (4/4) 26', 32', 49', 58'; Pen: Marty Banks (3/3) 14', 22', 38'	Report	Try: Pisi Leilua 5'; Dan Hawkins 19'; Rene Ranger 65'; Jone Macilai-Tori 80'; Con: Dan Hawkins (2/4) 21', 65'; Pen: Dan Hawkins (3/3) 3', 40', 45'

Rugby Park Stadium, Invercargill
Referee: Cameron Stone (New Zealand

30 October 2021
16:35 NZST

Bay of Plenty	33–37	Waikato
Try: Lucas Cashmore 25'; Nathan Harris 35'; Joe Webber 45'; Leroy Carter 51'; Emoni Narawa 80'; Con: Lucas Cashmore (4/5) 26', 37', 47', 80'; Cards: Leroy Carter (yellow card) 40'	Report	Try: Cortez-Lee Ratima (2) 8', 42'; Mosese Dawai 40'; Rupeni Tamani 70'; Con: D'Angelo Leuila (4/4) 9', 40', 43', 71'; Pen: D'Angelo Leuila (3/3) 7', 33', 74'; Cards: Hamilton Burr (yellow card) 57'

Tauranga Domain, Tauranga
Referee: Stuart Curran

30 October 2021
19:05 NZST

Manawatu	31–40	Hawke's Bay
Try: Shamus Hurley-Langton 17'; Liam Mitchell 36'; Nehe Milner-Skudder (2) 46', 80'; Con: Brett Cameron (3/3) 19', 37', 47'; Stewart Cruden (1/1) 80'; Pen: Brett Cameron (1/1) 31'	Report	Try: Ollie Sapsford (3) 24', 34', 50'; Pouri Rakete-Stones 60'; Kienan Higgins (2) 66', 71'; Con: Lincoln McClutchie (1/2) 25'; Caleb Makene (4/4) 51', 61', 67', 72'

Arena Manawatu, Palmerston North
Referee: Daniel Waenga

Bye/s: Auckland, Counties Manukau, North Harbour, Otago, Taranaki, and Wellington

=== Week 10 ===
3 November 2021
19:05 NZST

Bay of Plenty	22–14	Northland
Try: Peni Lasaqa (2) 4', 24'; Manaaki Selby-Rickit 59'; Nathan Harris 64'; Con: Lucas Cashmore (1/4) 65'; Cards: Cassius Misa (yellow card) 48'; Viliami Tosi (yellow card) 79'	Report	Try: Blake Hohaia 36'; Justin Davies 80'; Con: Rivez Reihana (1/1) 37'; Dan Hawkins (1/1) 80'; Cards: Blake Hohaia (yellow card) 22'

Rotorua International Stadium, Rotorua
Referee: Tipene Cottrell

5 November 2021
19:05 NZST

Waikato	27–25	Otago
Try: James Thompson 40'; Ryan Tongia 55'; James Tucker 71'; Con: D'Angelo Leuila (3/3) 40', 56', 72'; Pen: D'Angelo Leuila (2/2) 29', 36'	Report	Try: Freedom Vahaakolo (2) 14', 47'; Matt Faddes 63'; Con: Josh Ioane (2/3) 48', 65'; Pen: Josh Ioane (2/3) 33', 38'; Cards: Sam Fischli (red card) 28'

Rotorua International Stadium, Rotorua
Referee: Nick Briant

6 November 2021
14:05 NZST

Tasman	34–22	Wellington
Try: Quentin MacDonald 7'; Jacob Norris 13'; Leicester Fainga'anuku 17'; Levi Aumua 25'; Anton Segner 80'; Con: Mitchell Hunt (3/5) 18', 26', 80'; Pen: Mitchell Hunt (1/1) 39'	Report	Try: Taine Plumtree 28'; Jackson Garden-Bachop 45'; Tyrone Thompson 74'; Con: Aidan Morgan (2/3) 30', 46'; Pen: Aidan Morgan (1/1) 53'

Lansdowne Park, Blenheim
Referee: Cameron Stone

6 November 2021
16:35 NZST

Canterbury	40–28	Bay of Plenty
Try: Chay Fihaki 3'; Dallas McLeod (2) 7', 27'; Waisake Naholo (2) 37', 51'; Con: Fergus Burke (3/5) 4', 7', 52'; Pen: Fergus Burke (2/4) 59', 80'; Chay Fihaki (1/1) 72'	Report	Try: Leroy Carter 10'; Veveni Lasaqa 20'; Lucas Cashmore 48'; Con: Lucas Cashmore (2/3) 11', 49'; Pen: Lucas Cashmore (3/3) 15', 26', 30'

Rugby League Park, Christchurch
Referee: Jonathan Bredin

7 November 2021
14:05 NZST

Taranaki	24–10	Southland
Try: Kini Naholo 28'; Jacob Ratumaitavuki-Kneepkens 53'; Vereniki Tikoisolomone 59'; Con: Stephen Perofeta (3/3) 30', 55', 60'; Pen: Stephen Perofeta (1/1) 40'	Report	Try: Charles Alaimalo 6'; Con: Greg Dyer (1/1) 7'; Pen: Greg Dyer (1/1) 18'

TET Stadium & Events Centre, Inglewood
Referee: Stuart Curran

Bye/s: Auckland, Counties Manukau, Hawke's Bay, Manawatu, and North Harbour

== Play-offs ==
Semi-finals
1	Taranaki	25
4	Southland	13
2	Manawatu	16
3	Otago	44

Final
1	Taranaki	32
3	Otago	19

Semi-finals
2	Waikato	17
3	Canterbury	14
1	Hawke's Bay	27
4	Tasman	33

Final
2	Waikato	23
4	Tasman	20

=== Semi-finals ===
==== Championship ====
12 November 2021
19:05 NZST

Manawatu	16–44	Otago
Try: Brayden Iose 63'; Josiah Maraku 79'; Con: Drew Wild (0/2); Pen: Stewart Cruden (2/3) 26', 44'	Report	Try: Josh Hill 38'; Sam Gilbert 46'; Vilimoni Koroi 52'; Freedom Vahaakolo (2) 67', 74'; Con: Josh Ioane (4/4) 40', 47', 53', 68'; Cameron Millar (1/1) 75'; Pen: Josh Ioane (3/4) 10', 18', 61'

Arena Manawatu, Palmerston North
Referee: Nick Hogan

13 November 2021
14:05 NZST

Taranaki	25–13	Southland
Try: Tom Florence 4'; Logan Crowley 10'; Con: Stephen Perofeta (0/2); Pen: Stephen Perofeta (5/6) 18', 27', 54', 70', 75'	Report	Try: Rory van Vugt 49'; Con: Marty Banks (1/1) 50'; Pen: Marty Banks (2/3) 15', 22'; Cards: Isaac Te Tamaki (yellow card) 80'

TET Stadium & Events Centre, Inglewood
Referee: Jonathan Bredin

==== Premiership ====
13 November 2021
16:35 NZST

Hawke's Bay	27–33	Tasman
Try: Jonah Lowe 12'; Tom Parsons 20'; Marino Mikaele-Tu'u 40'; Geoff Cridge 50'; Con: Lincoln McClutchie (2/4) 22', 52'; Pen: Lincoln McClutchie (1/1) 65'	Report	Try: Andrew Makalio 9'; Andrew Knewstubb 23'; Timoci Tavatavanawai 28'; Leicester Fainga'anuku 69'; Con: Mitchell Hunt (2/4) 8', 25'; Pen: Mitchell Hunt (3/3) 4', 17', 75'

McLean Park, Napier
Referee: Nick Briant

13 November 2021
19:05 NZST

Waikato	17–14	Canterbury
Try: Rhys Marshall 28'; Bailyn Sullivan 38'; Con: D'Angelo Leuila (2/2) 29', 39'; Pen: D'Angelo Leuila (1/2) 54'	Report	Try: Corey Kellow 45'; Con: Fergus Burke (0/1); Pen: Chay Fihaki (0/1); Fergus Burke (3/3) 25', 59', 65'

Rotorua International Stadium, Rotorua
Referee: Daniel Waenga

=== Finals ===
==== Championship ====
20 November 2021
14:05 NZST

Taranaki	32–19	Otago
Try: Jared Proffit 4'; Daniel Waite 19'; Mickey Woolliams 39'; Kini Naholo 43'; Con: Stephen Perofeta (3/4) 5', 20', 45'; Pen: Stephen Perofeta (2/4) 32', 47'; Jayson Potroz (0/1); Cards: Jayson Potroz (yellow card) 51'	Report	Try: Josh Hill 6'; Vilimoni Koroi 33'; Josh Ioane 54'; Con: Josh Ioane (2/3) 7', 55'

TET Stadium & Events Centre, Inglewood
Referee: Stuart Curran

==== Premiership ====
20 November 2021
19:05 NZST

Waikato	23–20	Tasman
Try: Bailyn Sullivan (2) 33', 48'; Con: D'Angelo Leuila (2/2) 33', 50'; Pen: D'Angelo Leuila (2/3) 9', 40'; Fletcher Smith (1/1) 72'	Report	Try: Regan Ware 27'; Quinten Strange 67'; Con: Mitchell Hunt (2/2) 28', 68'; Pen: Mitchell Hunt (2/3) 38', 46'

Waikato Stadium, Hamilton
Referee: Nick Briant

FB	15	Ryan Tongia
RW	14	Liam Coombes-Fabling
OC	13	Bailyn Sullivan
IC	12	Gideon Wrampling
LW	11	Mosese Dawai	(substituted off) 51'
FH	10	D'Angelo Leuila	(substituted off) 58'
SH	9	Cortez-Lee Ratima	(substituted off) 72'
N8	8	Jack Lam	(substituted off) 80'
OF	7	Mitch Jacobson
BF	6	Samipeni Finau
RL	5	Hamilton Burr	(substituted off) 67'
LL	4	James Tucker
TP	3	George Dyer	(substituted off) 41'	(substituted on) 51'	(substituted off) 61'
HK	2	Rhys Marshall	(substituted off) 61'
LP	1	Ayden Johnstone (c)	(substituted off) 53'
Replacements:
HK	16	Steven Misa	(substituted on) 61'
PR	17	Ollie Norris	(substituted on) 53'
PR	18	Sefo Kautai	(substituted on) 41'	(substituted off) 51'	(substituted on) 61'
LK	19	Rupeni Tamani	(substituted on) 80'
FL	20	Liam Messam	(substituted on) 67'
SH	21	Te Toiroa Tahuriorangi	(substituted on) 72'
FH	22	Fletcher Smith	(substituted on) 58'
FB	23	Beaudein Waaka	(substituted on) 51'

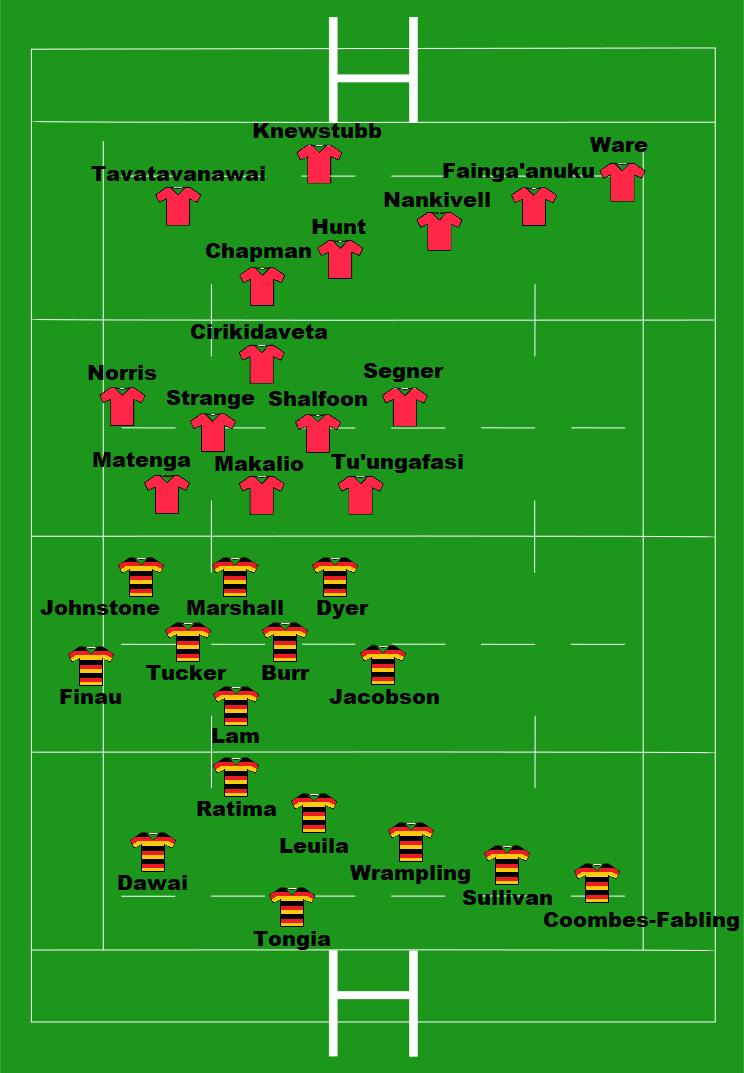

FB	15	Andrew Knewstubb
RW	14	Timoci Tavatavanawai	(substituted off) 65'
OC	13	Leicester Fainga'anuku
IC	12	Alex Nankivell
LW	11	Regan Ware	(substituted off) 78'
FH	10	Mitchell Hunt
SH	9	Louie Chapman	(substituted off) 78'
N8	8	Te Ahiwaru Cirikidaveta	(substituted off) 65'
OF	7	Anton Segner
BF	6	Jacob Norris
RL	5	Quinten Strange (c)
LL	4	Antonio Shalfoon	(substituted off) 65'
TP	3	Sam Matenga	(substituted off) 56'
HK	2	Andrew Makalio	(substituted off) 52'
LP	1	Isi Tu'ungafasi	(substituted off) 51'
Replacements:
HK	16	Quentin MacDonald	(substituted on) 52'
PR	17	Luca Inch	(substituted on) 51'
PR	18	Isaac Salmon	(substituted on) 56'
LK	19	Max Hicks	(substituted on) 65'
FL	20	Hugh Renton	(substituted on) 65'
SH	21	Noah Hotham	(substituted on) 78'
WG	22	Macca Springer	(substituted on) 78'
CE	23	Levi Aumua	(substituted on) 65'

== Statistics ==
=== Leading point scorers ===
No.	Player	Team	Points	Average	Details
1	Stephen Perofeta	Taranaki	172	17.20	2 T, 30 C, 34 P, 0 D
2	Mitchell Hunt	Tasman	123	12.30	1 T, 23 C, 24 P, 0 D
3	Brett Cameron	Manawatu	107	15.29	2 T, 17 C, 21 P, 0 D
4	Fergus Burke	Canterbury	97	9.70	3 T, 17 C, 16 P, 0 D
5	Josh Ioane	Otago	82	10.25	1 T, 16 C, 15 P, 0 D
6	Marty Banks	Southland	77	9.63	1 T, 12 C, 16 P, 0 D
7	Lincoln McClutchie	Hawke's Bay	77	8.56	2 T, 23 C, 7 P, 0 D
8	Ruben Love	Wellington	58	7.25	1 T, 19 C, 5 P, 0 D
9	Fletcher Smith	Waikato	56	5.60	0 T, 22 C, 4 P, 0 D
10	D'Angelo Leuila	Waikato	55	5.00	1 T, 13 C, 8 P, 0 D

Source: The weekly reviews of the matches published on provincial.rugby (see "Report" in the individual match scoring stats).

=== Leading try scorers ===
No.	Player	Team	Tries	Average
1	Leicester Fainga'anuku	Tasman	8	0.80
2	Freedom Vahaakolo	Otago	7	0.78
3	Liam Coombes-Fabling	Waikato	7	0.64
4	Kini Naholo	Taranaki	6	0.67
5	Peter Umaga-Jensen	Wellington	5	0.63
6	Mosese Dawai	Waikato	5	0.50
7	Vereniki Tikoisolomone	Taranaki	5	0.50
8	Taine Plumtree	Wellington	4	0.67
9	Tyrone Thompson	Wellington	4	0.67
10	Jone Macilai-Tori	Northland	4	0.57

Source: The weekly reviews of the matches published on provincial.rugby (see "Report" in the individual match scoring stats).

=== Points by week ===
Team	1		2		3		4		5		6		7		8		9		10		Total		Average	
Auckland	35	24	11	16	0	0	0	0	0	0	0	0	0	0	0	0	0	0	0	0	46	40	23.00	20.00
Bay of Plenty	14	27	31	11	33	36	28	55	33	32	0	0	0	0	0	0	33	37	50	54	222	252	27.75	31.50
Canterbury	24	35	25	22	20	19	19	16	0	0	30	35	26	45	20	22	24	20	40	28	228	242	25.33	26.89
Counties Manukau	21	39	6	14	0	0	0	0	0	0	0	0	0	0	0	0	0	0	0	0	27	53	13.50	26.50
Hawke's Bay	19	33	34	10	36	33	31	28	0	0	34	22	45	26	41	14	40	31	0	0	280	197	35.00	24.63
Manawatu	39	21	22	25	0	0	31	19	27	14	38	27	16	36	35	47	31	40	0	0	239	229	29.88	28.63
North Harbour	15	28	14	6	0	0	0	0	0	0	0	0	0	0	0	0	0	0	0	0	29	34	14.50	17.00
Northland	7	54	14	48	29	48	19	31	38	28	0	0	13	24	0	0	33	37	14	22	167	292	20.88	36.50
Otago	26	19	10	34	0	0	0	0	14	27	23	30	24	13	22	20	0	0	25	27	144	170	20.57	24.29
Southland	19	26	11	31	0	0	16	19	14	51	27	38	0	0	0	0	37	33	10	24	134	222	19.14	31.71
Taranaki	33	19	48	14	32	26	55	28	0	0	30	23	33	26	47	35	0	0	24	10	302	181	37.75	22.63
Tasman	27	14	16	11	48	29	22	39	51	14	22	34	0	0	0	0	20	24	34	22	240	187	30.00	23.38
Waikato	28	15	43	37	19	20	39	22	28	38	0	0	26	33	14	41	37	33	27	25	261	264	29.00	29.33
Wellington	54	7	37	43	26	32	28	31	32	33	35	30	36	16	0	0	0	0	22	34	270	226	33.75	28.25

Source: Bunnings NPC Fixtures and Results 2021

=== Tries by week ===
Team	1		2		3		4		5		6		7		8		9		10		Total		Average	
Auckland	4	3	1	1	0	0	0	0	0	0	0	0	0	0	0	0	0	0	0	0	5	4	2.50	2.00
Bay of Plenty	2	3	4	1	5	3	4	7	5	6	0	0	0	0	0	0	5	4	7	7	32	31	4.00	3.88
Canterbury	3	4	4	3	3	3	1	1	0	0	4	4	4	7	2	1	3	1	5	3	29	27	3.22	3.00
Counties Manukau	2	3	0	1	0	0	0	0	0	0	0	0	0	0	0	0	0	0	0	0	2	4	1.00	2.00
Hawke's Bay	3	3	5	1	3	5	4	3	0	0	5	1	7	4	6	2	6	4	0	0	39	23	4.88	2.88
Manawatu	3	2	3	4	0	0	3	3	3	2	4	3	1	5	5	6	4	6	0	0	26	31	3.25	3.88
North Harbour	2	4	1	0	0	0	0	0	0	0	0	0	0	0	0	0	0	0	0	0	3	4	1.50	2.00
Northland	1	8	2	6	5	8	3	3	5	4	0	0	2	3	0	0	4	4	2	4	24	40	3.00	5.00
Otago	2	1	1	5	0	0	0	0	2	3	2	3	3	2	1	2	0	0	3	3	14	19	2.00	2.71
Southland	1	2	1	4	0	0	1	1	2	7	3	4	0	0	0	0	4	4	1	3	13	25	1.86	3.57
Taranaki	3	3	6	2	3	3	7	4	0	0	3	2	2	4	6	5	0	0	3	1	33	24	4.13	3.00
Tasman	3	2	1	1	8	5	3	5	7	2	1	5	0	0	0	0	1	3	5	3	29	26	3.63	3.25
Waikato	4	2	6	5	3	3	5	3	4	5	0	0	4	2	2	6	4	5	3	3	35	34	3.89	3.78
Wellington	8	1	5	6	3	3	3	4	6	5	4	4	5	1	0	0	0	0	3	5	37	29	4.63	3.63

For	Against

Source: The weekly reviews of the matches published on provincial.rugby (see "Report" in the individual match scoring stats).

=== Sanctions ===
Player	Team	Red	Yellow	Sent off match(es)
Sam Fischli	Otago	1	1	vs Taranaki and Waikato
Dan Hawkins	Northland	1	0	vs Wellington
Isi Manu	Northland	1	0	vs Taranaki
Hamilton Burr	Waikato	0	2	vs Tasman and Bay of Plenty
Pari Pari Parkinson	Tasman	0	1	vs Auckland
Julian Savea	Wellington	0	1	vs Waikato
Charles Alaimalo	Southland	0	1	vs Bay of Plenty
Teihorangi Walden	Taranaki	0	1	vs Wellington
Steven Misa	Waikato	0	1	vs Tasman
Noah Cooper	Northland	0	1	vs Manawatu
Chris Apoua	Southland	0	1	vs Canterbury
D'Angelo Leuila	Waikato	0	1	vs Northland
Flyn Yates	Manawatu	0	1	vs Otago
Alex Fidow	Wellington	0	1	vs Canterbury
Luke Romano	Canterbury	0	1	vs Wellington
Will Tucker	Otago	0	1	vs Northland
Cortez-Lee Ratima	Waikato	0	1	vs Taranaki
Joe Apikotoa	Hawke's Bay	0	1	vs Canterbury
James Tucker	Waikato	0	1	vs Hawke's Bay
Danny Toala	Hawke's Bay	0	1	vs Waikato
Leicester Fainga'anuku	Tasman	0	1	vs Canterbury
Sam Matenga	Tasman	0	1	vs Canterbury
Leroy Carter	Bay of Plenty	0	1	vs Waikato
Cassius Misa	Bay of Plenty	0	1	vs Northland
Viliami Tosi	Bay of Plenty	0	1	vs Northland
Blake Hohaia	Northland	0	1	vs Bay of Plenty
Isaac Te Tamaki	Southland	0	1	vs Taranaki
Jayson Potroz	Taranaki	0	1	vs Otago

== Ranfurly Shield ==
=== Pre-season challenges ===
For the 2021 pre-season, Hawke's Bay accepted Ranfurly Shield challenges from North Otago and Ngāti Porou East Coast. In their first defence on June 30, Hawke's Bay defeated North Otago 85–0 in Napier. The side scored 13 tries to none. It began with a try to Kienan Higgins on debut from a turnover after four minutes. North Otago then conceded a penalty try and lost lock Manulua Taiti to a yellow card. Hawke’s Bay added a further two tries from Jason Long to lead 28–0 after the first quarter. Another two tries in the last eight minutes gave Hawke's Bay a 42-point lead at halftime. Hawke's Bay also gave a debut to All Black family member Sir Brian Lochore's grandson, Frank Lochore.

In Hawke's Bay's second defence of the year they scored 15 tries to win 93–5 against Ngāti Porou East Coast. Hawke's Bay number 8 Gareth Evans opened the scoring off due to lineout maul five minutes into the first half. Hawke's Bay had their second try through Josh Kaifa after some good runs from Anzelo Tuitavuki and Dennon Robinson-Bartlett on either wing, then fullback Danny Toala crossed over to make it 17–0 inside 15 minutes. Kaifa, Toala, Tuitavuki, Lincoln McClutchie and replacement prop Pouri Rakete-Stones all crossed for doubles, with McClutchie kicking nine conversions in a personal tally of 28 points. Ngāti Porou East Coast were coached by former New Zealand international Hosea Gear and scored their only try to hooker Jorian Tangaere in the thirtieth minute.

30 June 2021
19:05 NZST

Hawke's Bay	85–0	North Otago
Try: Kienan Higgins 4'; Penalty try 10'; Jason Long (2) 18', 22'; Lolagi Visinia (2) 32', 52'; Tom Parsons 40'; Jacob Devery 43'; Anzelo Tuitavuki 46'; Josh Kaifa (2) 58', 77'; Danny Toala 68'; Namatahi Waa 72'; Con: Lincoln McClutchie (9/11) 5', 19', 23', 33', 40', 44', 47', 73', 77'; Danny Toala (0/1)	Preview; Report

McLean Park, Napier
Referee: Michael Winter

24 July 2021
15:00 NZST

Hawke's Bay	93–5	Ngāti Porou East Coast
Try: Gareth Evans 5'; Josh Kaifa (2) 10', 41'; Danny Toala (2) 14', 51'; Anzelo Tuitavuki (2) 21', 46'; Kianu Kereru-Symes 26'; Dennon Robinson-Bartlett 34'; Namatahi Waa 39'; Lincoln McClutchie (2) 57', 72'; Pouri Rakete-Stones (2) 62', 74'; Elijah Martin 64'; Con: Lincoln McClutchie (9/15) 6', 22', 40', 47', 58', 63', 65', 73', 75'	Preview; Report	Try: Jorian Tangaere 30'; Con: Te Rangi Fraser (0/1)

McLean Park, Napier
Referee: Stuart Curran
