= Charles Alaimalo =

New Zealand rugby union player (born 1999)

- Born: 14 June 1999 (age 27) New Zealand
- Height: 1.99 m (6 ft 6 in)
- Weight: 110 kg (17 st 5 lb; 243 lb)
- Notable relative: Solomon Alaimalo (brother)

Rugby union career
- Position: Flanker
- Current team: Zebre
Youth career
- Hamilton Boys High School, New Zealand Schools: Hamilton Marist 2018
Senior career
Years	Team	Apps	(Points)
2018-2019–2020-2021-2022-2023-2024	Southland	55	(60)
2021-2025	Zebre	62	(75)
- Correct as of 19 Mar 2021

Charles Alaimalo (born 14 June 1999 in New Zealand) is a New Zealand professional rugby union player. His usual position is as a Flanker and he currently plays for Southland in the NPC.

Alaimalo represented Southland in the mitre 10 cup 2019, 2020, 2021, 2022, 2023 Mitre 10 Cups, scoring 12 tries in 55 appearances Alaimalo is also playing for zebre in the URC appearing 62 times and scoring 14 tries In March 2021, he joined Italian side Zebre for the remainder of the 2020–21 Pro14 season and Pro14 Rainbow Cup.

He is the brother of Highlanders winger Solomon Alaimalo.
