= Woolliams =

Woolliams is a surname. Notable people with the surname include:

- Anne Woolliams (1926–1999), English artistic director, ballet choreographer, dancer and teacher
- Eldon Woolliams (1916–2001), Canadian politician and lawyer
- Mickey Woolliams (born 1996), New Zealand rugby player
