= Timoci Tavatavanawai =

Fijian Rugby player

- Born: 14 February 1998 (age 28) Nausori, Fiji
- Height: 175 cm (5 ft 9 in)
- Weight: 106 kg (234 lb; 16 st 10 lb)
- School: Queen Victoria School

Rugby union career
- Position(s): Wing, Centre
- Current team: Tasman, Highlanders
Senior career
Years	Team	Apps	(Points)
2021–	Tasman	43	(90)
2022–2023	Moana Pasifika	20	(35)
2024–	Highlanders	42	(45)
- Correct as of 8 November 2026
International career
Years	Team	Apps	(Points)
- Fiji U20
2025–	New Zealand	4	(0)
- Correct as of 8 November 2026

Timoci Tavatavanawai Tabaleka (born 14 February 1998) is a Fijian born New Zealand rugby union player who plays for Tasman in the Bunnings NPC and the Highlanders in Super Rugby. He plays mostly in the wing position but can also play centre.

== Career ==
Born and raised in Fiji, Tavatavanawai played for the Fiji national under-20 rugby union team before moving to New Zealand where he started playing for the Central Rugby Club in the Marlborough Region. He was part of both the Crusaders and Highlanders wider squads during the 2021 Super Rugby season. He was named in the Tasman Mako squad for the 2021 Bunnings NPC. Tavatavanawai made his debut for Tasman in Round 1 of the competition against Bay of Plenty, starting at number 14 in a 14–27 win for the Mako. After a very impressive first 7 games for Tasman Tavatavanawai was signed by Moana Pasifika in October 2021 for the 2022 Super Rugby Pacific season. Tasman went on to make the final before losing 23–20 to Waikato. Tavatavanawai made his debut for Moana Pasifika, starting at number 11 in Round 7 of the 2022 season against the Blues. After 20 games for Moana, Tavatavanawai signed with the Highlanders for 2 years and was named as captain alongside Hugh Renton for the 2025 Super Rugby Pacific season.
