= Cortez Ratima =

New Zealand rugby union player

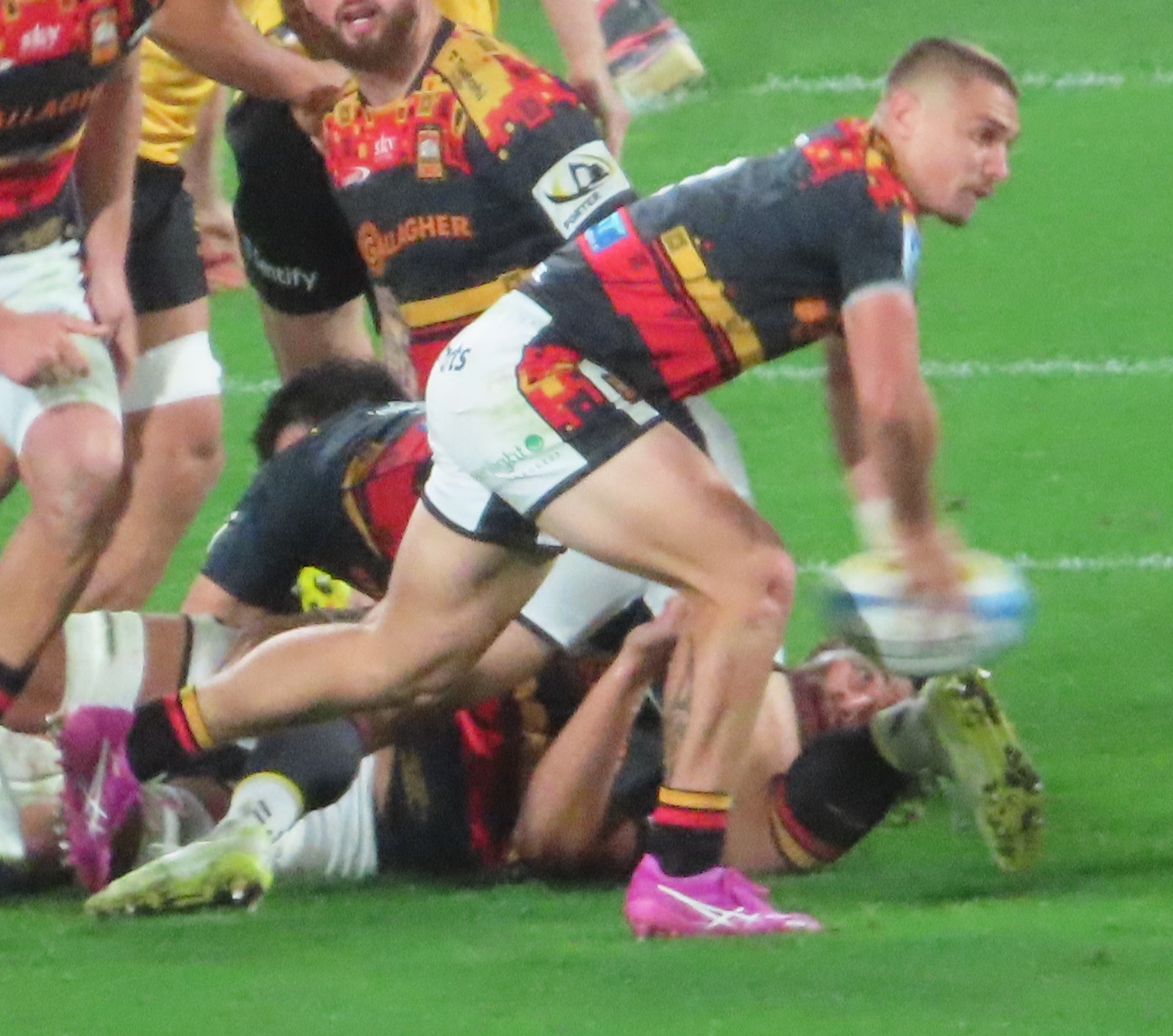
- Ratima playing for the Chiefs in the 2026 Super Rugby Pacific final
- Full name: Cortez-Lee Peter Ratima
- Born: 22 March 2001 (age 25) Piopio, New Zealand
- Height: 1.79 m (5 ft 10 in)
- Weight: 87 kg (192 lb; 13 st 10 lb)
- School: Hamilton Boys' High School

Rugby union career
- Position: Half-back
- Current team: Waikato, Chiefs
Senior career
Years	Team	Apps	(Points)
2020–	Waikato	40	(45)
2022–	Chiefs	74	(120)
- Correct as of 3 October 2026
International career
Years	Team	Apps	(Points)
2022	All Blacks XV	1	(0)
2024–	New Zealand	28	(10)
- Correct as of 21 November 2026

Cortez-Lee Peter Ratima (born 22 March 2001) is a New Zealand rugby union player who plays as a halfback for the Chiefs in Super Rugby, Waikato in the National Provincial Championship (NPC), and the All Blacks.

== Early life ==
Ratima was born in the King Country area of New Zealand's North Island in 2001. His name, Cortez, comes from the 1972 Nike shoe of the same name because of his father's collection of the shoe. He was raised on a farm in Piopio and attended Piopio Primary School and College in his youth and briefly attended New Plymouth Boys' High School on the North Island's western coastal region of Taranaki before relocating to Hamilton in the adjacent region to the north, Waikato. Ratima finished his education at Hamilton Boys High School (HBHS) and was a regular representative of Waikato through all grades and was a part of the schools' first XV. Ratima also represented the Waikato Chiefs U18s and New Zealand Māori U18s before eventually playing for the Waikato Rugby Academy at 17-years-old.

== Club career ==
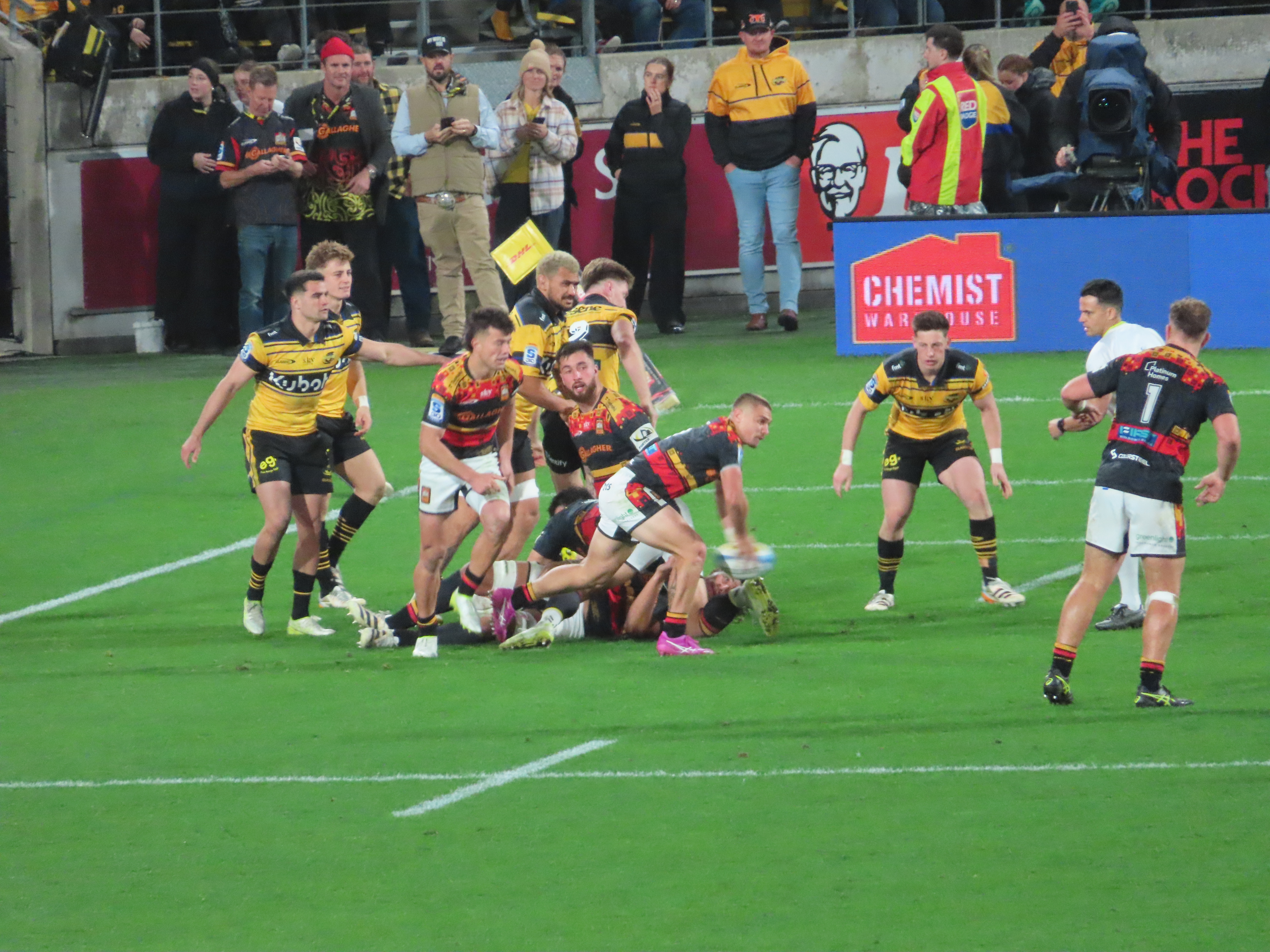
Ratima playing in the 2026 Super Rugby Pacific final with the Chiefs.

He was named in the Chiefs squad for the 2022 Super Rugby Pacific season. He was also a member of the Waikato 2021 Bunnings NPC squad.

== International career ==
He made his international test debut against England on 13 July 2024. He scored his first international try against Fiji on the 19th July 2024.
