= Paul Renton =

- Born: Paul John Renton; 15 September 1962
- Died: 2 August 2017 (aged 54) Mangatahi, Hawke's Bay, New Zealand
- School: Rathkeale College
- Notable relative: Hugh Renton (son)
- Occupation: Farmer

Rugby union career
- Position: Flanker
Provincial / State sides
Years	Team	Apps	(Points)
1983	Manawatu	1	(0)
1984–85	Mid Canterbury	21	(16)
1986–89	Hawke's Bay	44	(44)
International career
Years	Team	Apps	(Points)
1980	NZ Secondary Schools		
1983	NZ Colts	3	(4)
1984	NZ Juniors	4	(0)
1986	NZ Emerging Players	5	(0)
1988–89	NZ Divisional XV	6	(8)

Paul John Renton (15 September 1962 – 2 August 2017) was a New Zealand rugby union player. A loose forward, Renton played the majority of his games as a flanker. Paul and his wife Marie won Hawke's Bay Farmer of the Year in 2017.

== Early life and family ==
Born on 15 September 1962, Renton was the son of John and Margaret Renton. He grew up on his family's farm, "Glenmore", at Mangatahi, west of Hastings. He was educated at Rathkeale College, where he played in the 1st XV rugby team, and represented New Zealand Secondary Schools in 1980. The same year he played one match at number 8 for a Wairarapa Bush Invitational XV. He went on to Massey University, gaining a Diploma of Agriculture in 1983.

== Representative rugby ==
While at Massey, Renton played one game as a flanker for Manawatu in 1983. He then represented Mid Canterbury for the following two seasons, scoring four tries in all, with all but one of his 21 appearances being at number 8. Renton completed his provincial career with Hawke's Bay, playing 44 matches and scoring 11 tries for the union between 1986 and 1989. Two of those games were at number 8, with the remainder at flanker.

Renton played for various national age-group and second-tier sides throughout his rugby career and was on the fringes of selection for the All Blacks. He played three matches for the New Zealand Colts (under-21) in 1983, and four for New Zealand Juniors (under-23) the next year. He had five games for a New Zealand Emerging Players team in 1986, and in 1987 and 1988 he played as a flanker in All Blacks trials, scoring a try in both. In 1988 and 1989, Renton was selected for the New Zealand Divisional XV, playing six matches and scoring two tries.

Over his career, Renton played 90 first-class matches and scored 20 tries.

== Later life ==
Renton married Marie Tait in 1990, and they went on to have three children, including Hurricanes player Hugh Renton. In 1996, the couple took over "Glenmore" from Renton's parents, and in 2017 they won the farmer of the year title at the Hawke's Bay Primary Sector Awards. Renton died at "Glenmore" on 2 August 2017. Renton had been struggling with a short spell of stress and depression, and took his own life on his farm.
