= Aidan Morgan =

New Zealand rugby union player

- Born: 7 June 2001 (age 25) Auckland, New Zealand
- Height: 172 cm (5 ft 8 in)
- Weight: 81 kg (179 lb; 12 st 11 lb)
- School: King's College

Rugby union career
- Position(s): Fly-half, Fullback, Centre
- Current team: Toyota Verblitz
Senior career
Years	Team	Apps	(Points)
2020–2024	Wellington	12	(41)
2022–2024	Hurricanes	23	(26)
2024–2025	Ulster	14	(10)
2025-	Toyota Verblitz	8	(5)
- Correct as of 1 August 2025
International career
Years	Team	Apps	(Points)
2021	New Zealand U20	4	(0)
- Correct as of 5 June 2022

Aidan Morgan (born 7 June 2001) is a New Zealand rugby union player who played for Ulster in the URC. His playing position is fly-half or fullback. He was named in the Hurricanes squad for the 2022 Super Rugby Pacific season. He was also a member of the Wellington 2021 Bunnings NPC squad.

In 2024 Morgan joined Ulster on a two-year contract. He is Irish-qualified through a Belfast-born grandfather. He featured extensively for Ulster in the early part of the season, but later lost the starting position to Jack Murphy, and at the end of the season he and Ulster ended his contract by mutual consent. He joined Toyota Verblitz ahead of the 2025-26 season.
