= Vereniki Tikoisolomone =

Fijian rugby union player (born 1998)

- Born: 24 November 1998 (age 27) Taveuni, Fiji
- Height: 188 cm (6 ft 2 in)
- Weight: 90 kg (198 lb; 14 st 2 lb)
- School: Lelean Memorial School

Rugby union career
- Position: Wing
- Current team: Taranaki, Houston SaberCats
Senior career
Years	Team	Apps	(Points)
2019–2020	Wanganui	13	(80)
2021–	Taranaki	15	(30)
2023–	Houston SaberCats	12	(25)
- Correct as of 27 June 2023
International career
Years	Team	Apps	(Points)
2021	New Zealand Barbarians	1	(5)
- Correct as of 22 October 2022

Vereniki Tikoisolomone (born 24 November 1998) is a Fijian rugby union player who plays for the Highlanders in Super Rugby. He also plays for the Houston SaberCats in Major League Rugby (MLR). His playing position is wing.

He was named as an injury replacement in the Highlanders squad for the 2022 Super Rugby Pacific season. He was also a member of the Taranaki 2021 Bunnings NPC squad.
