= Dominic Ropeti =

New Zealand rugby union player

- Born: 4 February 2003 (age 23) New Zealand
- Height: 193 cm (6 ft 4 in)
- Weight: 106 kg (234 lb; 16 st 10 lb)
- School: Scots College, Wellington

Rugby union career
- Position: Flanker
- Current team: Wellington Kobelco Steelers
Senior career
Years	Team	Apps	(Points)
2023–	Wellington	39	(55)
2026	Moana Pasifika	6	(0)
2026–	Kobelco Steelers	0	(0)
- Correct as of 9 November 2025

Dominic Ropeti (born 4 February 2003) is a New Zealand rugby union player, who plays for Wellington. His preferred position is flanker.

== Early career ==
Ropeti was born in New Zealand but is of Samoan ancestry. He attended Scots College, Wellington where he played rugby and earned selection for the New Zealand Barbarians schools team. He then earned selection for the Hurricanes U20 side in 2022 and previously in 2021. Ropeti plays his club rugby for Oriental Rongotai.

== Professional career ==
Ropeti has represented Wellington in the National Provincial Championship since 2023, being named in the squad for the 2025 Bunnings NPC. He signed for Moana Pasifika ahead of the 2026 Super Rugby Pacific season.
