= D'Angelo Leuila =

Samoa international rugby union player

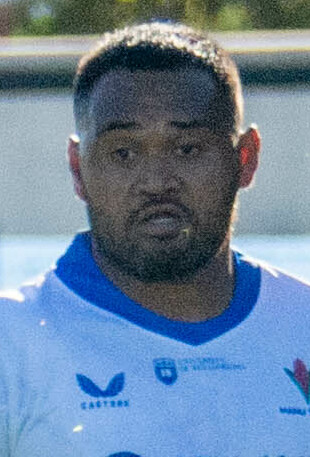
- Full name: Alai D'Angelo Leuila
- Born: 18 January 1997 (age 29) Auckland, New Zealand
- Height: 1.75 m (5 ft 9 in)
- Weight: 102 kg (225 lb; 16 st 1 lb)
- School: Papatoetoe High School

Rugby union career
- Position(s): Centre, Fly-half
- Current team: Waikato
Senior career
Years	Team	Apps	(Points)
2019	Auckland	5	(20)
2021–	Waikato	29	(126)
2022–2024	Moana Pasifika	10	(11)
- Correct as of 28 August 2023
International career
Years	Team	Apps	(Points)
2016	Samoa U20	4	(40)
2016–	Samoa	25	(85)
2018–2019	Samoa A	9	(89)
- Correct as of 28 August 2023

Alai D'Angelo Leuila (born 18 January 1997) is a professional rugby union player who plays as a centre for Super Rugby club Moana Pasifika. Born in New Zealand, he represents Samoa at international level after qualifying on ancestry grounds.

== Club career ==
He was named in the Waikato squad that would go on to win the 2021 Bunnings NPC.

== International career ==
Leuila is a Samoa international, having made his debut in 2016 against Georgia.
