= Solomone Funaki =

Tongan rugby union player (born 1994)

- Full name: 'Api Kakalaia Solomone Funaki (Note: also known as Api Funaki or Mone Funaki)
- Born: 25 April 1994 (age 32) Nukuʻalofa, Tonga
- Height: 1.87 m (6 ft 2 in)
- Weight: 110 kg (243 lb; 17 st 5 lb)
- School: Liahona High School

Rugby union career
- Position: Loose forward
Senior career
Years	Team	Apps	(Points)
2018–2022	Hawke's Bay	24	(30)
2022–2024	Moana Pasifika	24	(35)
2024–2025	Dragons	0	(0)
- Correct as of 27 December 2025
International career
Years	Team	Apps	(Points)
2014	Tonga U20	4	(0)
2021–	Tonga	15	(25)
- Correct as of 17 September 2023

'Api Kakalaia Solomone Funaki (born 25 April 1994) is a Tongan rugby union player, who most recently played as a loose forward for Moana Pasifika in Super Rugby and Hawke's Bay in New Zealand's domestic National Provincial Championship competition. From 2024–2025 he was contracted to Dragons RFC to play in the United Rugby Championship and European Rugby Challenge Cup, but left the club without playing a single competition game for them, due to a string of serious injuries. He represents Tonga internationally.

== Early life and career ==
Funaki was born in Fanga 'o Pilolevu in Nuku'alofa, Tonga.

In 2015, he moved to Auckland in New Zealand, where he played club rugby for Grammar TEC. That same year, he was named in the Auckland Colts squad.

Due to visa problems, he had to go back to Tonga, but in 2016 he returned to New Zealand to play club rugby in Whakatāne for Paroa Sports Rugby Club in the Eastern Bay of Plenty competition. In August 2016, he was named in the Bay of Plenty Development squad.

In 2017, Funaki was named in the Bay of Plenty Wasps side to play the New Zealand Universities team in an Anzac Day match. He also played a few preseason games for the Bay of Plenty Steamers, but wasn't named in the squad for the 2017 Mitre 10 Cup season. Later in the year, he was named in the Bay of Plenty Sevens team.

== Senior career ==
Funaki moved to Hawke's Bay in 2018, where he played club rugby for Maori Agricultural College (MAC) Sports Association. He was included in the Hawke's Bay squad for the 2018 Mitre 10 Cup season as a temporary injury replacement and made his debut for the Magpies on Sunday 30 September 2018 against Canterbury. It was his only Mitre 10 Cup game that year.

In 2019, he was named in the Magpies squad as a full squad member, but missed the entire 2019 Mitre 10 Cup season due to suffering two broken wrists.

He was again part of the Hawke's Bay squad for the 2020 Mitre 10 Cup season and earned his first start for the side on 15 November 2020 in an away game against Taranaki, in which he scored two tries and had a third controversially disallowed. During that season, he helped the Magpies win the Ranfurly Shield, successfully defend the Shield three times and win the Mitre 10 Cup Championship, thus securing a well-deserved promotion to the Premiership division.

Although not named in the initial Highlanders squad for the 2021 Super Rugby season, Funaki joined the squad in May 2021 on an injury replacement contract. He didn't get any game time for the Southern franchise.

After another successful 2021 Bunnings NPC season with Hawke's Bay that included 6 successful Ranfurly Shield defences, Moana Pasifika announced on 16 October 2021 that the new franchise had signed Funaki for the 2022 Super Rugby Pacific season. On 4 March 2022, Funaki wrote history by scoring Moana Pasifika's first ever try in their inaugural Super Rugby game against the Crusaders.

On 30 April 2024, Dragons RFC announced the signing of Funaki on a long-term deal from the 2024–25 United Rugby Championship season. However, on 23 December 2025, the club published a media release in which it announced the departure of Funaki, who wished to return to New Zealand to be with his family. He didn't play a single competition game for the club due to a string of serious injuries.

== International career ==
Funaki played for, and captained, the Tonga U20 team at the 2014 IRB Junior World Rugby Trophy in Hong Kong.

On 13 May 2018, he played for Tonga A in a World Series Rugby match against Western Force in Perth.

Funaki made his test debut for Tonga on 3 July 2021 against New Zealand at Mount Smart Stadium in Auckland. Unfortunately, he broke his hand in that match and was, therefore, not available for Tonga's remaining matches in July 2021. On 27 May 2022, he was again named in the Tongan national team for the 2022 Pacific Nations Cup and the Asia/Pacific qualification match for the 2023 Rugby World Cup.
