= Flyn Yates =

New Zealand rugby union player

- Born: 25 May 2000 (age 26) New Zealand
- Height: 188 cm (6 ft 2 in)
- Weight: 125 kg (276 lb; 19 st 10 lb)
- School: Palmerston North Boys' High School

Rugby union career
- Position: Prop
- Current team: Blues, Manawatu
Senior career
| Years | Team | Apps | (Points) |
| 2021– | Manawatu | 41 | (5) |
| 2023–2024 | Kamaishi Seawaves | 6 | (0) |
| 2026– | Blues | 1 | |
- Correct as of 9 November 2025

Flyn Yates (born 25 May 2000) is a New Zealand rugby union player, who plays for the Blues and Manawatu. His preferred position is prop.

== Early career ==
Yates attended Palmerston North Boys' High School where he played rugby for the first XV originally as a hooker before converting to prop. He plays his club rugby for Varsity in the Manawatu region, where he became captain of the side.

== Professional career ==
Yates has represented Manawatu in the National Provincial Championship since 2021, being named in the squad for the 2025 Bunnings NPC. In 2023, he joined Japanese side Kamaishi Seawaves for the 2023–24 Japan Rugby League One - Division Two season, making six appearances for the side. He was named in the Blues squad for the 2026 Super Rugby Pacific season.
