= Luke Donaldson =

New Zealand rugby union player (born 2000)

- Born: 20 May 2000 (age 26) Auckland, New Zealand
- Height: 183 cm (6 ft 0 in)
- Weight: 90 kg (198 lb; 14 st 2 lb)
- School: St. Paul's College

Rugby union career
- Position: Half-back
- Current team: Canterbury
Senior career
Years	Team	Apps	(Points)
2021–	Canterbury	1	(0)
- Correct as of 8 August 2021

Luke Donaldson (born 20 May 2000 in New Zealand) is a New Zealand rugby union player who plays for Canterbury. His playing position is scrum-half.
