= Dylan Nel =

South African rugby player (born 1992)

- Born: 27 November 1992 (age 33) Durban, South Africa
- Height: 185 cm (6 ft 1 in)
- Weight: 110 kg (243 lb; 17 st 5 lb)
- School: Clifton School

Rugby union career
- Position(s): Number 8, Flanker
- Current team: NEC Green Rockets
Senior career
Years	Team	Apps	(Points)
2015	West Coast	8	(0)
2016–2017	Canterbury	4	(5)
2018–2021	Otago	21	(20)
2020	Chiefs	4	(0)
2022–2023	Mitsubishi Dynaboars	12	(30)
2023–2024	Southland	12	(5)
2024–2025	Utah Warriors	27	(30)
2025–	NEC Green Rockets	12	(20)
- Correct as of 20 June 2020

Dylan Nel (born 27 November 1992 in South Africa) is a South African rugby union player who plays for the Chiefs in Super Rugby. His playing position is flanker. He has signed for the Chiefs squad in 2020.
