= Solomon Alaimalo =

NZ rugby union & league player (born 1995)

- Born: 27 December 1995 (age 30) Auckland, New Zealand
- Height: 196 cm (6 ft 5 in)
- Weight: 99 kg (218 lb; 15 st 8 lb)
- School: St. Bede's College

Rugby union career
- Position(s): Wing, Fullback
Senior career
Years	Team	Apps	(Points)
2016–2017	Northland	21	(30)
2017–2020	Chiefs	47	(95)
2018	Tasman	9	(20)
2019–2020	Waikato	5	(15)
2021–2022	Highlanders	2	(0)
2021–2022	Southland	13	(20)
2023	Canterbury	9	(15)
2025–2026	Moana Pasifika		
- Correct as of 11 November 2024
- Rugby league career

Playing information
- Position: Wing, Fullback
Club
Years	Team	Pld	T	G	FG	P
2024	Wests Tigers	8	2	0	0	8

Solomon Alaimalo (born 27 December 1995) is a New Zealand rugby union and rugby league player who played as a Wing for Moana Pasifika in Super Rugby.

== Senior career ==
=== Northland ===
Alaimalo debuted for Northland during the 2016 Mitre 10 Cup and immediately became a key figure for them, starting all 10 of their championship games, scoring 2 tries in the process.

== Super Rugby ==
Alaimalo was named in the Chiefs squad ahead of the 2017 Super Rugby season.

In November 2020, it was announced that Alaimalo would be moving to the Highlanders after being granted an early release from the Chiefs.

== NRL ==
=== Wests Tigers ===
On 11 December 2023, it was reported that he had signed for the Wests Tigers in the NRL. On 29 October 2024, Alaimalo departed the Wests Tigers and moved back to rugby union.
