= Luke Campbell (rugby union, born 1995) =

New Zealand rugby union player

- Born: 16 February 1995 (age 31) New Zealand
- Height: 177 cm (5 ft 10 in)
- Weight: 85 kg (187 lb; 13 st 5 lb)

Rugby union career
- Position: Scrum-half
- Current team: North Harbour
Senior career
Years	Team	Apps	(Points)
2016–2021	Bay of Plenty	41	(55)
2021	Hurricanes	12	(5)
2023–2025	New Orleans Gold	40	(44)
2022–2024	Manawatu	21	(10)
2025–	North Harbour	9	(10)
- Correct as of 4 October 2025

Luke Campbell (born 16 February 1995 in New Zealand) is a New Zealand rugby union player who plays for the Hurricanes in Super Rugby. His playing position is scrum-half. He also plays for the New Orleans Gold in Major League Rugby (MLR) in the U.S.

He was named in the Hurricanes squad for the 2021 Super Rugby Aotearoa season. He was also a member of the Bay of Plenty 2020 Mitre 10 Cup squad.
