= Rivez Reihana =

New Zealand rugby union player

- Born: 25 May 2000 (age 26) New Zealand
- Height: 189 cm (6 ft 2 in)
- Weight: 94 kg (207 lb; 14 st 11 lb)
- School: St. Kentigern College

Rugby union career
- Position(s): First five-eighth, Fullback
- Current team: Crusaders, Northland
Senior career
Years	Team	Apps	(Points)
2019–2020	Waikato	18	(31)
2021–2023	Chiefs	9	(5)
2021–	Northland	60	(443)
2024–	Crusaders	29	(156)
- Correct as of 26 October 2026
International career
Years	Team	Apps	(Points)
2019	New Zealand U20	7	(53)
2024–	Māori All Blacks	5	(18)
2025–	All Blacks XV	3	(15)
- Correct as of 26 October 2026

Rivez W. M. Reihana (born 25 May 2000) is a New Zealand rugby union player who plays for the Crusaders in Super Rugby and Northland in the Bunnings NPC. His position is first five-eighth.

== Rugby career ==
Reihana was named in the Chiefs squad for the 2021 Super Rugby Aotearoa season and played for the side until 2023.

== Personal life ==
Reihana is a New Zealander of Māori descent (Ngāi Tahu, Ngāti Hine, Ngāpuhi and Ngāti Tūwharetoa descent).
