= Josh Kaifa =

New Zealand rugby union player (born 1992)

- Full name: Siosiua A. Kaifa
- Born: 21 July 1992 (age 34) Auckland, New Zealand
- Height: 188 cm (6 ft 2 in)
- Weight: 103 kg (227 lb; 16 st 3 lb)
- School: Onehunga High School
- Notable relative: Tatafu Polota-Nau (cousin)

Rugby union career
- Position(s): Flanker, Number 8
Amateur team(s)
Years	Team	Apps	(Points)
2013–2014	Parramatta Two Blues	36	(5)
Senior career
Years	Team	Apps	(Points)
2016–2017	Auckland	7	(0)
2018–2024	Hawke's Bay	60	(65)
2022	Moana Pasifika	4	(0)
2024	Zebre Parma	4	(0)
- Correct as of 15 July 2025
International career
Years	Team	Apps	(Points)
2024	Tonga	2	(0)
- Correct as of 26 July 2024

Josh Kaifa (born 21 July 1992 in New Zealand) is a former professional rugby union player, who most recently played as a loose forward for Hawke's Bay in New Zealand's domestic National Provincial Championship competition. He previously played – as an injury replacement – for Moana Pasifika in Super Rugby and Zebre Parma in the United Rugby Championship.

Kaifa's retirement from rugby was announced in July 2025.

== Early career ==
Kaifa hails from Auckland, where he attended Onehunga High School. He played for the school's 1st XV team alongside future Auckland and Hawke's Bay teammate Stacey Ili.

After leaving school, he moved to Australia where he played for Melbourne club Footscray in the Dewar Shield competition. During that time, in 2012, he played for – and captained – the Victoria Under 20 team in an interstate tournament, including a 42–5 win over Queensland Country in the final.

The following year, he moved to Sydney where he played two seasons for the Parramatta Two Blues in the Shute Shield competition. He made his debut for Parramatta on 6 April 2013 against Sydney University and played a total of 36 games for the club.

He returned to New Zealand in 2015, where he played for – and captained – Manukau Rovers in the Auckland club rugby competition. On 27 July 2015, Kaifa was named in the Auckland B squad. At the end of the season, he was named the Auckland B player of the year. A year later, he was named the Auckland Club player of the year.

Kaifa is the cousin of former Australia hooker Tatafu Polota-Nau.

== Senior career ==
Kaifa was named in the Auckland squad for the 2016 Mitre 10 Cup season. He made his debut for the province, via the bench, against Northland on 26 August 2016. He earned his first start for Auckland against Bay of Plenty on 25 September, that year.

In 2017, Kaifa missed out on a spot in the Auckland's Mitre 10 Cup squad, but still made two appearances for the province as an injury replacement.

In 2018, he moved to Hawke's Bay, where he played for Clive Rugby & Sports Club in the province's club rugby competition. On 8 August 2018, he was named in the Hawke's Bay squad for the 2018 Mitre 10 Cup season. He made his first appearance and start for the province on 19 August 2018 against Southland and scored a try on debut. Since that game, he's been a regular in the Hawke's Bay match day 23.

Since his arrival in Hawke's Bay, Kaifa played several games for the Hurricanes Development team, but wasn't offered a Super Rugby contract. However, he received a call-up to train with the Crusaders during their preseason ahead of the 2022 Super Rugby Pacific season and played in the franchise's preseason game against the Highlanders on 4 February 2022.

Kaifa made his Super Rugby debut on 19 March 2022 for Moana Pasifika against the Chiefs, after coming into the squad in place of Jack Lam.

On 20 February 2024, Zebre Parma announced that the club had signed Kaifa as an injury replacement until the end of the 2023–24 United Rugby Championship season. He made his debut for the club on 1 March 2024 in their round 11 game against Munster and went on to play 4 games for the club.

== International career ==
On 21 June 2024, Kaifa – who is of Tongan descent and eligible to represent Tonga internationally – was named in the Tongan national team for a two-test series against Italy and Spain and the 2024 Pacific Nations Cup. He made his debut for Tonga on 12 July 2024 against Italy in Nukuʻalofa.
