= Daniel Hawkins (rugby union) =

New Zealand Rugby player

- Full name: Daniel Hawkins
- Born: 20 April 1991 (age 35) Picton, New Zealand
- Height: 180 cm (5 ft 11 in)
- Weight: 88 kg (194 lb; 13 st 12 lb)
- School: Queen Charlotte College

Rugby union career
- Position: First five-eighth
Senior career
Years	Team	Apps	(Points)
2010	Tasman	3	(2)
2013–2017, 2019–2024	Northland	87	(461)
2016	Melbourne Rebels	4	(2)
2017–2018	Mitsubishi DynaBoars	14	(133)
- Correct as of 4 October 2024

Daniel C. Hawkins (born 20 April 1991) is a New Zealand rugby union player. His position is First five-eighth. He has played Super Rugby for the Melbourne Rebels.
