= Steven Misa =

New Zealand rugby union player

- Born: 8 April 1995 (age 31) New Zealand
- Height: 176 cm (5 ft 9 in)
- Weight: 115 kg (254 lb; 18 st 2 lb)

Rugby union career
- Position: Hooker
Senior career
Years	Team	Apps	(Points)
2016	Waikato	9	(5)
2017	North Harbour	6	(0)
2019	Otago	4	(0)
2020–	Waikato	9	(5)
- Correct as of 15 February 2021
Super Rugby
Years	Team	Apps	(Points)
2020	Rebels	4	(0)
- Correct as of 15 February 2021

Steven Misa (born 8 April 1995, in New Zealand) is a New Zealand rugby union player who plays for the Rebels in Super Rugby. His playing position is hooker. He was announced in the Rebels squad for round 1 in 2020.

== Super Rugby statistics ==
As of 27 May 2020

Season	Team	Games	Starts	Sub	Mins	Tries	Cons	Pens	Drops	Points	Yel	Red
2020	Rebels	4	1	3	106	0	0	0	0	0	0	0
Total		4	1	3	106	0	0	0	0	0	0	0
