= Logan Crowley =

New Zealand Rugby player

- Born: 4 March 1996 (age 30) New Zealand
- Height: 174 cm (5 ft 9 in)
- Weight: 79 kg (174 lb; 12 st 6 lb)
- Notable relative: Kieran Crowley (uncle)

Rugby union career
- Position: Halfback
- Current team: Taranaki
Senior career
Years	Team	Apps	(Points)
2025–	Utah Warriors	16	(5)
Provincial / State sides
Years	Team	Apps	(Points)
2017–2018	Taranaki	12	(0)
2019–2020	Southland	9	(5)
2020–	Taranaki	34	(25)

Logan Crowley (born 4 March 1996) is a New Zealand rugby union player who currently plays for Taranaki in the Bunnings NPC. He previously played for Canterbury. He is the son of Alan Crowley who played 83 matches for Taranaki; he is also the nephew of All Black Kieran Crowley and Sean and Neil Crowley who also played for Taranaki. He plays for Coastal Rugby club in Taranaki. Crowley signed with the Utah Warriors in the Major League Rugby competition for the 2024 and 2025 seasons.
