= Mickey Woolliams =

New Zealand rugby union player

- Full name: Mickey Ray Woolliams
- Born: 27 March 1996 (age 30) Rotorua, NZ
- Height: 201 cm (6 ft 7 in)
- Weight: 116 kg (256 lb; 18 st 4 lb)
- School: Wellington College
- University: Massey University

Rugby union career
- Position(s): Lock, Flanker
- Current team: Taranaki
Senior career
Years	Team	Apps	(Points)
2019–2020	Counties Manukau	11	
2021–2022	Taranaki	7	

Mickey Woolliams (born 27 March 1996) is a New Zealand rugby union player who currently plays for Taranaki in the Bunnings Warehouse NPC. His preferred playing position is Lock.
