= TET Stadium & Events Centre =

- Interactive map of TET Stadium & Events Centre
- Location: Inglewood, New Zealand
- Coordinates: 39°09′17.6″S 174°12′42″E
- Capacity: 3,000

Construction
- Groundbreaking: 1997
- Built: 2000
- Opened: 2000

Tenants
- Taranaki; Inglewood United F.C. Inglewood & Taranaki Athletics

TET Stadium & Events Centre is a multi-purpose sports facility in Inglewood, New Zealand. It is one of the home grounds of the Taranaki Mitre 10 Cup side Taranaki. The ground also plays host to local side Inglewood United F.C. and to the Inglewood & Taranaki athletics clubs.

The facility was home to the Taranaki Mitre 10 Cup side between 2020 and 2021 when it moved from Yarrow Stadium in New Plymouth which was closed for renovations to comply with earthquake regulations.

The facility was used as a training venue for the 2015 FIFA U-20 World Cup, with the local Taranaki side having to move out of the venue for the duration of the tournament.

It features an all weather athletics track around the main field, a 1,000 seat covered grandstand and on the opposite side four large changing rooms, one smaller changing room. Upstairs in the pavilion, a balcony over looks the venue with bar, kitchen and conference facilities available.

Temporary infrastructure was built to be able to host Mitre 10 Cup matches in 2020 and 2021, including a camera tower, commentary and coaches boxes.

== History ==
The New Zealand Amateur Athletics Association set up the Taranaki Community Stadium Trust in 1985 to raise funds to build and all-weather athletic track in New Plymouth. The track and complex was considered by New Plymouth District Council in late 1997 and eventually the Jubilee Park location in Inglewood was selected. Olympic athlete Norman Read was a central figure in creating the vision for the centre. Many individuals, clubs and local businesses gave time and energy to the project which took 15 years from conception to completion. It was the first New Zealand venue to have an Olympic class Mondo track installed.
