= Pepesana Patafilo =

Samoan rugby union player

- Born: 29 May 1996 (age 30) Wellington, New Zealand
- Height: 181 cm (5 ft 11 in)
- Weight: 92 kg (203 lb; 14 st 7 lb)
- School: Wellington College

Rugby union career
- Position(s): Wing, Centre
- Current team: Kyuden Voltex
Senior career
Years	Team	Apps	(Points)
2018	Waikato	3	(5)
2019–2024	Wellington	54	(65)
2021	Hurricanes	2	(5)
2024-2025	Moana Pasifika	18	(15)
2025-	Kyuden Voltex	9	(15)
- Correct as of 21 March 2025
International career
Years	Team	Apps	(Points)
2015	Samoa U20	4	(0)
- Correct as of 5 June 2022

Pepesana Patafilo (born 29 May 1996 in New Zealand) is a New Zealand-born Samoan rugby union player who plays for Moana Pasifika in Super Rugby. His playing position is wing. He was named in the Hurricanes squad for the 2021 Super Rugby Aotearoa season. On the 1st of September 2023, he announced he was moving to Moana Pasifika for the 2024 and 2025 seasons. He was also a member of the Wellington 2020 Mitre 10 Cup squad.
