= Caleb Makene =

New Zealand rugby union player

- Full name: Caleb Lydon Makene
- Born: 20 April 1996 (age 30) Napier, New Zealand
- Height: 1.79 m (5 ft 10 in)
- Weight: 86 kg (13 st 8 lb; 190 lb)
- School: Napier Boys' High School
- University: Lincoln University

Rugby union career
- Position(s): Fullback, Wing, First five-eighth
- Current team: Utah Warriors
Senior career
Years	Team	Apps	(Points)
2016	Tasman	9	(10)
2017–2018	Canterbury	14	(25)
2019–2023	Hawke's Bay	46	(96)
2018	Crusaders	1	(0)
2021	Highlanders	1	(0)
2022–	Utah Warriors	44	(98)
- Correct as of 1 August 2024
International career
Years	Team	Apps	(Points)
2016	New Zealand U20	5	(30)
- Correct as of 12 November 2016

Caleb Makene (born 20 April 1996) is a New Zealand rugby union player who currently plays as an outside back or fly-half for Utah Warriors in the Major League Rugby (MLR). In New Zealand, he most recently played for Hawke's Bay in the National Provincial Championship competition

== Senior career ==
Born and raised in Napier, Makene attended and played rugby for Napier Boys' High School, captaining their first XV in 2014. After graduating high school, he headed south to attend Lincoln University in Christchurch and study environmental planning and management. While there, he was signed up by the Crusaders Academy and after 2 years in the Crusaders and Canterbury rugby structures, he was loaned to the Tasman Mako for the 2016 Mitre 10 Cup. Two tries in nine appearances for the Mako helped them reach the final of the 2016 Premiership, in which ironically they were defeated by Makene's parent province, Canterbury. After two seasons playing for Canterbury, Makene decided in February 2019 to return home to Hawke's Bay to play for the Magpies.

While not initially named in their squad for the 2021 Super Rugby season, Makene was called into the Highlanders squad as cover for Vilimoni Koroi, who was training with the New Zealand Sevens team in preparation of the 2021 Olympics. He made his Super Rugby debut for the Highlanders on 2 April 2021 against the Crusaders.

On 2 December 2021, Makene was named in the Utah Warriors squad for the 2022 Major League Rugby season.

== International ==
Makene was a member of the New Zealand Under 20 side which competed in the 2016 Oceania Rugby Under 20 Championship as well as the 2016 World Rugby Under 20 Championship in England, making 5 appearances and scoring 6 tries.
