= Dan Waenga =

New Zealand rugby union player (born 1985)

Daniel Waenga
- Born: Daniel Waenga; 6 November 1985 (age 41)
- Height: 1.78 m (5 ft 10 in)
- Weight: 85 kg (187 lb)

Rugby union career
- Position(s): Fly-half, Inside Centre
Senior career
Years	Team	Apps	(Points)
2011-12	Valladolid RAC	18	(256)
2013–	Biarritz Olympique	15	(11)
- Correct as of 22 February 2014
Provincial / State sides
Years	Team	Apps	(Points)
2006–08	Hawke's Bay	24	
2010–11	Bay of Plenty	19	(63)
2012	Hawke's Bay	6	(72)
- Correct as of 15 September 2013
Super Rugby
Years	Team	Apps	(Points)
2013	Chiefs	2	(0)
- Correct as of 15 September 2013
International career
Years	Team	Apps	(Points)
2005	New Zealand under-21	2	(10)
- Correct as of 15 September 2013

Daniel "Dan" Waenga (born 6 November 1985) is a New Zealand rugby union player. He plays in the fly-half (and occasionally inside centre) position for the Waikato based Super Rugby side the Chiefs, and for French club Biarritz Olympique.
