= Hugh Renton =

New Zealand rugby union player

- Born: 12 May 1996 (age 30) Hastings, New Zealand
- Height: 193 cm (6 ft 4 in)
- Weight: 114 kg (17 st 13 lb; 251 lb)
- School: Lindisfarne College
- Notable relative: Paul Renton (father)

Rugby union career
- Position(s): Flanker, Number 8
- Current team: Highlanders, Hawke's Bay
Senior career
| Years | Team | Apps | (Points) |
| 2016–2017, 2024– | Hawke's Bay | 20 | (5) |
| 2017 | Hurricanes | 1 | (0) |
| 2018 | Canterbury | 4 | (0) |
| 2020–2023 | Tasman | 30 | (0) |
| 2021– | Highlanders | 46 | (25) |
- Correct as of 16 June 2026

Hugh Renton (born 12 May 1996) is a New Zealand rugby union player, who currently plays as a loose forward for the Highlanders in Super Rugby and Hawke's Bay in New Zealand's domestic National Provincial Championship competition.

== Early career ==
Born and raised in Hastings, Renton attended Lindisfarne College, close to his hometown, where he was head boy in 2014. Renton played for the school's top side in 2012 and 2013, but was unable to play his senior year because of a nerve injury.

== Super Rugby ==
Renton played under-18 rugby for the Hurricanes in 2013 as a year-12 student and captained them against the Chiefs under-18, winning 40–10. The Wellington-based Super Rugby team, the Hurricanes, made an agreement that would keep Renton amongst the team, specifically to return him from injury and look after his development. He made no appearances during the 2015 campaign, but was a part of the Hurricanes squad for the 2016 season, in which the team was crowned Super Rugby champions for the first time. Despite coming back from injury and the campaign being a successful one for the franchise, it was one of personal disappointment for Renton, as injury ruined his year and he again failed to make the field.

The 2017 Super Rugby season saw Renton performing well throughout pre season. However he had to wait until round 13 against the Cheetahs to make his debut as regular Callum Gibbins pulled out late with injury. Renton came on as a replacement for Ardie Savea in the last quarter of the match, the Hurricanes went on to win 61–7. Gibbins returned to the squad the following week, which meant that was the only game time Renton saw in 2017 as the Hurricanes lost to the Lions in the semi-final 44–29. Despite having a promising Mitre 10 Cup for the Hawke's Bay Magpies and it being the first time he had played consistently without injury, Renton was not wanted in 2018 with the Hurricanes signing fellow Magpie Gareth Evans.

Despite not being named in the original Highlanders squad for the 2021 Super Rugby season Renton played for the side in their pre season matches and after impressive displays he was added to the full squad for the remainder of the season and was named on the bench to play the Crusaders in Round 1 of the 2021 Super Rugby Aotearoa season. He ended up playing 12 games for the side during the 2021 season and was one of their stand out performers as they made the Super Rugby Trans-Tasman final, which they lost 23–15 to the Blues.

2023 proved to be a breakout year for Renton. His physicality, skill set, and overall game developed significantly, earning him accolades as one of the top performers for the Highlanders. Renton finished the season as the team’s top try scorer, crossing the line five times, and solidified his role as a crucial player in the squad.

2024 Season and Setback. Renton began the 2024 season continuing his strong form from the previous year, displaying his signature strength in carrying, tackling, and versatility on the field. Unfortunately, in round 3 against the Waratahs, Renton ruptured his ankle, an injury that required surgery and ruled him out for the remainder of the Super Rugby season.

== National Provincial Championship ==
Renton played no rugby in 2015 due to an injury sustained in 2013. He played four times in 2016, twice as a starting player and twice coming on as a substitute, with continued injury hampering his 2016. In 2017, Renton played every game for the Magpies. He played 4 games for Canterbury in 2018. In September 2020 Renton was named in the Tasman Mako squad for the 2020 Mitre 10 Cup. Renton played 11 games for the Mako in the 2020 season as they won their second premiership title in a row. Renton was part of the side as they made the premiership again during the 2021 Bunnings NPC, this time losing to Waikato 23–20.

On 11 July 2024, the Hawke's Bay Rugby Union announced that Renton would return to his home province after signing a two-year contract ahead of the 2024 Bunnings NPC season.
