= 2018 Mitre 10 Cup =

2018 rugby union competition in New Zealand

2018 Mitre 10 Cup season
- Countries: New Zealand
- Date: 16 August – 27 October
- Champions: Auckland
- Runners-up: Canterbury
- Promoted: Waikato
- Relegated: Taranaki
- Matches played: 76
- Tries scored: 590 (average 7.8 per match)
- Top point scorer: Fletcher Smith (Waikato); 130 points
- Top try scorer: Sevu Reece (Waikato); 14 tries

Official website
- www.provincial.rugby

The 2018 Mitre 10 Cup season was the thirteenth season of New Zealand's provincial rugby union competition since it turned professional in 2006. The regular season began on August 16, when North Harbour hosted Northland. It involved the top fourteen rugby unions of New Zealand. For sponsorship reasons, the competition was known as the Mitre 10 Cup and it was the third season under the lead sponsor. The winner of the Championship, Waikato was promoted to the Premiership, the seventh placed Premiership team, Taranaki was relegated to the Championship.

== Format ==
The Mitre 10 Cup standings were sorted by a competition points system. Four points were awarded to the winning team, a draw equaled two points, whilst a loss amounted to zero points. Unions could also win their side a respectable bonus point. To receive a bonus point, they must have scored four tries or more or lose by seven or fewer points or less. Each team was placed on their total points received. If necessary of a tiebreaker, when two or more teams finish on equal points, the union who defeated the other in a head-to-head got placed higher. In case of a draw between them, the side with the biggest points deferential margin got rights to be ranked above. If they were tied on points difference, it was then decided by a highest scored try count or a coin toss. This seeding format was implemented since the beginning of the 2006 competition.

The competition included a promotion-relegation process with the winner of the Championship receiving automatic promotion to the Premiership, replacing the seventh-placed team in the Premiership which was relegated to the Championship for the following year. The regular season consisted of two types of matches. The internal division matches were when each team played the other six unions in their division once, home or away. The cross-division matches were when each team played four teams from the other division, thus missing out on three teams, each from the opposite division. Each union played home or away games against teams from the other division, making a total of ten competition games for each union. The finals format allowed the top four teams from each division move on to the semi-finals. The top two division winners, based on table points, received a home semi-final. In the first round of the finals, the semi-finals, the second division winner hosted the third division winner, and the first division winner hosted the fourth division winner. The final was hosted by the top remaining seed.

== Standings ==
Source: Mitre 10 Cup standings 2018

Premiership Division
#	Team	GP	W	D	L	PF	PA	PD	TB	LB	PTS
1	Auckland	10	9	0	1	343	209	+134	9	1	46
2	Tasman	10	9	0	1	319	195	+124	7	0	43
3	Canterbury	10	8	0	2	325	212	+113	8	1	41
4	Wellington	10	6	0	4	354	202	+152	7	3	34
5	North Harbour	10	6	0	4	317	297	+20	6	0	30
6	Counties Manukau	10	2	0	8	218	275	–57	3	6	17
7	Taranaki	10	2	0	8	203	335	–132	3	2	13

Championship Division
#	Team	GP	W	D	L	PF	PA	PD	TB	LB	PTS
1	Waikato	10	6	0	4	368	243	+125	7	3	34
2	RS – Otago	10	6	0	4	306	302	+4	4	1	29
3	Hawke's Bay	10	5	0	5	296	321	–25	7	1	28
4	Northland	10	4	0	6	276	306	–30	5	3	24
5	Bay of Plenty	10	4	0	6	253	292	–39	3	2	21
6	Manawatu	10	3	0	7	202	357	–155	2	0	14
7	Southland	10	0	0	10	168	402	–234	3	1	4

=== Standings progression ===
Premiership
Team	W1	W2	W3	W4	W5	W6	W7	W8	W9
Auckland	4 (3rd)	9 (2nd)	14 (2nd)	19 (1st)	24 (1st)	29 (1st)	31 (3rd)	36 (3rd)	46 (1st)
Canterbury	0 (6th)	5 (6th)	10 (4th)	15 (3rd)	22 (2nd)	27 (3rd)	32 (2nd)	37 (2nd)	41 (3rd)
Counties Manukau	1 (5th)	2 (7th)	8 (7th)	13 (5th)	13 (6th)	14 (6th)	15 (6th)	16 (6th)	17 (6th)
North Harbour	4 (4th)	9 (3rd)	9 (6th)	9 (7th)	14 (5th)	19 (5th)	24 (5th)	29 (5th)	30 (5th)
Taranaki	0 (7th)	5 (5th)	10 (5th)	10 (6th)	10 (7th)	12 (7th)	13 (7th)	13 (7th)	13 (7th)
Tasman	4 (2nd)	9 (1st)	14 (1st)	14 (4th)	19 (4th)	28 (2nd)	33 (1st)	38 (1st)	43 (2nd)
Wellington	5 (1st)	6 (4th)	11 (3rd)	17 (2nd)	22 (3rd)	27 (4th)	28 (4th)	29 (4th)	34 (4th)
Championship
Team	W1	W2	W3	W4	W5	W6	W7	W8	W9
Bay of Plenty	4 (3rd)	8 (2nd)	8 (2nd)	9 (4th)	9 (5th)	9 (5th)	10 (5th)	16 (5th)	21 (5th)
Hawke's Bay	5 (1st)	10 (1st)	12 (1st)	17 (1st)	17 (2nd)	18 (2nd)	23 (2nd)	28 (2nd)	28 (3rd)
Manawatu	5 (2nd)	5 (3rd)	5 (5th)	5 (6th)	5 (6th)	5 (6th)	9 (6th)	9 (6th)	14 (6th)
Northland	1 (4th)	1 (5th)	5 (4th)	6 (5th)	11 (4th)	16 (3rd)	21 (3rd)	22 (4th)	24 (4th)
Otago	0 (6th)	1 (6th)	6 (3rd)	10 (3rd)	15 (3rd)	15 (4th)	20 (4th)	25 (3rd)	29 (2nd)
Southland	0 (7th)	1 (7th)	1 (7th)	2 (7th)	2 (7th)	2 (7th)	2 (7th)	3 (7th)	4 (7th)
Waikato	1 (5th)	3 (4th)	3 (6th)	13 (2nd)	18 (1st)	23 (1st)	28 (1st)	33 (1st)	34 (1st)
The table above shows a team's progression throughout the season. For each week, their cumulative points total is shown with the overall division log position in brackets.
Key:	Win	Draw	Loss	Bye					

== Regular season ==
The 2018 Mitre 10 Cup played across nine weeks with every team playing one Wednesday night fixture in a double-up round where they played twice that week. The competition started on August 16, with North Harbour taking on Northland at QBE Stadium. The opening round saw a repeat of the Premiership final with Tasman against the then current champions Canterbury.

=== Week 1 ===
16 August 2018
19:35 NZST

North Harbour	21–20	Northland
Try: Dillon Hunt 32'; Tevita Li 50'; Con: Bryn Gatland (0/1); Bryn Hall (1/1) 51'; Pen: Bryn Gatland (3/4) 15', 25', 75'	Report	Try: Tom Robinson 7'; Jono Kitto 59'; Con: Jack Debreczeni (2/2) 8', 60'; Pen: Jack Debreczeni (2/3) 41', 67'; Cards: Tom Robinson (yellow card) 57'

North Harbour Stadium, Albany
Referee: Nick Briant

17 August 2018
19:35 NZST

Tasman	25–17	Canterbury
Try: Levi Aumua 18'; Quinten Strange 42'; Solomon Alaimalo 48'; Con: Mitchell Hunt (2/3) 19', 49'; Pen: Mitchell Hunt (2/2) 5', 65'; Cards: Blair Prinsep (yellow card) 70'	Report	Try: Greg Pleasants-Tate (2) 71', 77'; Con: Brett Cameron (2/2) 72', 78'; Pen: Brett Cameron (1/2) 40'

Lansdowne Park, Blenheim
Referee: Richard Kelly

18 August 2018
14:35 NZST

Manawatu	24–19	Waikato
Try: Junior Laloifi (2) 37', 75'; Faalelei Sione 49'; Rob Thompson 56'; Con: Jade Te Rure (1/2) 50'; Sam Malcolm (1/2) 57'; Pen: Sam Malcolm (0/1)	Report	Try: Sevu Reece 2'; Samisoni Taukei'aho 8'; Declan O'Donnell 60'; Con: Fletcher Smith (2/3) 3', 61'

Arena Manawatu, Palmerston North
Referee: Mike Fraser

18 August 2018
17:05 NZST

Auckland	23–19	Counties Manukau
Try: Salesi Rayasi 11'; Blake Gibson 27'; Melani Nanai 36'; Con: Harry Plummer (1/3) 28'; Pen: Harry Plummer (2/4) 31', 59'	Report	Try: Kalolo Tuiloma 3'; Sam Henwood 18'; Howard Sililoto 52'; Con: Latiume Fosita (2/3) 4', 19'

Eden Park, Auckland
Attendance: 10,700
Referee: Glen Jackson

18 August 2018
19:35 NZST

Bay of Plenty	30–10	Taranaki
Try: Liam Polwart 12'; Kane Le'aupepe 29'; Aaron Carroll 53'; Con: Mike Delany (3/3) 13', 30', 54'; Pen: Mike Delany (3/3) 64', 74', 78'	Report	Try: Seta Tamanivalu 15'; Con: Beaudein Waaka (1/1) 16'; Pen: Beaudein Waaka (1/2) 20'

Rotorua International Stadium, Rotorua
Referee: Brendon Pickerill

19 August 2018
14:05 NZST

Wellington	34–16	Otago
Try: Wes Goosen (2) 2', 6'; Malo Tuitama (2) 58', 76'; Con: Jackson Garden-Bachop (4/4) 3', 7', 59', 77'; Pen: Jackson Garden-Bachop (2/2) 10', 47'	Report	Try: Kurt Hammer 62'; Con: Sio Tomkinson (1/1) 63'; Pen: Finn Hart-Strawbridge (3/3) 23', 28', 45'

Wellington Regional Stadium, Wellington
Referee: Paul Williams

19 August 2018
16:35 NZST

Southland	10–31	Hawke's Bay
Try: Isaac Te Tamaki 24'; Con: James Wilson (1/1) 25'; Pen: James Wilson (1/1) 31'	Report	Try: Mark Braidwood 12'; Siosiua Kaifa 20'; Ash Dixon (2) 39', 47'; Con: Tiaan Falcon (4/4) 13', 21', 40', 48'; Pen: Tiaan Falcon (1/1) 68'; Cards: Michael Allardice (yellow card) 56'; Gareth Evans (yellow card) 60'

Rugby Park Stadium, Invercargill
Referee: Jamie Nutbrown

=== Week 2 ===
23 August 2018
19:35 NZST

Counties Manukau	17–22	Bay of Plenty
Try: Joe Royal 38'; Sione Molia 43'; Sam Henwood 68'; Con: Latiume Fosita (1/3) 44'	Report	Try: Chase Tiatia (2) 25', 61'; Richard Judd 54'; Con: Mike Delany (2/3) 26', 55'; Pen: Mike Delany (1/2) 40'

Navigation Homes Stadium, Pukekohe
Referee: Angus Mabey

24 August 2018
17:45 NZST

Otago	25–31	Hawke's Bay
Try: Josh Ioane 20'; Naulia Dawai 24'; Vilimoni Koroi 73'; Con: Josh Ioane (2/3) 21', 24'; Pen: Josh Ioane (2/2) 36', 57'; Cards: Josh Timu (yellow card) 48'	Report	Try: Siosiua Kaifa 15'; Jamie-Jerry Taulagi 28'; Ben May 50'; Mason Emerson 64'; Brad Weber 67'; Con: Tiaan Falcon (3/5) 15', 28', 68'

Forsyth Barr Stadium, Dunedin
Referee: Shuhei Kubo (Japan)

24 August 2018
19:45 NZST

RS – Taranaki	41–21	Manawatu
Try: Manasa Mataele 6'; Beaudein Waaka 19'; Teihorangi Walden 32'; Toa Halafihi 39'; Daniel Waite 48'; Con: Beaudein Waaka (5/5) 7', 20', 33', 40', 49'; Pen: Beaudein Waaka (2/2) 24', 45'	Report	Try: Junior Laloifi 14'; Nick Crosswell 27'; Rob Thompson 68'; Con: Sam Malcolm (2/2) 15', 28'; Jade Te Rure (1/1) 69'

Yarrow Stadium, New Plymouth
Referee: Mike Fraser

25 August 2018
14:05 NZST

Canterbury	27–20	Wellington
Try: Braydon Ennor 22'; Reed Prinsep 27'; Mitchell Drummond 40'; Caleb Makene 59'; Con: Brett Cameron (2/4) 28', 40'; Pen: Brett Cameron (1/2) 15'	Report	Try: Thomas Umaga-Jensen 17'; James O'Reilly 48'; Du'Plessis Kirifi 62'; Con: Jackson Garden-Bachop (1/3) 17'; Pen: Jackson Garden-Bachop (1/1) 43'

Rugby League Park, Christchurch
Referee: James Doleman

25 August 2018
16:35 NZST

Waikato	28–29	North Harbour
Try: Jordan Manihera 39'; Declan O'Donnell 50'; Quinn Tupaea 53'; Tyler Campbell 80'; Con: Fletcher Smith (4/4) 40', 51', 54', 80'; Pen: Fletcher Smith (0/1)	Report	Try: Tevita Li (2) 19', 63'; Penalty try 60'; Murphy Taramai 68'; Con: Bryn Gatland (2/3) 64', 69'; Pen: Bryn Gatland (1/1) 32'

Waikato Stadium, Hamilton
Referee: Cameron Stone

26 August 2018
14:05 NZST

Tasman	45–24	Southland
Try: Andrew Makalio 9'; Solomon Alaimalo 32'; Quinten Strange 37'; Will Jordan (2) 44', 79'; Ethan Blackadder 52'; Sione Havili 65'; Con: Tim O'Malley (4/5) 10', 38', 45', 53'; Mitchell Hunt (1/2) 66'	Report	Try: Tony Lamborn 12'; Flynn Thomas 29'; Manaaki Selby-Rickit 72'; Rory van Vugt 74'; Con: James Wilson (2/4) 13', 73'

Lansdowne Park, Blenheim
Referee: Jamie Nutbrown

26 August 2018
16:35 NZST

Northland	12–28	Auckland
Try: Blake Hohaia 21'; Rene Ranger 32'; Con: Jack Debreczeni (1/2) 22'; Pen: Jack Debreczeni (0/1)	Report	Try: Harry Plummer 15'; Melani Nanai (2) 43', 48'; Salesi Rayasi 53'; Con: Harry Plummer (4/4) 17', 44', 49', 54'

Okara Park, Whangārei
Referee: Richard Kelly

=== Week 3 ===
29 August 2018
19:35 NZST

Counties Manukau	19–26	Taranaki
Try: Kalolo Tuiloma 12'; Tevita Nabura 31'; Toni Pulu 77'; Con: Latiume Fosita (1/2) 13'; Luteru Laulala (1/1) 77'	Report	Try: Lachlan Boshier 4'; Beaudein Waaka (2) 59', 78'; Con: Beaudein Waaka (1/3) 79'; Pen: Beaudein Waaka (3/3) 36', 48', 55'

Navigation Homes Stadium, Pukekohe
Referee: Nick Briant

30 August 2018
19:35 NZST

Auckland	35–17	Waikato
Try: Jordan Trainor (2) 10', 61'; Robbie Abel (2) 39', 41'; Salesi Rayasi 67'; Con: Harry Plummer (1/4) 41'; Jacob Umaga (1/1) 67'; Pen: Harry Plummer (2/2) 20', 44'	Report	Try: Mosese Dawai 14'; Samisoni Taukei'aho 71'; Kylem O'Donnell 78'; Con: Fletcher Smith (1/3) 14'

Eden Park, Auckland
Attendance: 1,900
Referee: James Munro

31 August 2018
19:35 NZST

Wellington	52–7	Southland
Try: Thomas Umaga-Jensen 5'; Asafo Aumua 14'; Ben Lam (3) 23', 39', 57'; Tolu Fahamokioa 29'; James Blackwell 33'; Kaliopasi Uluilakepa 80'; Con: Jackson Garden-Bachop (5/6) 6', 25', 29', 34', 40'; TJ Va'a (1/2) 80'	Report	Try: Bill Fukofuka 69'; Con: James Wilson (1/1) 70'

Wellington Regional Stadium, Wellington
Referee: Shuhei Kubo (Japan)

1 September 2018
14:35 NZST

Bay of Plenty	19–31	Canterbury
Try: Chase Tiatia 19'; Tyler Ardron 26'; Terrence Hepetema 45'; Con: Mike Delany (2/3) 20', 46'; Pen: Mike Delany (0/1)	Report	Try: Josh McKay (2) 7', 60'; Daniel Lienert-Brown 29'; Penalty try 63'; Con: Brett Cameron (3/3) 8', 30', 61'; Pen: Brett Cameron (1/1) 69'

Tauranga Domain, Tauranga
Referee: Michael Winter

1 September 2018
17:05 NZST

Manawatu	17–50	Otago
Try: Rob Thompson 14'; Junior Laloifi 17'; Faalelei Sione 31'; Con: Jade Te Rure (1/2) 15'; Sam Malcolm (0/1)	Report	Try: Dylan Nel 10'; Naulia Dawai 37'; Michael Collins 46'; Matt Whaanga 63'; Donald Brighouse 65'; Jona Nareki 73'; Melani Matavao 80'; Con: Josh Ioane (6/7) 11', 38', 64', 66', 74', 80'; Pen: Josh Ioane (1/1) 70'

Arena Manawatu, Palmerston North
Referee: Paul Williams

1 September 2018
19:35 NZST

North Harbour	20–32	Tasman
Try: Gerard Cowley-Tuioti 20'; Matt Duffie 45'; Con: Bryn Gatland (2/2) 21', 46'; Pen: Bryn Gatland (2/2) 2', 40'; Cards: Chris Eves (yellow card) 54'	Report	Try: Tima Fainga'anuku 14'; Will Jordan 22'; Shannon Frizell 29'; Finlay Christie 69'; Con: Mitchell Hunt (3/4) 15', 23', 70'; Pen: Mitchell Hunt (2/2) 6', 55'

North Harbour Stadium, Albany
Referee: Glen Jackson

2 September 2018
14:05 NZST

Hawke's Bay	25–29	Counties Manukau
Try: Jonah Lowe (2) 23', 48'; Siosiua Kaifa 38'; Folau Fakatava 60'; Con: Tiaan Falcon (1/4) 61'; Pen: Tiaan Falcon (1/1) 74'	Report	Try: Tevita Nabura 20'; Daniel Hyatt 45'; Joe Royal 53'; Matiaha Martin 76'; Con: Latiume Fosita (3/4) 21', 54', 77'; Pen: Latiume Fosita (1/2) 72'

McLean Park, Napier
Referee: Mike Fraser

2 September 2018
16:35 NZST

Northland	18–17	Taranaki
Try: Tom Robinson 34'; Tamati Tua 56'; Con: Mathew Wright (1/2) 35'; Pen: Mathew Wright (2/3) 10', 80'	Report	Try: Latu Vaeno 7'; Manasa Mataele 40'; Con: Beaudein Waaka (2/2) 8', 40'; Pen: Beaudein Waaka (1/2) 21'

Okara Park, Whangārei
Referee: Michael Lash

=== Week 4 ===
5 September 2018
19:35 NZST

Waikato	43–31	Wellington
Try: Sevu Reece (3) 13', 20', 67'; Jordan Manihera 28'; Raniera Takarangi 47'; Samisoni Taukei'aho 61'; Con: Fletcher Smith (5/5) 14', 28', 48', 62', 68'; Dwayne Sweeney (0/1); Pen: Fletcher Smith (1/1) 54'; Dwayne Sweeney (0/1); Cards: Jordan Manihera (yellow card) 44'	Report	Try: Trent Renata 50'; Isaia Walker-Leawere 58'; Matt Proctor 72'; Malo Tuitama 76'; Losi Filipo 78'; Con: Pakai Turia (1/1) 51'; Jackson Garden-Bachop (2/4) 59', 77'; Pen: Pakai Turia (0/1); Cards: Malo Tuitama (yellow card) 33'; Tolu Fahamokioa (yellow card) 44'

Waikato Stadium, Hamilton
Referee: Brendon Pickerill

6 September 2018
19:35 NZST

Canterbury	34–23	Manawatu
Try: Reed Prinsep 7'; Greg Pleasants-Tate 26'; Caleb Makene 44'; Brett Cameron 56'; Luke Romano 67'; Con: Brett Cameron (3/5) 7', 56', 68'; Pen: Brett Cameron (1/1) 54'	Report	Try: Liam Mitchell 22'; Lifeimi Mafi 76'; Con: Sam Malcolm (2/2) 22', 76'; Pen: Sam Malcolm (3/3) 12', 18', 51'

Rugby League Park, Christchurch
Referee: Cameron Stone

7 September 2018
17:45 NZST

Otago	27–23	Northland
Try: Dylan Nel 27'; Jona Nareki 50'; Joketani Koroi 64'; Con: Josh Ioane (3/3) 28', 50', 64'; Pen: Josh Ioane (2/3) 56', 76'		Try: Tamati Tua 34'; Jack Debreczeni 43'; Con: Jack Debreczeni (2/2) 34', 43'; Pen: Jack Debreczeni (3/3) 20', 60', 69'

Forsyth Barr Stadium, Dunedin
Referee: Nick Webster

7 September 2018
19:35 NZST

Auckland	36–10	Tasman
Try: Patrick Tuipulotu (3) 28', 32', 40'; Melani Nanai 35'; Akira Ioane 76'; Con: Harry Plummer (4/5) 29', 33', 40', 77'; Pen: Harry Plummer (1/3) 19'	Report	Try: Ethan Blackadder 26'; Con: Mitchell Hunt (1/1) 27'; Pen: Mitchell Hunt (1/1) 22'

Eden Park, Auckland
Attendance: 5,350
Referee: Nick Hogan

8 September 2018
14:05 NZST

Southland	26–43	Counties Manukau
Try: Bill Fukofuka 9'; Morgan Mitchell 22'; Lewis Ormond 66'; Nico Costa 80'; Con: James Wilson (3/4) 10', 23', 67'	Report	Try: Fotu Lokotui 26'; Luteru Laulala 30'; Te Aihe Toma 32'; Nigel Ah Wong 47'; Joe Royal 50'; Cardiff Vaega 62'; Con: Latiume Fosita (4/5) 27', 31', 48', 51'; Luteru Laulala (1/1) 63'; Pen: Luteru Laulala (1/1) 72'

Rugby Park Stadium, Invercargill
Referee: James Doleman

8 September 2018
16:35 NZST

Hawke's Bay	29–28	Bay of Plenty
Try: Jonah Lowe 3'; Brad Weber (2) 48', 51'; Joe Apikotoa 78'; Con: Tiaan Falcon (3/4) 49', 52', 79'; Pen: Tiaan Falcon (1/1) 33'	Report	Try: Richard Judd (2) 35', 62'; Mike Delany 65'; Con: Mike Delany (2/3) 36', 65'; Pen: Mike Delany (3/4) 18', 31', 71'

McLean Park, Napier
Referee: Richard Kelly

9 September 2018
14:05 NZST

Wellington	35–23	North Harbour
Try: Asafo Aumua 18'; Kemara Hauiti-Parapara 40'; Malo Tuitama 42'; Wes Goosen 70'; Jackson Garden-Bachop 75'; Con: Jackson Garden-Bachop (2/5) 40', 76'; Pen: Jackson Garden-Bachop (2/3) 5', 30'	Report	Try: Tevita Li 23'; Matt Duffie 57'; Con: Bryn Gatland (2/2) 24', 58'; Pen: Bryn Gatland (3/3) 2', 7', 52'

Wellington Regional Stadium, Wellington
Referee: Michael Lash

9 September 2018
16:35 NZST

Taranaki	19–33	Waikato – RS
Try: Regan Ware 13'; Manasa Mataele 44'; Seta Tamanivalu 49'; Con: Beaudein Waaka (2/3) 14', 50'	Report	Try: Dwayne Sweeney 2'; Adam Burn 18'; James Tucker 24'; Samisoni Taukei'aho 34'; Quinn Tupaea 37'; Con: Fletcher Smith (4/5) 3', 24', 35', 38'

Yarrow Stadium, New Plymouth
Referee: Ben O'Keeffe

=== Week 5 ===
12 September 2018
19:35 NZST

North Harbour	21–31	Canterbury
Try: Matt Duffie 21'; Shaun Stevenson 36'; Sione Teu 72'; Con: Bryn Gatland (3/3) 22', 37', 73'; Cards: Tevita Li (yellow card) 55'	Report	Try: Nathan Vella 2'; George Bridge 8'; Reed Prinsep 48'; Mitchell Dunshea 59'; Con: Brett Cameron (4/4) 3', 9', 49', 60'; Pen: Brett Cameron (1/1) 40'; Cards: Connor Collins (yellow card) 65'

North Harbour Stadium, Albany
Referee: Angus Mabey

13 September 2018
19:35 NZST

RS – Waikato	42–22	Hawke's Bay
Try: Dwayne Sweeney 18'; Sevu Reece 28'; Jordan Manihera 33'; Murray Iti 60'; Fletcher Smith 67'; Raniera Takarangi 71'; Con: Fletcher Smith (6/6) 19', 29', 34', 61', 68', 72'	Report	Try: Brad Weber 7'; Tom Parsons 36'; Sasa Tofilau 79'; Con: Jamie-Jerry Taulagi (2/2) 8', 80'; Tiaan Falcon (0/1); Pen: Tiaan Falcon (1/1) 23'; Cards: Pasqualle Dunn (yellow card) 12'

Waikato Stadium, Hamilton
Referee: Nick Briant

14 September 2018
17:45 NZST

Northland	49–19	Manawatu
Try: Matt Matich 16'; Jordan Olsen 19'; Jordan Hyland 22'; Jack Debreczeni 36'; Scott Gregory 40'; Kara Pryor 48'; Blake Hohaia 73'; Con: Jack Debreczeni (4/6) 20', 23', 37', 49'; Myles Thoroughgood (0/1); Pen: Jack Debreczeni (2/2) 8', 59'	Report	Try: James Tofa 4'; Junior Laloifi 38'; Adrian Wyrill 80'; Con: Sam Malcolm (1/2) 39'; Otere Black (1/1) 80'; Cards: Sione Asi (yellow card) 69'

Okara Park, Whangārei
Referee: Michael Winter

14 September 2018
19:45 NZST

Tasman	53–17	Taranaki
Try: Tyrel Lomax 19'; Andrew Makalio (2) 34', 38'; David Havili 51'; Mitchell Hunt 62'; Will Jordan 71'; Solomon Alaimalo 74'; Con: Mitchell Hunt (5/5) 20', 35', 39', 52', 63'; Tim O'Malley (1/2) 75'; Pen: Mitchell Hunt (2/4) 5', 42'	Report	Try: Ciarahn Matoe 59'; Kane Thompson 67'; Con: Beaudein Waaka (2/2) 60', 68'; Pen: Beaudein Waaka (1/1) 23'

Trafalgar Park, Nelson
Referee: Jamie Nutbrown

15 September 2018
14:05 NZST

Counties Manukau	12–53	Wellington
Try: Daniel Hyatt 47'; Toni Pulu 59'; Con: Latiume Fosita (1/2) 48'		Try: Isaia Walker-Leawere 11'; Malo Tuitama 36'; Vaea Fifita (2) 39', 41'; Billy Proctor 40'; Asafo Aumua 49'; James O'Reilly (2) 69', 75'; Con: Jackson Garden-Bachop (5/7) 37', 40', 40', 50', 70'; Thomas Umaga-Jensen (0/1); Pen: Jackson Garden-Bachop (1/1) 18'

Navigation Homes Stadium, Pukekohe
Referee: Richard Kelly

15 September 2018
16:35 NZST

Southland	24–43	Otago
Try: Morgan Mitchell 53'; Manaaki Selby-Rickit 69'; Isaac Te Tamaki 80'; Con: James Wilson (3/3) 54', 70', 80'; Pen: James Wilson (1/1) 33'	Report	Try: Mitchell Scott (3) 15', 44', 59'; Jona Nareki (2) 17', 35'; Matt Faddes 21'; Jonah Aoina 75'; Con: Josh Ioane (4/7) 18', 22', 45', 76'

Rugby Park Stadium, Invercargill
Referee: James Munro

16 September 2018
14:05 NZST

North Harbour	32–20	Bay of Plenty
Try: James Parsons 20'; Bryn Hall 38'; Tevita Li 63'; Bryn Gatland 71'; Con: Bryn Gatland (3/4) 21', 64', 72'; Pen: Bryn Gatland (2/3) 17', 52'	Report	Try: Mike Delany 32'; James Lay 67'; Con: Mike Delany (1/1) 33'; Jason Robertson (1/1) 68'; Pen: Mike Delany (2/2) 2', 36'

North Harbour Stadium, Albany
Referee: Nick Webster

16 September 2018
16:35 NZST

Canterbury	29–34	Auckland
Try: Greg Pleasants-Tate 12'; Sef Fa'agase 39'; Chris King 79'; Brodie McAlister 80'; Con: Brett Cameron (3/4) 39', 79', 80'; Pen: Brett Cameron (1/2) 26'	Report	Try: TJ Faiane (3) 2', 9', 46'; Jonathan Ruru 31'; Tumua Manu 71'; Con: Harry Plummer (3/5) 10', 32', 72'; Pen: Harry Plummer (1/2) 16'

Rugby League Park, Christchurch
Referee: Ben O'Keeffe

=== Week 6 ===
19 September 2018
19:35 NZST

Manawatu	19–29	Tasman
Try: Sam Malcolm 12'; Michael Alaalatoa 40'; Michael Tagicakibau 64'; Con: Sam Malcolm (1/2) 40'; Otere Black (1/1) 65'; Cards: Antonio Kiri Kiri (yellow card) 55'	Report	Try: Jamie Spowart 7'; Levi Aumua 30'; Will Jordan 48'; Mitchell Hunt 57'; Con: Tim O'Malley (2/3) 8', 31'; Mitchell Hunt (1/1) 57'; Pen: Mitchell Hunt (1/1) 76'

Arena Manawatu, Palmerston North
Referee: Ben O'Keeffe

20 September 2018
19:35 NZST

Northland	26–10	Southland
Try: Matt Matich 17'; Sam Nock 23'; Murray Douglas (2) 26', 77'; Con: Jack Debreczeni (3/4) 18', 24', 78'	Report	Try: Manaaki Selby-Rickit 65'; Con: Broc Hooper (1/1) 66'; Pen: James Wilson (1/1) 11'

Okara Park, Whangārei
Referee: Brendon Pickerill

21 September 2018
19:35 NZST

Bay of Plenty	21–54	Waikato
Try: Hugh Blake 37'; Bailey Simonsson 61'; Kane Le'aupepe 80'; Con: Jason Robertson (1/1) 38'; Kaleb Trask (2/2) 62', 80'; Cards: Baden Wardlaw (yellow card) 49'	Report	Try: James Tucker 10'; Samisoni Taukei'aho (2) 23', 50'; Mitch Jacobson 30'; Quinn Tupaea (2) 41', 57'; Sekope Lopeti-Moli 67'; Matthew Lansdown 73'; Con: Fletcher Smith (7/8) 11', 24', 31', 42', 51', 58', 74'

Rotorua International Stadium, Rotorua
Referee: Angus Mabey

22 September 2018
14:35 NZST

Hawke's Bay	34–51	North Harbour
Try: Kianu Kereru-Symes 8'; Jonah Lowe 33'; Jamie-Jerry Taulagi 49'; Brad Weber 58'; Con: Jamie-Jerry Taulagi (4/4) 9', 34', 50', 59'; Pen: Jamie-Jerry Taulagi (2/2) 5', 42'	Report	Try: James Parsons (2) 29', 44'; Matt Duffie 40'; Shaun Stevenson 54'; Tevita Li 61'; Bryn Gatland 72'; Harrison Groundwater 79'; Con: Bryn Gatland (4/6) 30', 45', 55', 73'; James Parsons (1/1) 80'; Pen: Bryn Gatland (2/2) 12', 69'

McLean Park, Napier
Referee: Michael Winter

22 September 2018
17:05 NZST

Otago	25–47	Canterbury
Try: Michael Collins 17'; Josh Ioane 48'; Jona Nareki 78'; Con: Josh Ioane (2/3) 18', 49'; Pen: Sio Tomkinson (2/2) 7', 9'	Report	Try: George Bridge 2'; Phil Burleigh 13'; Mitchell Dunshea 29'; Josh McKay 36'; Caleb Makene 57'; Braydon Ennor 60'; Reed Prinsep 66'; Con: Brett Cameron (6/7) 3', 14', 30', 58', 61', 66'

Forsyth Barr Stadium, Dunedin
Referee: Nick Briant

22 September 2018
19:35 NZST

Taranaki	30–31	Auckland
Try: Seta Tamanivalu 23'; Tom Florence 50'; Mitchell Crosswell 73'; Ciarahn Matoe 80'; Con: Beaudein Waaka (2/3) 24', 51'; Stephen Perofeta (0/1); Pen: Beaudein Waaka (2/4) 11', 38'	Report	Try: Akira Ioane 1'; Tumua Manu 30'; Jonathan Ruru 39'; Salesi Rayasi (2) 59', 69'; Con: Harry Plummer (3/5) 31', 40', 70'; Pen: Harry Plummer (0/1); Cards: Melani Nanai (yellow card) 72'

Yarrow Stadium, New Plymouth
Referee: Glen Jackson

23 September 2018
14:05 NZST

Tasman	21–19	Counties Manukau
Try: Te Ahiwaru Cirikidaveta 8'; Wyatt Crockett 32'; Will Jordan 45'; Con: Mitchell Hunt (3/3) 9', 33', 46'	Report	Try: Sione Molia 55'; Joe Royal 63'; Tevita Nabura 78'; Con: Luteru Laulala (2/3) 56', 64'

Trafalgar Park, Nelson
Referee: Tim Griffiths

23 September 2018
16:35 NZST

Manawatu	7–49	Wellington
Try: Brice Henderson 69'; Con: Sam Malcolm (1/1) 70'	Report	Try: Thomas Waldrom 6'; Mateaki Kafatolu 10'; Thomas Umaga-Jensen 28'; Ben Lam (2) 32', 80'; James Blackwell 37'; Asafo Aumua 47'; Isaia Walker-Leawere 60'; Peter Umaga-Jensen 79'; Con: Jackson Garden-Bachop (0/6); Trent Renata (2/3) 61', 80'

Arena Manawatu, Palmerston North
Referee: Cameron Stone

=== Week 7 ===
26 September 2018
19:35 NZST

Hawke's Bay	55–41	Northland
Try: Gareth Evans 6'; Stacey Ili (2) 12', 35'; Marino Mikaele-Tu'u 21'; Pasqualle Dunn (2) 48', 65'; Ben Power (2) 57', 63'; Jamie-Jerry Taulagi 74'; Con: Jamie-Jerry Taulagi (3/7) 7', 22', 49'; Brad Weber (2/2) 66', 75'	Report	Try: Jaycob Matiu 15'; Mathew Wright (2) 19', 29'; Jordan Hyland 25'; Rene Ranger 37'; Con: Jack Debreczeni (5/5) 16', 20', 26', 30', 38'; Pen: Jack Debreczeni (2/2) 9', 54'; Cards: Kara Pryor (yellow card) 62'

McLean Park, Napier
Referee: Nick Hogan

27 September 2018
19:35 NZST

Bay of Plenty	15–17	Manawatu
Try: Aaron Carroll 67'; Luke Campbell 79'; Con: Kaleb Trask (1/2) 80'; Pen: Jason Robertson (1/1) 25'; Kaleb Trask (0/1)	Report	Try: Jamie Booth 2'; Sam Malcolm 33'; Con: Otere Black (2/2) 3', 34'; Pen: Otere Black (1/1) 55'; Cards: Faalelei Sione (yellow card) 75'

Rotorua International Stadium, Rotorua
Referee: Michael Lash

28 September 2018
19:35 NZST

Auckland	26–31	Otago
Try: Tumua Manu (2) 11', 27'; Dalton Papalii 15'; Akira Ioane 71'; Con: Harry Plummer (3/4) 12', 16', 72'	Report	Try: Vilimoni Koroi 2'; Jona Nareki 22'; Matt Faddes (3) 30', 48', 64'; Con: Josh Ioane (3/5) 3', 49', 65'; Cards: Michael Collins (yellow card) 5'

Eden Park, Auckland
Attendance: 4,300
Referee: Mike Fraser

29 September 2018
14:35 NZST

RS – Waikato	42–11	Southland
Try: Dwayne Sweeney 12'; Sevu Reece 40'; Murray Iti 43'; Samisoni Taukei'aho (2) 52', 75'; Toby Smith 69'; Con: Fletcher Smith (6/6) 13', 40', 44', 53', 70', 76'	Report	Try: Tauasosi Tuimavave 14'; Con: James Wilson (0/1); Pen: James Wilson (2/2) 10', 22'

Waikato Stadium, Hamilton
Referee: Jamie Nutbrown

29 September 2018
17:05 NZST

Taranaki	26–55	North Harbour
Try: Regan Ware 16'; Manasa Mataele 35'; Beaudein Waaka 63'; Jesse Parete 70'; Con: Beaudein Waaka (3/4) 17', 64', 71'	Report	Try: Daniel Hilton-Jones 2'; Tevita Li (4) 11', 23', 29', 50'; Matt Duffie 19'; Dillon Hunt (2) 38', 58'; Mark Tele'a 52'; Con: Bryn Gatland (5/9) 3', 30', 39', 51', 59'

Yarrow Stadium, New Plymouth
Referee: Tim Griffiths

29 September 2018
19:35 NZST

Wellington	22–28	Tasman
Try: Xavier Numia 24'; Galu Taufale 64'; Thomas Umaga-Jensen 75'; Con: Jackson Garden-Bachop (2/3) 25', 65'; Pen: Jackson Garden-Bachop (1/1) 5'	Report	Try: Finlay Christie 14'; Solomon Alaimalo 41'; Jacob Norris 54'; John Akau'ola-Laula 67'; Con: Mitchell Hunt (1/4) 15'; Pen: Mitchell Hunt (2/2) 7', 40'

Wellington Regional Stadium, Wellington
Referee: Nick Briant

30 September 2018
14:05 NZST

Canterbury	49–24	Hawke's Bay
Try: Alex Hodgman 10'; Braydon Ennor (2) 25', 58'; Mitchell Drummond 35'; George Bridge 48'; Tom Christie 61'; Connor Garden-Bachop 73'; Con: Brett Cameron (7/7) 11', 26', 36', 49', 59', 62', 74'	Report	Try: Sasa Tofilau 21'; Michael Buckley 45'; Folau Fakatava 64'; Con: Jamie-Jerry Taulagi (3/3) 22', 46', 65'; Pen: Jamie-Jerry Taulagi (1/1) 33'

Rugby League Park, Christchurch
Referee: James Doleman

30 September 2018
16:35 NZST

Counties Manukau	20–24	Northland
Try: Sione Molia 23'; Fotu Lokotui 45'; Toni Pulu 57'; Con: Luteru Laulala (1/3) 24'; Pen: Luteru Laulala (1/1) 3'	Report	Try: Jono Kitto 19'; Josh Goodhue 33'; Jordan Hyland 42'; Con: Jack Debreczeni (3/3) 20', 34', 43'; Pen: Jack Debreczeni (1/1) 69'

Navigation Homes Stadium, Pukekohe
Referee: Ben O'Keeffe

=== Week 8 ===
3 October 2018
19:35 NZST

Otago	45–34	Bay of Plenty
Try: Josh Ioane (2) 16', 48'; Vilimoni Koroi (2) 36', 70'; Matt Faddes (2) 44', 61'; Con: Josh Ioane (6/6) 17', 37', 45', 49', 61', 71'; Pen: Josh Ioane (1/1) 42'; Cards: Sione Misiloi (yellow card) 39'; Sio Tomkinson (yellow card) 51'	Report	Try: Bailey Simonsson 4'; Kaleb Trask 24'; Penalty try 39'; Tom Crozier 53'; Aaron Carroll 78'; Con: Kaleb Trask (1/3) 55'; Reece MacDonald (1/1) 79'; Pen: Kaleb Trask (1/1) 33'

Forsyth Barr Stadium, Dunedin
Referee: Jamie Nutbrown

4 October 2018
19:35 NZST

Wellington	24–29	Auckland
Try: Galu Taufale 7'; Thomas Umaga-Jensen 46'; Ben Lam 53'; Con: Jackson Garden-Bachop (3/3) 8', 47', 54'; Pen: Jackson Garden-Bachop (1/2) 17'; Cards: Mateaki Kafatolu (yellow card) 66'	Report	Try: Tumua Manu 24'; TJ Faiane 58'; Salesi Rayasi 68'; Jordan Trainor 70'; Con: Harry Plummer (3/4) 25', 59', 70'; Pen: Harry Plummer (1/1) 50'

Wellington Regional Stadium, Wellington
Referee: Nick Briant

5 October 2018
19:35 NZST

Hawke's Bay	45–17	Manawatu
Try: Pasqualle Dunn 23'; Kianu Kereru-Symes 29'; Tom Parsons 34'; Mark Braidwood 46'; Jamie-Jerry Taulagi 58'; Jonah Lowe 62'; Michael Buckley 73'; Con: Jamie-Jerry Taulagi (5/7) 30', 47', 59', 63', 74'	Report	Try: Brad Tucker 2'; Michael Alaalatoa 15'; Con: Otere Black (2/2) 3', 16'; Pen: Otere Black (1/2) 21'; Cards: Hamish Northcott (yellow card) 79'

McLean Park, Napier
Referee: Ben O'Keeffe

6 October 2018
14:35 NZST

Northland	28–71	Waikato
Try: Rene Ranger 12'; Renata Roberts-Te Nana 52'; Sam Nock 59'; Aorangi Stokes 75'; Con: Jack Debreczeni (4/4) 13', 53', 60', 76'	Report	Try: Bailyn Sullivan (2) 2', 17'; Sevu Reece (2) 20', 66'; Fletcher Smith 28'; Quinn Tupaea (2) 31', 42'; James Tucker 39'; Raniera Takarangi 50'; Penalty try 56'; Pepesana Patafilo 70'; Con: Fletcher Smith (7/9) 18', 29', 32', 40', 43', 51', 67'; Matthew Lansdown (0/1); Cards: Mitch Jacobson (yellow card) 75'

Okara Park, Whangārei
Referee: Brendon Pickerill

6 October 2018
17:05 NZST

North Harbour	36–26	Counties Manukau
Try: Harrison Groundwater 7'; Penalty try 35'; Daniel Hilton-Jones 42'; Shaun Stevenson 47'; Dillon Hunt 53'; Con: Bryn Gatland (3/4) 8', 48', 54'; Pen: Bryn Gatland (1/1) 13'	Report	Try: Cardiff Vaega 18'; Tevita Nabura 25'; Fotu Lokotui 49'; Penalty try 67'; Con: Latiume Fosita (2/3) 19', 50'; Cards: Sikeli Nabou (yellow card) 33'

North Harbour Stadium, Albany
Referee: James Munro

6 October 2018
19:35 NZST

Canterbury	41–7	Taranaki
Try: Mitchell Drummond 12'; Connor Garden-Bachop 17'; Billy Harmon 30'; Sam Beard 66'; Ngane Punivai 71'; Braydon Ennor 79'; Con: Brett Cameron (4/5) 13', 18', 31', 67'; James Hawkey (0/1); Pen: Brett Cameron (1/1) 37'; Cards: Hugh Renton (yellow card) 46'; Daniel Lienert-Brown (red card) 55'	Report	Try: Jayson Potroz 76'; Con: Beaudein Waaka (1/1) 77'; Cards: Jarrad Hoeata (red card) 5'

Rugby League Park, Christchurch
Referee: James Doleman

7 October 2018
14:05 NZST

Southland	22–26	Bay of Plenty
Try: Lewis Ormond 14'; Morgan Mitchell 34'; Isaac Te Tamaki 57'; Con: James Wilson (2/3) 35', 58'; Pen: James Wilson (1/1) 68'; Cards: Ben Fotheringham (yellow card) 78'	Report	Try: Bailey Simonsson 4'; Tom Crozier 11'; Fa'asiu Fuatai 21'; Kane Le'aupepe 73'; Con: Kaleb Trask (3/4) 12', 22', 74'

Rugby Park Stadium, Invercargill
Referee: Tipene Cottrell

7 October 2018
16:35 NZST

Otago	21–47	Tasman
Try: Matt Faddes 43'; Sio Tomkinson 60'; Slade McDowall 66'; Con: Sio Tomkinson (3/3) 44', 61', 67'; Cards: Sione Misiloi (yellow card) 22'	Report	Try: Mitchell Hunt 6'; Andrew Makalio 24'; Will Jordan (3) 28', 52', 71'; David Havili 34'; Tima Fainga'anuku 56'; Con: Mitchell Hunt (6/7) 7', 25', 29', 35', 53', 57'

Forsyth Barr Stadium, Dunedin
Referee: Paul Williams

=== Week 9 ===
10 October 2018
19:35 NZST

Southland	8–56	Auckland
Try: Joe Walsh 66'; Con: Tayler Adams (0/1); Pen: Tayler Adams (1/1) 7'; Cards: Nico Costa (yellow card) 15'	Report	Try: Salesi Rayasi 11'; Fa'atiga Lemalu 21'; Mike Sosene-Feagai (2) 45', 61'; Tumua Manu 52'; Caleb Clarke 71'; Desma Liaina 75'; Adrian Choat 78'; Con: Harry Plummer (5/5) 12', 22', 46', 53', 62'; Daniel Kirkpatrick (3/3) 72', 76', 79'

Rugby Park Stadium, Invercargill
Referee: James Doleman

11 October 2018
19:35 NZST

Tasman	29–0	Hawke's Bay
Try: Pari Pari Parkinson 40'; Tim O'Malley 43'; Mitchell Hunt 68'; Jack Grooby 76'; Con: Mitchell Hunt (3/4) 40', 68', 77'; Pen: Mitchell Hunt (1/1) 28'	Report

Trafalgar Park, Nelson
Referee: Mike Fraser

12 October 2018
19:35 NZST

Taranaki	10–34	Wellington
Try: Warwick Lahmert 13'; Con: Beaudein Waaka (1/1) 14'; Pen: Beaudein Waaka (1/1) 19'	Report	Try: Vaea Fifita 6'; Teariki Ben-Nicholas 38'; Matt Proctor 47'; Malo Tuitama 57'; Sitiveni Paongo 66'; Con: Jackson Garden-Bachop (2/3) 6', 57'; Trent Renata (1/2) 48'; Pen: Jackson Garden-Bachop (1/1) 80'

Yarrow Stadium, New Plymouth
Referee: Ben O'Keeffe

13 October 2018
14:35 NZST

Bay of Plenty	38–35	Northland
Try: James Lay 10'; Jeff Thwaites 14'; Liam Steel 20'; Emoni Narawa 29'; Fa'asiu Fuatai 50'; Chase Tiatia 71'; Con: Kaleb Trask (4/6) 11', 15', 21', 51'	Report	Try: Aorangi Stokes 32'; Ropate Rinakama 44'; Noah Cooper 57'; Tamati Tua 76'; Jordan Hyland 79'; Con: Jack Debreczeni (3/3) 33', 45', 58'; Wiseguy Faiane (2/2) 77', 80'

Tauranga Domain, Tauranga
Referee: Tipene Cottrell

13 October 2018
17:05 NZST

Waikato	19–23	Otago – RS
Try: Josh Iosefa-Scott 25'; Tyler Campbell 40'; Bailyn Sullivan 48'; Con: Fletcher Smith (2/3) 26', 49'	Report	Try: Mitchell Scott 11'; Joshua Dickson 15'; Joketani Koroi 19'; Con: Josh Ioane (1/3) 16'; Pen: Josh Ioane (2/2) 33', 62'

Waikato Stadium, Hamilton
Referee: Brendon Pickerill

13 October 2018
19:35 NZST

Counties Manukau	14–19	Canterbury
Try: Nigel Ah Wong 21'; Sione Molia 33'; Con: Luteru Laulala (2/2) 22', 34'	Report	Try: George Bridge 14'; Braydon Ennor 40'; Penalty try 46'; Con: Mitchell Drummond (1/2) 18'

Navigation Homes Stadium, Pukekohe
Referee: Angus Mabey

14 October 2018
14:05 NZST

Auckland	45–29	North Harbour
Try: Jonathan Ruru 18'; TJ Faiane (2) 23', 38'; Robbie Abel 44'; Jordan Trainor 50'; Salesi Rayasi (2) 58', 75'; Con: Harry Plummer (5/7) 19', 24', 45', 51', 59'; Pen: Harry Plummer (0/1); Cards: Dalton Papalii (yellow card) 71'	Report	Try: Luatangi Li 15'; Shaun Stevenson 40'; Harrison Groundwater 71'; Paletini Tu'ungafasi 79'; Con: Bryn Gatland (3/4) 40', 71', 80'; Pen: Bryn Gatland (1/3) 36'

Eden Park, Auckland
Attendance: 5,800
Referee: Cameron Stone

14 October 2018
16:35 NZST

Manawatu	38–26	Southland
Try: Jackson Hemopo 1'; Antonio Kiri Kiri (2) 17', 48'; Ngani Laumape (2) 34', 58'; Con: Otere Black (5/5) 2', 18', 35', 49', 59'; Pen: Jade Te Rure (1/1) 73'	Report	Try: Morgan Mitchell 21'; James Wilson 27'; Lewis Ormond (2) 45', 70'; Con: James Wilson (3/4) 22', 28', 46'

Arena Manawatu, Palmerston North
Referee: Paul Williams

== Play-offs ==
Semi-finals
1	Waikato	48
4	Northland	26
2	Otago	20
3	Hawke's Bay	19

Final
1	Waikato	36
2	Otago	13

Semi-finals
1	Auckland	38
4	Wellington	17
2	Tasman	16
3	Canterbury	21

Final
1	Auckland	40
3	Canterbury	33

=== Semi-finals ===
==== Championship ====
20 October 2018
14:35 NZST

Waikato	48–26	Northland
Try: Taukei'aho 15' c Stratton 37' c Reece (4) 40' c, 42' c, 53' c, 59' c Con: Smith (6/6) 16', 38', 40', 43', 54', 60'; Pen: Smith (2/2) 52', 72'; Cards: Tucker (yellow card) 65'; Jacobson (yellow card) 80'	Report	Try: Nock 2' c Gregory 23' c Wright 30' c Kitto 66' m Con: Debreczeni (3/3) 3', 24', 31'; Faiane (0/1); Pen: Debreczeni (0/1); Cards: Nock (yellow card) 35'

Waikato Stadium, Hamilton
Referee: Paul Williams

20 October 2018
19:35 NZST

Otago	20–19	Hawke's Bay
Try: Scott 50' c Tomkinson 73' c Con: Ioane (2/2) 51', 74'; Pen: Ioane (2/3) 27', 80'	Report	Try: Mikaele-Tu'u 5' c Weber 13' c Emerson 62' m Con: Taulagi (2/3) 6', 14'

Forsyth Barr Stadium, Dunedin
Attendance: 4,203
Referee: Ben O'Keeffe

==== Premiership ====
19 October 2018
19:35 NZST

Tasman	16–21	Canterbury
Try: Havili 35' c Con: Hunt (1/1) 36'; Pen: Hunt (3/3) 30', 40', 50'; Cards: Curry (yellow card) 53'; Jordan (yellow card) 70'	Report	Try: Drummond (2) 64' c, 76' m Con: Cameron (1/2) 65'; Pen: Cameron (3/3) 3', 40', 43'

Trafalgar Park, Nelson
Referee: Mike Fraser

20 October 2018
17:05 NZST

Auckland	38–17	Wellington
Try: Nanai 8' c Lemalu 15' c Ioane (2) 31' c, 58' c Fepulea'i 69' c Con: Plummer (5/5) 9', 16', 32', 59', 70'; Pen: Plummer (1/2) 37'	Report	Try: Goosen 5' c Ben-Nicholas 49' c Con: Garden-Bachop (2/2) 6', 50'; Pen: Garden-Bachop (1/2) 20'

Eden Park, Auckland
Attendance: 5,600
Referee: Brendon Pickerill

=== Finals ===
==== Championship ====
26 October 2018
19:35 NZST

Waikato	36–13	Otago
Try: Reece (2) 7' c, 54' c Tupaea 20' c Lansdown 31' m Campbell 45' c Con: Smith (4/5) 8', 21', 46', 55'; Pen: Smith (1/1) 69'	Report	Try: Lentjes 43' c Con: Ioane (1/1) 44'; Pen: Ioane (2/2) 14', 17'

Waikato Stadium, Hamilton
Referee: Ben O'Keeffe

==== Premiership ====
27 October 2018
16:05 NZST

Auckland	40–33 (a.e.t)	Canterbury
Try: Manu 34' c Ioane 48' m Trainor 62' c Clarke 72' c Sosene-Feagai 91' c Fukofuka 92' c Con: Plummer (5/6) 34', 62', 74', 91', 94'; Pen: Plummer (0/2)	Report	Try: Penalty try 26'; Bridge 32' c Sanders 84' c Con: Cameron (2/2) 33', 85'; Pen: Cameron (4/6) 10', 40', 51', 55'

Eden Park, Auckland
Attendance: 20,130
Referee: Glen Jackson

FB	15	Jordan Trainor
RW	14	Melani Nanai
OC	13	Tumua Manu
IC	12	TJ Faiane (c)
LW	11	Salesi Rayasi
FH	10	Harry Plummer
SH	9	Jonathan Ruru		(substituted off) 62'
N8	8	Akira Ioane	(yellow card) 26'
OF	7	Adrian Choat		(substituted off) 62'
BF	6	Evan Olmstead
RL	5	Michael Fatialofa		(substituted off) 52'
LL	4	Fa'atiga Lemalu
TP	3	Marcel Renata
HK	2	Robbie Abel		(substituted off) 55'
LP	1	Sam Prattley		(substituted off) 5'
Replacements:
HK	16	Mike Sosene-Feagai		(substituted on) 55'
PR	17	Jarred Adams		(substituted on) 5'
PR	18	Marco Fepulea'i
LK	19	Taleni Seu		(substituted on) 52'
FL	20	Hoskins Sotutu		(substituted on) 62'
SH	21	Leon Fukofuka		(substituted on) 62'
FH	22	Daniel Kirkpatrick
WG	23	Caleb Clarke

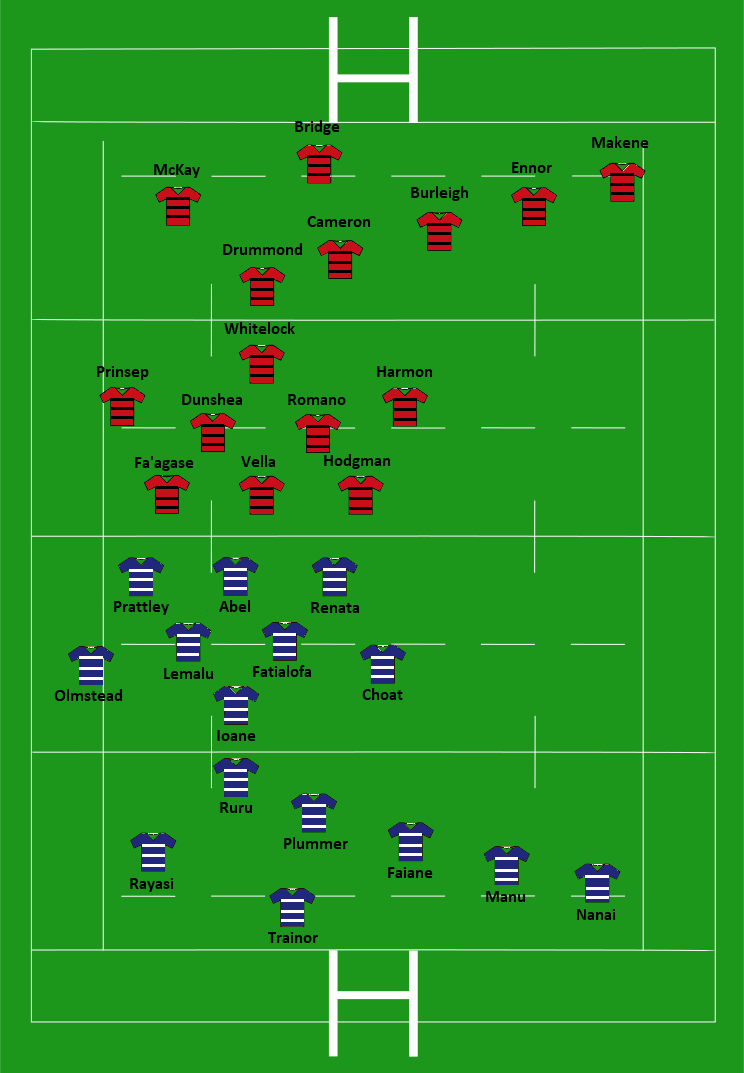

FB	15	George Bridge
RW	14	Josh McKay
OC	13	Braydon Ennor
IC	12	Phil Burleigh		(substituted off) 85'
LW	11	Caleb Makene		(substituted off) 26'
FH	10	Brett Cameron
SH	9	Mitchell Drummond (c)		(substituted off) 62'
N8	8	Luke Whitelock
OF	7	Billy Harmon	(yellow card) 41'
BF	6	Reed Prinsep
RL	5	Mitchell Dunshea
LL	4	Luke Romano
TP	3	Sef Fa'agase		(substituted off) 49'
HK	2	Nathan Vella		(substituted off) 49'
LP	1	Alex Hodgman		(substituted off) 53'
Replacements:
HK	16	Brodie McAlister		(substituted on) 49'
PR	17	Harry Allan		(substituted on) 53'
PR	18	Chris King		(substituted on) 49'
N8	19	Tom Sanders
FL	20	Tom Christie
SH	21	Ere Enari		(substituted on) 62'
CE	22	Sam Beard		(substituted on) 85'
WG	23	Ngane Punivai		(substituted on) 26'

== Statistics ==
=== Leading point scorers ===
No.	Player	Team	Points	Average	Details
1	Fletcher Smith	Waikato	130	10.83	2 T, 54 C, 4 P, 0 D
2	Brett Cameron	Canterbury	121	10.08	1 T, 37 C, 14 P, 0 D
3	Josh Ioane	Otago	116	9.67	4 T, 30 C, 12 P, 0 D
4	Mitchell Hunt	Tasman	116	10.55	4 T, 27 C, 14 P, 0 D
5	Harry Plummer	Auckland	113	9.42	1 T, 42 C, 8 P, 0 D
6	Bryn Gatland	North Harbour	109	10.90	2 T, 27 C, 15 P, 0 D
7	Jack Debreczeni	Northland	100	9.09	2 T, 30 C, 10 P, 0 D
8	Beaudein Waaka	Taranaki	93	9.30	4 T, 20 C, 11 P, 0 D
9	Jackson Garden-Bachop	Wellington	91	8.27	1 T, 28 C, 10 P, 0 D
10	Sevu Reece	Waikato	70	5.83	14 T, 0 C, 0 P, 0 D

Source: The weekly reviews of the matches published on provincial.rugby (see "Report" in the individual match scoring stats).

=== Leading try scorers ===
No.	Player	Team	Tries	Average
1	Sevu Reece	Waikato	14	1.17
2	Tevita Li	North Harbour	10	1.00
3	Salesi Rayasi	Auckland	9	0.75
4	Will Jordan	Tasman	9	0.82
5	Samisoni Taukei'aho	Waikato	9	0.82
6	Tumua Manu	Auckland	7	0.58
7	Quinn Tupaea	Waikato	7	0.58
8	Matt Faddes	Otago	7	0.58
9	Akira Ioane	Auckland	6	0.50
10	Braydon Ennor	Canterbury	6	0.50

Source: The weekly reviews of the matches published on provincial.rugby (see "Report" in the individual match scoring stats).

=== Points by week ===
Team	1		2		3		4		5		6		7		8		9		Total		Average	
Auckland	23	19	28	12	35	17	36	10	34	29	31	30	26	31	29	24	101	37	343	209	34.30	20.90
Bay of Plenty	30	10	22	17	19	31	28	29	20	32	21	54	15	17	60	67	38	35	253	292	25.30	29.20
Canterbury	17	25	27	20	31	19	34	23	60	55	47	25	49	24	41	7	19	14	325	212	32.50	21.20
Counties Manukau	19	23	17	22	48	51	43	26	12	53	19	21	20	24	26	36	14	19	218	275	21.80	27.50
Hawke's Bay	31	10	31	25	25	29	29	28	22	42	34	51	79	90	45	17	0	29	296	321	29.60	32.10
Manawatu	24	19	21	41	17	50	23	34	19	49	26	78	17	15	17	45	38	26	202	357	20.20	35.70
North Harbour	21	20	29	28	20	32	23	35	53	51	51	34	55	26	36	26	29	45	317	297	31.70	29.70
Northland	20	21	12	28	18	17	23	27	49	19	26	10	65	75	28	71	35	38	276	306	27.60	30.60
Otago	16	34	25	31	50	17	27	23	43	24	25	47	31	26	66	81	23	19	306	302	30.60	30.20
Southland	10	31	24	45	7	52	26	43	24	43	10	26	11	42	22	26	34	94	168	402	16.80	40.20
Taranaki	10	30	41	21	43	37	19	33	17	53	30	31	26	55	7	41	10	34	203	335	20.30	33.50
Tasman	25	17	45	24	32	20	10	36	53	17	50	38	28	22	47	21	29	0	319	195	31.10	19.50
Waikato	19	24	28	29	17	35	76	50	42	22	54	21	42	11	71	28	19	23	368	243	36.80	24.30
Wellington	34	16	20	27	52	7	66	66	53	12	49	7	22	28	24	29	34	10	354	202	35.40	20.20

Source: Mitre 10 Cup Fixtures and Results 2018

=== Tries by week ===
Team	1		2		3		4		5		6		7		8		9		Total		Average	
Auckland	3	3	4	2	5	3	5	1	5	4	5	4	4	5	4	3	15	5	50	30	5.00	3.00
Bay of Plenty	3	1	3	3	3	4	3	4	2	4	3	8	2	2	9	9	6	5	34	40	3.40	4.00
Canterbury	2	3	4	3	4	3	5	2	8	8	7	3	7	3	6	1	3	2	46	28	4.60	2.80
Counties Manukau	3	3	3	3	7	7	6	4	2	8	3	3	3	3	4	5	2	3	33	39	3.30	3.90
Hawke's Bay	4	1	5	3	4	4	4	3	3	6	4	7	12	12	7	2	0	4	43	42	4.30	4.20
Manawatu	4	3	3	5	3	7	2	5	3	7	4	13	2	2	2	7	5	4	28	53	2.80	5.30
North Harbour	2	2	4	4	2	4	2	5	7	6	7	4	9	4	5	4	4	7	42	40	4.20	4.00
Northland	2	2	2	4	2	2	2	3	7	3	4	1	8	12	4	11	5	6	36	44	3.60	4.40
Otago	1	4	3	5	7	3	3	2	7	3	3	7	5	4	9	12	3	3	41	43	4.10	4.30
Southland	1	4	4	7	1	8	4	6	3	7	1	4	1	6	3	4	5	13	23	59	2.30	5.90
Taranaki	1	3	5	3	5	5	3	5	2	7	4	5	4	9	1	6	1	5	26	48	2.60	4.80
Tasman	3	2	7	4	4	2	1	5	7	2	7	6	4	3	7	3	4	0	44	27	4.40	2.70
Waikato	3	4	4	4	3	5	11	8	6	3	8	3	6	1	11	4	3	3	55	35	5.50	3.50
Wellington	4	1	3	4	8	1	10	8	8	2	9	1	3	4	3	4	5	1	53	26	5.30	2.60

For	Against

Source: The weekly reviews of the matches published on provincial.rugby (see "Report" in the individual match scoring stats).

=== Sanctions ===
Player	Team	Red	Yellow	Sent off match(es)
Jarrad Hoeata	Taranaki	1	0	vs Canterbury
Daniel Lienert-Brown	Canterbury	1	0	vs Taranaki
Sione Misiloi	Otago	0	2	vs Bay of Plenty and Tasman
Mitch Jacobson	Waikato	0	2	vs Northland
Tom Robinson	Northland	0	1	vs North Harbour
Blair Prinsep	Tasman	0	1	vs Canterbury
Michael Allardice	Hawke's Bay	0	1	vs Southland
Gareth Evans	Hawke's Bay	0	1	vs Southland
Josh Timu	Otago	0	1	vs Hawke's Bay
Chris Eves	North Harbour	0	1	vs Tasman
Malo Tuitama	Wellington	0	1	vs Waikato
Tolu Fahamokioa	Wellington	0	1	vs Waikato
Jordan Manihera	Waikato	0	1	vs Wellington
Tevita Li	North Harbour	0	1	vs Canterbury
Connor Collins	Canterbury	0	1	vs North Harbour
Pasqualle Dunn	Hawke's Bay	0	1	vs Waikato
Sione Asi	Manawatu	0	1	vs Northland
Antonio Kiri Kiri	Manawatu	0	1	vs Tasman
Baden Wardlaw	Bay of Plenty	0	1	vs Waikato
Melani Nanai	Auckland	0	1	vs Taranaki
Kara Pryor	Northland	0	1	vs Hawke's Bay
Faalelei Sione	Manawatu	0	1	vs Bay of Plenty
Michael Collins	Otago	0	1	vs Auckland
Sio Tomkinson	Otago	0	1	vs Bay of Plenty
Mateaki Kafatolu	Wellington	0	1	vs Auckland
Hamish Northcott	Manawatu	0	1	vs Hawke's Bay
Sikeli Nabou	Counties Manukau	0	1	vs North Harbour
Hugh Renton	Canterbury	0	1	vs Taranaki
Ben Fotheringham	Southland	0	1	vs Bay of Plenty
Nico Costa	Southland	0	1	vs Auckland
Dalton Papalii	Auckland	0	1	vs North Harbour
Michael Curry	Tasman	0	1	vs Canterbury
Will Jordan	Tasman	0	1	vs Canterbury
Sam Nock	Northland	0	1	vs Waikato
James Tucker	Waikato	0	1	vs Northland
Akira Ioane	Auckland	0	1	vs Canterbury
Billy Harmon	Canterbury	0	1	vs Auckland

== Ranfurly Shield ==
=== Pre-season challenges ===
In March 2018, Taranaki accepted Ranfurly Shield challenges from both Heartland Championship unions, Wanganui and Poverty Bay after the regular season draw was confirmed. Tikorangi and Hawera were chosen to host the Ranfurly Shield matches. Taranaki Rugby announced the venues for the pre-season defenses in mid April for July 28 and August 4 at the Tikorangi Domain and TSB Hub.

28 July 2018
14:35 NZST

Taranaki	78–0	Poverty Bay
Try: Vaeno (3) 1' c, 9' c, 77' m Potroz (2) 3' c, 26' c Naholo (2) 7' m, 16' c Waite 20' m Maka 29' c Northcott-Hill (2) 35' c, 45' c Boshier 52' c Con: Waite (7/9) 2', 4', 10', 17', 27', 36', 46'; Northcott-Hill (1/1) 29'; Matoe (1/2) 54'	Preview; Report

Tikorangi Domain, Tikorangi
Attendance: 3,500
Referee: James Munro

4 August 2018
14:35 NZST

Taranaki	33–10	Wanganui
Try: Naholo 18' c Penalty try 23'; Lewis (2) 25' c, 28' c Northcott-Hill 69' m Con: Waaka (3/4) 19', 26', 29'	Preview; Report	Try: Gilbert 33' m Dibben 66' m Con: Scott (0/2)

TSB Hub, Hāwera
Attendance: 2,000
Referee: Michael Lash

== See also ==
- 2018 Heartland Championship
