= 2020 Super Rugby Aotearoa season =

Men's rugby union club competition

- Countries: New Zealand
- Tournament format(s): Round-robin tournament
- Champions: Crusaders(1st title)
- Matches played: 19
- Attendance: 345,561 (18,187 per match)
- Tries scored: 112 (5.89 per match)
- Top point scorer(s): Richie Mo'unga, Crusaders (99)
- Top try scorer(s): Will Jordan, Crusaders (6)
- Official website: Official site

The 2020 Super Rugby Aotearoa season (branded as Investec Super Rugby Aotearoa for sponsorship reasons) was a domestic club rugby union tournament organised by New Zealand Rugby. It was a 10-week, round robin tournament played by the five New Zealand-based teams of Super Rugby. The competition supplanted the 2020 Super Rugby season, which was suspended in March due to the COVID-19 pandemic.

Announced on 6 May, the competition ran from 13 June to 14 August, making it the first professional rugby union competition to occur since the beginning of the pandemic. On 8 June, with most non-travel restrictions relating to the pandemic having been lifted in New Zealand (Alert Level 1), it was announced that the matches would be played with spectators admitted, making it among the first professional sporting events not played behind closed doors since the beginning of the pandemic's global spread.

Due to the reinstatement of restrictions nationally on 11 August after new cases of community transmission, one match in the final round was played behind closed doors, and the other was cancelled due to Alert Level 3 in Auckland and declared a 0–0 draw — resulting in the Crusaders clinching the tournament championship.

With New Zealand border restrictions and managed isolation requirements not easing despite the country back in level 1 alert level as of October 11, 2020, Super Rugby Aotearoa and Australia returned in 2021, and Super Rugby Aotearoa were by sponsored by Sky New Zealand. There was expected to be an increase of Sunday afternoon fixtures, which proved popular in 2020.

== Law adaptions ==
On 2 June, New Zealand Rugby announced that it would implement two optional law trials being offered by World Rugby, including a golden point format for extra time, and that players who received a red card could be substituted after 20 minutes. It was also stated that referees would be stricter in applying laws for breakdowns to increase the pace of play.

== Standings ==
Pos	Team	Pld	W	D	L	PF	PA	PD	TF	TA	TB	LB	Pts
1	Crusaders	8	6	1	1	219	148	+71	27	13	3	1	30
2	Blues	8	5	1	2	176	149	+27	23	16	1	1	24
3	Hurricanes	8	5	0	3	202	213	−11	25	25	1	0	21
4	Highlanders	8	3	0	5	197	227	−30	23	34	0	2	14
5	Chiefs	8	0	0	8	155	212	−57	14	28	0	5	5

Rules for classification:
- 4 competition points to the winning team
- 0 competition point to the losing team
- 2 competition points to each team for a draw
- 1 competition point as the Try Bonus, to the team that scores at least three tries more than their opponents
- 1 competition point as the Loss Bonus, to the team that loses by fewer than 8 points

== Matches ==
=== Round 1 ===
13 June 2020
19:05

Highlanders	28–27	Chiefs (1 BP)
Try: A. Dixon 16' m Tomkinson 22' c Mikaele-Tu'u 39' c Con: M. Hunt (2/3) 23', 40+1'; Pen: M. Hunt (2/2) 3', 60'; Drop: Gatland (1/1) 79'	Report	Try: Wainui 27' c A. Lienert-Brown 72' m Con: McKenzie (1/2) 29'; Pen: McKenzie (4/4) 9', 14', 32', 47'; Drop: McKenzie (1/1) 78'

Forsyth Barr Stadium
Attendance: 18,218
Referee: Paul Williams

14 June 2020
15:35

Blues	30–20	Hurricanes
Try: Clarke 12' c Faiane 19' c Papalii 50' c Con: Black (3/3) 14', 20', 52'; Pen: Black (3/3) 55', 59', 66'	Report	Try: Coles 15' m Lam 26' m Booth 78' c Con: Perenara (1/1) 78'; Pen: Garden-Bachop (1/1) 9'

Eden Park
Attendance: 36,700
Referee: Mike Fraser

=== Round 2 ===
20 June 2020
19:05

Chiefs	12–24	Blues
Pen: McKenzie (4/5) 12', 21', 40'+1, 57'	Report	Try: Sotutu 15' c Tele'a 72' m Con: Black (1/1) 15'; Pen: Black (2/3) 37', 53'; Barrett (1/1) 69'; Drop: Barrett (1/1) 64'

FMG Stadium Waikato
Attendance: 23,874
Referee: Ben O'Keeffe

21 June 2020
15:35

Hurricanes	25–39	Crusaders (1 BP)
Try: Aumua 63' c Con: Garden-Bachop (1/1) 64'; Pen: Garden-Bachop (5/5) 7', 18', 28', 36', 45'; Drop: Garden-Bachop (1/1) 31'	Report	Try: Reece 1' c Ennor 14' m Goodhue 31' c Mo'unga 69' c D. Havili 75' c Con: Mo'unga (4/5) 3', 32', 70', 76'; Pen: Mo'unga (2/3) 50', 58'

Sky Stadium
Attendance: 17,606
Referee: Brendon Pickerill

=== Round 3 ===
27 June 2020
19:05

Blues	27–24	Highlanders (1 BP)
Try: Clarke 6' c Papalii (2) 23' c, 58' m R. Ioane 28' m Con: Black (2/4) 8', 24'; Pen: Black (1/1) 15'	Report	Try: A. Dixon 11' c M. Hunt 44' c Frizell 53' c Con: M. Hunt (3/3) 12', 46', 55'; Pen: M. Hunt (1/2) 21'

Eden Park
Attendance: 23,800
Referee: Paul Williams

28 June 2020
15:35

Crusaders	18–13	Chiefs (1 BP)
Try: Jordan (2) 33' c, 46' m Con: Mo'unga (1/2) 34'; Pen: Mo'unga (2/2) 10', 60'	Report	Try: Wainui 65' c Con: McKenzie (1/1) 66'; Pen: McKenzie (2) 24', 70'

Orangetheory Stadium
Attendance: 12,000
Referee: James Doleman

=== Round 4 ===
4 July 2020
19:05

Highlanders	20–40	Crusaders (1 BP)
Try: Frizell 19' c Punivai 25' c Con: M. Hunt (2/2) 20', 25'; Pen: M. Hunt (2/2) 40+1', 57'	Report	Try: Jordan (2) 15' m, 80' c Christie (2) 50' c, 77' c Reece 60' m Con: Mo'unga (3/5) 51', 78', 80+2'; Pen: Mo'unga (3/4) 10', 31', 35'

Forsyth Barr Stadium
Attendance: 19,875
Referee: Mike Fraser

5 July 2020
15:35

(1 BP) Chiefs	18–25	Hurricanes
Try: Penalty try 64'; Boshier 77' m Pen: McKenzie (2/2) 17', 42'	Report	Try: van Wyk (2) 4' c, 60' m Kirifi 38' c Con: Barrett (2/3) 5', 39'; Pen: Barrett (2/2) 35', 40'

FMG Stadium Waikato
Attendance: 15,031
Referee: Ben O'Keeffe

=== Round 5 ===
11 July 2020
19:05

Crusaders	26–15	Blues
Try: Drummond 61' c Jordan 75' c Con: Mo'unga (2/2) 62', 77'; Pen: Mo'unga (4/4) 28', 31', 48', 67'	Report	Try: Tele'a 10' c R. Ioane 55' m Con: Black (1/2) 12'; Pen: Black (1/1) 46'

Orangetheory Stadium
Attendance: 18,000
Referee: Paul Williams

12 July 2020
15:35

Hurricanes	17–11	Highlanders (1 BP)
Try: Perenara 28' c van Wyk 36' m Flanders 48' m Con: Barrett (1/3) 29'	Report	Try: A. Smith 58' m Pen: M. Hunt (2/3) 51', 80'

Sky Stadium
Attendance: 14,728
Referee: Brendon Pickerill

=== Round 6 ===
18 July 2020
19:05

Hurricanes	29–27	Blues (1 BP)
Try: Laumape 4' c Prinsep 34' m Coles 44' c Aumua 76' c Con: Barrett (3/4) 5', 45', 77'; Pen: Barrett (1/2) 40+3'	Report	Try: Barrett 10' c Papalii 29' m Ioane 57' c Eklund 63' m Con: Black (1/2) 11'; Barrett (1/2) 59'; Pen: Black (1/1) 2'

Sky Stadium
Attendance: 18,517
Referee: Ben O'Keeffe

19 July 2020
15:35

(1 BP) Chiefs	31–33	Highlanders
Try: Boshier 5' c A. Lienert-Brown 11' c Slater (2) 21' c, 42' c Con: McKenzie (4/4) 6', 12', 22', 43'; Pen: McKenzie (1/1) 15'	Report	Try: Mikaele-Tu'u 30' c M. Hunt 47' m A. Smith 56' c Nareki 75' c Tomkinson 80+2' c Con: M. Hunt (4/5) 31', 57', 76', 80+3'

FMG Stadium Waikato
Attendance: 10,713
Referee: Mike Fraser

=== Round 7 ===
25 July 2020
19:05

(1 BP) Crusaders	32–34	Hurricanes
Try: Mo'unga 17' c Bridge 31' c Strange 68' c Reece 76' m Con: Mo'unga (3/4) 18', 33', 69'; Pen: Mo'unga (2/2) 12', 47'	Report	Try: Goosen (2) 23' c, 35' m Umaga-Jensen 62' c Con: Barrett (2/3) 24', 63'; Pen: Barrett (5/5) 9', 30', 40+2', 59', 75'

Orangetheory Stadium
Attendance: 15,000
Referee: James Doleman

26 July 2020
15:35

Blues	21–17	Chiefs (1 BP)
Try: Duffie 6' c Tuipulotu 14' c Christie 55' c Con: Barrett (3/3) 8', 15', 55'	Report	Try: Boshier 20' c Alaimalo 46' c Con: McKenzie (2/2) 21', 48'; Pen: McKenzie (1/1) 51'

Eden Park
Attendance: 28,600
Referee: Brendon Pickerill

=== Round 8 ===
1 August 2020
19:05

Chiefs	19–32	Crusaders (1 BP)
Try: Boshier 22' c Con: McKenzie 23'; Pen: McKenzie (4/5) 26', 43', 50', 56'	Report	Try: Sanders 7' m Jordan 14' c Taylor 40+1' m Reece 61' c Fainga'anuku 67' m Con: Mo'unga (2/5) 15', 61'; Pen: Mo'unga (1/2) 52'

FMG Stadium Waikato
Attendance: 15,082
Referee: Ben O'Keeffe

2 August 2020
15:35

Highlanders	21–32	Blues (1 BP)
Try: Dixon 20' c Frizell 76' m Con: Ioane (1/2) 21'; Pen: Ioane (3/3) 15', 30', 36'	Report	Try: Ioane 7' m Christie (2) 10' c, 43' m Faiane 31' m Tu'ungafasi 40' c Con: Barrett (2/5) 12', 40+1'; Pen: Barrett (1/1) 56'

Forsyth Barr Stadium
Attendance: 20,000
Referee: Mike Fraser

=== Round 9 ===
8 August 2020
19:05

(1 BP) Hurricanes	31–18	Chiefs
Try: Umaga-Jensen (2) 7' c, 27' m Coles 50' m van Wyk 57' c Proctor 73' c Con: Barrett (3/5) 8', 58', 74'	Report	Try: Wainui 44' c Karpik 65' m Con: McKenzie (1/2) 45'; Pen: McKenzie (2/3) 25', 53'

Sky Stadium
Attendance: 20,317
Referee: James Doleman

9 August 2020
15:35

Crusaders	32–22	Highlanders
Try: Mo'unga 13' c Bridge (2) 61' c, 64' m Ennor 75' c Con: Mo'unga (3/4) 14', 63', 76'; Pen: Mo'unga (2/2) 29', 40+1'	Report	Try: Frizell 2' c Nareki 24' c Collins 54' m Con: Ioane (2/3) 3', 26'; Pen: Ioane (1/2) 22'

Orangetheory Stadium
Attendance: 17,500
Referee: Paul Williams

=== Round 10 ===
15 August 2020
19:05

Highlanders	38–21	Hurricanes
Try: Punivai 10' c A. Dixon 33' c Collins 46' c Penalty try 56'; M. Hunt 61' c Con: Ioane (3/3) 11', 34', 47'; M. Hunt (1/1) 62'; Pen: Ioane (1/1) 44'	Report	Try: Aso 5 c' Booth 29' c Umaga-Jensen 73' c Con: Barrett (3/3) 6', 29', 73'

Forsyth Barr Stadium
Attendance: No spectators admitted
Referee: Brendon Pickerill

16 August 2020
15:35

Blues	0–0	Crusaders

Eden Park

On 14 August, due to restrictions being reintroduced nationwide after new cases of community transmission (with Alert Level 3 in effect in Auckland and thus prohibiting all events, and all other regions under Alert Level 2), the penultimate match between the Highlanders and Hurricanes was played behind closed doors, and the final match between the Blues and Crusaders was cancelled and declared a draw (with both teams awarded two points on the final standings).

== Players ==
=== Squads ===
Blues squad
Forwards	Aaron Carroll • Gerard Cowley-Tuioti • Kurt Eklund • Blake Gibson • Josh Goodhue • Alex Hodgman • Akira Ioane • Tony Lamborn • Ezekiel Lindenmuth • Sione Mafileo • Dalton Papalii • James Parsons • Jacob Pierce • Marcel Renata • Waimana Riedlinger-Kapa • Tom Robinson • Hoskins Sotutu • Luteru Tolai • James Tucker • Karl Tu'inukuafe • Patrick Tuipulotu • Ofa Tu'ungafasi
Backs	Beauden Barrett • Otere Black • Dan Carter • Finlay Christie • Caleb Clarke • Matt Duffie • TJ Faiane • Jack Heighton • Jordan Hyland • Rieko Ioane • Joe Marchant • Emoni Narawa • Sam Nock • Jared Page • Stephen Perofeta • Harry Plummer • Jonathan Ruru • Mark Tele'a • Tamati Tua
Coach	Leon MacDonald

Chiefs squad
Forwards	Naitoa Ah Kuoi • Michael Allardice • Tyler Ardron • Lachlan Boshier • Mitchell Brown • Sam Cane • Rob Cobb • Ryan Coxon • Ross Geldenhuys • Nathan Harris • Luke Jacobson • Mitchell Karpik • Nepo Laulala • Donald Maka • Laghlan McWhannell • Atu Moli • Dylan Nel • Ollie Norris • Reuben O'Neill • Simon Parker • Aidan Ross • Bradley Slater • Pita Gus Sowakula • Angus Ta'avao • Samisoni Taukei'aho • Adam Thomson • Tupou Vaa'i
Backs	Solomon Alaimalo • Aaron Cruden • Tiaan Falcon • Orbyn Leger • Anton Lienert-Brown • Tumua Manu • Damian McKenzie • Sam McNicol • Lisati Milo-Harris • Kini Naholo • Etene Nanai-Seturo • Alex Nankivell • Shaun Stevenson • Bailyn Sullivan • Te Toiroa Tahuriorangi • Kaleb Trask • Quinn Tupaea • Sean Wainui • Brad Weber
Coach	Warren Gatland

Crusaders squad
Forwards	Michael Alaalatoa • Harry Allan • Scott Barrett • Ethan Blackadder • George Bower • Tom Christie • Whetu Douglas • Mitchell Dunshea • Cullen Grace • Billy Harmon • Sione Havili • Oliver Jager • Andrew Makalio • Brodie McAlister • Joe Moody • Luke Romano • Ethan Roots • Tom Sanders • Quinten Strange • Codie Taylor • Isi Tu'ungafasi • Sam Whitelock
Backs	George Bridge • Fergus Burke • Brett Cameron • Mitchell Drummond • Ere Enari • Braydon Ennor • Inga Finau • Leicester Fainga'anuku • Jack Goodhue • Bryn Hall • David Havili • Will Jordan • Manasa Mataele • Dallas McLeod • Richie Mo'unga • Fetuli Paea • Sevu Reece
Coach	Scott Robertson

Highlanders squad
Forwards	Teariki Ben-Nicholas • Liam Coltman • Ethan de Groot • Josh Dickson • Ash Dixon • Tom Florence • Shannon Frizell • Dillon Hunt • Josh Iosefa-Scott • Ricky Jackson • Ayden Johnstone • Zane Kapeli • Daniel Lienert-Brown • Marino Mikaele-Tu'u • Sione Misiloi • Jesse Parete • Pari Pari Parkinson • Manaaki Selby-Rickit • Jeff Thwaites • Siate Tokolahi • Jack Whetton
Backs	Michael Collins • Folau Fakatava • Connor Garden-Bachop • Bryn Gatland • Sam Gilbert • Scott Gregory • Kayne Hammington • Mitchell Hunt • Josh Ioane • Vilimoni Koroi • Kirisi Kuridrani • Josh McKay • Nehe Milner-Skudder • Tevita Nabura • Jona Nareki • Ngane Punivai • Aaron Smith • Rob Thompson • Sio Tomkinson • Thomas Umaga-Jensen• Teihorangi Walden
Coach	Aaron Mauger

Hurricanes squad
Forwards	Fraser Armstrong • Asafo Aumua • James Blackwell • Dane Coles • Gareth Evans • Alex Fidow • Vaea Fifita • Devan Flanders • Du'Plessis Kirifi • Kane Le'aupepe • Tyrel Lomax • Tevita Mafileo • Ben May • Liam Mitchell • Xavier Numia • Reed Prinsep • Pouri Rakete-Stones • Ricky Riccitelli • Ardie Savea • Scott Scrafton • Murphy Taramai • Isaia Walker-Leawere
Backs	Vince Aso • Jordie Barrett • Jamie Booth • Jackson Garden-Bachop • Wes Goosen • Simon Hickey • Ben Lam • Ngani Laumape • Jonah Lowe • TJ Perenara • Billy Proctor • Salesi Rayasi • Julian Savea • Fletcher Smith • Jonathan Taumateine • Chase Tiatia • Danny Toala • Peter Umaga-Jensen • Kobus van Wyk
Coach	Jason Holland

== See also ==
- Super Rugby
- Super Rugby Aotearoa
- Super Rugby AU
- Super Rugby Unlocked
- 2020 North vs South rugby union match
