= South Island (rugby union) =

- Full name: South Island
- Union: New Zealand Rugby
- Founded: 1897
- Coach(es): Brad Mooar and Greg Feek
- Captain: Sam Whitelock

The South Island is a New Zealand men's domestic rugby union team selected from the South Island's players, based on where they first played senior representative rugby. They played against the North Island in the North vs South match between 1897 and 2012.

A match was to be played on 29 August 2020 at Eden Park, but was delayed until a week later on 5 September and played at Sky Stadium, due to the COVID-19 pandemic.

2020 South Island squad
**Props**: (New Zealand) George Bower; (New Zealand) **Alex Hodgman**; (New Zealand) **Nepo Laulala**; (New Zealand) Daniel Lienert-Brown; (New Zealand) **Tyrel Lomax**; (New Zealand) **Joe Moody**; **Hookers**: (New Zealand) **Liam Coltman**; (New Zealand) Andrew Makalio; (New Zealand) **Codie Taylor**; **Locks**: (New Zealand) Mitchell Dunshea; (New Zealand) Manaaki Selby-Rickit; (New Zealand) **Sam Whitelock** (c)	**Loose forwards**: (New Zealand) Tom Christie; (New Zealand) **Shannon Frizell**; (New Zealand) **Dillon Hunt**; (New Zealand) Reed Prinsep; (New Zealand) Tom Sanders; **Halfbacks (scrum-halves)**: **(Scotland) Finlay Christie**; (New Zealand) **Mitchell Drummond**; (New Zealand) **Brad Weber**; **First five-eighths (fly-halves)**: (New Zealand) **Josh Ioane**; (New Zealand) **Richie Mo'unga**	**Midfielders (centres)**: (New Zealand) **Braydon Ennor**; (New Zealand) **Jack Goodhue**; (New Zealand) Leicester Fainga'anuku; (New Zealand) Sio Tomkinson; **Outside backs**: (New Zealand) **Jordie Barrett**; (New Zealand) **George Bridge**; (New Zealand) **Will Jordan**
(C) denotes the team Captain and **Bold** denotes a player who is internationally capped
