= Blair Prinsep =

- Born: 26 July 1995 (age 31) Christchurch, New Zealand
- Height: 183 cm (6 ft 0 in)
- Weight: 114 kg (17 st 13 lb; 251 lb)
- School: Christchurch Boys' High School
- Notable relative: Reed Prinsep (brother)

Rugby union career
- Position: Prop
Senior career
Years	Team	Apps	(Points)
2016–2020	Tasman	16	(5)
- Correct as of 21 November 2020

Blair E. Prinsep is a New Zealand rugby union player. His position is Prop. He is the brother of another Rugby union player Reed Prinsep.

== Tasman ==
Prinsep made his debut for Tasman in 2016, playing 6 games for the Mako that year. In 2017 Prinsep took a break from rugby to recover from injury. Prinsep made 7 appearances for the Mako in the 2018 season but missed the 2019 season with injury which the Mako side won for the first time unbeaten. He was not named in the 2020 Tasman Mako squad but did play 3 games in the 2020 season as the Mako won their second premiership title in a row.
