= Sevu Reece =

NZ international rugby union player

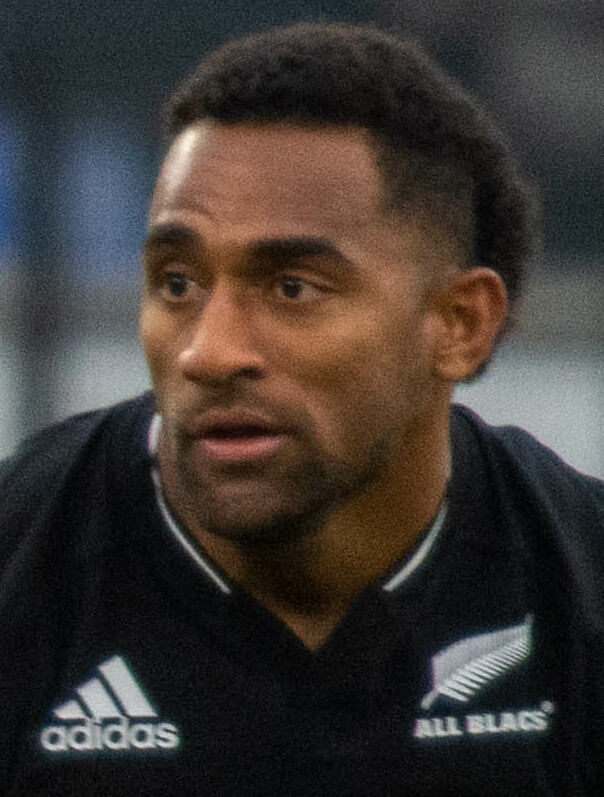
- Reece representing New Zealand during the 2021 November Internationals
- Full name: Sevuloni Lasei Reece
- Born: 13 February 1997 (age 29) Nadi, Fiji
- Height: 1.79 m (5 ft 10 in)
- Weight: 98 kg (216 lb; 15 st 6 lb)
- School: Hamilton Boys' High School

Rugby union career
- Position(s): Wing, Centre
- Current team: Crusaders, Southland
Senior career
Years	Team	Apps	(Points)
2016–2018	Waikato	33	(134)
2019–2026	Crusaders	102	(375)
2020–2022	Tasman	6	(25)
2024–2025	Southland	1	(0)
2027-	Perpignan	4	(5)
- Correct as of 14 June 2026
International career
Years	Team	Apps	(Points)
2017	New Zealand Barbarians	1	(0)
2019–2025	New Zealand	37	(110)
2025	All Blacks XV	1	(0)
- Correct as of 14 June 2026

Sevuloni Lasei Reece (born 13 February 1997) is a Fijian born New Zealand rugby union player who plays as a wing for the Crusaders in Super Rugby and Southland in the Bunnings NPC. Born in Fiji, he represents New Zealand at international level after qualifying on residency grounds. He is the highest try scorer in Super Rugby with 74 tries.

== Early life ==
Reece was born and raised in Nadi in Fiji, and attended Ratu Navula College where he excelled at rugby, and went on to attend Queen Victoria School, a boys' boarding school in Fiji. He represented the school in rugby and track and field in the Coke Games. He was a high jumper and a 100m sprinter. Reece moved to New Zealand in 2014 and attended Hamilton Boys' High School where he played first 15 rugby. After graduating high school, local Waikato club Melville signed him on a development contract. In 2016, he finished as the club's top points scorer as they lifted the Breweries Shield for the first time in 35 years.

== Club career ==
Excellent performances as a centre and outside back for Melville saw him called up to the Waikato squad for the 2016 Mitre 10 Cup. He debuted in a Ranfurly Shield defence against Thames Valley on 6 June 2016 and went on to make 12 Ranfurly Shield and Mitre 10 Cup appearances during the season, scoring 7 tries in the process.

Irish Pro14 club Connacht announced the signing of Reece in May 2018. He was set to join his new team after completing his Waikato commitments in the 2018 Mitre 10 Cup, however, in October 2018 it was announced that Connacht had decided to not go along with the deal in light of a domestic violence case against Reece, in which he pleaded guilty and was discharged without conviction.

In December 2018, Reece was part of the Crusaders squad for pre season and after strong performances as well as a career ending injury to Israel Dagg he was added to the squad for the Super Rugby season. In March 2019, he made his debut on the right wing against the Chiefs as a cover for Manasa Mataele who was injured the previous week and ruled out for the season. He scored an intercept try as well as winning the Man of the Match. He became a starter on the right wing for the remainder of the season scoring 15 tries and topping the try scoring charts for the 2019 Super Rugby season.

He was named in the North Island squad for the North vs South match in 2020, starting in the number 14 jersey in a 35-38 loss for the North.

Reece was named in the Tasman Mako squad for the 2020 Mitre 10 Cup making his debut for the Mako in Round 1 against Counties Manukau.

Reece was part of the Crusaders side that won the 2021 Super Rugby Aotearoa season, scoring a try in the final as the side won their fifth title in a row.

In Round 13 of the 2022 Super Rugby Pacific season, Reece played his 50th game for the Crusaders against the Brumbies, while in the same game also becoming the fastest player ever to reach 40 tries in Super Rugby.

== International career ==
In July 2019, Reece was named in the 39 member All Blacks team to prepare for the Rugby Championship and the 2019 Rugby World Cup.

== Personal life ==
In the early hours of July 1, 2018, a heavily intoxicated Reece got into an argument with his partner of two years in the Hamilton central business district. Reece yelled at his partner to "shut up, in much more colourful language than that", according to the court statement, and chased her down the street, dragging her to the ground. She suffered bruising to the side of her face and waist and bleeding to her knee.

He was subsequently granted a discharge without conviction in order for him to take up a contract in Ireland, by Judge Denise Clark in the Hamilton District Court. Judge Clark accepted that the victim had forgiven Reece, that the couple were undergoing counselling, Reece had admitted a problem with alcohol and had been sober for three months.

Reece expressed remorse and apologised at a restorative justice meeting. Judge Denise Clark imposed a NZ$750 fine when a letter from Connacht, confirming the contract offer would be withdrawn if he was convicted, was read in court.
