= Jono Kitto =

- Born: Jonathon Mark Kitto; 30 March 1992 (age 34) Christchurch, New Zealand
- Height: 1.75 m (5 ft 9 in)
- Weight: 85 kg (13 st 5 lb)

Rugby union career
- Position: Half-back
- Current team: Canterbury
Senior career
Years	Team	Apps	(Points)
2014–2015	Bay of Plenty	17	(0)
2015–2017	Leicester Tigers	29	(10)
2017	Worcester Warriors	2	(0)
2017–2018	Harlequins	9	(0)
2018	Northland	0	(0)
2019–2021	Worcester Warriors	9	(10)
2021–	Canterbury	0	(0)
- Correct as of 21 July 2021
International career
Years	Team	Apps	(Points)
2012	New Zealand U20	3	(0)
- Correct as of 3 March 2013

Jono Kitto (born 30 March 1992) is a New Zealand rugby union scrum half who is currently playing for Canterbury in New Zealand's National Provincial Championship; he has previously played for Leicester Tigers, Worcester Warriors and Harlequins in Premiership Rugby and Northland in New Zealand's domestic championship. He was born in Christchurch, New Zealand. He’s currently operating a run club called Run Strong. He also has strong interests in cryptocurrency and native New Zealand birds.

== Career ==
On 4 June 2015 it was announced that Kitto had signed for Tigers, with Kitto admitting that he signed for Leicester after playing as them in computer game Rugby 08. Kitto made his debut from the bench against Wasps at Welford Road on 1 November 2015 and featured 13 times in the 2015/16 season. On 29 February 2016 it was announced that Kitto had signed a new contract with Leicester.

After the departure of Aaron Mauger from Leicester's coaching team Kitto found his game time at Leicester more limited and on 19 September 2017 moved to Worcester Warriors on loan. Kitto played twice for Worcester before returning to Leicester on 4 October.

On 23 October 2017 it was announced that Kitto had been released by Leicester.

On 13 November 2017 Kitto was signed on a short-term deal by Harlequins. Injuries in the scrum-half position at Harlequins was the catalyst behind the deal.

On 11 February 2019 Worcester Warriors announced that Kitto was to re-join the cub that summer. His contracted ended in the summer of 2021 and was announced in Canterbury's squad for the 2021 National Provincial Championship.
