= Morgan Mitchell (rugby union) =

Canadian rugby union player

- Born: 20 July 1993 (age 33) Gore, New Zealand
- Height: 5 ft 7 in (1.70 m)
- Weight: 250 lb (110 kg)
- School: Gore High School

Rugby union career
- Position: Prop
Senior career
| Years | Team | Apps | (Points) |
| 2019 | Toronto Arrows | 16 | (15) |
| 2020–2022 | Kamaishi Seawaves | 23 | (15) |
| 2023– | Houston SaberCats | 14 | (0) |
Provincial / State sides
| Years | Team | Apps | (Points) |
| 2014–2022 2023 | Southland Wellington | 59 1 | (30) |

Morgan Mitchell (born 20 July 1993) is a New Zealand professional rugby union player. He plays as a tight head prop for the Toronto Arrows in Major League Rugby and Southland Stags in the Mitre 10 cup. Mitchell was born with a hearing impairment which progressed to being deaf in 2016. He now utilising a cochlear implant & is the first deaf player to play professionally in the Mitre 10.
