= Jack Grooby =

NZ rugby union player

- Born: Jack Baden Tua Grooby; 1 September 1998 (age 28) Murchison, New Zealand
- School: Nelson College

Rugby union career
- Position: Halfback
Senior career
Years	Team	Apps	(Points)
2018, 2021	Tasman	17	(5)
- Correct as of 6 November 2021

Jack Baden Tua Grooby (born 1 September 1998) is a New Zealand rugby union player. His position is halfback. Grooby was educated at Nelson College from 2014 to 2016.

== Tasman ==
Grooby made his debut for Tasman in 2018 when the Mako played Canterbury at Lansdowne Park in Blenheim where the Mako won 25–17. Grooby appeared 9 times for the Mako in the 2018 season. Grooby missed both the 2019 Mitre 10 Cup and the 2020 Mitre 10 Cup with injury in which the Mako won back to back premiership titles. Grooby made some handy contributions during the 2021 Bunnings NPC as Tasman made the premiership final before losing 23–20 to Waikato.
