= Jamie-Jerry Taulagi =

Samoa international rugby union player

JJ Taulagi
- Born: Jamie-Jerry Taulagi; 18 June 1993 (age 33) Auckland, New Zealand
- Height: 1.80 m (5 ft 11 in)
- Weight: 90 kg (14 st 2 lb; 198 lb)
- School: St Kentigern College, Auckland
- Notable relative: Murray Taulagi (brother)

Rugby union career
- Position(s): Fullback, Wing
Senior career
Years	Team	Apps	(Points)
2014–2015	Reds	10	(5)
2014–2015	Queensland Country	9	(30)
2016–2017	Munakata Sanix Blues	11	(29)
2017	Sunwolves	7	(11)
2018	Hawke's Bay	11	(67)
2018–2019	Stade Montois	12	(15)
2019–2021	SU Agen Lot-et-Garonne	24	(15)
2021–	Narbonne	3	(5)
- Correct as of 3 October 2021
International career
Years	Team	Apps	(Points)
2017–	Samoa	6	(18)
- Correct as of 3 October 2021

Jamie-Jerry Taulagi (born 18 June 1993) is a professional rugby union footballer of Samoan heritage. His usual position is fullback or wing. He has played for the Queensland Reds and Sunwolves teams in Super Rugby. He currently plays for Limoux Grizzlies in the French Super XIII competition.

== Early life ==
Taulagi was born in Auckland, New Zealand. As a junior rugby player he was selected in the Auckland East team which won the Roller Mills Shield in 2006. He attended De La Salle College from 2005 to 2010 where he was part of the 1st XV in 2009 that played in the Sanix World Rugby Youth Invitational Tournament. Taulagi then attended St Kentigern College and played for the 1st XV rugby team which won the Auckland 1A Championship in 2011. He moved to Brisbane, Australia in 2012.

== Rugby career ==
Taulagi joined the University of Queensland Rugby Club and played for the Premier Rugby team that won the Hospital Cup in 2012. He was invited into the ARU's National Academy and selected to play in an Under-19 match for Queensland against New South Wales in October 2012. In August 2013, he signed a foreign development player contract with the Queensland Reds, where he made 10 appearances in three seasons.

He moved to Japan in 2016 to ply for Munakata Sanix Blues in the Top League and later signed with the Sunwolves for the 2017 season.

Taulagi was selected in the Samoa national squad for their 2017 end-of-year tour. In England, he joined Devon club Newton Abbot RFC in a bid to win a contract with Exeter Chiefs for the 2017–18 season.

== Personal life ==
Taulagi's younger brother, Murray, is currently a member of the North Queensland Cowboys NRL squad.
