= George Bridge =

New Zealand rugby union player

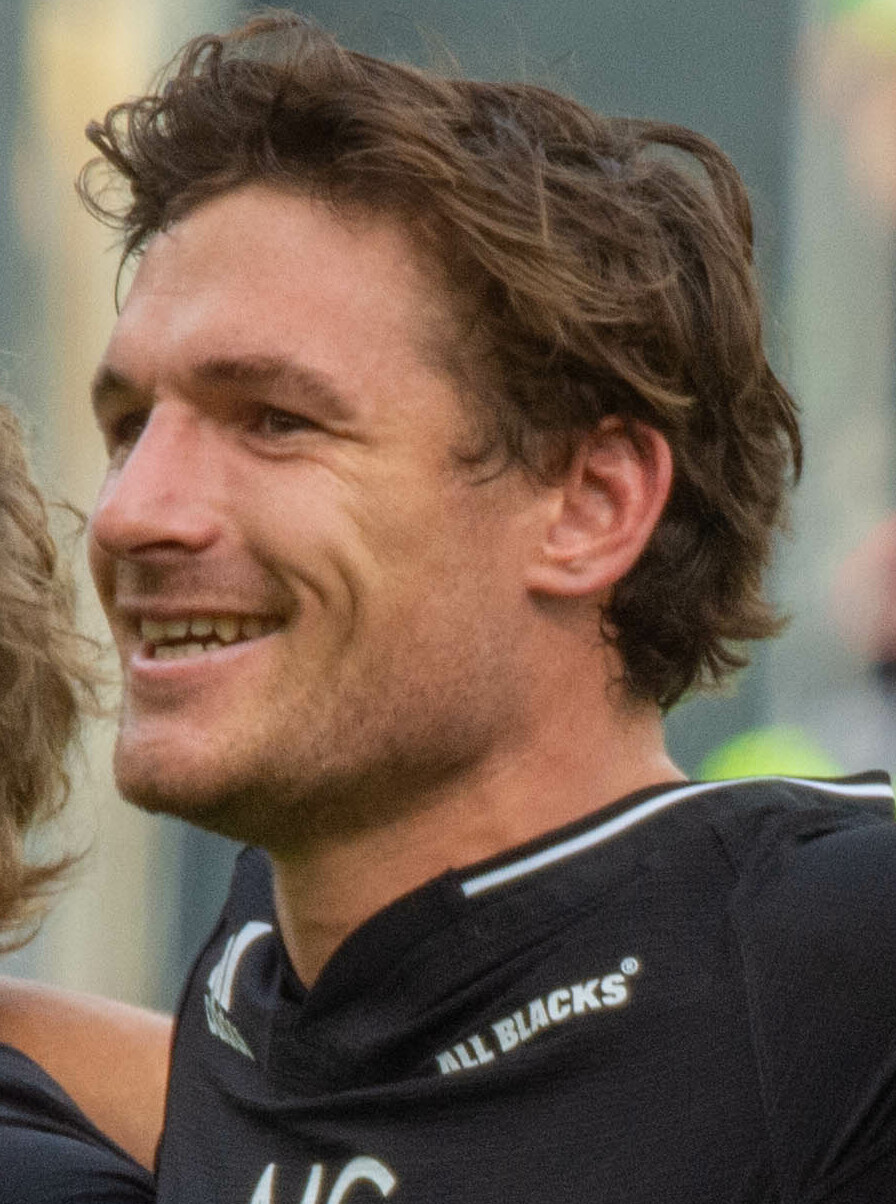
- Full name: George Crispin Bridge
- Born: 1 April 1995 (age 31) Gisborne, New Zealand
- Height: 186 cm (6 ft 1 in)
- Weight: 96 kg (212 lb; 15 st 2 lb)
- School: Lindisfarne College

Rugby union career
- Position(s): Wing, Fullback, Centre
- Current team: Kobelco Steelers
Senior career
Years	Team	Apps	(Points)
2016–2022	Canterbury	43	(110)
2017–2022	Crusaders	83	(185)
2022–2025	Montpellier	48	(55)
2026	Western Force	13	(10)
2026–	Kobelco Steelers		
- Correct as of 19 October 2024
International career
Years	Team	Apps	(Points)
2015	New Zealand U20	3	(5)
2017	Barbarians	2	(15)
2018–2021	New Zealand	19	(60)
- Correct as of 20 November 2021

George Crispin Bridge (born 1 April 1995) is a New Zealand rugby union player who currently plays for the Western Force in the Super Rugby. Bridge made his international debut for New Zealand in 2018, aged 23.

== Early life ==
Born and raised in Gisborne, Bridge took up rugby at the age of 5 and before long his skills brought him to the attention of New Zealand provincial rugby giants Canterbury. He played age-grade rugby with them all the way up to the age of 19 and was named as Canterbury's under-19 player of the year in 2014. He also spent time with the Crusaders academy and made a big impression in a Super Rugby warm-up match with the Reds in 2016 in which he scored two tries.

== Rugby career ==
=== Early career ===
Bridge's breakthrough came in 2016 when he was selected for the Canterbury squad for that year's Mitre 10 Cup. He scored five tries in eight matches as the Cantabrians finished the season as Premiership champions, their eighth title in nine years.

Bridge was a member of the New Zealand Under 20 side which competed in the 2015 World Rugby Under 20 Championship in Italy where he made two appearances and scored a try.

His debut season at provincial level saw him coached by Canterbury legend Scott Robertson and like his coach, Bridge found himself promoted to Super Rugby level in 2017, earning a contract with the Crusaders. Bridge made a successful start to the 2017 season, notching his first Super Rugby try against the Waratahs in Sydney. The Crusaders withstood a late charge, to win the contest 41–22. Bridge has subsequently elevated his game, scoring a hat trick of tries during the Crusaders 57–21 demolition of the Stormers in Christchurch on 21 April 2017. Bridge followed this effort with another 3 tries a week later, during another comprehensive Crusaders win over the Cheetahs in Bloemfontein on 29 April 2017.

With All Black midfielder Ryan Crotty out injured, Bridge was moved into the starting XV for the Crusaders, to play against the touring 2017 British & Irish Lions team, on 10 June 2017. Bridge played for 65 minutes of the historic fixture, before he was replaced by Tim Bateman. The Crusaders lost 3–12.

Bridge was voted as the Crusaders' Rookie of the Year by his team-mates at the end of the 2017 season, when they won the Super Rugby final against the Lions, beating the Lions by 25–17. Bridge came off the bench in the match, completing his 2017 season on a high note and then, was subsequently signed on to 2022 by the Crusaders.

On 4 November 2017 on his first International debut, Bridge started at 15 in the Barbarians F.C. vs the All Blacks under former Crusader and Wallaby coach Robbie Deans. Alongside his fellow Crusader teammate Richie Mo'unga at 10, Bridge scored two tries, making him one of the highest scoring Kiwis in single match against the All Blacks

=== 2018 ===
Bridge became a regular starter for the Crusaders during the 2018 Super Rugby season, with team-mate and established All Black winger Israel Dagg continuing to struggle with injury. Bridge was one of the top-try scorers of the 2018 season and scored his 15th try of the season during the semi-final against the Hurricanes. Bridge's form during the season saw Dagg displaced from the match-day 23 during the Super Rugby playoffs, with Bridge starting in the Super Rugby final. The Crusaders once again played against the Lions in the final, on 4 August 2018, beating them for the second consecutive year and winning 37–18.

Bridge started in the 2018 Mitre 10 Cup's final, against Auckland, on 27 October 2018. Bridge scored a try for Canterbury in the first half, but the team disappointingly lost to Auckland 40–33 after going into extra time. Bridge was, however, selected for the All Blacks after the final. All Blacks head coach, Steve Hansen, extended the squad size to 51 players for the 2018 end-of-year rugby union internationals, with intention to rest first-choice players during the tour.

On 3 November 2018, Bridge made his second international test appearance and debut for New Zealand during the All Blacks vs Japan test. Bridge replaced the injured Nehe Milner-Skudder off the bench at half-time and he scored two tries in the second half, including one off his first touch of the ball in international rugby. Bridge made his debut alongside Crusaders team-mates Brett Cameron and Mitchell Drummond, with the All Blacks beating Japan 69–31.

=== 2019–2020 ===
Having supplanted Rieko Ioane, Bridge became a regular starter for New Zealand in 2019. In his starting role, he scored a try against Australia on 17 August 2019 and on 7 September 2019, he scored 4 tries in New Zealand's 92–7 win over Tonga.

On 28 August, All Blacks coach, Steve Hansen named Bridge as one of 31 players in New Zealand's squad for the 2019 Rugby World Cup. Bridge played in 4 tests during the World Cup, starting in all of them, including New Zealand's 7–19 loss to England in the semi-final. Bridge was replaced by Jordie Barrett shortly after half-time, during the semi-final.

Bridge scored six tries for the Crusaders in 2020, including three in the revamped Super Rugby Aotearoa's inaugural season, following New Zealand's national lockdown during the COVID-19 pandemic. The Crusaders won Super Rugby Aotearoa.

Following selection for the South Island in the 2020 North vs South rugby union match, Bridge was once again selected for the All Blacks in a shortened test season, by new head coach, Ian Foster. Bridge played in their opening test of the 2020 season, a 16–16 draw against Australia, on 11 October at a near-capacity crowd in Wellington. Bridge did not play again in 2020, following an injury at training.

=== 2025 ===
In August 2025, Bridge signed a two-year deal with Perth-based Super Rugby team, the Western Force, to begin in 2026.

== Honours ==
- Rugby World Cup / Webb Ellis Cup
  - Third place: 2019
