= Baden Wardlaw =

New Zealand rugby union player

- Born: New Zealand
- Height: 198 cm (6 ft 6 in)
- Weight: 115 kg (254 lb; 18 st 2 lb)

Rugby union career
- Position: Flanker
Senior career
Years	Team	Apps	(Points)
2017–	Bay of Plenty	20	(0)
- Correct as of 12 November 2019
Super Rugby
Years	Team	Apps	(Points)
2020–	Blues	0	(0)
- Correct as of 12 November 2019

Baden Wardlaw (born in New Zealand) is a New Zealand rugby union player who plays for the Blues in Super Rugby. His playing position is flanker. He has signed for the Blues squad in 2020.

He made the Blues for 2020 after a stunning provincial season but was forced to retire in November 2019 after receiving medical advice and can never play rugby again. He was replaced by his Bay of Plenty teammate Aaron Carroll.
