= Tom Sanders (rugby union) =

New Zealand rugby union player (born 1994)

- Full name: Tom Bayley Sanders
- Born: 5 February 1994 (age 32) Christchurch, New Zealand
- Height: 190 cm (6 ft 3 in)
- Weight: 110 kg (243 lb; 17 st 5 lb)
- School: Lincoln High School

Rugby union career
- Position(s): Flanker, Number 8
Senior career
Years	Team	Apps	(Points)
2014–2020	Canterbury	50	(45)
2016–2017	Chiefs	22	(20)
2018–2021	Crusaders	26	(5)
2022–23	Suntory Sungoliath	7	(5)
2023	Otago	7	(0)
2024	Highlanders	5	(0)
- Correct as of 6 September 2020
International career
Years	Team	Apps	(Points)
2014	New Zealand U20	4	(5)
2020	South Island	1	(0)
- Correct as of 6 September 2020

Tom Bayley Sanders (born 5 February 1994) is a New Zealand rugby union player who currently plays as a loose forward for Canterbury in New Zealand's domestic Mitre 10 Cup and the Crusaders in the international Super Rugby competition. He also plays as a Number 8 position.

== Early career ==
Born in Christchurch and raised in the small town of Little River, Sanders attended Lincoln High School in the city of his birth, where he played first XV rugby for 3 years and was a member of the New Zealand Schools academy during that time. He initially played his rugby as a midfielder, but later in his teens switched to loose forward.

After graduating high school, he began studying for a Bachelor of Commerce in Agricultural Management at Lincoln University while also representing them in the local Canterbury club leagues.

== Senior career ==
Sanders started out his senior career with Canterbury during the 2014 ITM Cup, making his debut against Auckland in Week 1 of the competition. He had to settle for a place on the replacements bench most weeks but did come on to good effect and scored 3 tries in 8 appearances during the season. He played 10 times in 2015, rotating the starting duties with Reed Prinsep as Canterbury lifted the Premiership title with a 25–23 victory over Auckland in the final. Injury held him back in the early part of 2016, but he bounced back to start 7 times and score 1 try to help Canterbury to their 8th national provincial championship title in 9 seasons.

== Super Rugby ==
His displays in his first year of provincial rugby didn't go unnoticed and he was named as a member of the Crusaders wider training group for the 2015 Super Rugby season. It was largely a season of learning for Sanders, as the presence of All Black stalwarts such as Kieran Read and Richie McCaw in the Crusaders back row meant that he didn't see any game time.

His continued good work in New Zealand's domestic rugby competitions saw him named in the Chiefs squad in 2016. He scored 3 tries in 13 appearances during his first year in Hamilton as his new side reached the tournament's semi-finals before going down to New Zealand rivals, and eventual champions the Hurricanes in Wellington. He was retained in the squad for 2017.

== International career ==
Sanders was a surprise inclusion in the New Zealand Under-20 side which competed in the 2014 IRB Junior World Championship in his home country. Despite this, he was one of the standout loose forwards in the competition and scored 1 try in 4 appearances as his side finished in 3rd place. During his time at Lincoln University, he also represented the New Zealand Universities team.

== Career Honours ==
Canterbury

- Mitre 10 Cup Premiership - 2015, 2016

== Super Rugby Statistics ==
As of 10 December 2016

Season	Team	Games	Starts	Sub	Mins	Tries	Cons	Pens	Drops	Points	Yel	Red
2016	Chiefs	13	12	1	850	3	0	0	0	15	1	0
Total		13	12	1	850	3	0	0	0	15	1	0
