= Tom Robinson (rugby union) =

NZ rugby union player (born 1994)

- Born: 10 November 1994 (age 32) Kerikeri, New Zealand
- Height: 198 cm (6 ft 6 in)
- Weight: 110 kg (243 lb; 17 st 5 lb)
- School: Kerikeri High School
- Notable relative: Alastair Robinson (father)

Rugby union career
- Position(s): Flanker, Lock
Senior career
Years	Team	Apps	(Points)
2016–2022	Northland	25	(15)
2019–2023	Blues	55	(45)
2023–2024	Toyota Verblitz	4	(0)
- Correct as of 17 June 2023

Tom N. Robinson (born 10 November 1994) is a former New Zealand rugby union player. His position is Flanker. He was named in the Blues squad for the 2019 Super Rugby season. Robinson captained the Blues during the 2021 Super Rugby Aotearoa season in the absence of regular captain Patrick Tuipulotu.
