= Paul Williams (rugby union referee) =

French rugby union referee

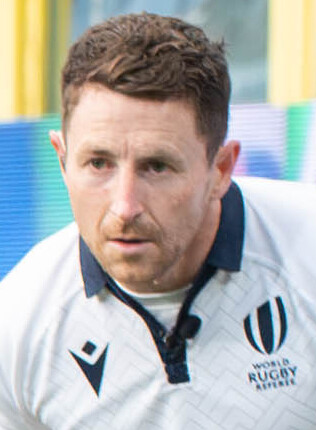
- Born: Paul Williams; 11 April 1985 (age 41) Waverley, Taranaki, New Zealand
- School: Francis Douglas Memorial College

Rugby union career
Refereeing career
Years	Competition	Apps
2016–pres.	Super Rugby	19
2016	World Rugby Under 20 Championship	4
2017–pres.	Test matches	5
- Correct as of 18 December 2018

Paul Williams (born 11 April 1985) is a professional rugby union referee from New Zealand who currently officiates matches in the Super Rugby competition and in international test matches.

Williams started refereeing in 2011 while still playing at halfback at club level and was appointed to the New Zealand High Performance referee squad in 2014. He quickly rose up the domestic ranks of refereeing, ultimately becoming a full-time referee on the Super Rugby panel in 2016, the first ever from Taranaki.

Williams refereed the 2016 World Rugby U20 Championship final between England and Ireland.

In June 2017, Williams took charge of his first international test match, between Italy and Scotland in Singapore.

In 2018, Williams refereed eight Super Rugby matches as well as three further Tier 1 tests.

Williams was selected to referee at the 2019 Rugby World Cup in Japan and the 2023 Rugby World Cup in France.
