= Tevita Nabura =

- Born: 2 June 1992 (age 34) Tailevu, Fiji
- Height: 192 cm (6 ft 4 in)
- Weight: 107 kg (16 st 12 lb; 236 lb)
- School: Ratu Kadavulevu School

Rugby union career
- Current team: Northland
Provincial / State sides
Years	Team	Apps	(Points)
2017–2020	Counties Manukau	22	(25)
2024–	Northland	2	(0)
- Correct as of 21 September 2024
Super Rugby
Years	Team	Apps	(Points)
2018	Highlanders	3	(0)
- Correct as of 21 September 2024

Tevita Nabura (born 2 June 1992) is a Fijian born New Zealand rugby union player who plays for Northland in the Bunnings NPC. His position is wing. He is the former head boy and rugby captain of Ratu Kadavulevu School.
