= Mike Fraser (rugby union) =

New Zealand rugby referee (born 1980)

- Born: Mike Fraser; 4 November 1980 (age 46) New Plymouth, New Zealand

Rugby union career
Refereeing career
Years	Competition	Apps
2013–present	Test matches	

Mike Fraser (born 4 November 1980) is a New Zealand Rugby union elite referee.

Fraser has been a member of the NZRU referee panel since 2007, and is recognised by World Rugby as an international referee. He made his refereeing debut during the 2013 end-of-year rugby union internationals, where he refereed Georgia vs the United States in Rustavi. He later refereed Wales' clash with Tonga in Cardiff. Before then, he was part of the referee panel for the 2013 IRB Junior World Championship, where he refereed the final between Wales and England, and has refereed in five World Rugby Sevens Series tournaments.

He annually represents the NZRU in the Super Rugby competition and the Wellington Rugby Football Union in the ITM Cup.

He is one of seven designated Assistant referees for the 2015 Rugby World Cup.
