= Jordan Hyland =

New Zealand rugby union player

- Full name: Jordan Carolan Hyland
- Born: 3 October 1989 (age 37) Auckland, New Zealand
- Height: 188 cm (6 ft 2 in)
- Weight: 102 kg (225 lb; 16 st 1 lb)
- School: Westlake Boys High School

Rugby union career
- Position(s): Wing, Centre, Fullback
Senior career
Years	Team	Apps	(Points)
2015–2021	Northland	57	(65)
2018, 2020	Blues	5	(10)
2019	Highlanders	4	(5)
- Correct as of 3 November 2021
International career
Years	Team	Apps	(Points)
2019	Māori All Blacks	2	(0)
- Correct as of 3 November 2021

Jordan S. Carolan Hyland (born 3 October 1989) is a former New Zealand rugby union player who played for Northland in the Bunnings NPC competition. His position of choice was wing. He also played for both the Blues and Highlanders in Super Rugby.
