= Sio Tomkinson =

NZ rugby union player (born 1996)

- Full name: Patelesio Fatuloa Tomkinson
- Born: 27 May 1996 (age 30) Dunedin, New Zealand
- Height: 182 cm (6 ft 0 in)
- Weight: 94 kg (207 lb; 14 st 11 lb)
- School: Otago Boys' High School

Rugby union career
- Position(s): Centre, Wing
- Current team: Otago, Highlanders
Senior career
Years	Team	Apps	(Points)
2015−2022	Otago	61	(59)
2017−2022	Highlanders	43	(70)
2022–2024	Dragons	24	(20)
2025	Force		
- Correct as of 12:07, 6 February 2024 (UTC)
International career
Years	Team	Apps	(Points)
2016	New Zealand U20	7	(10)
2020	South Island	0	(0)
- Correct as of 21 August 2020

Sio Tomkinson (born 27 May 1996) is a New Zealand rugby union player who currently plays as a centre for the Western Force in the Super Rugby Pacific competition. He has previously played for the Dragons RFC in the United Rugby Championship and for the Highlanders.

== Early career ==
Hailing from Otago on New Zealand's South Island, Tomkinson was originally schooled at Kavanagh College in Dunedin before switching to Otago Boys' High School in 2011. He enjoyed a hugely successful time with Otago Boys', winning the Highlanders' first XV competition in each of his seasons with the school as well as scoring a record number of points in a year, more than 450 in 2014. After leaving school, he began playing for the Harbour Hawks in the local Otago club rugby competition.

== Senior career ==
After signing a 2-year deal with the Otago Razorbacks in 2015, Tomkinson debuted for his home province in round 4 of the ITM Cup, a 17-34 defeat at home to Tasman. In total he played 6 games in his first year at provincial level as the Razorbacks finished 3rd on the championship log before going down comprehensively to Wellington in the competition's semi-finals. He got more game time as a 20-year-old in 2016, playing 10 of Otago's 12 games throughout a year which ended with them in 1st place on the championship log before they surprisingly lost out to North Harbour in the final which consigned them to another season of championship rugby in 2017.

In April 2022 it was announced that Tomkinson had signed for the Welsh club Dragons RFC in the United Rugby Championship for the 2022/23 season.

In October 2024 it was announced that Tomkinson had signed for the Western Force in the Super Rugby Pacific competition for the 2025 season.

== Super Rugby ==
An impressive debut season for the Razorbacks in provincial rugby in 2015 saw him named as a member of the Highlanders wider training group ahead of the 2016 Super Rugby season. The presence of experienced backline players such as Malakai Fekitoa, Matt Faddes and Rob Thompson in the Highlanders set-up meant that Tomkinson had to spend the year kicking his heels on the sidelines, however, in 2017, new Highlanders head-coach, Tony Brown promoted him to the senior squad.

== International ==
Tomkinson represented New Zealand Schools in 2014, scoring a try and being named MVP in their 34-24 win over Australia. He was also a member of the New Zealand Under-20 side which finished 5th in the 2016 World Rugby Under 20 Championship in England, scoring 2 tries in 5 matches.
