= Dillon Hunt =

- Born: 23 February 1995 (age 31) Auckland, New Zealand
- Height: 189 cm (6 ft 2 in)
- Weight: 103 kg (227 lb; 16 st 3 lb)
- School: Westlake Boys High School

Rugby union career
- Position: Flanker
- Current team: North Harbour, Blues
Senior career
| Years | Team | Apps | (Points) |
| 2015–2017 | Otago | 14 | (10) |
| 2017–2020 | Highlanders | 47 | (30) |
| 2018–2020 | North Harbour | 25 | (20) |
| 2021 | Blues | 0 | (0) |
- Correct as of 6 September 2020
International career
| Years | Team | Apps | (Points) |
| 2015 | New Zealand U20 | 1 | (10) |
| 2017 | Barbarian F.C. | 1 | (0) |
| 2017–2018 | New Zealand | 2 | (0) |
| 2018 | World XV | 1 | (0) |
| 2020 | South Island | 1 | (0) |
- Correct as of 6 September 2020

Dillon Hunt (born 23 February 1995) is a New Zealand former rugby union player who played for the Highlanders in the Super Rugby competition. His position of choice was flanker.

== Career ==
Hunt was called into the Highlanders squad in 2017 as an injury replacement after the team was ravaged by injuries to other loose forwards. Hunt started for the Highlanders against the touring British and Irish Lions side on 13 June 2017, taking part in the 23–22 win and delivering a solid 58 minute performance before being replaced by fellow rookie James Lentjes.

After representing the Barbarian F.C. off the bench in a 22–31 loss against the All Blacks, Hunt and fellow Barbarians back-rower Luke Whitelock were called into the All Blacks squad as injury replacements for 81-test veteran Jerome Kaino who was injured against the Barbarians side. Hunt made his debut for New Zealand against a French XV on 14 November 2017, replacing Ardie Savea off the bench with ten minutes left of the 28–23 win.

Hunt was re-signed for the Highlanders and with Otago for the 2018 season. Since his re-signing, Hunt became a regular starter for the Highlanders and started in every Highlanders fixture of the 2018 Super Rugby season. His form for both the Highlanders and North Harbour saw him recalled to the wider training squad for the All Blacks end of year tour, where he earned his official test debut off the bench against Japan.

After four seasons at the Highlanders, Hunt signed with the Blues for the 2021 season. However, ongoing concussion problems saw him never take the field for the team.

Hunt confirmed his retirement from all professional rugby in November 2021, citing the same recurrent concussion symptoms that kept him off the field that same year.
