= Sam Nock =

NZ Maori rugby union player (born 1996)

- Born: 18 June 1996 (age 30) Whangārei, New Zealand
- Height: 178 cm (5 ft 10 in)
- Weight: 85 kg (187 lb; 13 st 5 lb)
- School: St. Kentigern College

Rugby union career
- Position: Halfback
- Current team: Northland, Shimizu Koto Blue Sharks
Senior career
Years	Team	Apps	(Points)
2015–2026	Northland	105	(132)
2016–2026	Blues	90	(30)
2026–	Shimizu Koto Blue Sharks	0	(0)
- Correct as of 26 October 2026
International career
Years	Team	Apps	(Points)
2016	New Zealand U20	7	(15)
2018–2026	Māori All Blacks	8	(25)
- Correct as of 26 October 2026

Sam J. Nock (born 18 June 1996) is a New Zealand rugby union player who currently plays as a halfback for Northland in the National Provincial Championship (NPC) and the Shimizu Koto Blue Sharks in the Japan Rugby League One.

== Early career ==
Attending Saint Kentigern College in Auckland, Nock's talent was clear from an early age as he played for their top side for 3 years and captained them to national and world schools championship titles in his senior year.

== Senior career ==
In his first year out of school, Nock returned home to play for the Northland Taniwha. He played all 10 games for them during what proved to be a torrid 2015 campaign which saw them finish bottom of the Championship standings with no wins to show for their efforts. He continued to be first choice number 9 for the Taniwha in 2016, but injury ended his season early after he had started the first 7 games of the year.

Because of Nock's promise as a school boy at Saint Kentigern College the Blues Super Rugby franchise announced in June 2015 that they'd signed him on a 3 year contract before he'd even played any national provincial championship rugby. He gained a season's experience at provincial level before joining up with the Blues ahead of the 2016 Super Rugby season. He spent the season as third choice halfback behind Bryn Hall and Billy Guyton. When Guyton fell ill prior to the match against the Hurricanes at Eden Park, Nock was called into the Blues 23 man squad and debuted as a second half replacement for Bryn Hall in a 19-23 loss.

In the quarter final of the 2022 Super Rugby Pacific season Nock played his 50th game for the Blues against the Highlanders.

In October 2026, Nock joined the Shimizu Koto Blue Sharks in Division 2 of the Japan Rugby League One (JRLO).

== International career ==
Nock represented New Zealand Schoolboys in 2014 and then was a member of the New Zealand Under 20 side which finished 5th in the 2016 World Rugby Under 20 Championship which was held in England. After first playing for the Māori All Blacks in 2018 Nock was again named in the side in 2021.

== Personal life ==
Nock is a New Zealander of Māori descent (Ngāpuhi descent).
