= Andrew Makalio =

NZ rugby union player (born 1992)

- Born: 22 January 1992 (age 34) Auckland, New Zealand
- Height: 182 cm (6 ft 0 in)
- Weight: 111 kg (245 lb; 17 st 7 lb)
- School: Onehunga High School

Rugby union career
- Position(s): Hooker, Prop
- Current team: Toshiba Brave Lupus
Senior career
Years	Team	Apps	(Points)
2015	Wairarapa Bush	10	(40)
2016–2022	Tasman	65	(85)
2017–2021	Crusaders	43	(20)
2022–2023	Highlanders	23	(30)
2023–2025	Kintetsu Liners	10	(10)
2025–	Toshiba Brave Lupus	9	(10)
- Correct as of 3 June 2023
International career
Years	Team	Apps	(Points)
2017	New Zealand Barbarians	1	(0)
2019	Barbarian F.C.	2	(0)
2022	All Blacks XV	1	(0)
- Correct as of 3 June 2023

Andrew Makalio (born 22 January 1992) is a New Zealand rugby union player.

== Early career ==
Originally from Auckland, Makalio started playing rugby at the age of 15 while attending Onehunga High School. He made his way through the Auckland club rugby scene and was named man of the match as his side, Grammar TEC lifted the Gallaher Shield in 2015. Unable to crack the Auckland Mitre 10 Cup team, he headed south to play for Marlborough based side Harlequins in 2016.

== Senior career ==
Makalio's move south proved to be a fruitful one as after just one season in Marlborough club rugby, he was chosen to replace the departing Quentin MacDonald in the Tasman Mako squad for the 2016 Mitre 10 Cup. He instantly established himself as the first choice in the number 2 jersey, making 11 appearances, 10 of them from the start and scoring 2 tries as the Mako finished as Premiership runners up in 2016. He was part of the Tasman team that won the Mitre 10 Cup in 2019 for the first time. Makalio was selected in the South Island squad for the North vs South rugby union match in 2020 but did not play. In Round 9 of the 2020 Mitre 10 Cup Makalio played his 50th game for the Mako against Canterbury. The Mako went on to win their second premiership title in a row. Makalio played only 6 games for Tasman during the 2021 Bunnings NPC due to injury as the Mako made the final before losing 23–20 to Waikato.

== Super Rugby ==
After just one full season and 11 appearances at provincial level, Makalio was handed a Super Rugby contract by the Crusaders ahead of the 2017 Super Rugby season. The side went on to win the title and then backed it up in 2018 and 2019 making it 3 in row. The team also won the Super Rugby Aotearoa competition in 2020. Makalio was ruled out of the 2021 Super Rugby season with a neck injury suffered late in the 2020 Mitre 10 Cup playing for Tasman. The Crusaders went on to make it number 5 in a row with a 24-13 win against the Chiefs in the final. Makalio moved south to the Highlanders for the 2022 Super Rugby Pacific season to replace Ash Dixon.
