= Sione Misiloi =

New Zealand rugby union player

- Born: 3 November 1994 (age 32) New Zealand
- Height: 190 cm (6 ft 3 in)
- Weight: 108 kg (238 lb; 17 st 0 lb)
- School: St Kevin’s College

Rugby union career
- Position: Flanker
Senior career
Years	Team	Apps	(Points)
2016	North Otago	8	(0)
2018–2020	Otago	29	(0)
2021	Southland	4	(0)
Super Rugby
Years	Team	Apps	(Points)
2020	Highlanders	0	(0)
2024	Waratahs	2	(0)
International career
Years	Team	Apps	(Points)
2026	Tonga	1	

Sione Misiloi (born 3 November 1994 in New Zealand) is a New Zealand rugby union player who plays for the Highlanders in Super Rugby. His playing position is flanker. He has signed for the Highlanders squad in 2020.

== Early career ==
Raised in the town of Oamaru, located near Dunedin on New Zealand's South Island, Misiloi was educated at St Kevin's College where he was a member of their First XV. He played one season for North Otago in the 2016 Heartland Championship, making 8 appearances as they went on to win the Lochore Cup.

== Professional career ==
Misiloi first played provincial rugby for Otago in 2018, making 29 appearances across three seasons before signing with Southland for 2021.

=== Super Rugby ===
After strong showings for Otago during the Mitre 10 Cup, Misiloi was rewarded with a Super Rugby contract with the Dunedin-based Highlanders ahead of the 2020 season. He was retained by the Highlanders for 2021, although never made an official appearance across both seasons.

A switch to play for Randwick in the Shute Shield brought about new opportunities within the Waratahs, where he was included in a trial match ahead of the 2024 season.

Late withdrawals in the Waratahs side prior to kick-off, lead to Misiloi's inclusion in the side for their Round 6 match against the Rebels. He would go on to make his debut from the reserves bench, before being included for their following match against the Brumbies.

== International career ==
On July 18th 2026, Misiloi made his international debut for the Tonga, against Portugal in Round 3 of the 2026 World Rugby Nations Cup.
