= TJ Faiane =

New Zealand rugby union player

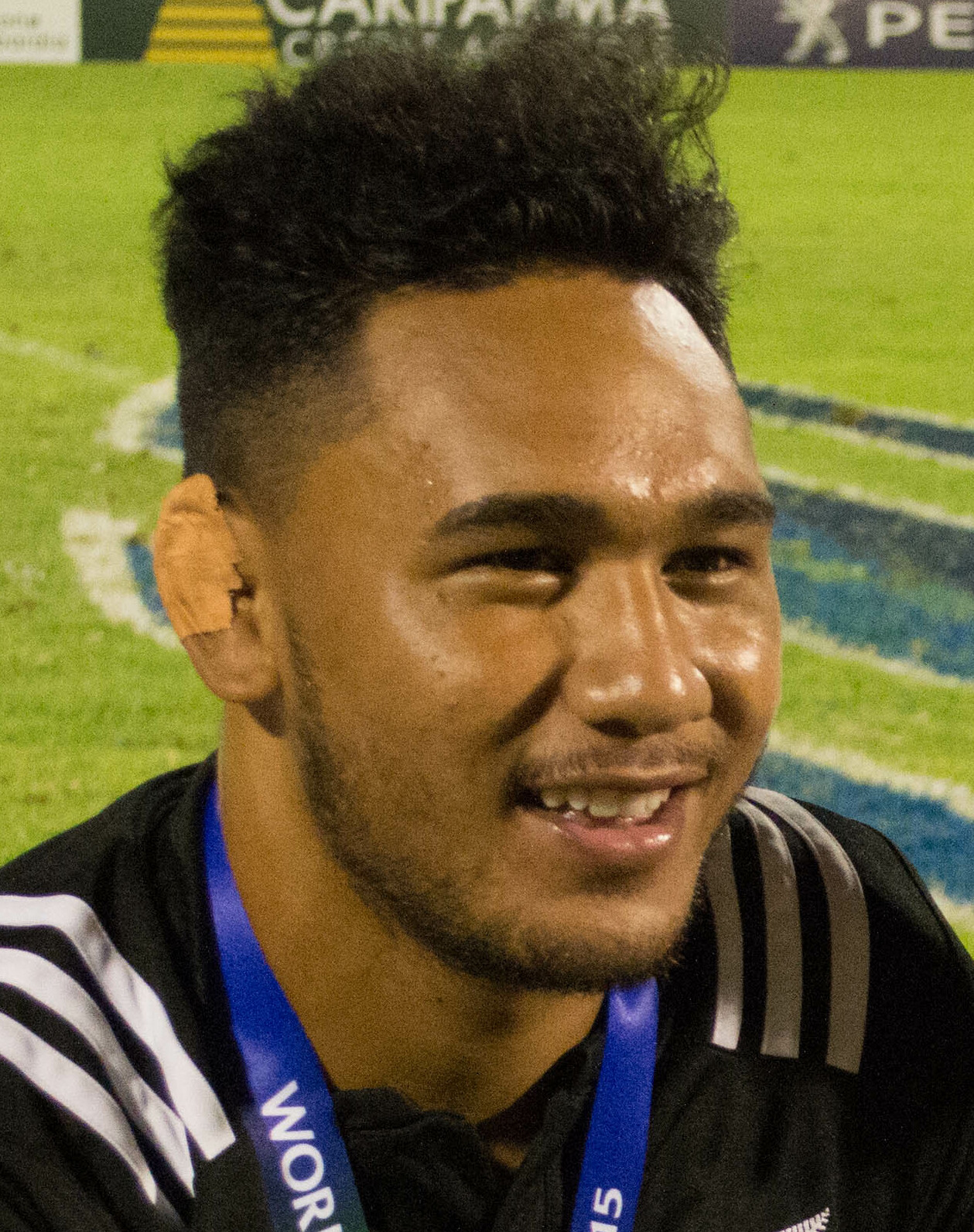
- Full name: Tinoai Faiane
- Born: 24 August 1995 (age 31) Auckland, New Zealand
- Height: 1.75 m (5 ft 9 in)
- Weight: 92 kg (14 st 7 lb; 203 lb)
- School: Saint Kentigern College

Rugby union career
- Position: Midfield Back
- Current team: Secom Rugguts
Senior career
Years	Team	Apps	(Points)
2014–2021	Auckland	45	(45)
2017−2021	Blues	54	(30)
2022-2023	Hino Red Dolphins	7	(0)
2023-	Secom Rugguts	28	(25)
- Correct as of 26 November 2021
International career
Years	Team	Apps	(Points)
2013	New Zealand Schools		
2014−15	New Zealand Under-20	9	(10)
- Correct as of 29 October 2016

TJ Faiane (born 24 August 1995) is a New Zealand rugby union player who currently plays as a midfield back for Auckland in New Zealand's domestic Mitre 10 Cup and the Blues in the international Super Rugby competition.

== Early career ==
A teenage prodigy, Faiane made a big impression playing first XV rugby for Saint Kentigern College in Auckland, helping them win 3 successive 1A Championship titles.

== Senior career ==
Aged just 18, Faiane was named in the Auckland squad for the 2014 ITM Cup, and he went on to make 7 appearances for them during the season, 5 of which were from the start. Injuries ruled him out of the 2015 and 2016 seasons so he has so far been unable to add to his seven provincial caps.

== Super Rugby ==
Despite missing the entire 2015 New Zealand domestic season through injury, new Blues head-coach Tana Umaga sprang a surprise ahead of the 2016 Super Rugby season when he named Faiane as a member of the franchise's wider training group. Once again injuries hindered him and he didn't make any appearances during the year. Despite this, he was given a full contract for the 2017 season.

== International ==
Faiane represented New Zealand schools in 2013 and was a member of the New Zealand Under 20 squads which competed in the 2014 and 2015 World Rugby Under 20 Championships, finishing in 3rd and 1st places respectively.

== Career Honours ==
New Zealand Under-20

- World Rugby Under 20 Championship - 2015
