= Mitchell Drummond =

New Zealand rugby union player

- Full name: Mitchell David Drummond
- Born: 15 February 1994 (age 32) Nelson, New Zealand
- Height: 180 cm (5 ft 11 in)
- Weight: 87 kg (192 lb; 13 st 10 lb)
- School: Nelson College; Nayland College

Rugby union career
- Position: Halfback
- Current team: Tasman, Crusaders
Senior career
Years	Team	Apps	(Points)
2013–2024	Canterbury	102	(139)
2014–	Crusaders	151	(112)
2025–	Tasman	12	(5)
- Correct as of 9 October 2026
International career
Years	Team	Apps	(Points)
2014	New Zealand U20	4	(10)
2017	Barbarian F.C.	1	(0)
2018	New Zealand	1	(0)
- Correct as of 9 October 2026

Mitchell David Drummond (born 15 February 1994) is a New Zealand rugby union player who currently plays as a halfback for Tasman in the Bunnings NPC.

== Early career ==
Born and raised in Nelson in the South Island of New Zealand, Drummond attended Nelson College where he captained their top side. During his school years, he represented his province at both rugby and cricket before focusing solely on rugby after graduation. After many years in the Tasman youth structures, he moved to Christchurch and joined the Canterbury Rugby Academy in 2013.

== Senior career ==
Drummond was first named in Canterbury's 2013 ITM Cup squad where the then 19 year old largely served as back up to the more experienced Andy Ellis and Willi Heinz. He managed only 1 appearance during the campaign, as a substitute against Manawatu, however Ellis' departure for Japan in 2014 saw him get far more game time in rotation with Heinz. He played 10 games during the season, 5 of which came from the start and scored 7 points as Canterbury were disappointingly knocked out in the ITM Cup semi finals by local rivals, Tasman.

Willi Heinz's departure for Gloucester in 2015, left the 21 year old Drummond as Canterbury's undisputed first choice in the number 9 jersey. He went on to play all 12 of Canterbury's games during their 2015 title winning season which finished with a 25–23 victory over Auckland in the final. 2016 saw a reversal of fortunes for him as a broken leg picked up in training resulted in him playing only the first three games of the year as his side marched to their 8th provincial title in 9 seasons.

== Super Rugby ==
After just one provincial appearance for Canterbury, Drummond was named in the Crusaders squad ahead of the 2014 season. Unsurprisingly, his first season at Super Rugby level saw him sit behind his experienced Canterbury teammates, Ellis and Heinz, in the queue for the starting halfback role and like his debut provincial season, he only managed a single substitute appearance, this time against the Melbourne Rebels.

Building from his learning experiences in 2014, Drummond was far more of a regular in 2015. Willi Heinz was ruled out of the entire season through injury and Drummond largely served as back up to Andy Ellis, playing 15 times, including 7 starts and scoring 2 tries as the Crusaders finished in 7th place on the table, just outside the play off places. 2016 again saw him act as back up to the experienced Ellis, who was in his final season with the franchise. Drummond scored an impressive 4 tries in 13 games of which he started 5 as the Crusaders reached the competition's quarter finals before losing 42–25 to the Lions in Johannesburg. He was retained as part of the squad for the 2017 season where he would face competition from new arrival from the Blues, Bryn Hall for a place in the starting lineup.

== International ==
Drummond made the New Zealand Barbarians secondary schools team in 2012 and was also a member of the New Zealand Under-20 which finished 3rd in the 2014 IRB Junior World Championship in his home country, scoring 2 tries in 4 matches during the tournament.

Drummond was selected for the Barbarians in 2017, coming off the bench against New Zealand. Drummond and some other Barbarians representatives joined New Zealand's squad following the match, with Drummond making his debut for the All Blacks only 10 days later replacing the departing Tawera Kerr-Barlow with 10 minutes left. The All Blacks won against the French side, 28-23 and Drummond was one of five debutants that day, all of whom had represented the Barbarians against their new teammates the week prior.

A year on from his international debut, Drummond was re called to the All Blacks, as a member of Steve Hansen's 51 man squad, travelling to the Northern Hemisphere for the 2018 end-of-year tour. As a member of the wider training squad, Drummond remained in Japan after the first choice team travelled to Europe. He played his first test for New Zealand during the wider training squad's time in Japan, replacing fellow rookie, Te Toiroa Tahuriorangi, 59 minutes into the test against Japan, on 3 November 2018. The All Blacks won the test by 69–31, with Drummond being one of eight players, including his Crusaders teammates, George Bridge and Brett Cameron, making their test debut for New Zealand.
