= Braydon Ennor =

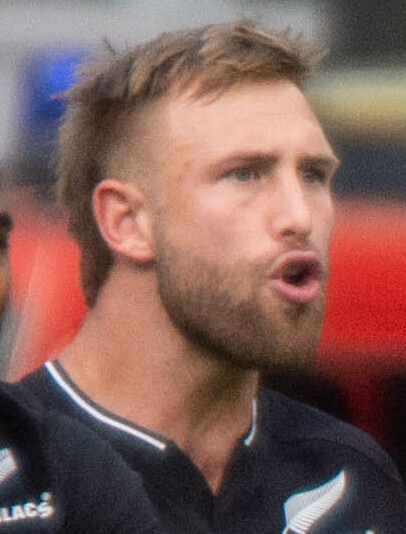
- Braydon Ennor in 2021
- Full name: Braydon Maurice Ennor
- Born: 16 July 1997 (age 29) Auckland, New Zealand
- Height: 187 cm (6 ft 2 in)
- Weight: 94 kg (207 lb; 14 st 11 lb)
- School: St. Kentigern College

Rugby union career
- Position: Centre / Wing
- Current team: Canterbury, Crusaders
Senior career
Years	Team	Apps	(Points)
2017–2025	Canterbury	49	(105)
2018–2026	Crusaders	84	(135)
2026-	Perpignan	0	(0)
- Correct as of 26 July 2026
International career
Years	Team	Apps	(Points)
2017	New Zealand U20	5	(20)
2019–2023	New Zealand	9	(5)
2020	South Island	1	(0)
2022-2026	All Blacks XV	3	(5)
- Correct as of 26 July 2026

Braydon Maurice Ennor (born 16 July 1997) is a New Zealand rugby union player who currently plays as a wing and centre for Canterbury in the Bunnings NPC and the Crusaders in Super Rugby.

== Youth and school ==
Ennor was born in Auckland, New Zealand. He studied at, captained and represented Saint Kentigern College in rugby, generally playing centre. He made the Blues Under 18 Development side in 2014. He was the Hamilton House Leader and was awarded The Bruce Palmer Memorial Cup for the Boys Runner-up to the Dux Ludorum as well as The Headmaster's Medal for Service House Leader Hamilton in his final year and St Kentigern.

After graduating high school, In early 2016, he went to the University of Canterbury on a scholarship for a Bachelor of Engineering, after getting snapped up by the Crusaders Academy side. He represented Canterbury in the Jock Hobbs Memorial National U19 tournament after returning from a 9-month ACL injury in September 2015. after which he went onto represent the Crusaders development team, The Knights in 2017.

== Canterbury and the Crusaders ==
In August 2017, he was named in the Canterbury side for the 2017 Mitre 10 Cup. He made his debut on 1 September against Hawkes Bay scoring 2 tries on debut. He scored 4 tries in the following game against Southland. His performance saw him getting signed by the Crusaders for the 2018 and 2019 Super Rugby season.

Ennor was not named in the Crusaders' 2024 squad due to a season-long injury. However, he was named in the Crusaders squad for the 2025 Super Rugby Pacific season.

== International career ==
Ennor's performance for the Crusader Knights in 2017 saw him getting picked by the New Zealand under-20 for the Oceania Under 20 tournament in April 2017 after which he was named in the NZ u20 side for the 2017 World Rugby Under 20 Championship in Georgia. He helped NZ win the 2017 tournament. He played in 4 of the 5 games at outside centre including the final and he scored 2 tries in the tournament.

Ennor made his international debut for New Zealand in 2019, in a 20–16 win over Argentina. While he wasn't selected for the 2019 Rugby World Cup, Ennor earned an initial re-call in 2020 under new Head Coach, Ian Foster. However, a repeated ACL injury meant Ennor did not play for the All Blacks again until 2021, which was a 36–13 win over Argentina in Brisbane.

In total, Ennor would play 8 test matches during the Foster era, scoring his first test try during a fixture against Japan in 2022. Although Ennor had a strong performance in the 13 jersey against Australia on 5 August 2023, he would ultimately miss out on the 2023 Rugby World Cup after another ACL injury saw Dallas McLeod replace Ennor during the match.
