= Tom Christie (rugby union) =

New Zealand rugby union player

- Full name: Thomas Michael Christie
- Born: 4 March 1998 (age 28) Christchurch, New Zealand
- Height: 185 cm (6 ft 1 in)
- Weight: 105 kg (231 lb; 16 st 7 lb)
- School: Shirley Boys' High School

Rugby union career
- Position: Flanker
- Current team: Newcastle Red Bulls
Senior career
| Years | Team | Apps | (Points) |
| 2017–2025 | Canterbury | 67 | (50) |
| 2020–2025 | Crusaders | 60 | (35) |
| 2025– | Newcastle Red Bulls | 9 | (10) |
- Correct as of 14 August 2025
International career
| Years | Team | Apps | (Points) |
| 2017–2018 | New Zealand U20 | 15 | (45) |
| 2020 | South Island | 1 | (0) |
- Correct as of 10 October 2024

Tom Christie (born 4 March 1998 in New Zealand) is a New Zealand rugby union player who plays for Prem Rugby side Newcastle Red Bulls. His playing position is flanker.

== Rugby career ==
Christie played for the New Zealand U20's rugby union team, winning the World Rugby U20 Championship in 2017 and captaining his side in the 2018 edition. In 2020, Christie played for the South Island team in the North vs South match, the first of its kind in 8 years. Tom Christie captained Canterbury to a victory in the 2025 Bunnings NPC in his final game for Canterbury.

On 14 August 2025, it was announced that Christie had signed a two-year deal with Newcastle Red Bulls, with Director of Rugby Steve Diamond describing the signing as "a real statement of intent". Christie is scheduled to join Newcastle after the conclusion of the 2025 Bunnings NPC.

On 28 November 2025, Christie made his Newcastle debut, playing 77 minutes during a 17–39 loss against Leicester Tigers.

== Honours ==
Crusaders

- Super Rugby Champion, 2022, 2023, 2025

Canterbury

- Mitre 10 Cup Champion, 2017
- Bunnings NPC Champion, 2025
