= Harry Plummer (rugby union) =

- Born: 19 June 1998 (age 28) Auckland, New Zealand
- Height: 184 cm (6 ft 0 in)
- Weight: 94 kg (207 lb; 14 st 11 lb)
- School: St. Peter's College

Rugby union career
- Position: First five-eighth
- Current team: Auckland, Blues
Senior career
Years	Team	Apps	(Points)
2017–	Auckland	56	(386)
2019–2025	Blues	75	(236)
2025-	Clermont	28	(304)
- Correct as of 5 November 2024
International career
Years	Team	Apps	(Points)
2018	New Zealand U20	8	(100)
2024–	New Zealand	1	(0)
- Correct as of 5 November 2024

Harry Plummer (born 19 June 1998) is a New Zealand rugby union player who plays as a First five eighth for Clermont in the French Top 14 and Auckland in the Bunnings NPC.

== Career ==
On September 21 2024, Plummer made his All Blacks debut off the bench in a 31–28 win over Australia.

On November 20 2024, it was confirmed that Plummer would join French side Clermont from the start of the 2025/26 season on a three-year deal. He finished the season as the top points scorer in the Top 14, with 295 points.
