= Reed Prinsep =

- Born: 17 February 1993 (age 33) Christchurch, New Zealand
- Height: 192 cm (6 ft 4 in)
- Weight: 116 kg (256 lb; 18 st 4 lb)
- School: Christchurch Boys' High School
- Notable relative: Blair Prinsep (brother)

Rugby union career
- Position(s): Flanker, Number 8
- Current team: Western Force
Senior career
Years	Team	Apps	(Points)
2014–2023	Canterbury	83	(30)
2016	Crusaders	1	(0)
2017–2023	Hurricanes	73	(30)
2024–2025	Western Force	25	(5)
- Correct as of 28 June 2025
International career
Years	Team	Apps	(Points)
2016–2022	Māori All Blacks	10	(0)
- Correct as of 16 July 2022

Reed Prinsep (born 17 February 1993) is a New Zealand rugby union player who currently plays as a loose forward for the Western Force in the international Super Rugby competition.

== Early career ==
Born and raised in Canterbury, Prinsep attended and played rugby at Christchurch Boys' High School before going on to study law and commerce at the University of Canterbury. During this time he was involved with both Canterbury and the Crusaders youth structures, being named as Canterbury Colts player of the year in 2014 and also being a member of the Crusaders Academy and the Crusaders Knights development side.

== Senior career ==
Prinsep was a member of Canterbury's wider training group in 2014 and made 2 appearances before gaining a full contract in 2015. He played 11 times that season to help Canterbury regain their Premiership title and went onto make a further 11 appearances the following season as Canterbury were crowned champions for an 8th time in 9 seasons. In the 2020 season, Prinsep became captain of the Canterbury team.

== Super Rugby ==
Excellent form for Canterbury meant that it was a surprise that he was unable to earn a Super Rugby contract in 2016. He did train as part of the Crusaders' wider training group during the season and made his Super Rugby debut as a substitute in a match at home to the Chiefs.

Subsequent excellent performances for Canterbury during the 2016 Mitre 10 Cup saw him signed up on a 2-year deal by defending Super Rugby champions, the Hurricanes ahead of the 2017 Super Rugby season.

Prinsep was released by the Hurricanes ahead of the 2024 season. He joined the Western Force midway through the 2024 season.

== International ==
Prinsep was named in the Māori All Blacks squad for their northern hemisphere tour in November 2016. He debuted in the number 6 jersey in a 27–14 defeat to Munster on 11 November 2016, playing the full 80 minutes with the exception of a 10-minute spell in the sin-bin for a yellow card offence in the 30th minute. One week later he played the second half as a replacement for Shane Christie as the Māori overcame Harlequins by a score of 26–10.

== Career honours ==
Canterbury

- National Provincial Championship – 2015, 2016, 2017
