= Brett Cameron =

NZ international rugby union player

- Full name: Brett Dennis Cameron
- Born: 4 October 1996 (age 30) Whanganui, New Zealand
- Height: 175 cm (5 ft 9 in)
- Weight: 82 kg (181 lb; 12 st 13 lb)
- School: Cullinane College
- University: Lincoln University

Rugby union career
- Position: First five-eighth
- Current team: Manawatu, Hurricanes
Senior career
Years	Team	Apps	(Points)
2017–2020	Canterbury	44	(354)
2018–2020	Crusaders	13	(19)
2021–	Manawatu	16	(162)
2022	Kamaishi Seawaves	11	(50)
2023–	Hurricanes	7	(41)
- Correct as of 25 July 2023
International career
Years	Team	Apps	(Points)
2018	New Zealand	1	(0)
- Correct as of 17 March 2023

Brett Dennis Cameron (born 4 October 1996) is a New Zealand rugby union player. A first five-eighth, Cameron plays for Manawatu at a provincial level and the Hurricanes in the Super Rugby competition. He made his debut for the New Zealand national side, the All Blacks, on 3 November 2018 as a substitute in the test match against Japan in Tokyo.
