= Tasman Rugby Union =

New Zealand regional rugby union governing body

- Sport: Rugby union
- Abbreviation: TRU
- Founded: 2006; 20 years ago
- Affiliation: New Zealand Rugby
- Regional affiliation: Tasman Bay / Te Tai-o-Aorere
- Headquarters: Nelson

Official website
- www.tasmanrugby.co.nz
- (New Zealand)

The Tasman Rugby Union is the governing body for rugby union in Tasman Bay / Te Tai-o-Aorere, a bay at the north end of the South Island in New Zealand. Headquartered in Nelson, TRU is New Zealand's newest provincial union, founded in 2006 with the amalgamation of the existing Marlborough and Nelson Bays sub unions.

The union's premier team is the Tasman Mako which compete in New Zealand's provincial rugby competition, the National Provincial Championship.

== History ==
When the New Zealand Rugby Union (NZRU) reviewed the domestic competitions in 2005, a new 14 team premier division of competition was created, as the Air New Zealand Cup, taking the place of the National Provincial Championship (NPC).

The restructured domestic competition opened the door for the Nelson Bays and Marlborough Rugby Unions to form a relationship, forming one organisation in an attempt to be awarded a position in the new competition.

=== Early years: 2006 to 2010 ===
A Tasman 15 played Canada 'A' on April 26, 2006 at Trafalgar Park. The Tasman side won by 40 points, the final score being 48 points to 8. The Mako were grouped in Pool A of the 2006 Air New Zealand Cup.

In their first ever match in the Air New Zealand Cup, the Mako earned a bonus point in a loss to the North Harbour team, losing 33 points to 27. They were defeated by Auckland the following week by 40 points. However, the Mako won their first match in round three, defeating Manawatu by 43 points to 0. Their only other win of the season came at home against Northland, with an impressive 56–15 win. Despite the season record of just 2 wins and 7 losses, the Mako showed the ability to compete and provided a platform to build for the future. Ti'i Paulo captained the side.

The 2007 season was disappointing for the Mako, finishing the season with a record of 2 wins and 8 losses. Wins came against Hawke's Bay and Manawatu, with close losses against Waikato and Canterbury.

Early on in the 2008 season, the NZRU announced that Tasman and Northland would be relegated from the competition at the end of the season, due to failing to meet a set of criteria including financial stability. With the axe hovering over them, the Mako produced their best season yet, silencing their critics.

In round 2 against Waikato, Tasman first five Miah Nikora nailed a stunning last minute drop goal to snatch a 14–16 victory and claim the Mako first scalp over a major union. This was followed with wins over Taranaki, Northland, Manawatu and a draw against Otago to see the Mako finish the season 7th on the ladder. Facing a strong Canterbury side in the quarter-finals, the Mako lost 48–10. However, their strong season coupled with public pressure forced the NZRU to reverse its decision and announce that Tasman and Northland would remain in the competition.

There were doubts as to whether Tasman would contest the 2009 Air New Zealand Cup, with funding issues and disagreement amongst its stakeholders on its future. However, these disputes were resolved and Tasman finished the 2009 season in 9th place with 6 wins and 7 losses, with their most memorable performance coming in round 9 against Auckland. Tasman won 12–8 in the most significant result of their short history. The Mako had come from the brink of extinction to topple the biggest union in the country.

2010 was disappointing for the Mako, finishing the season in 12th place on the ladder with just 4 wins, failing to hold on to their mid table status achieved in the previous two seasons. However, the Mako managed to upset eventual champions and neighbours Canterbury in round 4, with a famous 27–25 victory at Trafalgar Park.

=== Championship division: 2011 to 2013 ===
In 2011, the ITM Cup was restructured into two competitions, with the top 7 teams competing for the Premiership title and the next 7 teams competing for the Championship title. Each province played the other 6 teams in their own division once, plus 4 interdivisional matches.

The Tasman Mako played in the Championship for 2011. Despite taking just 2 wins and finishing in last spot for the season, the Mako were well received by their fans by playing a positive attacking brand of rugby that included 4 losses by 4 points or less. Upset victories were achieved against Hawke's Bay 21–19 in Napier, and Auckland (again) 30–28 in Nelson. Shane Christie and James Marshall were selected for the New Zealand sevens team that year.

2012 was a good season for the Mako, recording a win over Canterbury to start their season the Mako went on to win 5 out of their 10 round robin games and made the semi-final where they lost to Otago 41-34.

In 2013 for the first time in their short history the Mako gained promotion to the Premiership division as they won the Championship playing 12 games in the season and coming away with 10 wins, including a 49-28 win over Southland in the semi-final at Lansdowne Park and the victory which sent them to the Premiership which was a tight 26-25 win over Hawke's Bay at Trafalgar Park.

=== Premiership division: 2014 to 2021 ===
Tasman was promoted to the ITM Cup Premiership division for the 2014 season.

The Mako had a successful first year in the Premiership in 2014, making it all the way to the Premiership final where they lost 36-32 to Taranaki at Yarrow Stadium. The Mako played 12 games in the 2014 season with 8 wins, 3 losses and a 16-16 draw against Auckland at Eden Park.

2015 was again a solid year for the Mako, playing 11 games with 7 wins and 4 losses. The Mako made it to the semi-final but lost 44-24 against Auckland at Eden Park.

2016 and 2017 were very similar years for the Mako, making the final in both seasons. The 2016 season saw the Mako play 12 games with 8 wins, 3 losses and a 27-27 draw against North Harbour at North Harbour Stadium. While the 2017 season saw the Mako play 12 games, winning 7 and losing 5. Both years though saw the Mako go down to Canterbury in the final, played at Christchurch Stadium both years, with the 2016 scoreline being 43-27 and the 2017 scoreline being 35-13. The team also went through a rebrand, changing the logo and team colours ahead of the 2016 season. The logo was later changed back after it received widespread criticism.

2018 was again a very good year for the Mako, winning 9 out of 10 of their round robin fixtures - losing only to Auckland 36-10 at Eden Park. The team made the semi-finals but lost 16-21 to Canterbury in a controversial game at Trafalgar Park. 20 of the Mako squad from the 2018 season would go on to earn Super Rugby contracts for the 2019 Super Rugby season. Ahead of the 2018 season, the team changed their name from the Tasman Makos to Tasman Mako, with 'Mako' being the correct plural of the Māori name.

After just 14 seasons the Tasman Mako reached the pinnacle of New Zealand provincial rugby, winning the 2019 Mitre 10 Cup and doing it unbeaten. After going through the round robin with 10 wins from 10 games the Mako played Auckland at Lansdowne Park coming away with an 18-9 win in a game that went right down to the wire. The Mako then had their fourth crack at the Premiership title when they faced Wellington at Trafalgar Park and it was fourth time lucky as the Mako came away with the win 31-14.

The Mako became just the second team to win back to back premiership titles, winning the 2020 Mitre 10 Cup. Hit hard by injury and without many players from their 2019 heroics the Mako were not as dominant in 2020 with heavy losses in the regular season to North Harbour (40-24), Auckland (31-10) and Canterbury (0-29). The Mako finished second on the premiership standings and came up against Bay of Plenty in the semi-final at Trafalgar Park, coming away with the win 19-10. They qualified for their sixth final in eight years, coming up against Auckland at Eden Park. In what was a thrilling game the Mako came away with the win 12-13.

Tasman were unable to defend their premiership title in 2021, it was a great start to the season with wins over Bay of Plenty (14–27), Auckland (16–11) and Northland (29–48) before the side suffered a first loss 22–39 at the hands of Waikato. The Mako bounced back thumping Southland 51–14 before having a crack at the Ranfurly Shield against Hawke's Bay where they were again unsuccessful 34–22. The side then played a non competition match against Bay of Plenty in miserable conditions, coming away with the win 26–9. A third loss came against Canterbury 24–20 in Christchurch meaning it was a must win game for the Mako in Round 10 against Wellington where they came away with an impressive 34–22 win. Hawke's Bay were favourites ahead of the semi-final in Napier after losing only 1 game in the regular season, Tasman came up big hanging on to win 27–33. Yet another final for the Mako and they had a chance to make it a three peat when they met Waikato in the final in Hamilton, the side conceded 2 intercept tries and because of this lost 23–20.

=== Combined competition: 2022 to present ===
2022 was a season full of disappointment for the Mako with just 4 wins from 10 games, failing to make the playoffs for the first time in 11 years. The side was missing many key players with injury and All Blacks duties but still managed to drop many games they should have won. The best performance of the season came over Northland (52-17).

The Mako bounced back in 2023 as they made the quarter finals before losing to Taranaki, the most impressive wins came over Auckland (24-12), Manawatu (58-19) and Taranaki (18-29 in the regular season). Anton Segner had a stand out season and Alex Nankivell played his final season for the side after 81 appearances.

In 2024, Tasman reached the quarterfinals, where they lost 62–14 to Canterbury. The team began the season with seven consecutive wins, including a 25–24 victory over Hawke’s Bay, to win the Ranfurly Shield for the first time in the history of the union. The Mako retained the shield against Wellington and Auckland before losing it to Taranaki. Timoci Tavatavanawai beat 58 defenders and scored six tries in eight appearances before suffering an injury. William Havili scored 104 points, all from the kicking tee, while Ryan Coxon, Tim O’Malley and Sam Matenga each made their 50th appearances for the team. Tasman fielded eight debutants against Otago and also recorded wins over Manawatu, Counties Manukau, Bay of Plenty and Waikato.

The Mako had a disappointing season in 2025, despite many injuries and All Black selections of key players by the end of the season, Tasman were highly rated with a stacked team at the start of the season but were destroyed 37-7 by Bay of Plenty in Round 1, before bouncing back with strong wins over Manawatu (49-17), Northland (14-28) and North Harbour (19-43). The following game, after the sad passing of Tasman legend Shane Christie just days before, the Mako beat Otago 31-27 with an overtime try from a lineout drive, but following this lost 21-29 to Auckland, 31-25 to Canterbury in a Ranfurly Shield challenge which was arguably the best performance of the season from the Mako, and 24-29 to Waikato, the side played well at times during these games but failed to execute in key moments. A 38-55 win over Southland was Tasman's final win of the season before being beat 41-49 by Counties Manukau and again by Bay of Plenty (27-7) in the quarter finals. Tomasi Maka had a stand out season scoring 9 tries, while Fletcher Anderson also had a breakthrough season. Wingers Macca Springer and Kyren Taumoefolau scored 14 tries between them, while captain David Havili passed the clubs try scoring record of Mako legend Robbie Malneek, with Havili scoring his 26th to pass him in Round 9 against Southland. Leicester Fainga'anuku was also a stand out after returning from France before getting called up to join the All Blacks. Ethan Blackadder and Sione Havili Talitui both brought up 50 games during the season, in what was the final season in New Zealand for Havili Talitui along with veterans Quinten Strange and Levi Aumua.

=== Ranfurly Shield ===
Tasman had not held the Ranfurly Shield until Round 5 of the 2024 Bunnings NPC where they beat holders Hawke's Bay 24–25 at McLean Park in a famous overtime victory with Campbell Parata kicking a penalty goal from half way to win. The Mako successfully defended the shield against Wellington and Auckland, before losing it to Taranaki in Round 9. Marlborough held the shield for six challenges in 1973.

Other than their first and only time winning the shield in 2024 Tasman have been involved in six Ranfurly Shield challenges since the union's inception in 2006. Tasman lost their first challenge 26–20 to Wellington in 2008, and their second challenge 49–40 to Taranaki in 2012. Their third challenge was against Hawke's Bay in 2021, where they were defeated 34–22. They had another challenge in 2023, a 7–0 loss to Wellington. Their most recent challenges were a 31–25 loss to Canterbury, a thriller in Christchurch during the 2025 season and a loss to the Northland Taniwha 20–10 in 2026.

== Records and statistics ==
=== Season standings ===
The following is a summary of every season for the Tasman Mako since 2006.

Year	Position	Played	Won	Drawn	Lost	Points	Captain	Head Coach	Finals
2006	12th	9	2	0	7	13	Tiʻi Paulo	Dennis Brown	
2007	11th	10	2	0	8	12	Alex Ainley	Dennis Brown	
2008	7th	11	4	1	6	23	Ben Franks	Todd Blackadder	Lost to Canterbury in quarterfinal
2009	9th	13	6	0	7	28	Andrew Goodman	Kieran Keane	
2010	12th	13	4	0	9	20	Chris Jack	Kieran Keane	
2011	7th	10	2	0	8	13	Andrew Goodman	Kieran Keane	
2012	3rd	11	5	0	6	24	Andrew Goodman	Kieran Keane	Lost to Otago in semifinal
2013	1st	12	10	0	2	36	Shane Christie	Kieran Keane	Beat Hawke's Bay in final, promoted to Premiership
2014	2nd	12	8	1	3	38	Shane Christie	Kieran Keane	Lost to Taranaki in final
2015	3rd	11	7	0	4	35	Shane Christie	Kieran Keane	Lost to Auckland in semifinal
2016	2nd	12	8	1	3	34	Shane Christie	Leon MacDonald	Lost to Canterbury in final
2017	2nd	12	7	0	5	31	Alex Ainley	Leon MacDonald	Lost to Canterbury in final
2018	3rd	11	9	0	2	43	David Havili	Leon MacDonald	Lost to Canterbury in semifinal
2019	1st	12	12	0	0	48	David Havili	Andrew Goodman	Beat Wellington in final
2020	1st	12	9	0	3	33	David Havili	Andrew Goodman	Beat Auckland in final
2021	2nd	11	7	0	4	28	Mitchell Hunt and Quinten Strange	Andrew Goodman	Lost to Waikato in final
2022	5th (Note: There was no Premiership or Championship conference in 2022, due to the COVID-19 pandemic effecting the 2021 season. An Odds and Evens conference was created instead, with Tasman placed in the Evens Conference.)	10	4	0	6	24	Quinten Strange	Gray Cornelius and Dan Perrin	
2023	7th	11	6	0	5	31	Quinten Strange	Gray Cornelius and Dan Perrin	Lost to Taranaki in quarter final
2024	6th	11	8	0	3	38	Quinten Strange	Gray Cornelius	Lost to Canterbury in quarter final
2025	6th	11	5	0	6	30	David Havili	Gray Cornelius	Lost to Bay of Plenty in quarter final
2026	7th	11	6	0	5	32	Johnny Lee	Jono Phillips	Lost to Northland in quarter final

Key:
Blue bar denotes Championship division
Green fill denotes Cup winner

=== Centurions ===
Players that have played 100 or more games for the Tasman Mako since their inception in 2006.

- # Represents the players 'Tasman Mako cap number'.

#	Player	Debut	Caps
15	Robbie Malneek	2006	104
19	Alex Ainley	2006	100
48	Quentin MacDonald	2007	126

Source: New Zealand Rugby History

=== 50 or more ===
Players that have played 50 or more games for the Tasman Mako since their inception in 2006.

- # Represents the players 'Tasman Mako cap number'.

#	Player	Debut	Caps
6	Mark Bright	2006	52
7	Jonathan Poff	2006	61
15	Robbie Malneek	2006	104
19	Alex Ainley	2006	100
33	Andrew Goodman	2007	55
48	Quentin MacDonald	2007	126
60	Joe Wheeler	2008	80
81	Vernon Fredericks	2010	56
82	Shane Christie	2010	73
90	Kieron Fonotia	2011	72
104	Tim Perry	2012	70
113	Billy Guyton	2013	52
118	David Havili	2014	90
128	Alex Nankivell	2015	81
138	Finlay Christie	2016	61
140	Mitchell Hunt	2016	68
141	Andrew Makalio	2016	65
143	Quinten Strange	2016	85
79	Tom Marshall	2010	52
153	Levi Aumua	2017	74
164	Ryan Coxon	2017	73
152	Tim O'Malley	2016	50
188	Sam Matenga	2019	60
146	Ethan Blackadder	2016	50
174	Sione Havili Talitui	2018	52
205	Macca Springer	2021	50

Source: New Zealand Rugby History

=== Top points scorers ===
#	Player	Club	Points
1	Marty Banks	Waimea	628
2	Mitchell Hunt	Stoke	562
3	William Havili	Kahurangi	304
4	Andrew Goodman	Nelson	291
5	David Havili	Nelson	199

Source: New Zealand Rugby History

=== Top try scorers ===
#	Player	Club	Tries
1	David Havili	Nelson	29
2	Macca Springer	Waimea	28
3	Kyren Taumoefolau	Waitohi	27
4	Robbie Malneek	Nelson	25
5	Leicester Fainga'anuku	Nelson	24

Source: New Zealand Rugby History

== Club rugby ==
There are 22 clubs in the Tasman Union.

- Awatere Rugby Club
- Buccaneers Rugby Club
- Central Rugby Club
- Collingwood Rugby Club
- Harlequins Rugby Club
- Huia Rugby Club
- Kahurangi Rugby Club
- Marist Rugby Club
- Motueka United Rugby Club
- Moutere Rugby Club
- Murchison Rugby Club
- Nelson Rugby Club
- Pelorus Rugby Club
- Rangers Rugby Club
- Renwick Rugby Club
- Riwaka Rugby Club
- Stoke Rugby Club
- Takaka Rugby Club
- Tapawera Rugby Club
- Waimea Old Boys Rugby Club
- Waitohi Rugby Club
- Wanderers Rugby Club

=== Club champions ===
==== Tasman Trophy ====
- 2026 Marist 31-22 Nelson
- 2025 Marist 43-17 Waimea Old Boys
- 2024 Kahurangi 20-12 Central
- 2023 Central 20-16 Marist
- 2022 Central 33-7 Kahurangi

==== Premier Women ====
- 2026 Kahurangi 46 Waimea 13
- 2025 Waimea 23 Kahurangi 22

== All Blacks ==
Players that have represented Tasman Mako in any fixture since their inception in 2006, and also played for the All Blacks.

- # Represents the players 'All Black cap number'.

#	Player	Debut	Caps
970	Caleb Ralph	1998	16
987	Greg Feek	1999	10
1003	Chris Jack	2001	68
1035	Brad Thorn	2003	60
1043	Rico Gear	2004	20
1046	Jimmy Cowan	2004	53
1056	Campbell Johnstone	2005	3
1084	Ben Franks	2008	48
1088	Isaac Ross	2009	8
1091	Wyatt Crockett	2009	72
1151	Liam Squire	2016	24
1152	Kane Hames	2016	10
1161	David Havili	2017	32
1162	Tim Perry	2017	8
1168	Atu Moli	2017	5
1169	Mitchell Drummond	2017	2
1172	Shannon Frizell	2018	35
1180	Tyrel Lomax	2018	56
1182	Sevu Reece	2019	37
1191	Will Jordan	2020	64
1195	Ethan Blackadder	2021	19
1196	Finlay Christie	2021	28
1200	Leicester Fainga'anuku	2022	13
1207	Mark Tele'a	2022	19
1216	Noah Hotham	2024	4
1228	Timoci Tavatavanawai	2025	7
1237	Anton Segner	2026	7
