= 2019 Mitre 10 Cup =

2019 rugby union competition in New Zealand

2019 Mitre 10 Cup season
- Countries: New Zealand
- Date: 8 August – 26 October
- Champions: Tasman
- Runners-up: Wellington
- Promoted: Bay of Plenty
- Relegated: Counties Manukau
- Matches played: 76
- Tries scored: 563 (average 7.4 per match)
- Top point scorer: Jackson Garden-Bachop (Wellington); 116 points
- Top try scorer: Josh McKay (Canterbury); 11 tries

Official website
- www.provincial.rugby

The 2019 Mitre 10 Cup season was the fourteenth season of New Zealand's provincial rugby union competition since it turned professional in 2006. The regular season began on August 8, when Southland hosted Northland. It involved the top fourteen rugby unions of New Zealand. For sponsorship reasons, the competition was known as the Mitre 10 Cup and it was the fourth season under the lead sponsor. The winner of the Championship, Bay of Plenty was promoted to the Premiership, the seventh placed Premiership team, Counties Manukau was relegated to the Championship.

== Format ==
The Mitre 10 Cup standings were sorted by a competition points system. Four points were awarded to the winning team, a draw equaled two points, whilst a loss amounted to zero points. Unions could also win their side a respectable bonus point. To receive a bonus point, they must have scored four tries or more or lose by seven or fewer points or less. Each team was placed on their total points received. If necessary of a tiebreaker, when two or more teams finish on equal points, the union who defeated the other in a head-to-head got placed higher. In case of a draw between them, the side with the biggest points differential margin got rights to be ranked above. If they were tied on points difference, it was then decided by a highest scored try count or a coin toss. This seeding format was implemented since the beginning of the 2006 competition.

The competition included a promotion-relegation process with the winner of the Championship receiving automatic promotion to the Premiership, replacing the seventh-placed team in the Premiership which was relegated to the Championship for the following year. The regular season consisted of two types of matches. The internal division matches were when each team played the other six unions in their division once, home or away. The cross-division matches were when each team played four teams from the other division, thus missing out on three teams, each from the opposite division. Each union played home or away games against teams from the other division, making a total of ten competition games for each union. The finals format allowed the top four teams from each division move on to the semi-finals. The top two division winners, based on table points, received a home semi-final. In the first round of the finals, the semi-finals, the second division winner hosted the third division winner, and the first division winner hosted the fourth division winner. The final was hosted by the top remaining seed.

== Standings ==
Source: Mitre 10 Cup standings 2019

Premiership Division
#	Team	GP	W	D	L	PF	PA	PD	TB	LB	PTS
1	Tasman	10	10	0	0	391	114	+277	8	0	48
2	Wellington	10	7	1	2	321	269	+52	7	0	37
3	RS – Canterbury	10	6	0	4	345	198	+147	8	3	35
4	Auckland	10	5	2	3	274	208	+66	5	0	29
5	North Harbour	10	4	1	5	271	265	+6	7	3	28
6	Waikato	10	3	1	6	276	317	–41	6	2	22
7	Counties Manukau	10	1	0	9	175	318	–143	4	3	11

Championship Division
#	Team	GP	W	D	L	PF	PA	PD	TB	LB	PTS
1	Bay of Plenty	10	8	0	2	341	160	+181	7	2	41
2	Hawke's Bay	10	7	1	2	307	261	+46	9	0	39
3	Otago	10	5	0	5	266	327	–61	5	0	25
4	Manawatu	10	4	0	6	199	317	–118	4	1	21
5	Taranaki	10	4	0	6	227	260	–33	2	0	18
6	Northland	10	2	0	8	225	393	–168	2	1	11
7	Southland	10	1	0	9	161	372	–211	2	1	7

=== Standings progression ===
Premiership
Team	W1	W2	W3	W4	W5	W6	W7	W8	W9	W10
Auckland	3 (3rd)	8 (2nd)	12 (2nd)	14 (2nd)	14 (3rd)	19 (3rd)	19 (4th)	19 (5th)	24 (5th)	29 (4th)
Canterbury	2 (5th)	2 (7th)	3 (7th)	8 (7th)	13 (6th)	18 (4th)	20 (3rd)	25 (3rd)	30 (3rd)	35 (3rd)
Counties Manukau	2 (6th)	7 (3rd)	9 (5th)	11 (5th)	11 (7th)	11 (7th)	11 (7th)	11 (7th)	11 (7th)	11 (7th)
North Harbour	3 (4th)	4 (5th)	9 (4th)	9 (6th)	14 (4th)	15 (6th)	16 (5th)	21 (4th)	26 (4th)	28 (5th)
Tasman	5 (1st)	9 (1st)	14 (1st)	19 (1st)	24 (1st)	28 (1st)	33 (1st)	38 (1st)	43 (1st)	48 (1st)
Waikato	5 (2nd)	5 (4th)	10 (3rd)	12 (3rd)	14 (5th)	16 (5th)	16 (6th)	17 (6th)	22 (6th)	22 (6th)
Wellington	0 (7th)	3 (6th)	7 (6th)	12 (4th)	16 (2nd)	21 (2nd)	26 (2nd)	31 (2nd)	32 (2nd)	37 (2nd)
Championship
Team	W1	W2	W3	W4	W5	W6	W7	W8	W9	W10
Bay of Plenty	5 (1st)	10 (1st)	11 (3rd)	15 (2nd)	16 (2nd)	21 (2nd)	26 (2nd)	31 (2nd)	36 (2nd)	41 (1st)
Hawke's Bay	5 (2nd)	8 (3rd)	13 (2nd)	18 (1st)	23 (1st)	28 (1st)	33 (1st)	34 (1st)	38 (1st)	39 (2nd)
Manawatu	0 (6th)	1 (6th)	1 (6th)	1 (6th)	6 (5th)	11 (5th)	16 (4th)	16 (5th)	16 (5th)	21 (4th)
Northland	4 (4th)	4 (5th)	4 (5th)	4 (5th)	5 (6th)	5 (6th)	5 (7th)	6 (7th)	6 (7th)	11 (6th)
Otago	0 (7th)	5 (4th)	5 (4th)	10 (4th)	15 (3rd)	16 (3rd)	20 (3rd)	25 (3rd)	25 (3rd)	25 (3rd)
Southland	0 (5th)	0 (7th)	0 (7th)	0 (7th)	0 (7th)	2 (7th)	7 (6th)	7 (6th)	7 (6th)	7 (7th)
Taranaki	5 (3rd)	9 (2nd)	14 (1st)	14 (3rd)	14 (4th)	14 (4th)	14 (5th)	18 (4th)	18 (4th)	18 (5th)
The table above shows a team's progression throughout the season. For each week, their cumulative points total is shown with the overall division log position in brackets.
Key:	Win	Draw	Loss	Bye						

== Regular season ==
The 2019 Mitre 10 Cup played across ten weeks. The competition started on 8 August, with Southland taking on Northland at Rugby Park Stadium in Invercargill.

=== Week 1 ===
8 August 2019
19:35 NZST

Southland	17–27	Northland
Try: Isaac Te Tamaki 26'; Phil Halder 37'; Josh Moorby 61'; Con: Marty McKenzie (1/3) 62'	Report	Try: Coree Te Whata-Colley 50'; Jordan Hyland 54'; Temo Mayanavanua 72'; Con: Jack Debreczeni (3/3) 51', 54', 72'; Pen: Jack Debreczeni (2/2) 24', 40'

Rugby Park Stadium, Invercargill
Referee: Nick Webster

9 August 2019
19:35 NZST

Auckland	28–28	North Harbour
Try: Tanielu Tele’a 5'; Hoskins Sotutu (2) 11', 40'; Penalty try 27'; Con: Harry Plummer (3/3) 6', 12', 40'; Pen: Harry Plummer (0/1)	Report	Try: Gerard Cowley-Tuioti 19'; Asaeli Tikoirotuma 33'; Karl Tu'inukuafe 52'; Lua Li 57'; Con: Jared Page (4/4) 20', 34', 53', 59'; Pen: Shaun Stevenson (0/1); Jared Page (0/1); Cards: Bryn Hall (yellow card) 27'

Eden Park, Auckland
Referee: Paul Williams

10 August 2019
14:35 NZST

Tasman	45–8	Wellington
Try: Liam Squire 4'; Andrew Makalio 13'; Tyrel Lomax 23'; David Havili 33'; Leicester Fainga'anuku (2) 48', 54'; Te Ahiwaru Cirikidaveta 74'; Con: Mitchell Hunt (5/7) 5', 25', 35', 56', 75'	Report	Try: Alex Fidow 53'; Con: Jackson Garden-Bachop (0/1); Pen: Jackson Garden-Bachop (1/2) 21'

Lansdowne Park, Blenheim
Referee: James Doleman

10 August 2019
17:05 NZST

Counties Manukau	29–34	Taranaki
Try: Chris Kuridrani 2'; Etene Nanai-Seturo 13'; Conán O'Donnell 24'; Daniel Hyatt 75'; Con: Riley Hohepa (2/3) 14', 25'; Andrew Kellaway (1/1) 76'; Pen: Riley Hohepa (1/1) 68'; Cards: Samuel Slade (yellow card) 19'	Report	Try: Sean Wainui 6'; Waisake Naholo 15'; Penalty try 19'; Lachlan Boshier 39'; Jackson Ormond 64'; Con: Daniel Waite (2/4) 7', 40'; Pen: Daniel Waite (1/1) 23'

Navigation Homes Stadium, Pukekohe
Attendance: 4,512
Referee: Angus Mabey

10 August 2019
19:35 NZST

Waikato	31–28	Canterbury
Try: Josh Iosefa-Scott 8'; Quinn Tupaea 20'; Hamilton Burr 52'; Valynce Crosby-Te Whare 68'; Con: Fletcher Smith (4/4) 9', 22', 53', 69'; Pen: Fletcher Smith (1/1) 42'	Report	Try: Josh McKay (2) 2', 23'; Luke Whitelock 28'; Sam Gilbert 57'; Con: Brett Cameron (4/4) 3', 24', 29', 57'; Cards: Tom Christie (yellow card) 67'

Waikato Stadium, Hamilton
Referee: Daniel Jones (Wales)

11 August 2019
14:05 NZST

Bay of Plenty	50–7	Otago
Try: Abraham Papalii 13'; Mitchell Karpik 20'; Fa'asiu Fuatai (2) 24', 74'; Aidan Ross 39'; Joe Webber 48'; Luke Campbell 66'; Jason Robertson 80'; Con: Dan Hollinshead (5/8) 14', 26', 40', 50', 67'	Report	Try: Sio Tomkinson 63'; Con: Vilimoni Koroi (1/1) 63'

Tauranga Domain, Tauranga
Referee: Frank Murphy (Ireland)

11 August 2019
16:45 NZST

Manawatu	13–31	Hawke's Bay
Try: Hamish Northcott 1'; Con: Otere Black (1/1) 2'; Pen: Sam Malcolm (1/1) 15'; Otere Black (1/1) 64'	Report	Try: Brendon O'Connor 11'; Ash Dixon (2) 37', 44'; Pouri Rakete-Stones 55'; Folau Fakatava 67'; Con: Lincoln McClutchie (0/2); Danny Toala (3/3) 45', 56', 68'; Pen: Danny Toala (0/1)

Arena Manawatu, Palmerston North
Referee: Cameron Stone

=== Week 2 ===
15 August 2019
19:35 NZST

Northland	10–43	Auckland
Try: Pisi Leilua 79'; Con: Jack Debreczeni (1/1) 80'; Pen: Jack Debreczeni (1/1) 3'	Report	Try: Jack Whetton 10'; Caleb Clarke 14'; Jamie Lane 19'; AJ Lam 41'; Tanielu Tele’a 66'; TJ Faiane 77'; Con: D'Angelo Leuila (4/4) 12', 16', 20', 42'; Daniel Kirkpatrick (1/2) 77'; Pen: D'Angelo Leuila (1/1) 39'

Okara Park, Whangārei
Referee: Mike Fraser

16 August 2019
17:45 NZST

North Harbour	25–39	Counties Manukau
Try: Matt Duffie (2) 13', 43'; Mark Tele'a 33'; Lotu Inisi 65'; Con: Jared Page (1/4) 13'; Pen: Jared Page (1/1) 40'	Report	Try: Conán O'Donnell 7'; Kali Hala 20'; Chris Kuridrani (2) 24', 56'; Penalty try 75'; Con: Riley Hohepa (3/4) 8', 26', 57'; Pen: Riley Hohepa (2/2) 29', 70'

North Harbour Stadium, Albany
Referee: Ben O'Keeffe

16 August 2019
19:35 NZST

Hawke's Bay	27–27	Wellington
Try: Brendon O'Connor 4'; Tom Parsons 27'; Danny Toala 51'; Caleb Makene 76'; Con: Lincoln McClutchie (2/4) 28', 52'; Pen: Lincoln McClutchie (1/1) 80'	Report	Try: Teariki Ben-Nicholas 15'; Vince Aso 18'; Kemara Hauiti-Parapara 31'; Xavier Numia 41'; Con: Jackson Garden-Bachop (2/4) 19', 42'; Pen: Jackson Garden-Bachop (1/1) 74'

McLean Park, Napier
Referee: Frank Murphy (Ireland)

17 August 2019
14:05 NZST

Manawatu	10–13	Taranaki
Try: Ben Werthmuller 19'; Jamie Booth 25'; Con: Otere Black (0/2); Pen: Ben Wyness (0/1)	Report	Try: Penalty try 12'; Pen: Daniel Waite (2/2) 39', 56'; Jayson Potroz (0/1)

Arena Manawatu, Palmerston North
Referee: Daniel Jones (Wales)

17 August 2019
16:35 NZST

RS – Otago	41–22	Southland
Try: Jona Nareki (2) 4', 51'; Slade McDowall 40'; Dylan Nel 47'; Joshua Dickson 55'; Rowan Gouws 69'; Con: Vilimoni Koroi (4/6) 5', 40', 48', 56'; Pen: Vilimoni Koroi (1/1) 13'	Report	Try: Josh Moorby 49'; Charles Alaimalo 63'; Bill Fukofuka 78'; Con: Marty McKenzie (2/3) 50', 64'; Pen: Marty McKenzie (1/2) 23'

Forsyth Barr Stadium, Dunedin
Referee: Paul Williams

18 August 2019
14:05 NZST

Canterbury	8–23	Tasman
Try: Josh McKay 41'; Con: Brett Cameron (0/1); Pen: Brett Cameron (1/1) 11'	Report	Try: Levi Aumua 4'; Leicester Fainga'anuku 15'; Shannon Frizell 45'; Con: Mitchell Hunt (1/3) 6'; Pen: Mitchell Hunt (2/2) 13', 32'

Rugby League Park, Christchurch
Referee: Nick Briant

18 August 2019
16:35 NZST

Bay of Plenty	40–14	Waikato
Try: Richard Judd 12'; Ross Geldenhuys 23'; Joe Ravouvou 30'; Emoni Narawa 48'; Chase Tiatia 78'; Con: Dan Hollinshead (3/5) 13', 24', 49'; Pen: Dan Hollinshead (3/3) 28', 63', 75'	Report	Try: Quinn Tupaea (2) 7', 37'; Con: Fletcher Smith (2/2) 9', 39'

Rotorua International Stadium, Rotorua
Referee: Daniel Waenga

=== Week 3 ===
22 August 2019
19:35 NZST

Hawke's Bay	29–21	Otago
Try: Ash Dixon 9'; Tom Parsons 25'; Danny Toala 43'; Brad Weber 57'; Con: Lincoln McClutchie (2/3) 10', 44'; Danny Toala (1/1) 26'; Pen: Danny Toala (1/1) 30'; Lincoln McClutchie (0/1); Cards: Lincoln McClutchie (yellow card) 22'	Report	Try: Jona Nareki 15'; Josh Ioane 68'; Michael Collins 72'; Con: Josh Ioane (3/3) 16', 69', 73'; Cards: Jona Nareki (yellow card) 57'

McLean Park, Napier
Referee: Mike Fraser

23 August 2019
19:35 NZST

Wellington	23–22	Canterbury
Try: Vince Aso 37'; Du'Plessis Kirifi 44'; Alex Fidow 48'; Con: Jackson Garden-Bachop (1/3) 44'; Pen: Jackson Garden-Bachop (2/3) 16', 57'	Report	Try: Josh McKay 25'; Mitchell Dunshea 66'; Oliver Jager 75'; Con: Brett Cameron (2/3) 26', 76'; Pen: Brett Cameron (1/1) 4'

Wellington Regional Stadium, Wellington
Referee: Ben O'Keeffe

24 August 2019
14:35 NZST

Tasman	64–3	Manawatu
Try: Liam Squire 3'; Hugh Roach 22'; Jordan Taufua 29'; Finlay Christie 35'; Jamie Spowart (3) 37', 73', 76'; Jacob Norris 55'; Will Jordan 63'; Ethan Blackadder 67'; Con: Mitchell Hunt (4/5) 4', 23', 36', 38'; Tim O'Malley (3/5) 56', 67', 77'	Report	Pen: Otere Black (1/1) 18'

Lansdowne Park, Blenheim
Referee: Nick Hogan

24 August 2019
17:05 NZST

Auckland	19–13	Bay of Plenty
Try: Salesi Rayasi (2) 6', 17'; Rieko Ioane 25'; Con: D'Angelo Leuila (2/3) 18', 26'; Pen: D'Angelo Leuila (0/1); Cards: Hoskins Sotutu (yellow card) 73'	Report	Try: Mitchell Karpik 1'; Con: Dan Hollinshead (1/1) 2'; Pen: Dan Hollinshead (2/2) 61', 78'; Cards: Chase Tiatia (yellow card) 47'

Eden Park, Auckland
Referee: Brendon Pickerill

24 August 2019
19:35 NZST

Counties Manukau	26–31	Waikato
Try: Kali Hala 22'; Sam Henwood 60'; Riley Hohepa 71'; Donald Maka 77'; Con: Riley Hohepa (3/4) 22', 62', 78'	Report	Try: Declan O'Donnell 2'; Bailyn Sullivan 24'; Newton Tudreu 27'; Hamilton Burr 47'; Con: Fletcher Smith (4/4) 3', 25', 29', 48'; Pen: Fletcher Smith (1/1) 59'

Navigation Homes Stadium, Pukekohe
Referee: Nick Briant

25 August 2019
14:05 NZST

Taranaki	52–19	Northland
Try: Sean Wainui (2) 27', 59'; Te Toiroa Tahuriorangi 29'; Jackson Ormond (2) 40', 61'; Tupou Vaa'i 45'; Daniel Waite 47'; Jayson Potroz 70'; Con: Daniel Waite (6/8) 28', 30', 46', 60', 62', 71'	Report	Try: Ross Wright 5'; Renata Roberts-Te Nana 75'; Coree Te Whata-Colley 80'; Con: Jack Debreczeni (2/3) 6', 80'

Yarrow Stadium, New Plymouth
Attendance: 3,600
Referee: Paul Williams

25 August 2019
16:35 NZST

Southland	12–33	North Harbour
Try: Marty McKenzie 10'; Scott Eade 55'; Con: Marty McKenzie (1/1) 11'; Scott Eade (0/1); Pen: Scott Eade (0/1); Cards: Joe Walsh (yellow card) 52'	Report	Try: James Little 25'; Asaeli Tikoirotuma 41'; Bryn Hall 46'; Harrison Groundwater 67'; Matt Duffie 71'; Con: Matt McGahan (4/5) 25', 47', 68', 73'

Rugby Park Stadium, Invercargill
Referee: James Munro

=== Week 4 ===
29 August 2019
19:35 NZST

Wellington	29–22	Counties Manukau
Try: Wes Goosen 24'; James Blackwell 47'; Billy Proctor 76'; Du'Plessis Kirifi 80'; Con: Jackson Garden-Bachop (3/4) 25', 77', 80'; Pen: Jackson Garden-Bachop (1/1) 62'	Report	Try: Sikeli Nabou 4'; Kali Hala 26'; Orbyn Leger 44'; Malgene Ilaua 53'; Con: Riley Hohepa (1/4) 5'; Cards: Sean Bagshaw (yellow card) 40'; Donald Maka (yellow card) 75'

Wellington Regional Stadium, Wellington
Referee: Nick Webster

30 August 2019
19:35 NZST

RS – Otago	37–20	Manawatu
Try: Vilimoni Koroi (3) 1', 38', 61'; Jona Nareki 23'; Sio Tomkinson 73'; Con: Josh Ioane (3/5) 2', 39', 75'; Pen: Josh Ioane (2/3) 33', 70'	Report	Try: Jamie Booth 5'; Adam Boult 10'; Con: Otere Black (2/2) 6', 12'; Pen: Sam Malcolm (0/1); Otere Black (2/3) 36', 50'

Forsyth Barr Stadium, Dunedin
Attendance: 3,000
Referee: Glen Jackson

31 August 2019
14:35 NZST

Canterbury	80–0	Southland
Try: Tom Christie 11'; Mitchell Drummond (2) 16', 50'; Luke Romano 25'; Ryan Crotty (2) 27', 31'; Fergus Burke 42'; Josh McKay (2) 57', 68'; Mitchell Dunshea 62'; Dallas McLeod 71'; Luke Whitelock 80'; Con: Fergus Burke (4/6) 12', 17', 26', 32'; Brett Cameron (6/6) 51', 58', 63', 69', 72', 80'	Report

Rugby League Park, Christchurch
Referee: Daniel Waenga

31 August 2019
17:05 NZST

Northland	28–43	Hawke's Bay
Try: Temo Mayanavanua 3'; Jack Straker 21'; Jaycob Matiu 43'; Con: Jack Debreczeni (2/3) 22', 43'; Pen: Jack Debreczeni (3/4) 8', 56', 59'; Cards: Isileli Tu'ungafasi (yellow card) 48'	Report	Try: Ash Dixon 13'; Neria Fomai (3) 25', 40', 64'; Caleb Makene (2) 33', 52'; Folau Fakatava 75'; Con: Lincoln McClutchie (0/1); Danny Toala (4/6) 40', 53', 66', 76'; Cards: Isaia Walker-Leawere (yellow card) 80'

Okara Park, Whangārei
Referee: Michael Winter

31 August 2019
19:35 NZST

Waikato	20–20	Auckland
Try: Ollie Norris 4'; Declan O'Donnell 12'; Con: Fletcher Smith (2/2) 5', 13'; Pen: Fletcher Smith (2/3) 59', 62'; Cards: James Tucker (yellow card) 35'	Report	Try: Caleb Clarke 37'; Leni Apisai 65'; Con: D'Angelo Leuila (1/1) 38'; Daniel Kirkpatrick (1/1) 66'; Pen: D'Angelo Leuila (1/1) 9'; Daniel Kirkpatrick (1/1) 73'

Waikato Stadium, Hamilton
Referee: Richard Kelly

1 September 2019
14:05 NZST

North Harbour	19–27	Bay of Plenty
Try: Lotu Inisi 8'; Shaun Stevenson 15'; James Little 67'; Con: Matt McGahan (2/2) 9', 16'; Jared Page (0/1); Pen: Matt McGahan (0/1)	Report	Try: Mitchell Karpik 2'; Joe Webber 20'; Alex Ainley 40'; Con: Dan Hollinshead (3/3) 3', 21', 40'; Pen: Dan Hollinshead (2/4) 49', 80'; Cards: Mitchell Karpik (yellow card) 64'

North Harbour Stadium, Albany
Referee: Nick Hogan

1 September 2019
16:35 NZST

Taranaki	18–28	Tasman
Try: Lachlan Boshier 41'; Waisake Naholo 64'; Con: Daniel Waite (1/2) 43'; Pen: Daniel Waite (2/2) 10', 15'	Report	Try: Tima Fainga'anuku (2) 5', 40'; Andrew Makalio 37'; Finlay Christie 54'; Con: Mitchell Hunt (1/4) 55'; Pen: Mitchell Hunt (2/2) 21', 47'

Yarrow Stadium, New Plymouth
Referee: Angus Mabey

=== Week 5 ===
5 September 2019
19:35 NZST

Manawatu	31–25	Northland
Try: Andre Taylor (2) 7', 65'; Johnny Galloway 34'; Jamie Booth 40'; Con: Otere Black (4/4) 8', 35', 40', 66'; Pen: Otere Black (1/2) 21'	Report	Try: Sam Nock 25'; Ross Wright 49'; Scott Gregory 72'; Con: Jack Debreczeni (2/3) 26', 50'; Pen: Jack Debreczeni (2/2) 30', 54'

Arena Manawatu, Palmerston North
Referee: Glen Jackson

6 September 2019
17:45 NZST

Hawke's Bay	41–23	Southland
Try: Gareth Evans 12'; Ash Dixon (2) 25', 38'; Danny Toala 57'; Brendon O'Connor 66'; Lincoln McClutchie 70'; Jason Long 77'; Con: Danny Toala (2/6) 39', 58'; Lincoln McClutchie (1/1) 78'	Report	Try: Isaac Te Tamaki (2) 42', 80'; Josh Moorby 74'; Con: Marty McKenzie (1/3) 42'; Pen: Marty McKenzie (2/2) 17', 19'; Cards: Morgan Mitchell (yellow card) 66'

McLean Park, Napier
Referee: Rebecca Mahoney

6 September 2019
19:45 NZST

Counties Manukau	0–36	Tasman
Cards: Sikeli Nabou (yellow card) 69'	Report	Try: Will Jordan (2) 10', 20'; Levi Aumua 31'; Sam Moli 46'; Leicester Fainga'anuku 70'; Con: Mitchell Hunt (3/3) 12', 20', 33'; Tim O'Malley (1/2) 71'; Pen: Mitchell Hunt (1/1) 27'

Navigation Homes Stadium, Pukekohe
Referee: Michael Winter

7 September 2019
17:05 NZST

North Harbour	38–36	Waikato
Try: Mark Tele'a (2) 1', 14'; Murphy Taramai 52'; Luteru Tolai 68'; James Little 74'; Matt McGahan 80'; Con: Matt McGahan (4/6) 15', 53', 75', 80'	Report	Try: Bailyn Sullivan 6'; Samisoni Taukei'aho (2) 22', 38'; Quinn Tupaea 46'; Fletcher Smith 55'; Con: Fletcher Smith (4/5) 7', 23', 40', 48'; Pen: Fletcher Smith (1/2) 62'

North Harbour Stadium, Albany
Referee: James Doleman

7 September 2019
19:35 NZST

Bay of Plenty	15–16	Wellington
Try: Richard Judd 24'; Emoni Narawa 66'; Con: Dan Hollinshead (1/2) 25'; Pen: Dan Hollinshead (1/2) 2'	Report	Try: Peter Umaga-Jensen 56'; Con: Jackson Garden-Bachop (1/1) 57'; Pen: Jackson Garden-Bachop (3/3) 4', 27', 31'

Rotorua International Stadium, Rotorua
Referee: Tim Griffiths

8 September 2019
14:05 NZST

Auckland	22–32	Canterbury
Try: Akira Ioane 18'; Blake Gibson 59'; Salesi Rayasi 60'; Con: Harry Plummer (2/3) 18', 59'; Pen: Harry Plummer (1/1) 33'	Report	Try: Billy Harmon (2) 4', 50'; Dallas McLeod 39'; Ere Enari 67'; Con: Brett Cameron (2/3) 5', 40'; Fergus Burke (1/1) 68'; Pen: Brett Cameron (2/2) 3', 24'; Cards: Billy Harmon (yellow card) 11'

Eden Park, Auckland
Referee: Nick Hogan

8 September 2019
16:35 NZST

RS – Otago	35–27	Taranaki
Try: Aleki Morris-Lome 2'; Jona Nareki (2) 40', 64'; Vilimoni Koroi 41'; Con: Vilimoni Koroi (3/4) 3', 40', 42'; Pen: Vilimoni Koroi (3/3) 23', 59', 68'	Report	Try: Mitchell Brown 36'; Stephen Perofeta 46'; Teihorangi Walden 51'; Con: Daniel Waite (3/3) 37', 47', 52'; Pen: Daniel Waite (2/3) 8', 15'

Forsyth Barr Stadium, Dunedin
Referee: Nick Briant

=== Week 6 ===
12 September 2019
19:35 NZST

Waikato	24–27	Hawke's Bay
Try: Solomon Alaimalo 20'; Quinn Tupaea (2) 39', 42'; Simon Parker 72'; Con: Rivez Reihana (2/2) 21', 40'; Fletcher Smith (0/2); Cards: Antonio Shalfoon (yellow card) 60'	Report	Try: Lincoln McClutchie 2'; Folau Fakatava 50'; Pouri Rakete-Stones 60'; Mason Emerson 65'; Con: Lincoln McClutchie (2/4) 3', 51'; Pen: Lincoln McClutchie (1/1) 17'; Cards: Mason Emerson (yellow card) 39'

Waikato Stadium, Hamilton
Referee: Nick Briant

13 September 2019
19:35 NZST

Northland	12–42	Canterbury
Try: Sean Sweetman 6'; Jack Debreczeni 62'; Con: Jack Debreczeni (1/2) 7'	Report	Try: Sam Gilbert 2'; Brodie McAlister 30'; Josh McKay 34'; Whetu Douglas 44'; Fergus Burke 67'; Cullen Grace 76'; Con: Brett Cameron (3/6) 3', 34', 68'; Pen: Brett Cameron (2/4) 19', 50'

Okara Park, Whangārei
Referee: Tipene Cottrell

14 September 2019
14:35 NZST

Taranaki	17–31	Bay of Plenty
Try: Jayson Potroz 3'; Teihorangi Walden 55'; Con: Daniel Waite (2/2) 4', 57'; Pen: Daniel Waite (1/4) 29'	Report	Try: Chase Tiatia 21'; Emoni Narawa 35'; Dan Hollinshead 40'; Fa'asiu Fuatai 49'; Joe Ravouvou 77'; Con: Dan Hollinshead (2/4) 22', 50'; Jason Robertson (1/1) 78'; Pen: Dan Hollinshead (0/1); Jason Robertson (0/1)

Yarrow Stadium, New Plymouth
Referee: James Doleman

14 September 2019
17:05 NZST

Southland	26–31	Manawatu
Try: Greg Pleasants-Tate 5'; Lewis Ormond 15'; Logan Crowley 25'; Raymond Nu'u 29'; Con: Marty McKenzie (3/4) 5', 26', 30'	Report	Try: Brayden Iose 21'; Ngani Laumape (2) 46', 54'; Rhys Pedersen 65'; Con: Otere Black (4/4) 22', 47', 55', 66'; Pen: Otere Black (1/2) 73'

Rugby Park Stadium, Invercargill
Referee: Angus Mabey

14 September 2019
19:35 NZST

Counties Manukau	13–28	Auckland
Try: Joe Royal 55'; Sikeli Nabou 70'; Con: Orbyn Leger (0/1); Andrew Kellaway (0/1); Pen: Orbyn Leger (1/1) 6'	Report	Try: Blake Gibson 32'; Caleb Clarke 43'; Harry Plummer 74'; Salesi Rayasi 78'; Con: Harry Plummer (3/3) 34', 44', 75'; Daniel Kirkpatrick (1/1) 80'; Cards: Akira Ioane (yellow card) 13'; Tumua Manu (yellow card) 46'; Jonathan Ruru (yellow card) 66'

Navigation Homes Stadium, Pukekohe
Referee: Tim Griffiths

15 September 2019
14:05 NZST

Wellington	54–24	Otago
Try: Wes Goosen (3) 1', 51', 64'; Alex Fidow (2) 5', 18'; Peter Umaga-Jensen 28'; Kemara Hauiti-Parapara 38'; Ben Lam 47'; Con: Trent Renata (7/8) 1', 6', 19', 29', 39', 52', 65'	Report	Try: Henry Purdy 15'; Michael Collins 54'; Aleki Morris-Lome 72'; Mikaele Mafi 80'; Con: Josh Ioane (2/4) 73', 80'

Wellington Regional Stadium, Wellington
Referee: Daniel Waenga

15 September 2019
16:35 NZST

Tasman	21–17	North Harbour
Try: Finlay Christie 10'; Sione Havili 56'; Penalty try 77'; Con: Tim O'Malley (2/2) 11', 56'; Cards: Levi Aumua (yellow card) 31'	Report	Try: James Parsons 6'; Penalty try 29'; Con: Matt McGahan (1/1) 7'; Pen: Matt McGahan (1/1) 36'; Cards: Ropate Rinakama (yellow card) 77'

Trafalgar Park, Nelson
Referee: Richard Kelly

=== Week 7 ===
19 September 2019
19:35 NZST

Canterbury	29–32	Manawatu
Try: Dallas McLeod 32'; Luke Romano 49'; Sebastian Siataga 55'; Josh McKay 69'; Brett Cameron 78'; Con: Fergus Burke (0/2); Brett Cameron (2/3) 55', 70'	Report	Try: Johnny Galloway 16'; Andre Taylor 29'; Ngani Laumape 34'; Brayden Iose 59'; Con: Otere Black (3/4) 17', 30', 60'; Pen: Otere Black (1/1) 23'; Andre Taylor (1/1) 27'

Rugby League Park, Christchurch
Referee: Richard Kelly

20 September 2019
19:35 NZST

Hawke's Bay	35–17	Taranaki
Try: Mason Emerson (2) 1', 11'; Danny Toala (2) 21', 49'; Penalty try 47'; Con: Lincoln McClutchie (4/4) 2', 12', 22', 50'	Report	Try: Jayson Potroz 9'; Heiden Bedwell-Curtis 62'; Con: Jayson Potroz (1/1) 10'; Stephen Perofeta (1/1) 62'; Pen: Stephen Perofeta (1/1) 41'; Cards: Leighton Price (yellow card) 45'; Heiden Bedwell-Curtis (yellow card) 47'

McLean Park, Napier
Referee: Nick Hogan

21 September 2019
14:35 NZST

Waikato	26–35	Tasman
Try: Bailyn Sullivan (2) 8', 13'; Declan O'Donnell 29'; Con: Dwayne Sweeney (1/1) 9'; Fletcher Smith (0/2); Pen: Fletcher Smith (3/3) 34', 40', 68'	Report	Try: Hugh Roach 23'; David Havili 36'; Ethan Blackadder 54'; Wyatt Crockett 73'; Con: Tim O'Malley (1/2) 37'; David Havili (2/2) 56', 73'; Pen: Tim O'Malley (1/1) 2'; David Havili (2/3) 59', 78'

Waikato Stadium, Hamilton
Referee: Tipene Cottrell

21 September 2019
17:05 NZST

Southland	42–14	Counties Manukau
Try: Rory van Vugt 19'; Logan Crowley 27'; Greg Pleasants-Tate 43'; Isaac Te Tamaki 56'; Lewis Ormond 68'; Con: Marty McKenzie (4/5) 28', 44', 57', 70'; Pen: Marty McKenzie (3/4) 9', 32', 78'; Cards: Lewis Ormond (yellow card) 80'	Report	Try: Nikolai Foliaki 24'; Malgene Ilaua 72'; Con: Riley Hohepa (1/1) 25'; Orbyn Leger (1/1) 73'; Cards: Sikeli Nabou (yellow card) 19'

Rugby Park Stadium, Invercargill
Referee: Nick Webster

21 September 2019
19:35 NZST

North Harbour	15–21	Otago
Try: Matt Duffie 36'; Bryn Hall 43'; Con: Matt McGahan (1/2) 38'; Pen: Matt McGahan (1/2) 79'; Cards: Gerard Cowley-Tuioti (yellow card) 56'	Report	Try: James Lentjes 6'; Sio Tomkinson 40'; Aleki Morris-Lome 46'; Con: Josh Ioane (3/3) 8', 40', 48'; Cards: Michael Collins (yellow card) 40'

North Harbour Stadium, Albany
Referee: James Munro

22 September 2019
14:05 NZST

Auckland	15–34	Wellington
Try: Leni Apisai 13'; Jonathan Ruru 30'; Con: Harry Plummer (1/2) 14'; Pen: Harry Plummer (1/1) 39'	Report	Try: Peter Umaga-Jensen 1'; Billy Proctor (2) 27', 73'; Mateaki Kafatolu 46'; Con: Jackson Garden-Bachop (4/4) 1', 29', 48', 74'; Pen: Jackson Garden-Bachop (2/2) 42', 56'

Eden Park, Auckland
Referee: James Doleman

22 September 2019
16:35 NZST

Northland	22–46	Bay of Plenty
Try: Renata Roberts-Te Nana 28'; Sam Nock 53'; Harrison Levien 77'; Con: Jack Debreczeni (1/2) 29'; Thomas Smith (1/1) 78'; Pen: Jack Debreczeni (1/1) 8'	Report	Try: Hugh Blake 11'; Mathew Skipwith-Garland (2) 19', 61'; Fa'asiu Fuatai 22'; Cole Forbes 47'; Chase Tiatia 50'; Emoni Narawa 58'; Con: Kaleb Trask (4/7) 20', 23', 51', 63'; Pen: Kaleb Trask (1/1) 5'; Cards: Fa'asiu Fuatai (red card) 54'

Okara Park, Whangārei
Referee: Cameron Stone

=== Week 8 ===
26 September 2019
19:35 NZST

Taranaki	19–0	Southland
Try: Teihorangi Walden 46'; Jackson Ormond 66'; Waisake Naholo 74'; Con: Stephen Perofeta (2/3) 67', 75'	Report	Pen: Marty McKenzie (0/1)

Yarrow Stadium, New Plymouth
Referee: Daniel Waenga

27 September 2019
19:35 NZST

Tasman	40–0	Auckland
Try: Andrew Makalio 3'; Ethan Blackadder 7'; Leicester Fainga'anuku 34'; Finlay Christie 47'; Sione Havili 57'; Hugh Roach 69'; Con: Mitchell Hunt (5/6) 5', 8', 48', 58', 70'; Cards: Wyatt Crockett (yellow card) 24'	Report

Trafalgar Park, Nelson
Referee: James Munro

28 September 2019
14:35 NZST

Bay of Plenty	51–24	Hawke's Bay
Try: Joe Ravouvou (2) 2', 7'; Kaleb Trask 11'; Chase Tiatia (3) 29', 48', 72'; Mitchell Karpik 33'; Tevita Mafileo 79'; Con: Kaleb Trask (4/8) 3', 8', 31', 80'; Pen: Kaleb Trask (1/1) 69'; Cards: Emoni Narawa (yellow card) 66'	Report	Try: Danny Toala 46'; Geoffrey Cridge 54'; Ollie Sapsford 58'; Marino Mikaele-Tu'u 66'; Con: Lincoln McClutchie (2/4) 55', 67'

Tauranga Domain, Tauranga
Referee: James Doleman

28 September 2019
17:05 NZST

Wellington	57–36	Northland
Try: Vince Aso 19'; Du'Plessis Kirifi (2) 22', 39'; Thomas Umaga-Jensen 50'; Wes Goosen 55'; Joshua Furno 63'; Pepesana Patafilo (2) 69', 72'; Con: Jackson Garden-Bachop (7/8) 24', 40', 50', 56', 64', 70', 73'; Pen: Jackson Garden-Bachop (1/1) 14'	Report	Try: Paddy-Joe Atkins 11'; Aorangi Stokes (2) 27', 61'; Jonty Rae 67'; Jack Debreczeni 78'; Con: Jack Debreczeni (4/5) 28', 62', 68', 79'; Pen: Jack Debreczeni (1/1) 36'

Wellington Regional Stadium, Wellington
Referee: Glen Jackson

28 September 2019
19:35 NZST

Canterbury	38–5	Counties Manukau
Try: Brodie McAlister 10'; Mitchell Drummond (2) 27', 38'; Dallas McLeod 49'; Sam Gilbert (2) 56', 65'; Con: Brett Cameron (4/6) 10', 28', 50', 57'	Report	Try: Chris Kuridrani 77'; Con: Riley Hohepa (0/1); Cards: Nathaniel Apa (yellow card) 55'

Rugby League Park, Christchurch
Referee: Nick Hogan

29 September 2019
14:05 NZST

RS – Otago	45–35	Waikato
Try: Slade McDowall 8'; Vilimoni Koroi (2) 12', 58'; Jona Nareki 29'; Aleki Morris-Lome 42'; Henry Purdy 65'; Con: Josh Ioane (3/6) 31', 43', 66'; Pen: Josh Ioane (3/3) 24', 50', 73'	Report	Try: Simon Parker 33'; Penalty try 40'; Samisoni Taukei'aho (2) 45', 70'; Mitch Jacobson 76'; Con: Fletcher Smith (4/4) 34', 46', 71', 78'; Cards: Fletcher Smith (yellow card) 51'

Forsyth Barr Stadium, Dunedin
Referee: Richard Kelly

29 September 2019
16:35 NZST

Manawatu	16–29	North Harbour
Try: Adam Boult 3'; Otere Black 65'; Con: Otere Black (0/2); Pen: Otere Black (2/2) 26', 33'	Report	Try: Asaeli Tikoirotuma 14'; Sione Mafileo 18'; Matt Duffie 40'; Mark Tele'a 59'; Fine Inisi 76'; Con: Matt McGahan (2/5) 15', 41'; Pen: Matt McGahan (0/1)

Arena Manawatu, Palmerston North
Referee: Hugh Reed

=== Week 9 ===
3 October 2019
19:35 NZST

Counties Manukau	10–22	Hawke's Bay
Try: Jonathan Kawau 78'; Con: Orbyn Leger (1/1) 78'; Pen: Orbyn Leger (1/1) 31'	Report	Try: Tom Parsons 19'; Ash Dixon 27'; Folau Fakatava 66'; Con: Lincoln McClutchie (1/2) 28'; Tiaan Falcon (1/1) 67'; Pen: Tiaan Falcon (1/1) 63'; Cards: Marino Mikaele-Tu'u (yellow card) 39'

Navigation Homes Stadium, Pukekohe
Referee: Michael Winter

4 October 2019
19:35 NZST

North Harbour	42–34	Wellington
Try: Karl Tu'inukuafe 3'; Shaun Stevenson 16'; Matt Duffie (2) 19', 42'; Harrison Groundwater 24'; Bryn Hall 33'; Con: Matt McGahan (3/6) 3', 17', 44'; Pen: Matt McGahan (1/1) 14'; Shaun Stevenson (1/2) 50'	Report	Try: James Blackwell 36'; Vince Aso 47'; Kemara Hauiti-Parapara 58'; Sitiveni Paongo 72'; Wes Goosen 77'; Con: Jackson Garden-Bachop (3/5) 49', 58', 73'; Pen: Jackson Garden-Bachop (1/1) 6'

North Harbour Stadium, Albany
Referee: Tipene Cottrell

5 October 2019
14:35 NZST

Bay of Plenty	46–10	Manawatu
Try: Joe Ravouvou (3) 8', 50', 59'; Kurt Eklund 39'; Emoni Narawa 47'; Richard Judd 75'; Jason Robertson 78'; Con: Kaleb Trask (1/2) 40'; Jason Robertson (3/5) 52', 75', 80'; Pen: Kaleb Trask (1/2) 18'	Report	Try: Jamie Booth 62'; Con: Otere Black (1/1) 63'; Pen: Andre Taylor (1/1) 2'

Tauranga Domain, Tauranga
Referee: Daniel Waenga

5 October 2019
17:05 NZST

Auckland	64–7	Southland
Try: Waimana Riedlinger-Kapa 3'; Caleb Clarke (2) 6', 72'; Salesi Rayasi 17'; TJ Faiane 21'; Jonathan Ruru 43'; Dalton Papalii (2) 53', 58'; Danny Tusitala (2) 76', 79'; Con: Harry Plummer (7/10) 5', 23', 45', 54', 59', 77', 80'	Report	Try: Greg Pleasants-Tate 67'; Con: Marty McKenzie (1/1) 68'

Eden Park, Auckland
Referee: Tim Griffiths

5 October 2019
19:35 NZST

Otago	25–35	Canterbury – RS
Try: Sio Tomkinson 53'; Adam Thomson 68'; Jona Nareki 75'; Con: Josh Ioane (2/3) 53', 69'; Pen: Josh Ioane (2/4) 35', 40'	Report	Try: Josh McKay 13'; Mitchell Drummond 42'; Sam Gilbert 56'; Tim Bateman 71'; Con: Brett Cameron (3/4) 14', 43', 57'; Pen: Brett Cameron (3/4) 10', 20', 79'; Cards: Tim Bateman (yellow card) 75'

Forsyth Barr Stadium, Dunedin
Referee: Glen Jackson

6 October 2019
14:05 NZST

Tasman	52–6	Northland
Try: Te Ahiwaru Cirikidaveta 17'; Will Jordan (2) 26', 64'; Sione Havili 34'; Jamie Spowart 40'; Wyatt Crockett 72'; Tim O'Malley 77'; Taina Fox-Matamua 79'; Con: Mitchell Hunt (6/8) 27', 36', 42', 65', 74', 80'	Report	Pen: Jack Debreczeni (2/3) 15', 20'

Trafalgar Park, Nelson
Referee: Hugh Reed

6 October 2019
16:35 NZST

Waikato	38–19	Taranaki
Try: Solomon Alaimalo (2) 5', 72'; Declan O'Donnell 14'; Samisoni Taukei'aho 40'; Quinn Tupaea 54'; James Tucker 69'; Con: Fletcher Smith (4/6) 16', 40', 70', 73'	Report	Try: Teihorangi Walden 8'; Sean Wainui 36'; Pita Gus Sowakula 48'; Con: Stephen Perofeta (2/3) 36', 48'

Waikato Stadium, Hamilton
Referee: James Munro

=== Week 10 ===
10 October 2019
19:35 NZST

Southland	12–22	Bay of Plenty
Try: Matthew James 32'; Raymond Nu'u 40'; Con: Marty McKenzie (1/2) 40'; Pen: Marty McKenzie (0/1); Cards: Marty McKenzie (yellow card) 68'	Report	Try: Mitchell Karpik 25'; Emoni Narawa 46'; Te Aihe Toma 63'; Tom Franklin 70'; Con: Jason Robertson (0/3); Te Aihe Toma (1/1) 72'

Rugby Park Stadium, Invercargill
Referee: Michael Winter

11 October 2019
19:35 NZST

Taranaki	11–35	Auckland
Try: Ricky Riccitelli 22'; Con: Stephen Perofeta (0/1); Pen: Stephen Perofeta (2/3) 4', 34'	Report	Try: Dalton Papalii 29'; Adrian Choat 45'; Salesi Rayasi 75'; Jordan Trainor 80'; Con: Harry Plummer (1/2) 46'; Daniel Kirkpatrick (2/2) 76', 80'; Pen: Harry Plummer (3/4) 7', 65', 67'; Cards: Dalton Papalii (yellow card) 52'

Yarrow Stadium, New Plymouth
Referee: Glen Jackson

12 October 2019
14:35 NZST

Hawke's Bay	28–47	Tasman
Try: Marino Mikaele-Tu'u 5'; Devan Flanders 22'; Caleb Makene 68'; Jason Long 77'; Con: Tiaan Falcon (3/3) 6', 23', 69'; Lincoln McClutchie (1/1) 78'; Cards: Geoffrey Cridge (yellow card) 28'	Report	Try: Sione Havili 13'; Leicester Fainga'anuku (2) 31', 42'; Tima Fainga'anuku 40'; Mitchell Hunt 54'; Alex Nankivell 58'; Hugh Roach 61'; Con: Mitchell Hunt (4/5) 15', 31', 44', 56'; David Havili (2/2) 59', 62'

McLean Park, Napier
Referee: Richard Kelly

12 October 2019
17:05 NZST

Manawatu	33–17	Counties Manukau
Try: Otere Black 6'; Ngani Laumape 21'; Johnny Galloway 26'; Samu Tawake 39'; Ben Werthmuller 56'; Con: Otere Black (4/5) 22', 27', 40', 57'; Pen: Andre Taylor (0/1)	Report	Try: Liam Fitzsimons 40'; Daymon Leasuasu 58'; Rodney Tongotea 80'; Con: Orbyn Leger (1/2) 59'; Sean Bagshaw (0/1)

Arena Manawatu, Palmerston North
Referee: Daniel Waenga

12 October 2019
19:35 NZST

Wellington	39–21	Waikato
Try: Asafo Aumua (2) 34', 45'; Vince Aso 36'; Billy Proctor 39'; Kemara Hauiti-Parapara 49'; Con: Jackson Garden-Bachop (4/5) 35', 40', 46', 50'; Pen: Jackson Garden-Bachop (2/2) 9', 29'	Report	Try: Samisoni Taukei'aho 20'; Bailyn Sullivan 57'; Louis Rogers 69'; Con: Fletcher Smith (3/3) 21', 57', 69'

Wellington Regional Stadium, Wellington
Referee: Angus Mabey

13 October 2019
14:05 NZST

Northland	40–10	Otago
Try: Aorangi Stokes 14'; Jordan Hyland (2) 19', 32'; Scott Gregory (2) 27', 47'; Setefano Funaki 71'; Con: Jack Debreczeni (5/6) 15', 28', 33', 48', 71'; Pen: Jack Debreczeni (0/1)	Report	Try: Henry Purdy 40'; Josh Timu 64'; Con: Josh Ioane (0/1); Vilimoni Koroi (0/1); Cards: Jonah Aoina (yellow card) 40'

Okara Park, Whangārei
Referee: James Munro

13 October 2019
16:35 NZST

RS – Canterbury	31–25	North Harbour
Try: Braydon Ennor 25'; Josh McKay (2) 37', 55'; Harry Allan 80'; Con: Brett Cameron (4/4) 26', 39', 58', 80'; Pen: Brett Cameron (1/3) 13'	Report	Try: Mark Tele'a (2) 31', 64'; Osea Qamasea 46'; Lewis Gjaltema 70'; Con: Shaun Stevenson (0/2); Bryn Hall (1/2) 66'; Pen: Shaun Stevenson (0/1); Bryn Hall (1/1) 50'

Rugby League Park, Christchurch
Referee: James Doleman

== Play-offs ==
Championship

Semi-finals
1	Bay of Plenty	64
4	Manawatu	3
2	Hawke's Bay	44
3	Otago	39

Final
1	Bay of Plenty	12
2	Hawke's Bay	7

Premiership

Semi-finals
1	Tasman	18
4	Auckland	9
2	Wellington	30
3	Canterbury	19

Final
1	Tasman	31
2	Wellington	14

=== Semi-finals ===
==== Championship ====
18 October 2019
19:35 NZST

Bay of Plenty	64–3	Manawatu
Try: Narawa (3) 6' m, 48' c, 57' m Ravouvou 12' m Vella 18' c Matenga 27' c Judd 33' c Ross 45' c Collier 60' c Robertson 74' c Con: Hollinshead (0/2); Tiatia (5/5) 19', 28', 34', 46', 49'; Robertson (2/3) 62', 75'; Pen: Hollinshead (0/1)	Report	Pen: Malcolm (1/1) 3'

Rotorua International Stadium, Rotorua
Referee: Richard Kelly

19 October 2019
16:35 NZST

Hawke's Bay	44–39 (a.e.t)	Otago
Try: Fomai 17' c Rakete-Stones 32' c McClutchie 54' c Flanders 60' c Emerson 87' c Con: Falcon (5/5) 19', 33', 56', 61', 88'; Pen: Falcon (3/3) 43', 92', 99'	Report	Try: Collins (2) 1' c, 26' c McDowall 8' c Morris-Lome 65' c Mafi 94' m Con: Ioane (4/5) 2', 10', 28', 66'; Pen: Ioane (2/2) 40', 83'

McLean Park, Napier
Referee: Angus Mabey

==== Premiership ====
19 October 2019
14:05 NZST

Tasman	18–9	Auckland
Try: Strange 69' c Nankivell 76' m Con: Hunt (1/2) 70'; Pen: Hunt (2/5) 38', 40'	Report	Pen: Plummer (3/4) 17', 47', 72'

Trafalgar Park, Nelson
Referee: James Doleman

19 October 2019
19:35 NZST

Wellington	30–19	Canterbury
Try: Renata 29' c Blackwell 33' c Lam 45' c Con: Garden-Bachop (3/3) 30', 35', 46'; Pen: Garden-Bachop (2/2) 6', 59'; Drop: Garden-Bachop (1/1) 76'	Report	Try: Whitelock 56' m Klein (2) 61' c, 66' c Con: Cameron (2/3) 62', 66'

Wellington Regional Stadium, Wellington
Referee: Glen Jackson

=== Finals ===
==== Championship ====
25 October 2019
19:35 NZST

Bay of Plenty	12–7	Hawke's Bay
Pen: Hollinshead (4/5) 5', 40', 45', 48'	Report	Try: Lowe 57' c Con: Falcon (1/1) 58'

Rotorua International Stadium, Rotorua
Referee: Richard Kelly

==== Premiership ====
26 October 2019
18:05 NZST

Tasman	31–14	Wellington
Try: Jordan (2) 14' c, 77' m Havili 22' c Con: Hunt (2/3) 15', 23'; Pen: Hunt (4/5) 2', 5', 18', 49'; Havili (0/1)	Report	Try: Fidow 28' m Con: Garden-Bachop (0/1); Pen: Garden-Bachop (3/5) 13', 21', 26'

Trafalgar Park, Nelson
Referee: Glen Jackson

FB	15	David Havili (c)
RW	14	Will Jordan
OC	13	Levi Aumua	(substituted off) 51'
IC	12	Alex Nankivell	(substituted off) 79'
LW	11	Leicester Fainga'anuku
FH	10	Mitchell Hunt
SH	9	Finlay Christie	(substituted off) 68'
N8	8	Jordan Taufua	(substituted off) 50'
OF	7	Sione Havili
BF	6	Liam Squire
RL	5	Pari Pari Parkinson
LL	4	Quinten Strange
TP	3	Tyrel Lomax	(substituted off) 68'
HK	2	Andrew Makalio	(substituted off) 60'
LP	1	Tim Perry	(substituted off) 48'
Replacements:
HK	16	Hugh Roach	(substituted on) 60'
PR	17	Wyatt Crockett	(substituted on) 48'
PR	18	Isaac Salmon	(substituted on) 68'
LK	19	Te Ahiwaru Cirikidaveta
FL	20	Jacob Norris	(substituted on) 50'
SH	21	Keisuke Uchida	(substituted on) 68'
FH	22	Tim O'Malley	(substituted on) 79'
CE	23	Fetuli Paea	(substituted on) 51'

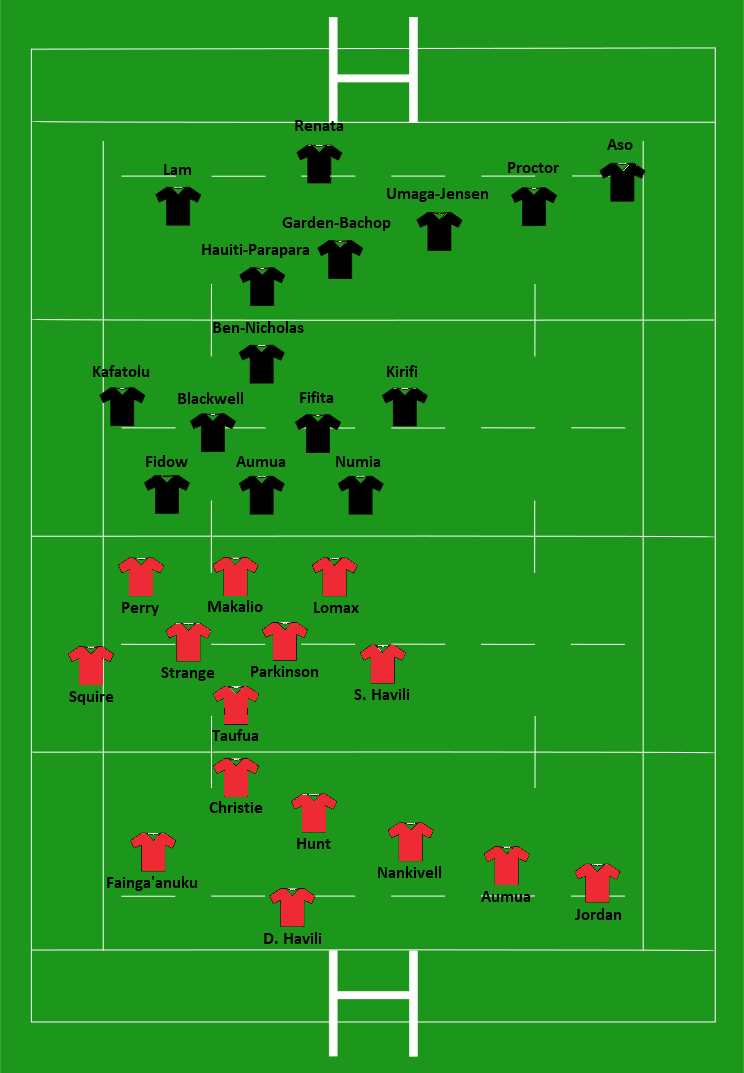

FB	15	Trent Renata
RW	14	Ben Lam	(substituted off) 68'
OC	13	Billy Proctor
IC	12	Peter Umaga-Jensen	(substituted off) 52'
LW	11	Vince Aso
FH	10	Jackson Garden-Bachop
SH	9	Kemara Hauiti-Parapara	(substituted off) 72'
N8	8	Teariki Ben-Nicholas
OF	7	Du'Plessis Kirifi (c)
BF	6	Mateaki Kafatolu
RL	5	James Blackwell	(substituted off) 57'
LL	4	Vaea Fifita	(substituted off) 72'
TP	3	Alex Fidow
HK	2	Asafo Aumua
LP	1	Xavier Numia
Replacements:
HK	16	James O'Reilly
PR	17	Sitiveni Paongo
PR	18	Sef Fa'agase
LK	19	Naitoa Ah Kuoi	(substituted on) 57'
LK	20	Joshua Furno	(substituted on) 72'
SH	21	Connor Collins	(substituted on) 72'
WG	22	Connor Garden-Bachop	(substituted on) 68'
CE	23	Pepesana Patafilo	(substituted on) 52'

== Statistics ==
=== Leading point scorers ===
No.	Player	Team	Points	Average	Details
1	Jackson Garden-Bachop	Wellington	116	9.67	0 T, 28 C, 19 P, 1 D
2	Mitchell Hunt	Tasman	102	10.20	1 T, 32 C, 11 P, 0 D
3	Brett Cameron	Canterbury	99	9.00	1 T, 32 C, 10 P, 0 D
4	Jack Debreczeni	Northland	88	8.80	2 T, 21 C, 12 P, 0 D
5	Fletcher Smith	Waikato	83	8.30	1 T, 27 C, 8 P, 0 D
6	Otere Black	Manawatu	75	6.82	2 T, 19 C, 9 P, 0 D
7	Josh Ioane	Otago	72	9.00	1 T, 20 C, 9 P, 0 D
8	Dan Hollinshead	Bay of Plenty	71	7.89	1 T, 15 C, 12 P, 0 D
9	Harry Plummer	Auckland	63	7.88	1 T, 17 C, 8 P, 0 D
10	Vilimoni Koroi	Otago	58	5.27	6 T, 8 C, 4 P, 0 D

Source: The weekly reviews of the matches published on provincial.rugby (see "Report" in the individual match scoring stats).

=== Leading try scorers ===
No.	Player	Team	Tries	Average
1	Josh McKay	Canterbury	11	1.00
2	Emoni Narawa	Bay of Plenty	9	0.75
3	Jona Nareki	Otago	8	0.89
4	Joe Ravouvou	Bay of Plenty	8	0.89
5	Will Jordan	Tasman	7	0.64
6	Quinn Tupaea	Waikato	7	0.78
7	Ash Dixon	Hawke's Bay	7	0.64
8	Leicester Fainga'anuku	Tasman	7	0.64
9	Matt Duffie	North Harbour	7	0.70
10	Vilimoni Koroi	Otago	6	0.55

Source: The weekly reviews of the matches published on provincial.rugby (see "Report" in the individual match scoring stats).

=== Points by week ===
Team	1		2		3		4		5		6		7		8		9		10		Total		Average	
Auckland	28	28	43	10	19	13	20	20	22	32	28	13	15	34	0	40	64	7	35	11	274	208	27.40	20.80
Bay of Plenty	50	7	40	14	13	19	27	19	15	16	31	17	46	22	51	24	46	10	22	12	341	160	34.10	16.00
Canterbury	28	31	8	23	22	23	80	0	32	22	42	12	29	32	38	5	35	25	31	25	345	198	34.50	19.80
Counties Manukau	29	34	39	25	26	31	22	29	0	36	13	28	14	42	5	38	10	22	17	33	175	318	17.50	31.80
Hawke's Bay	31	13	27	27	29	21	43	28	41	23	27	24	35	17	24	51	22	10	28	47	307	261	30.70	26.10
Manawatu	13	31	10	13	3	64	20	37	31	25	31	26	32	29	16	29	10	46	33	17	199	317	19.90	31.70
North Harbour	28	28	25	39	33	12	19	27	38	36	17	21	15	21	29	16	42	34	25	31	271	265	27.10	26.50
Northland	27	17	10	43	19	52	28	43	25	31	12	42	22	46	36	57	6	52	40	10	225	393	22.50	39.30
Otago	7	50	41	22	21	29	37	20	35	27	24	54	21	15	45	35	25	35	10	40	266	327	26.60	32.70
Southland	17	27	22	41	12	33	0	80	23	41	26	31	42	14	0	19	7	64	12	22	161	372	16.10	37.20
Taranaki	34	29	13	10	52	19	18	28	27	35	17	31	17	35	19	0	19	38	11	35	227	260	22.70	26.00
Tasman	45	8	23	8	64	3	28	18	36	0	21	17	35	26	40	0	52	6	47	28	391	114	39.10	11.40
Waikato	31	28	14	40	31	26	20	20	36	38	24	27	26	35	35	45	38	19	21	39	276	317	27.60	31.70
Wellington	8	45	27	27	23	22	29	22	16	15	54	24	34	15	57	36	34	42	39	21	321	269	32.10	26.90

Source: Mitre 10 Cup Fixtures and Results 2019

=== Tries by week ===
Team	1		2		3		4		5		6		7		8		9		10		Total		Average	
Auckland	4	4	6	1	3	1	2	2	3	4	4	2	2	4	0	6	10	1	4	1	38	26	3.80	2.60
Bay of Plenty	8	1	5	2	1	3	3	3	2	1	5	2	7	3	8	4	7	1	4	2	50	22	5.00	2.20
Canterbury	4	4	1	3	3	3	12	0	4	3	6	2	5	4	6	1	4	3	4	4	49	27	4.90	2.70
Counties Manukau	4	5	5	4	4	4	4	4	0	5	2	4	2	5	1	6	1	3	3	5	26	45	2.60	4.50
Hawke's Bay	5	1	4	4	4	3	7	3	7	3	4	4	4	2	4	8	3	1	4	7	46	36	4.60	3.60
Manawatu	1	5	2	1	0	10	2	5	4	3	4	4	4	5	2	5	1	7	5	3	25	48	2.50	4.80
North Harbour	4	4	4	5	5	2	3	3	6	5	1	2	2	3	5	2	6	5	4	4	40	35	4.00	3.50
Northland	3	3	1	6	3	8	3	7	3	4	2	6	3	7	5	8	0	8	6	2	29	59	2.90	5.90
Otago	1	8	6	3	3	4	5	2	4	3	4	8	3	2	6	5	3	4	2	6	37	45	3.70	4.50
Southland	3	3	3	6	2	5	0	12	3	7	4	4	5	2	0	3	1	10	2	4	23	56	2.30	5.60
Taranaki	5	4	1	2	8	3	2	4	3	4	2	5	2	4	3	0	3	6	1	4	30	36	3.00	3.60
Tasman	7	1	3	1	10	0	4	2	5	0	2	1	4	3	6	0	8	0	7	4	56	12	5.60	1.20
Waikato	4	4	2	5	4	4	2	2	5	6	4	4	3	4	5	6	6	3	3	5	38	43	3.80	4.30
Wellington	1	7	4	4	3	3	4	4	1	2	8	4	4	2	8	5	5	6	5	3	43	40	4.30	4.00

For	Against

Source: The weekly reviews of the matches published on provincial.rugby (see "Report" in the individual match scoring stats).

=== Sanctions ===
Player	Team	Red	Yellow	Sent off match(es)
Fa'asiu Fuatai	Bay of Plenty	1	0	vs Northland
Sikeli Nabou	Counties Manukau	0	2	vs Tasman and Southland
Bryn Hall	North Harbour	0	1	vs Auckland
Samuel Slade	Counties Manukau	0	1	vs Taranaki
Tom Christie	Canterbury	0	1	vs Waikato
Lincoln McClutchie	Hawke's Bay	0	1	vs Otago
Jona Nareki	Otago	0	1	vs Hawke's Bay
Chase Tiatia	Bay of Plenty	0	1	vs Auckland
Hoskins Sotutu	Auckland	0	1	vs Bay of Plenty
Joe Walsh	Southland	0	1	vs North Harbour
Sean Bagshaw	Counties Manukau	0	1	vs Wellington
Donald Maka	Counties Manukau	0	1	vs Wellington
Isileli Tu'ungafasi	Northland	0	1	vs Hawke's Bay
Isaia Walker-Leawere	Hawke's Bay	0	1	vs Northland
James Tucker	Waikato	0	1	vs Auckland
Mitchell Karpik	Bay of Plenty	0	1	vs North Harbour
Morgan Mitchell	Southland	0	1	vs Hawke's Bay
Billy Harmon	Canterbury	0	1	vs Auckland
Mason Emerson	Hawke's Bay	0	1	vs Waikato
Antonio Shalfoon	Waikato	0	1	vs Hawke's Bay
Akira Ioane	Auckland	0	1	vs Counties Manukau
Tumua Manu	Auckland	0	1	vs Counties Manukau
Jonathan Ruru	Auckland	0	1	vs Counties Manukau
Levi Aumua	Tasman	0	1	vs North Harbour
Ropate Rinakama	North Harbour	0	1	vs Tasman
Leighton Price	Taranaki	0	1	vs Hawke's Bay
Heiden Bedwell-Curtis	Taranaki	0	1	vs Hawke's Bay
Lewis Ormond	Southland	0	1	vs Counties Manukau
Michael Collins	Otago	0	1	vs North Harbour
Gerard Cowley-Tuioti	North Harbour	0	1	vs Otago
Wyatt Crockett	Tasman	0	1	vs Auckland
Emoni Narawa	Bay of Plenty	0	1	vs Hawke's Bay
Nathaniel Apa	Counties Manukau	0	1	vs Canterbury
Fletcher Smith	Waikato	0	1	vs Otago
Marino Mikaele-Tu'u	Hawke's Bay	0	1	vs Counties Manukau
Tim Bateman	Canterbury	0	1	vs Otago
Marty McKenzie	Southland	0	1	vs Bay of Plenty
Dalton Papalii	Auckland	0	1	vs Taranaki
Geoffrey Cridge	Hawke's Bay	0	1	vs Tasman
Jonah Aoina	Otago	0	1	vs Northland

== Ranfurly Shield ==
=== Pre-season challenges ===
For the 2019 preseason Otago saw challenges from the reigning 2018 Heartland Championship champions Thames Valley as well as neighbours North Otago.

13 July 2019
14:05 NZST

Otago	41–21	Thames Valley
Try: Pole 40' c Lentjes 45' m Miller 52' c Morris 60' c Nel 71' c McDowall 80' m Con: Miller (4/5) 40', 52', 61', 72'; Faddes (0/1); Pen: Miller (1/2) 78'	Preview; Report	Try: Lafituanai (2) 29' c, 75' m Con: Boughton (1/1) 30'; Berridge (0/1); Pen: Boughton (3/5) 8', 20', 48'; Cards: Easton (yellow card) 44'

Wanaka Showgrounds, Wānaka
Attendance: 3,500
Referee: Nick Webster

26 July 2019
14:05 NZST

Otago	49–14	North Otago
Try: Koroi 10' c Dickson 17' c Moeke 37' c Nareki 43' c Gouws 62' c Ma'u 72' c Lentjes 77' c Con: Moeke (7/7) 11', 18', 38', 44', 63', 73', 78'; Pen: Moeke (0/1); Cards: Tomkinson (yellow card) 27'	Preview; Report	Try: Packman 28' c Dibben 59' c Con: Smith (2/2) 29', 60'

Centennial Park, Oamaru
Attendance: 5,000
Referee: Rebecca Mahoney

== See also ==
- 2019 Heartland Championship
