= Rayasi =

Rayasi is a surname. Notable people with the surname include:

- Filipe Rayasi (born 1969), Fijian rugby union player
- Salesi Rayasi (born 1996), New Zealand rugby union player
