= Carlos Price =

New Zealand rugby player

- Born: 30 September 1998 (age 28) New Zealand
- Height: 179 cm (5 ft 10 in)
- Weight: 86 kg (13 st 8 lb; 190 lb)
- School: Saint Kentigern College

Rugby union career
- Position(s): First-Five-Eighth, Half-Back
- Current team: Bay Of Plenty Steamers
Senior career
| Years | Team | Apps | (Points) |
| 2017–2018 | Wellington | 12 | (0) |
| 2019 | Waikato | 6 | (0) |
- Correct as of 7 March 2021
Super Rugby
| Years | Team | Apps | (Points) |
| 2018 | Hurricanes | 0 | (0) |
International career
| Years | Team | Apps | (Points) |
| 2 | New Zealand Under 20 | 4 | (10) |

Carlos Price is a professional rugby union player who plays for the Bay Of Plenty Steamers in the Bunnings NPC. His position of choice is First Five Eighth.

Price signed a two-year contract with Wellington in the Mitre 10 Cup aged 17 years. He also spent large parts of these years on an injury replacement player contract with the Hurricanes in Super Rugby. Price was a part of four pre-season games, however he never received a Super Rugby cap.

Price spent two years representing New Zealand in the national under-20 rugby union team. in 2019, Price signed with the Waikato for the 2019 Mitre 10 Cup season.

Outside of rugby, Price founded a clothing business in 2019 called One Three Eight.
