= Tiaan Falcon =

New Zealand rugby union player

- Full name: Tiaan James Falcon
- Born: 19 June 1997 (age 29) Penrith, Australia
- Height: 180 cm (5 ft 11 in)
- Weight: 89 kg (196 lb; 14 st 0 lb)
- School: Lindisfarne College
- Notable relative: Gordon Falcon (father)

Rugby union career
- Position(s): First five-eighth, fullback, Centre
- Current team: Canon Eagles
Senior career
Years	Team	Apps	(Points)
2016–2019 2021	Hawke's Bay	34	(102)
2018–2020	Chiefs	4	(0)
2021–2026	Toyota Verblitz	47	(266)
2026–	Canon Eagles		
- Correct as of 9 June 2026
International career
Years	Team	Apps	(Points)
2017	New Zealand U20	7	(109)
- Correct as of 20 June 2020

Tiaan Falcon (born 19 June 1997) is a New Zealand rugby union player, who currently plays as a fly-half or fullback for Toyota Verblitz in the Japan Rugby League One competition. He formerly played for the Chiefs in Super Rugby and for Hawke's Bay in New Zealand's domestic National Provincial Championship competition.

== Early life and career ==
Falcon was born in Penrith, where his father – former New Zealand Māori, Hurricanes and Hawke's Bay loose forward Gordon Falcon – played rugby league for the Penrith Panthers. With his family, he moved to New Zealand when he was two years old.

In Hawke's Bay, Falcon attended Lindisfarne College from 2011-2015. While there, he played for the school's 1st XV team. He also represented Hawke's Bay at under 14, under 16 and under 18 level.

In 2014 and 2015, Falcon was invited to attend the Hurricanes U18 Camp. In his second year, he played for the Hurricanes U18 team in their annual game against the Crusaders U18 team.

On 19 September 2015, Falcon played for the New Zealand Barbarians Schools team in a match against New Zealand Schools.

== Senior career ==
Following in the footsteps of his grandfather – former New Zealand Māori, Hawke's Bay and East Coast loose forward – Ray Falcon (40 games for Hawke's Bay, 1980-1983) and father Gordon Falcon (71 appearances for Hawke's Bay, 1989-1998), Tiaan became the third generation Falcon to play for the Hawke's Bay Magpies in 2016.

Falcon made his Hawke's Bay debut on 20 August 2016 – from the reserves bench – against Wellington. He got his first start for the Magpies, in the 12 jersey, on 7 September 2016 against Auckland and scored his first try for the province against Southland on 19 August 2017.

Falcon played for the Hurricanes U20 team and Hurricanes senior team (during preseason) in 2017, before eventually signing a 2-year contract with the Chiefs ahead of the 2018 Super Rugby season, at the back of an outstanding performance for the New Zealand U20 team during the 2017 World Rugby Under 20 Championship.

Falcon made his first appearance for the Chiefs during the 2018 Brisbane Global Rugby Tens on 9 and 10 February 2018. A surprisingly early Super Rugby starting debut followed on 2 March 2018 in the game against the Blues in Auckland, when starting fullback Shaun Stevenson got injured during the warm-up and Falcon was promoted from the reserves bench to the starting line-up, ten minutes before kick-off. Despite wearing Stevenson's 15 jersey, Falcon started the game at first five-eighth, with Damian McKenzie shifting to fullback. In the Chiefs' next game, two weeks later, against the Bulls in Hamilton, he again started at 10.

Unfortunately, not long after that game, Falcon injured his hand and didn't play until the Chiefs' final game of the regular season against the Hurricanes, on 13 July 2018, in which he only got two minutes of game time off the bench. He returned to play for Hawke's Bay during the 2018 Mitre 10 Cup season, but suffered a season-ending shoulder injury during their round 5 game against Waikato on 13 September 2018.

During the 2019 Super Rugby season, Falcon didn't fare any better on the injury front. He ruptured his Achilles tendon in January and had a major shoulder operation in April, that year. As a result, he didn't play a single game for the Chiefs that season. He made his return for Hawke's Bay against Counties Manukau on 3 October 2019 in round 9 of the 2019 Mitre 10 Cup. He also represented Hawke's Bay at the Central Regional Sevens tournament in Levin and the New Zealand National Rugby Sevens Tournament, later that year.

Falcon returned for a third year with the Chiefs in 2020, but played only one Super Rugby game that season; a 15-minute spell off the bench against the Sunwolves on 15 February 2020 in Tokyo.

On 20 August 2020, the Chiefs announced that Falcon would be leaving the franchise to take up a 2-year contract with Japan Rugby League One club Toyota Verblitz. The Japanese club confirmed the signing on 5 October 2020. He would not play for Hawke's Bay during the 2020 Mitre 10 Cup season.

Falcon made his debut for Toyota Verblitz on 13 March 2021 against Munakata Sanix Blues. He scored two tries and seven conversions – a total of 24 points – in his debut game. Unfortunately, he only played two games for the club, that season. The competition was cancelled after round 6 due to the COVID-19 pandemic.

On 5 June 2021, it was announced that Falcon had renegotiated a release from his Japanese contract to play for Hawke's Bay during the 2021 Bunnings NPC season before returning to Japan – in September 2021 – to rejoin Toyota Verblitz for the 2022 Japan Rugby League One season. He played six games for the Magpies in 2021, including a thriller Ranfurly Shield defence against Bay of Plenty, in which he scored a penalty to tie the game at 33-33, before kicking the match-winning penalty in golden point extra time.

On 15 May 2026, Toyota Verblitz announced that Falcon would be leaving the club at the end of the 2025–2026 Japan Rugby League One season. He played six seasons for the club.

== International career ==
In April 2017, Falcon was named in the New Zealand Under-20 squad for the 2017 Oceania Rugby Under 20 Championship, which that year consisted of tests against Australia, Fiji and Samoa. He played in all three games and New Zealand retained the Oceania title.

On 8 May 2017, Falcon was also named in the New Zealand Under-20 squad for the 2017 World Rugby Under 20 Championship in Georgia. He was a standout for New Zealand at the tournament, drawing worldwide attention with a brilliant behind-the-back pass to team mate Marino Mikaele-Tu'u, who put Caleb Clarke over for a try in the semi-final against France. Unfortunately, he suffered a concussion later in that game and was ruled out of the final against England. New Zealand won that final with a record score of 64 –17 and were crowned World Rugby U20 Champions for the sixth time. Falcon was the top scorer of the tournament with 69 points and was one of the players nominated for player of the tournament.
