= Robbie Malneek =

- Born: 3 April 1983 (age 43) Masterton, New Zealand
- Height: 1.83 m (6 ft 0 in)
- Weight: 91 kg (201 lb)
- School: Nayland College; Nelson College

Rugby union career
- Position(s): Fullback, Wing
Senior career
Years	Team	Apps	(Points)
2007–2009	Rugby Parma	27	(35)
2012–2013	Rugby Reggio	16	(30)
2014–2015	CR & FC	15	(30)
2015	Yenisey-STM Krasnoyarsk	3	(0)
2016	Mystic River	6	(5)
Provincial / State sides
Years	Team	Apps	(Points)
2002–2005	Nelson Bays	28	
2006–2015, 2017	Tasman	104	(125)
- Correct as of 28 September 2017

Robbie Malneek (born 3 April 1983) is a New Zealand rugby union player.

== Early career ==
Malneek was born in Masterton, but moved with his family to Nelson aged eight. He attended secondary school first at Nayland College, where he played hooker, and then, from 2000 to 2001, Nelson College, where he moved to the back line and eventually fullback.

== Senior career ==
He made his provincial debut for Nelson Bays in 2002, and has played for Tasman since that union was formed in 2006. He is currently the most capped player in Tasman's short history. He has also had two stints playing in Italy, first with Parma in the 2007/08 and 2008/09 seasons, and then at Reggio in 2012/13.

Following the completion of 2014 ITM Cup Malneek travelled to Sri Lanka to play for CR & FC during the 2014/15 season. In the Spring of 2016, Malneek played with Mystic River Rugby Club in Boston, Massachusetts in the American Rugby Premiership.
