= Nayland College =

Location
- 166 Nayland Road, Stoke, Nelson; 41°18′20.20″S 173°13′57.56″E

Information
- Type: State coeducational secondary school
- Motto: Loyalty and Honour
- Established: 1966; 60 years ago
- Ministry of Education Institution no.: 293
- Principal: Kenneth Diamond
- Enrolment: 1,275 (July 2026)
- Socio-economic decile: 6
- Website: nayland.school.nz

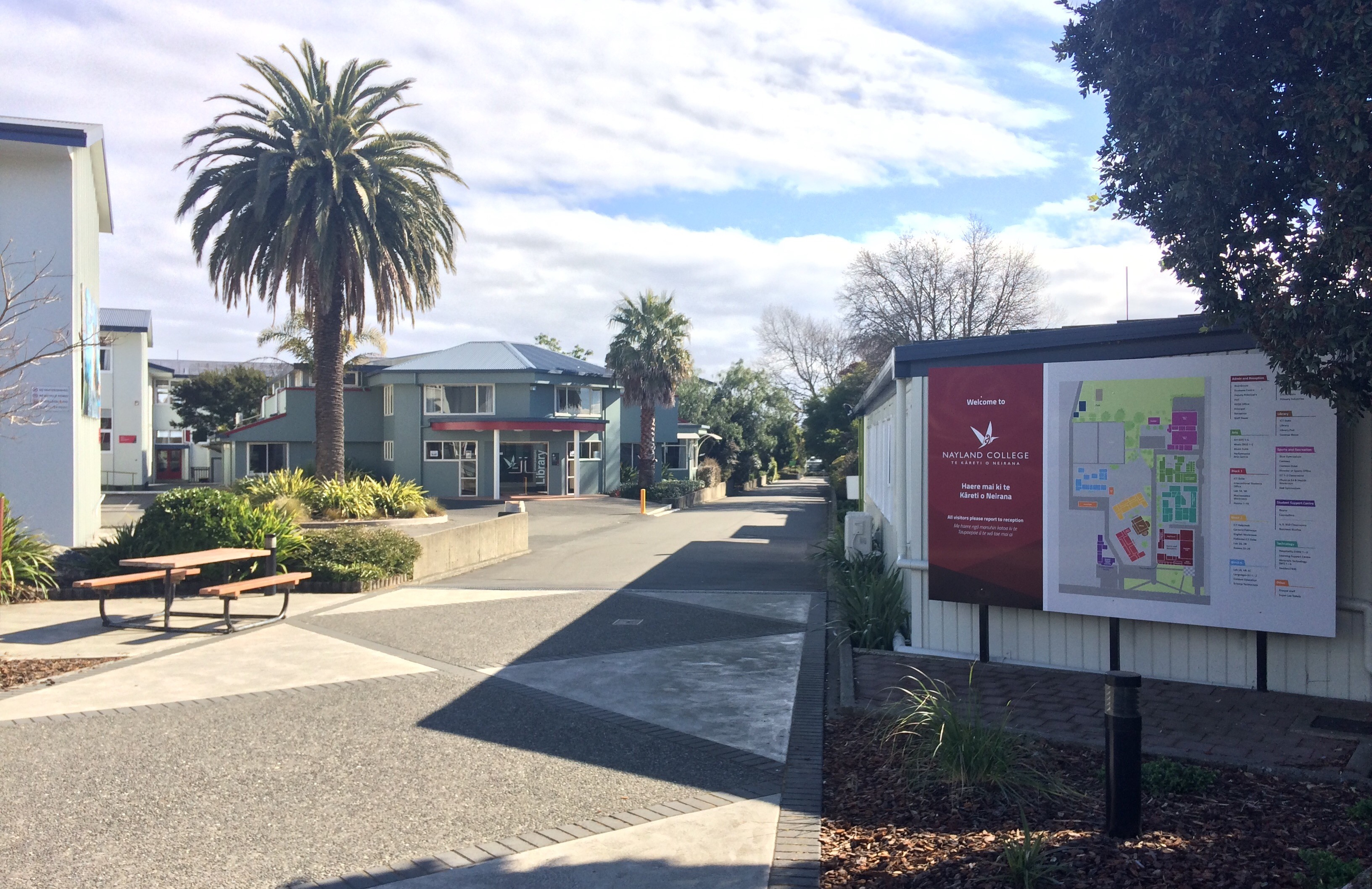
Nayland College's central driveway and library, August 2017

Nayland College is a coeducational state secondary school located in Stoke, Nelson, New Zealand. It is one of three secondary schools in Nelson that are coeducational. The school was officially opened on 3 February 1966.

== Crest ==
The crest is divided into quarters. The sailing ship represents discovery, the model of the atom represents research in reference to Lord Rutherford's work. The pine cone references forestry and the importance of this industry in New Zealand. The migratory godwit represents dispersal of students throughout the world.

== Enrolment ==
As of July 2026, Nayland College has a roll of 1,275 students, of which 207 (16.2%) identify as Māori.

As of 2026, the school has an Equity Index of 462, placing it amongst schools whose students have average socioeconomic barriers to achievement (roughly equivalent to deciles 5 and 6 under the former socio-economic decile system).

== Extra-curricular ==
Notable extra-curricular activities of the college include its well-regarded student produced newspaper and biennial musical productions. "The Circuit" is the longest running high school newspaper in New Zealand.

The school has an active sports department with two gyms and multiple health and physical education rooms. Nayland College's best finish at the New Zealand Secondary School Football Championship was second place in 2010. Former student Gagame Feni is a regular for ASB Premiership side Canterbury United. Jeremy Brockie is a former Nayland College student and more recently Coey Turipa, Jamie Doris and Alex Ridsdale have all gone on to star for their specific New Zealand age-grade side.

== Notable alumni ==
=== Arts ===
- Kristian Lavercombe – actor and singer
- Carthew Neal – film, television and interactive producer
- Laura Solomon – prize-winning novelist, playwright and poet

=== Politics ===
- Chester Borrows – member of parliament for Whanganui

=== Sports ===
- Jeremy Brockie – All White
- Ceri Evans – former All White defender; also a Rhodes Scholar
- Brenda Lawson – World Double Sculls Champion, Olympian 4th place 1992
- Robbie Malneek – Former professional rugby union player for Tasman
- Liam Malone – 2016 Paralympic gold medallist
