= Dan Perrin =

- Full name: Daniel Murray Perrin
- Born: 7 January 1983 (age 43) New Brighton, New Zealand
- Height: 182 cm (6 ft 0 in)
- Weight: 101 kg (223 lb)
- School: Aranui High School
- Occupation: Butcher

Rugby union career
- Position: Hooker
Provincial / State sides
Years	Team	Apps	(Points)
2005	Nelson Bays	11	(0)
2006–09	Tasman	29	(10)
2010–12	Bay of Plenty	22	(5)
Super Rugby
Years	Team	Apps	(Points)
2009–10	Crusaders	8	(5)
2011	Chiefs	2	(0)
Coaching career
- Years: Team
- 2022: Tasman (co-coach)
- 2023–: Crusaders (assistant coach)

Daniel Murray Perrin (born 7 January 1983) is a New Zealand rugby union coach and former professional player.

== Early life ==
Perrin was raised in the Christchurch suburb of New Brighton and attended Aranui High School, where he partnered future All Black prop Ben Franks in the front row. He played his junior rugby with New Brighton RFC.

== Rugby career ==
A hooker, Perrin had a season with Nelson Bays before joining the newly formed Tasman team in 2006. The Crusaders called up Perrin from their wider training group in 2009 as injury cover for Corey Flynn and he made eight Super 14 appearances over two seasons. He linked up with the Bay of Plenty in 2010 seeking better opportunities and was signed by the Chiefs, though he found himself behind Hika Elliot and Aled de Malmanche.

Perrin became co-coach of Tasman in 2022 and the following year joined the Crusaders as forwards coach.
