= Mitch Hunt =

NZ rugby union player (born 1995)

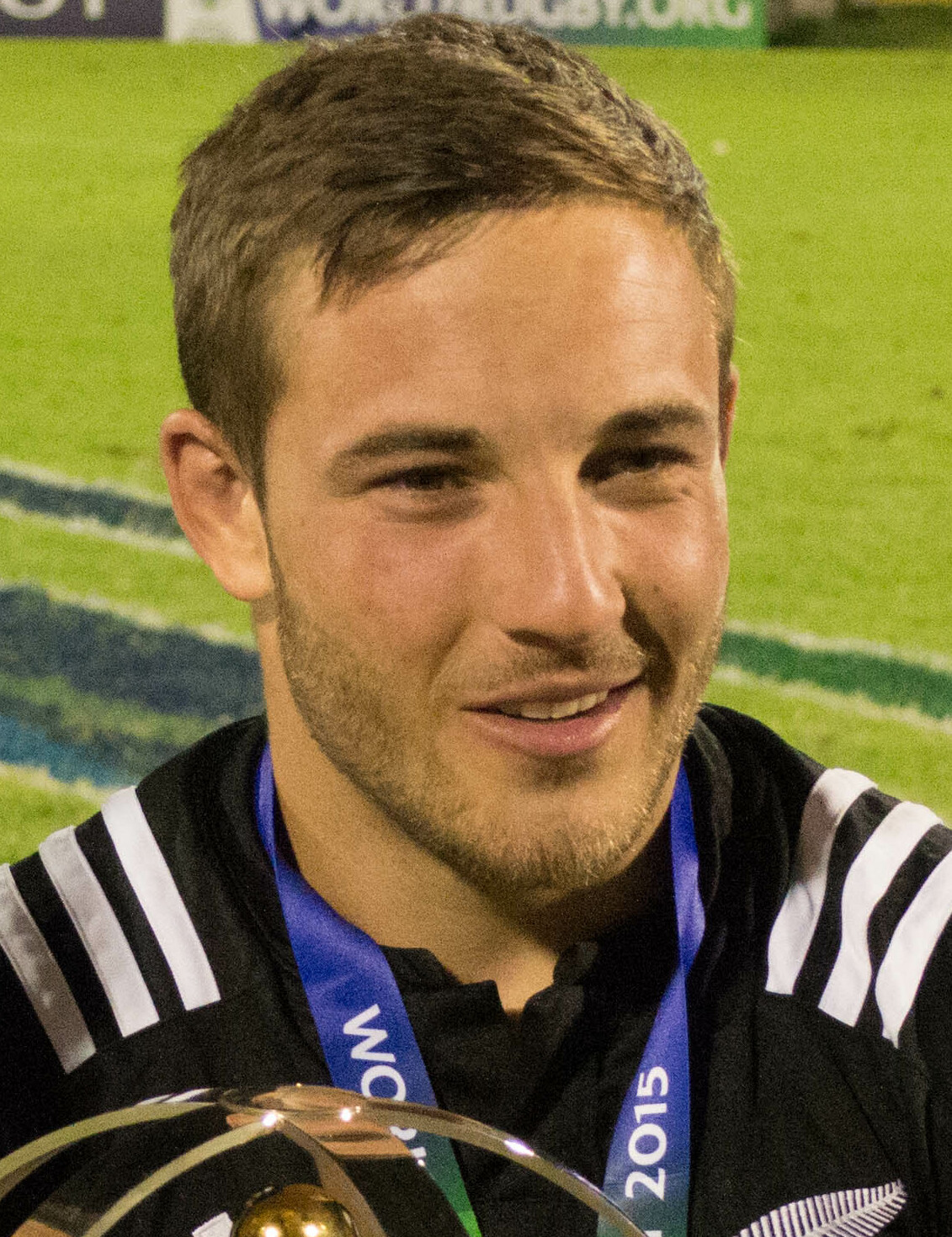
- Hunt at the 2015 World Rugby Under 20 Championship
- Full name: Mitchell James Hunt
- Born: 19 June 1995 (age 31) Nelson, New Zealand
- Height: 172 cm (5 ft 8 in)
- Weight: 88 kg (194 lb; 13 st 12 lb)
- School: Nelson College

Rugby union career
- Position(s): First five-eighth, Fullback
- Current team: Kamaishi Seawaves
Senior career
Years	Team	Apps	(Points)
2015	Auckland	7	(10)
2016–2019	Crusaders	45	(149)
2016–2023	Tasman	68	(562)
2020–2023	Highlanders	52	(247)
2023–2024	Honda Heat	15	(42)
2024–	Kamaishi Seawaves	25	(235)
- Correct as of 2 March 2024
International career
Years	Team	Apps	(Points)
2015	New Zealand U20	8	(56)
2020	North Island	1	(0)
- Correct as of 2 March 2024

Mitchell James Hunt (born 19 June 1995) is a New Zealand rugby union player who currently plays as a first five-eighth or fullback for the Honda Heat.

== Early career ==
Born and raised in the city of Nelson in the South Island of New Zealand, Hunt attended Nelson College in his hometown where he enjoyed a successful time, playing 51 times for their top side. He moved north to study engineering at the University of Auckland after graduating college and began playing local club rugby in the Auckland area. During his time in Auckland, he was a member of the Blues development squad and Auckland's national sevens team.

== Senior career ==
Hunt made the Auckland squad for the 2015 ITM Cup and scored 10 points in 7 games as his side reached the competition's final before going down to Canterbury. He returned home to Nelson in 2016 and turned out for the Tasman Mako. Playing mainly in the number 15 jersey, Hunt started all 12 games for the Mako during the season which again saw him finish on the losing side once again in the final, with Canterbury once more coming out on top. Hunt was part of the Tasman side that won the Mitre 10 Cup for the first time in 2019. He was picked in the North Island squad for the North vs South rugby union match in 2020 coming off the bench in a 35–38 loss for the North. In Round 6 of the 2020 Mitre 10 Cup Hunt played his 50th game for the Mako against Auckland at Eden Park in Auckland. The Mako went on to win their second premiership title in a row with Hunt starting all 12 games in the number 10 jersey and scoring 97 points in the 2020 season. Hunt was named as co captain of the Tasman Mako squad for the 2021 Bunnings NPC alongside Quinten Strange with the absence of regular captain David Havili due to All Blacks duties. Tasman went on to make the final with Hunt having another outstanding season before losing 23–20 to Waikato.

== Super Rugby ==
Just 7 appearances in his debut season of provincial rugby were all it took to convince the Christchurch-based Crusaders that he was worthy of a Super Rugby contract. He made their senior squad for the first time in 2016 and made 2 substitute appearances during his debut campaign. He was retained for the 2017 Super Rugby season. Hunt moved south to the Highlanders in 2020. Hunt had a very strong 2021 Super Rugby season establishing himself as the Highlanders first choice 10 as the side made the Super Rugby Trans-Tasman final where they lost 23–15 to the Blues.

== International career ==
Hunt was a member of the New Zealand side which won the 2015 World Rugby Under 20 Championship in Italy.
