= Quinten Strange =

NZ rugby union player (born 1996)

- Full name: Quinten J. Strange
- Born: 21 August 1996 (age 30) Tākaka, New Zealand
- Height: 199 cm (6 ft 6 in)
- Weight: 119 kg (262 lb; 18 st 10 lb)
- School: Nelson College

Rugby union career
- Position: Lock
- Current team: Urayasu D-Rocks
Senior career
Years	Team	Apps	(Points)
2016–2025	Tasman	85	(50)
2017–2025	Crusaders	74	(25)
2025–	Urayasu D-Rocks	5	(0)
- Correct as of 5 October 2025
International career
Years	Team	Apps	(Points)
2016	New Zealand U20	7	(15)
2023	All Blacks XV	2	(0)
- Correct as of 5 October 2025

Quinten J. Strange (born 21 August 1996) is a New Zealand rugby union player who currently plays as a lock.

== Early career ==
Strange was born in Tākaka and raised in Collingwood. He attended Nelson College where he captained their top side.

== Senior career ==
Strange was named in the Tasman Mako squad for the 2016 Mitre 10 Cup aged just 19 and instantly established himself as a regular, making 11 appearances, 10 of which were starting and scoring 2 tries as the side finished runners up in the Premiership division. Strange was vice captain of the Tasman Mako side that won the 2019 Mitre 10 Cup. Strange was again part of the Mako side that won the 2020 Mitre 10 Cup, again vice captain in a 12–13 win over Auckland in the final. Strange was named as co captain of the Tasman Mako squad for the 2021 Bunnings NPC alongside Mitchell Hunt with the absence of regular captain David Havili due to All Blacks duties. In the premiership semifinal of the competition against Hawke's Bay Strange played his 50th game for Tasman in a 27–33 win for the Mako. The next week the side lost 23–20 to Waikato in the final.

== Super Rugby ==
After just one season and 11 appearances at provincial level, he was handed a Super Rugby contract by the Crusaders ahead of the 2017 Super Rugby season. The move saw him link up with his former New Zealand Under 20 coach Scott Robertson who was in his debut season with the Crusaders having formerly coached Canterbury. Strange was part of the Crusaders team that won Super Rugby three times in a row in 2017, 2018 and 2019 and also the Super Rugby Aotearoa competition in 2020. Strange only played 4 games in the 2021 Super Rugby Aotearoa season as the Crusaders won their fifth title in a row with a 24–13 win over the Chiefs in the final. Strange captained the side in Round 3 of the 2022 Super Rugby Pacific season against Moana Pasifika. The Crusaders made it six in a row with a 7–21 win over the Blues in the final.

== International ==
Strange was a member of the New Zealand Under 20 side which competed in the 2016 World Rugby Under 20 Championship in England where he made seven appearances and scored three tries. Strange was named in the All Blacks squad for the 2020 Rugby Championship but later suffered an ankle injury which saw him miss the tournament.
