= Mark Tele'a =

New Zealand rugby union player (born 1996)

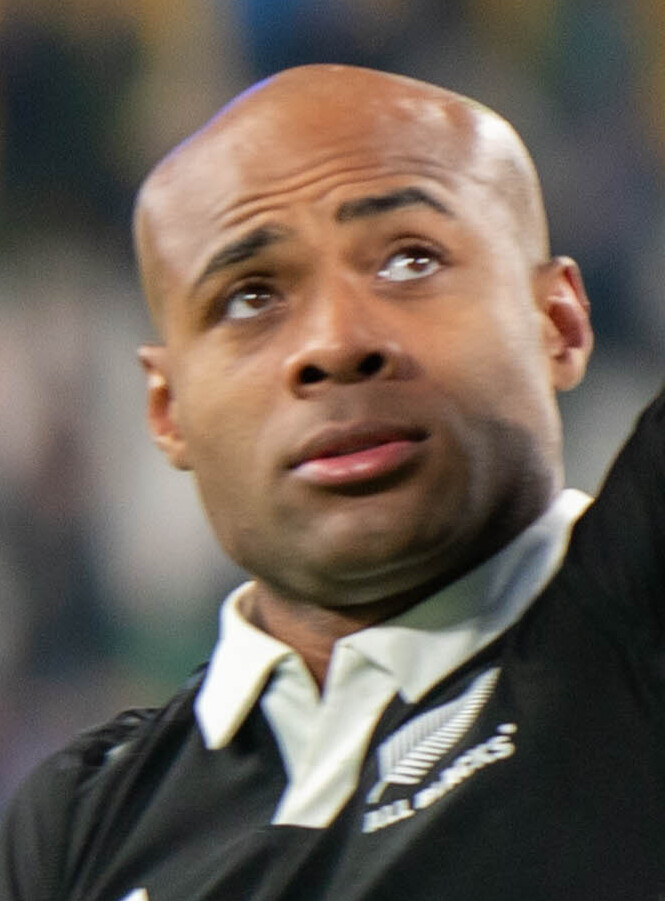
- Tele'a representing New Zealand against Italy in 2024
- Full name: Mark Evander Tele'a
- Born: 6 December 1996 (age 29) Auckland, New Zealand
- Height: 1.86 m (6 ft 1 in)
- Weight: 94 kg (207 lb; 14 st 11 lb)
- School: Massey High School

Rugby union career
- Position(s): Wing, Centre
- Current team: Toyota Verblitz
Senior career
| Years | Team | Apps | (Points) |
| 2016–2019, 2022–2025 | North Harbour | 41 | (65) |
| 2020–2025 | Blues | 80 | (205) |
| 2020–2021 | Tasman | 14 | (20) |
| 2025– | Toyota Verblitz | 17 | (50) |
- Correct as of 4 October 2025
International career
| Years | Team | Apps | (Points) |
| 2022–2024 | New Zealand | 19 | (65) |
- Correct as of 4 October 2025
Medal record
Men's rugby union
Representing New Zealand
Rugby World Cup
| Silver medal – second place | 2023 France | Team competition |

Mark Evander Tele'a (born 6 December 1996) is a New Zealand rugby union player who currently plays as a winger for the Toyota Verblitz in Japan Rugby League One. He formerly played for the Blues in Super Rugby and for North Harbour in New Zealand's domestic National Provincial Championship competition.

== Club career ==
After showing promising form for North Harbour during the 2019 Mitre 10 Cup season, Tele'a was named in the Blues squad for the 2020 Super Rugby season. Tele'a started the campaign as the first choice left wing for the Blues. Tele'a rewarded the faith of Blues staff, impressing with his early season form. Tele'a scored 3 tries during a Round 2 fixture, as the Blues defeated the Waratahs 32-12 in rainy conditions in Newcastle. Tele'a crossed again in Round 4 vs the Bulls in Pretoria, scoring impressively to dot the ball down as two defenders forced him into touch. He continued his good form in Super Rugby Aotearoa and in mid 2020 he was chosen for the North Island in the North vs South rugby union match. Tele'a was named in the Tasman squad for the 2020 Mitre 10 Cup making his debut for the Mako in Round 1 against Counties Manukau. Tele'a played 11 games for the Mako in the 2020 season as they went on to win their second premiership title in a row. Tele'a had a mixed 2021 Super Rugby Aotearoa season but returned to form during the Super Rugby Trans-Tasman competition, scoring a try in the final as the Blues defeated the Highlanders 23-15. In Round 3 of the 2021 Bunnings NPC Tele'a suffered a season ending injury while playing for Tasman against Northland. The side went on to make the final before losing 23–20 to Waikato. He was part of the Blues team which won the 2024 Super Rugby Pacific Grand Final.

== International career ==
On 30 June 2022, after an impressive 2022 Super Rugby season with the Blues, Tele'a was called in to the All Blacks squad as a replacement.

On 12 November 2022, he was named at 14 in the starting lineup to go up against Scotland. During his debut match he scored two tries.

Tele'a was a member of the starting lineup for the All Blacks side during the 2023 Rugby World Cup. On 8 September, in the opening game of the World Cup against France, he scored two tries, with the first try of the competition within 91 seconds of the start of the game being the fastest World Cup opening try to date. He was dropped by New Zealand ahead of their quarter-final match against Ireland due to a breach of team protocol. He returned for their semi-final clash against Argentina. He also featured in the final, which the All Blacks narrowly lost to the Springboks by a single point.

Tele'a was awarded World Rugby Men’s 15s Breakthrough Player of the Year at the conclusion of the World Cup.

== Personal life ==
He qualified for three countries as Tele'a’s father is a Xhosa South African while his mother is Samoan.
