= Sione Havili Talitui =

Tonga international rugby union player

- Born: 25 January 1998 (age 28) Nukuʻalofa, Tonga
- Height: 1.87 m (6 ft 2 in)
- Weight: 108 kg (238 lb; 17 st 0 lb)
- School: Auckland Grammar School

Rugby union career
- Position(s): Flanker, Number 8
- Current team: Shimizu Blue Sharks
Senior career
Years	Team	Apps	(Points)
2017	Auckland	2	(5)
2018	Blues	1	(0)
2018–2025	Tasman	52	(50)
2020–2023	Crusaders	35	(30)
2024–2025	Moana Pasifika	16	(10)
2025–	Shimizu Blue Sharks	14	(30)
- Correct as of 11 October 2025
International career
Years	Team	Apps	(Points)
2022–2024	Tonga	17	(0)
- Correct as of 11 October 2025

Sione Havili Talitui (born 25 January 1998) is a Tongan rugby union player who plays as a flanker.

== Early life ==
In 2016 Havili represented the NZ Secondary Schools team, awarded the Golden Boot for the country's best player.

== Club career ==
Havili made his Mitre 10 Cup debut in 2017 for Auckland playing 2 games and scoring a try in the season. He made his debut for the Blues during the 2018 Super Rugby season. He was loaned to Tasman for the 2018 Mitre 10 Cup however his season was cut short by injury, but Tasman coach Andrew Goodman ensured he returned and Havili signed through with the Mako until the end of 2021. He was part of the Tasman Mako team that won the Mitre 10 Cup in 2019 for the first time. Following an outstanding season with Tasman Havili was named in the Crusaders squad for the 2020 Super Rugby season. Havili was again part of the Mako side that won the 2020 Mitre 10 Cup, receiving Mako player of the year, Mako man of the year and defender of the year at the Mako awards. He was part of the Crusaders side that won their fifth Super Rugby title in a row with a 24–13 win over the Chiefs in the 2021 Super Rugby Aotearoa final. In Round 3 of the 2021 Bunnings NPC Havili suffered a season ending injury while playing for Tasman against Northland. The Mako went on to make the premiership final before losing 23–20 to Waikato. In May 2022 he was named in the Tongan national side.
