= Alex Ainley =

NZ rugby union player (born 1981)

- Full name: Alexander Nigel Ainley
- Born: 16 July 1981 (age 45) Auckland, New Zealand
- Height: 1.97 m (6 ft 6 in)
- Weight: 108.5 kg (17 st 1 lb; 239 lb)
- School: Rangitoto College

Rugby union career
- Position: Lock
Senior career
| Years | Team | Apps | (Points) |
| 2006–2009, 2013–2018, 2020 | Tasman | 100 | (45) |
| 2007–2009 | Crociati | 35 | (0) |
| 2010–2012 | Mitsubishi DynaBoars | | |
| 2015−2018 | Highlanders | 40 | (0) |
| 2019 | Bay of Plenty | 8 | (5) |
- Correct as of 8 November 2020

Alexander Nigel Ainley (born 16 July 1981) is a former New Zealand rugby union player who played as a lock for Tasman in the Bunnings NPC and the Highlanders in Super Rugby. He now works as a builder in the city of Nelson, New Zealand. As of 2026, he has appeared in a Scott Brown Carpentry video.

== Senior career ==
Ainley started out his rugby career in 2006 playing for the newly formed Tasman Mako in the ITM Cup and played all 10 of their games during their debut season, featuring exclusively as a flanker. He went on to captain the Mako in 2007 before handing it over to Andrew Goodman the following season.

From 2007 to 2009, Ainley spent his off seasons playing in Europe for Crociati in Parma. 2009 was to be his final campaign in his first spell with Tasman as he headed overseas to take up a contract with Japanese side, the Mitsubishi Dynaboars. He spent 3 seasons playing in the Japanese second division before heading home to New Zealand again in 2013. He was immediately named in the Mako squad for the 2013 ITM Cup and featured in 10 matches as they won promotion to the Premiership. Another impressive season followed in 2014 as the men from Nelson went all the way to the Premiership final before losing 36–32 to Taranaki.

Tasman continued their good form through 2015 and 2016, finishing as losing semi- finalists and runner up respectively. Ainley played 19 times across the 2 seasons and contributed 4 tries including one in the 44–24 defeat to Auckland in the 2015 semi final.

Ainley captained Tasman in 2017 where the Mako went all the way to the final before losing to Canterbury.

Ainley moved to Bay of Plenty for the 2019 Mitre 10 Cup where the Steamers won the Championship with Ainley bringing up his 100th Mitre 10 Cup game in the final against Hawke's Bay.

Ainley returned to the Tasman Mako for the 2020 Mitre 10 Cup and in Round 9 against Canterbury Ainley played his 100th game for the Mako at Lansdowne Park in Blenheim, becoming only the second centurion in the short history of the union. The Mako went on to win their second premiership title in a row.

== Super Rugby ==
Ainley was rewarded for years of hard work and toil when at the age of 33 he was handed his first Super Rugby contract by the Dunedin based Highlanders ahead of the 2015 Super Rugby season. He endured a tough start to his spell with the Highlanders, finding himself as the fourth choice lock for the franchise behind the more established Joe Wheeler, Mark Reddish and Tom Franklin and also broke his jaw playing club rugby early into the season. However, the second half of his first year in Dunedin was far brighter as injuries to the sides senior locks saw Ainley, who himself had just returned to fitness, named in their touring party for the trip to South Africa where he made his Super Rugby debut in a 45–24 victory over the Cheetahs in Bloemfontein. He went on to start 8 games during a historic year which finished with the Highlanders lifting the Super Rugby trophy for the first time in their history, defeating the Hurricanes 21–14 in the final.

Ainley featured 11 times in 2016, however the Highlanders were unable to hold on to their Super Rugby crown, going down 42–30 to the Lions in Johannesburg. Tony Brown replaced the Japan bound Jamie Joseph ahead of the 2017 season and he retained the 35 year old Ainley in the squad for his first campaign in charge.

== Career Honours ==
Tasman

- ITM Cup Championship – 2013
- Mitre 10 Cup – 2020

Highlanders

- Super Rugby – 2015

Bay of Plenty

- Mitre 10 Cup Championship – 2019
