= Gordon Falcon =

NZ rugby union & league footballer

Personal information
- Born: 7 April 1970 (age 54); Gisborne, New Zealand
- Height: 193 cm (6 ft 4 in)
- Weight: 108 kg (17 st 0 lb; 238 lb)

Playing information

Rugby union
- Position: Flanker
Club
Years	Team	Pld	T	G	FG	P
1989–95	Hawke's Bay	71
Representative
Years	Team	Pld	T	G	FG	P
	New Zealand Māori

Rugby league
- Position: Prop, Second-row
Club
Years	Team	Pld	T	G	FG	P
1997–99	Penrith Panthers	22	1	0	0	4

Gordon Falcon is a New Zealand rugby league footballer who played rugby league professionally for the Penrith Panthers and rugby union for the New Zealand Māori and Hawke's Bay.
