= Mitchell Karpik =

New Zealand rugby union player (born 1995)

- Full name: Mitchell Ryan Karpik
- Born: 2 June 1995 (age 31) Auckland, New Zealand
- Height: 185 cm (6 ft 1 in)
- Weight: 101 kg (223 lb; 15 st 13 lb)
- School: King's College

Rugby union career
- Position: Flanker
- Current team: Chiefs, Bay of Plenty
Senior career
| Years | Team | Apps | (Points) |
| 2015 | Auckland | 11 | (15) |
| 2017–2020 | Chiefs | 25 | (15) |
| 2017–2020 | Bay of Plenty | 27 | (30) |
- Correct as of 20 June 2020
International career
| Years | Team | Apps | (Points) |
| 2015 | New Zealand U20 | 4 | (20) |
| 2018–2019 | Māori All Blacks | 5 | (20) |
- Correct as of 20 June 2020

Mitchell "Mitch" Karpik (born 2 June 1995) is a retired New Zealand rugby union player who played as a flanker for Bay of Plenty in New Zealand's domestic Mitre 10 Cup and the Chiefs in the international Super Rugby competition. Karpik became a lawyer after injury cut his rugby career short.

== Early career ==
Born and raised in Auckland, Karpik attended King's College in Otahuhu from 2009-2013, and was captain of the 1st XV. Karpik also grew up playing cricket for the Parnell Pirates and had a reputation as a formidable all rounder. Furthermore, during High School Karpik; along with future agent Scott Bevin, formed the all conquering Greenbank Javelin academy, garnering success for many years. After graduating from high school, he played his club rugby in the Auckland region and played for the Blues under-20 and developmental teams.

== Senior career ==
He received his first taste of provincial rugby with Auckland during the 2015 ITM Cup, where he played a starring role in their run to the Premiership final. He played 11 of Auckland's 12 games during the campaign and scored 3 tries in what was to be his only season with them.

At the conclusion of the 2015 season, it was announced that Karpik would be joining the Bay of Plenty Steamers for 2016. Unfortunately for both parties, a knee injury sustained at the beginning of the year ruled him of the entire campaign which saw the Steamers eliminated at the semi-final stage after finishing 4th on the Championship log.

== Super Rugby ==
His debut season at provincial level with Auckland was enough to convince the Hamilton-based Chiefs Super Rugby franchise to hand him a contract for the 2016 Super Rugby season. A knee injury picked up in pre-season match against the Waratahs saw him miss the entire campaign. Despite this, he was retained in the squad for 2017.

== International ==
Karpik represented both New Zealand Schools and New Zealands Schools Barbarians while at King's College and was also a member of the New Zealand Under-20 side which won the 2015 World Rugby Under 20 Championship in Italy.

== Career Honours ==
New Zealand Under-20

- World Rugby Under 20 Championship - 2015

== Super Rugby Statistics ==
As of 11 December 2016

| Season | Team | Games | Starts | Sub | Mins | Tries | Cons | Pens | Drops | Points | Yel | Red |
|---|---|---|---|---|---|---|---|---|---|---|---|---|
| 2016 | Chiefs | 0 | 0 | 0 | 0 | 0 | 0 | 0 | 0 | 0 | 0 | 0 |
| Total | | 0 | 0 | 0 | 0 | 0 | 0 | 0 | 0 | 0 | 0 | 0 |
