= Mason Emerson =

New Zealand rugby union player

- Born: 27 March 1996 (age 30) Hastings, New Zealand
- Height: 1.74 m (5 ft 9 in)
- Weight: 83 kg (183 lb)
- School: Lindisfarne College

Rugby union career
- Position(s): Wing, fullback
Amateur team(s)
Years	Team	Apps	(Points)
–	Hastings R&S		
Senior career
Years	Team	Apps	(Points)
2020	Colorado Raptors	4	(10)
2021–2023	Valence Romans	34	(60)
Provincial / State sides
Years	Team	Apps	(Points)
2015–2021	Hawke's Bay	48	(60)
International career
Years	Team	Apps	(Points)
2016	New Zealand U20	2	(10)

Mason Emerson (born 27 March 1996) is a New Zealand rugby union player who played as a wing and fullback. He represented Hawke's Bay between 2015 and 2021, making 48 appearances and scoring 60 points.

Emerson joined the Colorado Raptors for the 2020 Major League Rugby season, making four appearances and scoring two tries. He subsequently joined Valence Romans in France in 2021. He made 34 appearances and scored 60 points during two seasons with the club before being listed among its departing players in June 2023.

Emerson represented New Zealand U20 in 2016, making two appearances and scoring two tries. Both tries came in New Zealand's 30–10 victory over Australia during the 2016 Oceania Rugby U20 Championship.
