= Coree Te Whata-Colley =

New Zealand rugby union player

- Born: 13 January 1995 (age 31) New Zealand
- Height: 193 cm (6 ft 4 in)
- Weight: 137 kg (302 lb; 21 st 8 lb)
- School: Wesley College

Rugby union career
- Position: Prop
- Current team: Northland
Senior career
Years	Team	Apps	(Points)
2017–2018	Counties Manukau	20	(0)
2019–	Northland	44	(15)
- Correct as of 17 September 2023

Coree J. W. Te Whata-Colley (born 13 January 1995) is a New Zealand rugby union player who plays for Northland in the Bunnings NPC. His position is prop.
