= Sikeli Nabou =

- Born: 5 March 1988 (age 38) Levuka, Fiji
- Height: 6 ft 6 in (198 cm)
- Weight: 244 lb (111 kg)
- School: Ratu Kadavulevu School

Rugby union career
- Position: Lock
Senior career
Years	Team	Apps	(Points)
2016–19	Biarritz Olympique		
2019–	Soyaux Angoulême		
Provincial / State sides
Years	Team	Apps	(Points)
2009–19	Counties Manukau	62	(40)
International career
Years	Team	Apps	(Points)
2017–18	Fiji	6	(0)

Sikeli Nabou (born 5 March 1988) is a Fijian rugby union player.

== Biography ==
Nabou was born in Levuka and educated at Ratu Kadavulevu School.

=== Rugby career ===
A lock, Nabou made his provincial debut with Counties Manukau in 2009 and scored the winning try in the 2013 Ranfurly Shield win over Hawke's Bay. He has played in France with Biarritz Olympique and Soyaux Angoulême.

Nabou was a member of the Fiji national team in 2017 and 2018, gaining six total caps.

== See also ==
- List of Fiji national rugby union players
