= Jamie Lane =

New Zealand rugby union player

- Born: 20 November 1995 (age 30) New Zealand
- Height: 1.98 m (6 ft 6 in)
- Weight: 113 kg (17.8 st; 249 lb)

Rugby union career
- Position: Lock
Senior career
Years	Team	Apps	(Points)
2017–	Auckland	18	(4)
2022–	Utah Warriors	4	(0)
- Correct as of 19 March 2022

Jamie Lane (born 20 November 1995) is a New Zealand rugby union player, currently playing for the Utah Warriors of Major League Rugby (MLR) and Auckland of the National Provincial Championship. His preferred position is lock.

== Professional career ==
Lane signed for Major League Rugby side Utah Warriors for the 2022 Major League Rugby season. He has also previously played for Auckland since the 2017 Mitre 10 Cup and was named in the squad for the 2021 Bunnings NPC.
