= Alex Nankivell =

New Zealand rugby union player (born 1996)

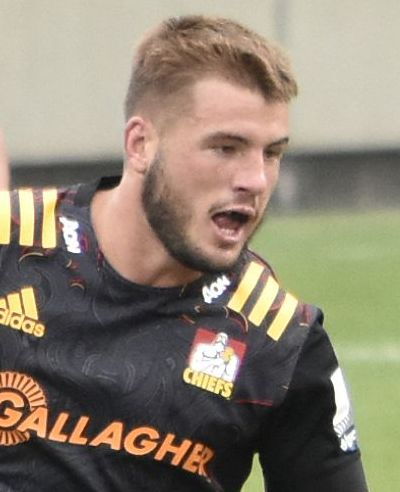
- Nankivell representing the Chiefs during the 2020 Super Rugby season.
- Born: 25 October 1996 (age 30) Auckland, New Zealand
- Height: 1.88 m (6 ft 2 in)
- Weight: 98 kg (15.4 st; 216 lb)
- School: Christchurch Boys' High School

Rugby union career
- Position: Centre
Senior career
Years	Team	Apps	(Points)
2015–2023	Tasman	81	(65)
2017–2023	Chiefs	70	(65)
2023–	Munster	59	(45)
- Correct as of 31 October 2026
International career
Years	Team	Apps	(Points)
2019–2022	Māori All Blacks	5	(5)
2022–2023	All Blacks XV	4	(10)
- Correct as of 23 August 2023

Alex P. Nankivell (born 25 October 1996) is a New Zealand-born rugby union player who plays as a centre for Irish club Munster in the United Rugby Championship.

== Career ==
=== In New Zealand ===
Nankivell made his debut for Tasman during the 2015 ITM Cup against Waikato in a 35–20 win for the Mako. He made his debut for the Chiefs during the 2017 Super Rugby season and was named in the Chiefs squad for the 2018 Super Rugby season. Nankivell's impressive 2019 season caught the eye of the Māori All Blacks selectors and he made his mark on the international stage against Fiji. Nankivell was part of the Tasman side that won the Mitre 10 Cup for the first time in 2019. In round 5 of the 2020 Mitre 10 Cup Nankivell played his 50th game for the Mako against Bay of Plenty at Trafalgar Park in Nelson in a 33–7 win for the side. The Mako went on to win their second premiership title in a row.

Nankivell had a very strong season for the Chiefs in 2021, playing 12 games and scoring 2 tries as the side made the Super Rugby Aotearoa final. He was rewarded at the end of the Super Rugby season as he was named in the Māori All Blacks squad again. Tasman again made the 2021 Bunnings NPC final before losing 23–20 to Waikato. In round 8 of the 2022 Super Rugby Pacific season, Nankivell played his 50th game for the Chiefs against the Blues.

=== Munster ===
Nankivell joined Irish United Rugby Championship club Munster on a two-year contract from the 2023–24 season. He was named on the bench for Munster's opening game against Hollywoodbets Sharks. He was named on the starting team for the next game against Benetton Treviso.

== Personal life ==
Nankivell is a New Zealander of Māori descent (Ngāpuhi descent).
