= Tim O'Malley (rugby union) =

New Zealand rugby union player

- Full name: Timothy Paul O'Malley
- Born: 21 August 1994 (age 32) Paerau, New Zealand
- Height: 186 cm (6 ft 1 in)
- Weight: 96 kg (15 st 2 lb; 212 lb)
- School: St Kevin’s College

Rugby union career
- Position(s): First five-eighth, Centre
Senior career
Years	Team	Apps	(Points)
2016–2021, 2023–2024	Tasman	50	(92)
2019	Utah Warriors	16	(134)
2020	NEC Green Rockets	4	(12)
2021	Highlanders	1	(0)
2021–2022	Zebre	12	(15)
- Correct as of 29 September 2024

Timothy Paul O'Malley (born 21 August 1994) is a New Zealand rugby union player. His position is first five-eighth.

== Career ==
Originally from the small Central Otago town of Paerau, O'Malley attended boarding school at St Kevin's College and later played for Heartland Championship side North Otago in 2012.

He spent three years playing for the Bay of Plenty Academy before moving to Picton at the start of 2016, taking up a job as a rugby development officer for his local club Waitohi as well as playing for the club.

He made his debut for Tasman in 2016 after originally being loaned to Southland, later being recalled to the top of the South. He was part of the Tasman team that won the Mitre 10 Cup for the first time in 2019.

In 2019, O'Malley played for the Utah Warriors in Major League Rugby (MLR), where he was the team's leading scorer. He also had a stint with the NEC Green Rockets.

He signed with the Dallas Jackals for the 2021 Major League Rugby season; however, it was later announced that the side would not be making their debut season in the competition until 2022. O'Malley was again part of the Mako side that won the 2020 Mitre 10 Cup.

In May 2021, O'Malley was called into the Highlanders squad as an injury replacement for the Super Rugby Trans-Tasman competition. He was named on the bench to play the Reds in Round 1 at Forsyth Barr Stadium.

In September 2021, O'Malley cancelled his contract with the Dallas Jackals and signed with Italian side Zebre. He played for the Italian team during the 2021–22 United Rugby Championship season. Tasman again made the 2021 Bunnings NPC final before losing 23–20 to Waikato.

In Round 8 of the 2024 Bunnings NPC O'Malley played his 50th game for Tasman against Otago in Dunedin, starting at number 12 for the Mako.
