= Filipe Rayasi =

Fiji international rugby union player

- Born: 2 October 1969 (age 57)
- Height: 5 ft 11 in (180 cm)
- Weight: 198 lb (90 kg)
- Notable relative: Salesi Rayasi (son)

Rugby union career
- Position: Wing / Centre / Fullback
Provincial / State sides
Years	Team	Apps	(Points)
1991–92	Wellington	10	(8)
1994–96	King Country	26	(50)
Super Rugby
Years	Team	Apps	(Points)
1996	Crusaders	1	(0)
International career
Years	Team	Apps	(Points)
1994–97	Fiji	13	(20)

Filipe Rayasi (born 2 October 1969) is a Fijian former international rugby union player.

== Rugby career ==
Rayasi gained 13 times caps for Fiji, playing mostly fullback. He was used on the wing during his time at Wellington and made a Super 12 appearance for the Crusaders while a King Country player in 1996. His career included several seasons in Japanese professional rugby with the Osaka-based Kintetsu Liners.

== Personal life ==
Rayasi is the father of former Hurricanes, current Bordeaux Beagles player Salesi Rayasi.
