= Salesi Rayasi =

Fiji international rugby union player

- Full name: Salesi Tuivuna Mauri Rayasi
- Born: 25 September 1996 (age 30) Wellington, New Zealand
- Height: 193 cm (6 ft 4 in)
- Weight: 105 kg (231 lb; 16 st 7 lb)
- School: St. Patrick's College Silverstream
- Notable relative(s): Filipe Rayasi (father); Shaun Stevenson (cousin)

Rugby union career
- Position(s): Wing, Fullback
- Current team: Auckland, Hurricanes
Senior career
Years	Team	Apps	(Points)
2016	Wellington	1	(0)
2018–2023	Auckland	52	(200)
2019–2024	Hurricanes	50	(150)
2020	Moana Pasifika	1	(0)
2024–2025	RC Vannes	21	(30)
2025–	Bordeaux Bègles	12	(45)
- Correct as of 10 July 2025
International career
Years	Team	Apps	(Points)
2016	Samoa U20	4	(18)
2025	Fiji	4	(5)
- Correct as of 12 March 2023
National sevens team
Years	Team		Comps
2018–2020	New Zealand		7
- Correct as of 12 March 2023

Salesi Tuivuna Mauri Rayasi (born 25 September 1996 in Wellington) is a New Zealand rugby union player who played on the wing for RC Vannes in the French Top 14, having joined the club in 2024. In July 2025, after Vannes was relegated to ProD2, Rayasi signed for Top 14 giants Bordeaux Bègles

He previously played for the Hurricanes in Super Rugby. He signed for the Hurricanes squad in 2019. He has also played for the New Zealand national rugby sevens team and for Auckland and Wellington in New Zealand's National Provincial Championship.

In June 2025 Salesi was called up to the Fiji squad for the end of season internationals.
