= David Havili =

NZ international rugby union player

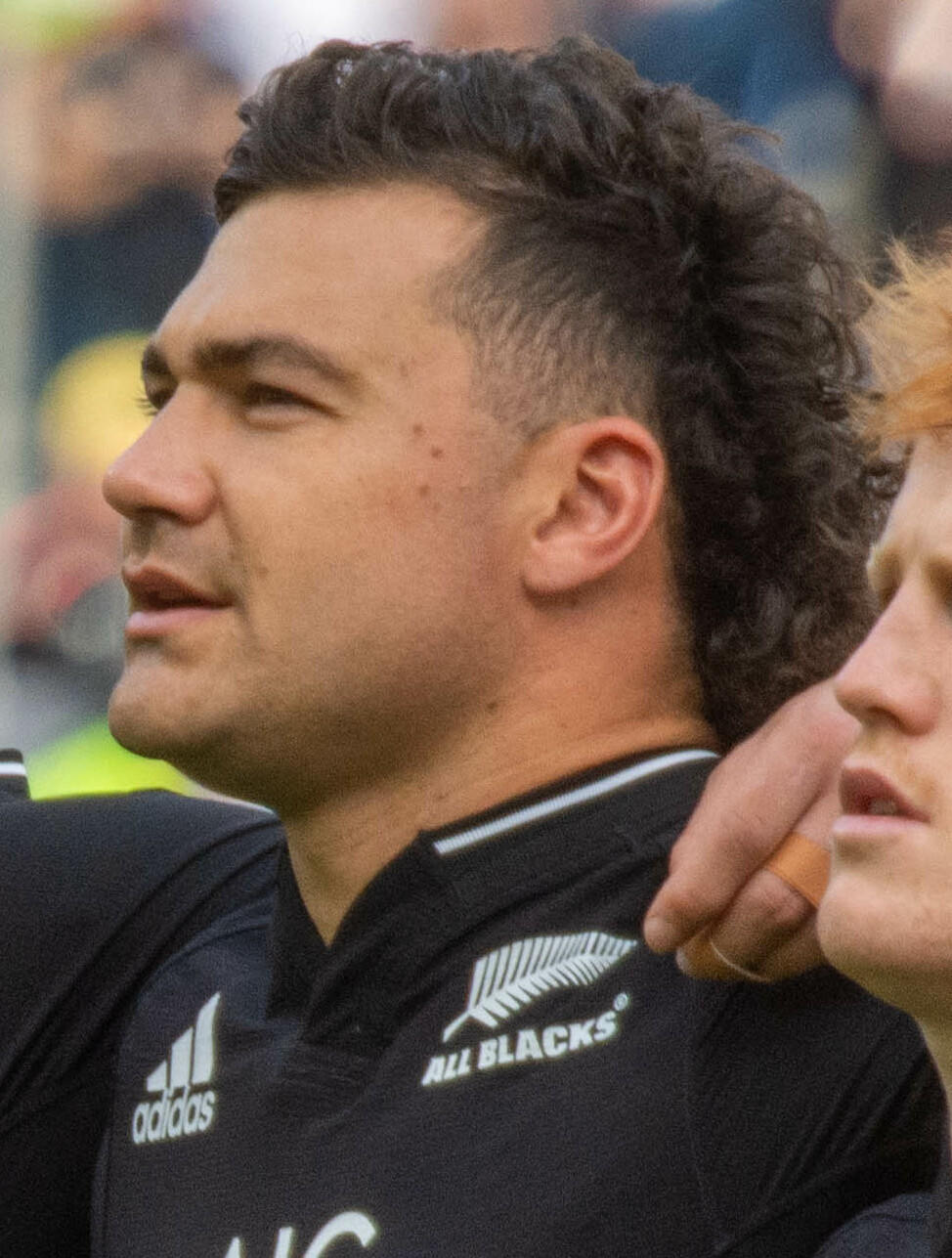
- Havili representing New Zealand during the 2021 November Internationals
- Full name: David Kaetau Havili
- Born: 23 December 1994 (age 31) Nelson, New Zealand
- Height: 1.84 m (6 ft 0 in)
- Weight: 100 kg (220 lb; 15 st 10 lb)
- School: Motueka High School; Nelson College
- Notable relative: William Havili (brother)

Rugby union career
- Position(s): Centre, Fullback
- Current team: Toshiba Brave Lupus
Senior career
Years	Team	Apps	(Points)
2014–2026	Tasman	90	(199)
2015–2026	Crusaders	155	(222)
2026–	Toshiba Brave Lupus		
- Correct as of 9 October 2026
International career
Years	Team	Apps	(Points)
2014	New Zealand U20	1	(0)
2017–2024	New Zealand	30	(45)
2025	ANZAC XV	1	(0)
2025	All Blacks XV	2	(5)
- Correct as of 9 October 2026

David Kaetau Havili (born 23 December 1994) is a New Zealand rugby union player who plays as a centre. He played for Tasman in the Bunnings NPC and the Crusaders in Super Rugby. He also played 32 games for the New Zealand national team, the All Blacks.

== Early life ==
Havili is of Pākeha and Tongan descent and is the son of former Nelson Bays rugby representative Bill Havili. David Havili was born in Nelson in the South Island of New Zealand, but raised in nearby Motueka. He initially attended Motueka High School, but later went to Nelson College, where he was a member of their top side. After finishing school he began working as a builder's apprentice while playing local club rugby for Nelson. During this time, he made his way through Tasman youth structures and was a member of the Crusaders Knights Development team.

== Club career ==
=== Tasman ===
Havili made the Tasman Mako squad for the first time in 2014, and burst onto the scene with four tries in 10 appearances for the Mako as they reached the final of the ITM Cup Premiership before going down 36–32 to Taranaki. He played all 11 games for the Mako in their run to the semi finals in 2015, scoring 31 points in the process. Tasman were again losing finalists in 2016 with Havili playing a key role with two tries in 10 games. During the 2019 season Havili captained Tasman to their first Mitre 10 Cup premiership title, scoring a try in the final win over Wellington. Havili again captained the Mako to their second premiership title in a row in 2020.

=== Super Rugby ===
As a result of his impressive displays in his debut season at provincial level, Havili was named as a member of the Crusaders wider training squad for the 2015 Super Rugby season. Somewhat surprisingly, he featured 11 times in his first season in Christchurch and helped himself to two tries which saw him promoted to the full squad for 2016. He made 14 appearances in 2016 and contributed two tries as the Crusaders reached the competition's quarter finals before going down 42–25 to the Lions in Johannesburg. In October 2016, it was announced that he had signed a new three-year deal which would see him stay with the Crusaders through to the end of the 2019 season.

Havili started at centre against the touring British and Irish Lions in 2017, slotting into the place of the injured Ryan Crotty. Havili played the full 80 minutes as the Crusaders lost to the Lions 3–12.

In the 2017 Super Rugby season, Havili was a key member of the Crusaders squad that lost only one match on the way to their eighth Super Rugby title. Havili was one of the Crusaders stand out performers in the 2017 season, not only displacing All Blacks 60 plus test veteran Israel Dagg from the fullback position, causing Dagg to be shifted to the right wing upon his return from a knee injury, but was also voted the Crusaders Player of the Year for 2017. Havili was one of the leading try scorers of the 2017 Super Rugby season, finishing with eight tries. Winger Seta Tamanivalu was the only Crusader to score more tries than Havili, scoring 10.

Havili again played a crucial part in the Crusaders title wins in 2018 and 2019.

Havili played most of the 2021 Super Rugby Aotearoa season at centre and starred as the Crusaders won their fifth title in a row with Havili playing every minute in a 24–13 win over the Chiefs in the final.

In Round 6 of the 2022 Super Rugby Pacific season, Havili played his 100th game for the Crusaders against the Chiefs, the Crusaders coming away with a 19–34 win. Havili had a stand out performance in the final against the Blues as the Crusaders made it six in a row with a 7–21 win.

== International career ==
Havili was a member of the New Zealand Under 20 side that finished third in the 2014 IRB Junior World Championship in his home country. He was not named in the initial squad, but was later called up to replace the injured Simon Hickey.

Havili was called up to the All Blacks for the 2017 Rugby Championship squad after shoulder surgery ruled out Hurricanes back Jordie Barrett for the rest of the year.

Havili made his All Blacks debut against the Pumas on 1 October 2017 at José Amalfitani Stadium in Buenos Aires, replacing in form winger Rieko Ioane with only 10 minutes left of the match. Despite only 10 minutes of game time Havili scored a try in the last minute of the test, allowing the All Blacks to beat Los Pumas 39–22. His standout performance against Argentina saw him named on the bench the following week against South Africa where he replaced the injured Nehe Milner-Skudder shortly before half time. Havili was the best performing substitute off the bench in that fixture, setting up Damian McKenzie's try to make the score a 25–24 win over the Springboks for New Zealand.

Havili played in three games on the 2017 end of year tour, the first of which was a quiet performance in a 23–18 loss to the Wallabies where he replaced Lima Sopoaga off the bench. Havili earned his first start for the All Blacks on 5 November 2017 in a 31–22 win over the Barbarians where he was replaced by Sopoaga in the 46th minute. Havili also started for the All Blacks ten days later in a 28–23 win over a French side where he produced a good performance and was not subbed off.

Havili was not part of the side in 2018, 2019 and 2020 but after an outstanding season playing in the midfield for the Crusaders during the 2021 Super Rugby season he was named in the All Blacks squad to play Tonga and Fiji in the July Steinlager Series. He made his return against Fiji at Forsyth Barr Stadium, starting in the number 12 jersey in a 57–23 win for the All Blacks. He had a mixed game, scoring two brilliant tries but later being yellow carded.

Havili became the first choice at 12 during the Ian Foster era, playing 22 test matches from 2021 to 2022; mostly in combination with Rieko Ioane at 13. A key moment in Havili's run of game time was a crucial try against South Africa on 13 August 2022, which played a part in ending an unprecedented losing streak for the All Blacks; with the final score ending as a 35–23 win.

Having missed much of the 2023 Super Rugby season, he played just two test matches in 2023; both being during the 2023 Rugby World Cup. Havili came off the bench as a replacement during the team's tournament opener against France, while he scored his ninth test try against Namibia.

== Career statistics ==
=== List of international tries ===
As of 6 February 2024

Try	Opposing team	Location	Venue	Competition	Date	Result	Score
1	Argentina	Buenos Aires, Argentina	Millennium Stadium	2017 Rugby Championship	30 September 2017	Win	10 – 36
2	Fiji	Dunedin, New Zealand	Forsyth Barr Stadium	2021 July rugby union tests	10 July 2021	Win	57 – 23
3	Fiji	Dunedin, New Zealand	Forsyth Barr Stadium	2021 July rugby union tests	10 July 2021	Win	57 – 23
4	Australia	Auckland, New Zealand	Eden Park	2021 July rugby union tests	7 August 2021	Win	33 – 25
5	Australia	Auckland, New Zealand	Eden Park	2021 Rugby Championship	14 August 2021	Win	57 – 22
6	Australia	Perth, Australia	Optus Stadium	2021 Rugby Championship	5 September 2021	Win	21 – 38
7	Australia	Perth, Australia	Optus Stadium	2021 Rugby Championship	5 September 2021	Win	21 – 38
8	South Africa	Johannesburg, South Africa	Ellis Park Stadium	2022 Rugby Championship	13 August 2022	Win	23 – 35
9	Namibia	Toulouse, France	Stadium de Toulouse	2023 Rugby World Cup	15 September 2023	Win	71 - 3
