= 2020 North vs South rugby union match =

- Event: North vs South rugby union match
North Island	South Island
(New Zealand)	(New Zealand)
35	38
- Date: 5 September 2020
- Venue: Sky Stadium, Wellington
- Referee: Paul Williams

On 5 September 2020, was a rugby union match played between provinces on the North Island and the South Island of New Zealand. It was the eighty-first game between the islands and was the second one-off game after the fundraiser for the Otago Rugby Football Union in 2012 which the South won 32–24 at Forsyth Barr Stadium in Dunedin. The game along with Super Rugby Aotearoa supplants the 2020 Super Rugby season, which was suspended in March due to the COVID-19 pandemic.

The second one-off was first considered by new All Blacks head coach Ian Foster on 4 June. On 30 June was then confirmed to be played at Eden Park on 29 August. The teams were coached by assistant coaches John Plumtree and Scott McLeod for the North, and Greg Feek and Brad Mooar for the South.

On 21 August, the match was postponed to 5 September and was reschedule to be played at Sky Stadium when the country moved back to level 2 and Auckland moved back to level 3.

== Squads ==
=== North ===
Player	Position	Date of birth (age)	Franchise / province
Asafo Aumua	Hooker	5 March 1997 (aged 23)	Hurricanes / Wellington
Ash Dixon	Hooker	1 September 1988 (aged 32)	Highlanders / Hawke's Bay
Kurt Eklund	Hooker	9 January 1992 (aged 28)	Blues / Bay of Plenty
Alex Fidow	Prop	19 August 1997 (aged 23)	Hurricanes / Wellington
Ayden Johnstone	Prop	24 August 1996 (aged 24)	Highlanders / Waikato
Angus Ta'avao	Prop	22 March 1990 (aged 30)	Blues / Bay of Plenty
Karl Tu'inukuafe	Prop	21 February 1993 (aged 27)	Blues / North Harbour
Ofa Tu'ungafasi	Prop	19 April 1992 (aged 28)	Blues / Auckland
Scott Scrafton	Lock	18 April 1993 (aged 27)	Hurricanes / Auckland
Patrick Tuipulotu (c)	Lock	23 January 1993 (aged 27)	Blues / Auckland
Tupou Vaa'i	Lock	27 January 2000 (aged 20)	Chiefs / Taranaki
Lachlan Boshier	Back row	16 November 1994 (aged 25)	Chiefs / Taranaki
Akira Ioane	Back row	16 June 1995 (aged 25)	Blues / Auckland
Dalton Papalii	Back row	11 October 1997 (aged 22)	Highlanders / Counties Manukau
Ardie Savea	Back row	11 October 1997 (aged 22)	Hurricanes / Wellington
Hoskins Sotutu	Back row	12 July 1998 (aged 22)	Blues / Auckland
TJ Perenara	Scrum-half	23 January 1992 (aged 28)	Hurricanes / Wellington
Aaron Smith	Scrum-half	21 November 1988 (aged 31)	Highlanders / Manawatu
Te Toiroa Tahuriorangi	Scrum-half	31 March 1995 (aged 25)	Chiefs / Bay of Plenty
Beauden Barrett	Fly-half	27 May 1991 (aged 29)	Blues/Suntory Sungoliath / Taranaki
Rieko Ioane	Centre	18 March 1997 (aged 23)	Blues / Auckland
Anton Lienert-Brown	Centre	15 August 1995 (aged 25)	Chiefs / Waikato
Peter Umaga-Jensen	Centre	31 December 1997 (aged 22)	Hurricanes / Wellington
Caleb Clarke	Wing	21 March 1999 (aged 21)	Blues / Auckland
Sevu Reece	Wing	13 February 1997 (aged 23)	Crusaders / Waikato
Mark Tele'a	Wing	6 December 1996 (aged 23)	Blues / Tasman
Mitchell Hunt	Fullback	19 June 1995 (aged 25)	Highlanders / Tasman
Damian McKenzie	Fullback	20 May 1995 (aged 25)	Chiefs / Waikato

=== South ===
Player	Position	Date of birth (age)	Franchise / province
Liam Coltman	Hooker	25 January 1990 (aged 30)	Highlanders / Otago
Andrew Makalio	Hooker	22 January 1992 (aged 28)	Crusaders / Tasman
Codie Taylor	Hooker	31 March 1991 (aged 29)	Crusaders / Canterbury
George Bower	Prop	28 May 1992 (aged 28)	Crusaders / Otago
Alex Hodgman	Prop	16 July 1993 (aged 27)	Blues / Auckland
Nepo Laulala	Prop	6 November 1991 (aged 28)	Chiefs / Counties Manukau
Tyrel Lomax	Prop	16 March 1996 (aged 24)	Hurricanes / Tasman
Joe Moody	Prop	18 September 1988 (aged 31)	Crusaders / Canterbury
Mitchell Dunshea	Lock	18 November 1995 (aged 24)	Crusaders / Canterbury
Manaaki Selby-Rickit	Lock	5 June 1996 (aged 24)	Highlanders / Southland
Sam Whitelock (c)	Lock	12 October 1988 (aged 31)	Crusaders
Tom Christie	Back row	4 March 1998 (aged 22)	Crusaders / Canterbury
Shannon Frizell	Back row	11 February 1994 (aged 26)	Highlanders / Tasman
Dillon Hunt	Back row	23 February 1995 (aged 25)	Blues / North Harbour
Reed Prinsep	Back row	17 February 1993 (aged 27)	Hurricanes / Canterbury
Tom Sanders	Back row	5 February 1994 (aged 26)	Crusaders / Canterbury
Finlay Christie	Scrum-half	19 September 1995 (aged 24)	Blues / Tasman
Mitchell Drummond	Scrum-half	15 February 1994 (aged 26)	Crusaders / Canterbury
Brad Weber	Scrum-half	17 January 1991 (aged 29)	Chiefs / Hawke's Bay
Josh Ioane	Fly-half	11 July 1995 (aged 25)	Highlanders / Otago
Richie Mo'unga	Fly-half	25 May 1994 (aged 26)	Crusaders / Canterbury
Braydon Ennor	Centre	16 July 1997 (aged 23)	Crusaders / Canterbury
Leicester Fainga'anuku	Centre	11 October 1999 (aged 20)	Crusaders / Tasman
Jack Goodhue	Centre	13 June 1995 (aged 25)	Crusaders / Canterbury
Sio Tomkinson	Centre	27 May 1996 (aged 24)	Highlanders / Otago
Jordie Barrett	Fullback	17 February 1997 (aged 23)	Hurricanes / Taranaki
George Bridge	Wing	1 April 1995 (aged 25)	Crusaders / Canterbury
Will Jordan	Wing	24 February 1998 (aged 22)	Crusaders / Tasman

== Match details ==
5 September 2020
19:10 NZST (UTC+12)

North Island	35–38	South Island
Try: R. Ioane (2) 3' c, 67' c McKenzie 18' c Smith 46' c A. Dixon 72' c Con: McKenzie (5/5) 4', 19', 47', 67', 73'	Report	Try: Laulala 7' c J. Barrett 31' c Jordan (2) 58' c, 80' +5 c Lomax 62' c Con: J. Barrett (5/5) 8', 32', 59', 63', 80' +6; Pen: J. Barrett (1/2) 12'

Sky Stadium, Wellington
Referee: Paul Williams

North	South

FB	15	Damian McKenzie
RW	14	Sevu Reece	(substituted off) 63'
OC	13	Rieko Ioane
IC	12	Anton Lienert-Brown
LW	11	Caleb Clarke
FH	10	Beauden Barrett	(substituted off) 60'
SH	9	TJ Perenara	(substituted off) 40'
N8	8	Hoskins Sotutu	(substituted off) 63'
OF	7	Ardie Savea
BF	6	Akira Ioane
RL	5	Tupou Vaa'i	(substituted off) 50'
LL	4	Patrick Tuipulotu (c)
TP	3	Ofa Tu'ungafasi	(substituted off) 50'
HK	2	Asafo Aumua	(substituted off) 60'
LP	1	Karl Tu'inukuafe	(substituted off) 50'
Replacements:
HK	16	Ash Dixon	(substituted in) 60'
PR	17	Ayden Johnstone	(substituted in) 50'
PR	18	Angus Ta'avao	(substituted in) 50'
LK	19	Scott Scrafton	(substituted in) 50'
FL	20	Dalton Papalii	(substituted in) 63'
SH	21	Aaron Smith	(substituted in) 40'
CE	22	Peter Umaga-Jensen	(substituted in) 63'
FB	23	Mitchell Hunt	(substituted in) 60'
Coach:
John Plumtree; Scott McLeod

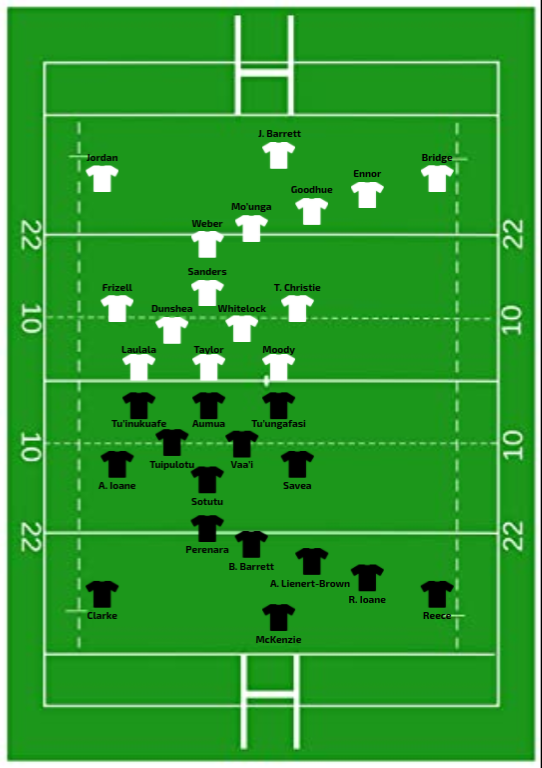

FB	15	Jordie Barrett
RW	14	Will Jordan
OC	13	Braydon Ennor	(substituted off) 14'
IC	12	Jack Goodhue
LW	11	George Bridge
FH	10	Richie Mo'unga	(substituted off) 29'	(substituted in) 40'	(substituted off) 70'
SH	9	Brad Weber	(substituted off) 63'
N8	8	Tom Sanders
OF	7	Tom Christie	(substituted off) 60'
BF	6	Shannon Frizell
RL	5	Mitchell Dunshea	(substituted off) 68'
LL	4	Sam Whitelock (c)
TP	3	Nepo Laulala	(substituted off) 51'
HK	2	Codie Taylor	(substituted off) 51'
LP	1	Joe Moody	(substituted off) 51'
Replacements:
HK	16	Liam Coltman	(substituted in) 51'
PR	17	George Bower	(substituted in) 51'
PR	18	Tyrel Lomax	(substituted in) 51'
LK	19	Manaaki Selby-Rickit	(substituted in) 68'
N8	20	Dillon Hunt	(substituted in) 60'
SH	21	Finlay Christie	(substituted in) 63'
CE	22	Josh Ioane	(substituted in) 29'	(substituted off) 40'	(substituted in) 70'
FB	23	Leicester Fainga'anuku	(substituted in) 14'
Coach:
Greg Feek; Brad Mooar

== See also ==
- North vs South rugby union match
- Super Rugby Aotearoa
