= 2023 Rugby Championship =

Rugby Championship season

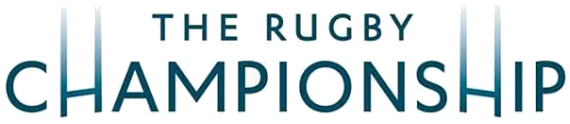
- Date: 8 July – 29 July 2023
- Countries: Argentina; Australia; New Zealand; South Africa

Final positions
- Champions: New Zealand (20th title)
- Bledisloe Cup: New Zealand
- Freedom Cup: New Zealand
- Mandela Challenge Plate: South Africa
- Puma Trophy: Argentina

Tournament statistics
- Matches played: 6
- Tries scored: 44 (7.33 per match)
- Attendance: 278,298 (46,383 per match)
- Top scorer(s): (New Zealand) Richie Mo'unga (28)
- Most tries: (South Africa) Kurt-Lee Arendse (3)

The 2023 Rugby Championship was the eleventh edition of the annual southern hemisphere competition, involving Argentina, Australia, New Zealand and South Africa.

The competition was operated by SANZAAR, a joint venture of the four countries' national unions, and known for sponsorship reasons as The Castle Rugby Championship in South Africa, The Lipovitan-D Rugby Championship in New Zealand, The eToro Rugby Championship in Australia, and The Zurich Rugby Championship in Argentina.

As in previous Rugby World Cup years, the tournament was reduced, with each nation only playing each other once as part of the Championship.

New Zealand retained the title, the 20th time they won the title.

== Table ==
Pos	Team	Pld	W	D	L	PF	PA	PD	TF	TA	TB	LB	Pts
1	New Zealand	3	3	0	0	114	39	+75	17	6	2	0	14
2	South Africa	3	2	0	1	85	68	+17	12	8	1	0	9
3	Argentina	3	1	0	2	67	94	−27	8	14	0	1	5
4	Australia	3	0	0	3	50	115	−65	7	16	0	1	1

Source: RugbyPass

== Fixtures ==
=== Round 1 ===
8 July 2023
17:05 SAST (UTC+2)

(1 BP) South Africa	43–12	Australia
Try: Arendse (3) 15' c, 29' c, 50' m Penalty try (2) 53', 68'; P. du Toit 74' c Con: Libbok (3/4) 16', 30', 75'; Pen: Libbok (1/2) 13'	Report	Try: Koroibete 7' m Gordon 80+1'; Con: Gordon (1/1) 80+s'

Loftus Versfeld Stadium, Pretoria
Attendance: 50,089
Referee: Ben O'Keeffe (New Zealand)

FB	15	Willie le Roux	(substituted off) 68'
RW	14	Canan Moodie
OC	13	Lukhanyo Am
IC	12	André Esterhuizen
LW	11	Kurt-Lee Arendse
FH	10	Manie Libbok
SH	9	Cobus Reinach	(substituted off) 65'
N8	8	Duane Vermeulen (c)
BF	7	Pieter-Steph du Toit
OF	6	Marco van Staden	(substituted off) 65'
RL	5	Marvin Orie	(substituted off) 53'
LL	4	Jean Kleyn	(substituted off) 68'
TP	3	Frans Malherbe	(substituted off) 62'
HK	2	Bongi Mbonambi	(substituted off) 62'
LP	1	Steven Kitshoff	(substituted off) 62'
Replacements:
HK	16	Joseph Dweba	(substituted on) 62'
PR	17	Thomas du Toit	(substituted on) 62'
PR	18	Vincent Koch	(substituted on) 62'
LK	19	RG Snyman	(substituted on) 53'
LK	20	Evan Roos	(substituted on) 68'
FL	21	Deon Fourie	(substituted on) 65'
SH	22	Grant Williams	(substituted on) 65'
FH	23	Damian Willemse	(substituted on) 68'
Coach:
(South Africa) Jacques Nienaber

FB	15	Tom Wright
RW	14	Suliasi Vunivalu	(yellow card) 68'
OC	13	Len Ikitau
IC	12	Reece Hodge		(substituted off) 51'
LW	11	Marika Koroibete
FH	10	Quade Cooper		(substituted off) 68'
SH	9	Nic White		(substituted off) 58'
N8	8	Rob Valetini
OF	7	Michael Hooper (cc)
BF	6	Tom Hooper		(substituted off) 31'
RL	5	Will Skelton		(substituted off) 51'
LL	4	Nick Frost
TP	3	Allan Alaalatoa		(substituted off) 64'
HK	2	Dave Porecki	(yellow card) 53'			(substituted off) 64'
LP	1	James Slipper (cc)		(substituted off) 64'
Replacements:
HK	16	Jordan Uelese			(substituted on) 55'
PR	17	Matt Gibbon		(substituted on) 64'
PR	18	Zane Nonggorr		(substituted on) 64'
LK	19	Richie Arnold		(substituted on) 51'
FL	20	Pete Samu		(substituted on) 31'	(substituted off) 55'	(substituted on) 64'
SH	21	Tate McDermott		(substituted on) 58'
CE	22	Samu Kerevi		(substituted on) 51'
FH	23	Carter Gordon		(substituted on) 68'
Coach:
(Australia) Eddie Jones

Player of the Match:
Kurt-Lee Arendse (South Africa)

Assistant referees:
Paul Williams (New Zealand)
Andrea Piardi (Italy)
Television match official:
Brendon Pickerill (New Zealand)
Foul play review officer:
Joy Neville (Ireland)

Notes:

- Ox Nché (South Africa) had been named to start but later withdrew due to injury and was replaced by Steven Kitshoff.
- Jean Kleyn (South Africa), Richie Arnold, Carter Gordon, Tom Hooper and Zane Nonggorr (all Australia) made their international debuts.
- South African reclaim the Mandela Challenge Plate.

8 July 2023
16:10 AST (UTC−3)

Argentina	12–41	New Zealand (1 BP)
Try: Sordoni 51' m Creevy 80' c Con: Boffelli (1/2) 80+1'	Report	Try: Coles 4' m Savea 8' m J. Barrett 11' c Ioane 28' c Smith 38' c B. Barrett 56' m Narawa 75' m Con: McKenzie (3/7) 12', 29', 39'

Estadio Malvinas Argentinas, Mendoza
Attendance: 40,000
Referee: Angus Gardner (Australia)

FB	15	Emiliano Boffelli
RW	14	Sebastián Cancelliere		(substituted off) 53'
OC	13	Matías Moroni		(substituted off) 53'
IC	12	Lucio Cinti
LW	11	Mateo Carreras
FH	10	Santiago Carreras
SH	9	Gonzalo Bertranou		(substituted off) 64'
N8	8	Rodrigo Bruni	(yellow card) 38'
OF	7	Juan Martín González		(substituted off) 60'
BF	6	Pablo Matera
RL	5	Tomás Lavanini		(substituted off) 61'
LL	4	Matías Alemanno
TP	3	Lucio Sordoni		(substituted off) 64'
HK	2	Julián Montoya (c)		(substituted off) 68'
LP	1	Thomas Gallo		(substituted off) 64'
Replacements:
HK	16	Agustin Creevy		(substituted on) 68'
PR	17	Mayco Vivas		(substituted on) 64'
PR	18	Eduardo Bello		(substituted on) 64'
FL	19	Pedro Rubiolo		(substituted on) 61'
FL	20	Santiago Grondona		(substituted on) 60'
SH	21	Lautaro Bazán		(substituted on) 64'
FH	22	Nicolás Sánchez		(substituted on) 53'
CE	23	Matías Orlando		(substituted on) 53'
Coach:
(Australia) Michael Cheika

FB	15	Beauden Barrett	(substituted off) 60'
RW	14	Emoni Narawa
OC	13	Rieko Ioane	(substituted off) 68'
IC	12	Jordie Barrett
LW	11	Caleb Clarke
FH	10	Damian McKenzie
SH	9	Aaron Smith	(substituted off) 60'
N8	8	Ardie Savea
OF	7	Sam Cane (c)
BF	6	Shannon Frizell	(substituted off) 66'
RL	5	Josh Lord	(substituted off) 53'
LL	4	Scott Barrett
TP	3	Tyrel Lomax	(substituted off) 60'
HK	2	Dane Coles	(substituted off) 46'
LP	1	Ethan de Groot	(substituted off) 53'
Replacements:
HK	16	Codie Taylor	(substituted on) 46'
PR	17	Ofa Tu'ungafasi	(substituted on) 53'
PR	18	Nepo Laulala	(substituted on) 60'
LK	19	Tupou Vaa'i	(substituted on) 53'
FL	20	Dalton Papalii	(substituted on) 66'
SH	21	Finlay Christie	(substituted on) 60'
FH	22	Richie Mo'unga	(substituted on) 60'
CE	23	Braydon Ennor	(substituted on) 68'
Coach:
(New Zealand) Ian Foster

Player of the Match:
Jordie Barrett (New Zealand)

Assistant referees:
Nic Berry (Australia)
Jordan Way (Australia)
Television match official:
Brett Cronan (Australia)
Foul play review officer:
Ben Whitehouse (Wales)

Notes:

- Bautista Delguy (Argentina) had been named to start but withdrew ahead of the game due to injury and was replaced by Sebastián Cancelliere.
- Gonzalo Bertranou (Argentina) earned his 50th test cap.
- Emoni Narawa (New Zealand) made his international debut.

=== Round 2 ===
15 July 2023
19:05 NZST (UTC+12)

New Zealand	35–20	South Africa
Try: Smith 4' c Frizell 14' c Jordan 68' c Mo'unga 76' m Con: Mo'unga (3/4) 5', 16', 69'; Pen: Mo'unga (3/3) 9', 37', 59'	Report	Try: Marx 52' c Kolbe 61' m Smith 79' m Con: Kolbe (1/2) 54'; Pen: De Klerk (1/1) 35'

Mount Smart Stadium, Auckland
Attendance: 31,265
Referee: Mathieu Raynal (France)

FB	15	Beauden Barrett
RW	14	Will Jordan
OC	13	Rieko Ioane	(substituted off) 66'
IC	12	Jordie Barrett
LW	11	Mark Tele'a	(substituted off) 71'
FH	10	Richie Mo'unga
SH	9	Aaron Smith	(substituted off) 59'
N8	8	Ardie Savea
OF	7	Sam Cane (c)	(substituted off) 40'
BF	6	Shannon Frizell	(substituted off) 71'
RL	5	Scott Barrett
LL	4	Brodie Retallick
TP	3	Tyrel Lomax	(substituted off) 54'
HK	2	Codie Taylor	(substituted off) 54'
LP	1	Ethan de Groot	(substituted off) 59'
Replacements:
HK	16	Samisoni Taukei'aho	(substituted on) 54'
PR	17	Tamaiti Williams	(substituted on) 59'
PR	18	Nepo Laulala	(substituted on) 54'
LK	19	Tupou Vaa'i	(substituted on) 71'
FL	20	Dalton Papalii	(substituted on) 40'
SH	21	Finlay Christie	(substituted on) 59'
CE	22	Braydon Ennor	(substituted on) 66'
WG	23	Caleb Clarke	(substituted on) 71'
Coach:
(New Zealand) Ian Foster

FB	15	Willie le Roux
RW	14	Cheslin Kolbe
OC	13	Lukhanyo Am
IC	12	Damian de Allende
LW	11	Makazole Mapimpi	(substituted off) 62'
FH	10	Damian Willemse
SH	9	Faf de Klerk	(substituted off) 51'
N8	8	Jasper Wiese	(substituted off) 46'
BF	7	Franco Mostert	(substituted off) 44'
OF	6	Kwagga Smith
RL	5	Lood de Jager	(substituted off) 43'
LL	4	Eben Etzebeth (c)
TP	3	Frans Malherbe	(substituted off) 59'
HK	2	Bongi Mbonambi	(substituted off) 43'
LP	1	Steven Kitshoff	(substituted off) 59'
Replacements:
HK	16	Malcolm Marx	(substituted on) 43'
PR	17	Thomas du Toit	(substituted on) 59'
PR	18	Vincent Koch	(substituted on) 59'
LK	19	RG Snyman	(substituted on) 43'
FL	20	Pieter-Steph du Toit	(substituted on) 44'
N8	21	Duane Vermeulen	(substituted on) 46'
SH	22	Grant Williams	(substituted on) 51'
FH	23	Manie Libbok	(substituted on) 62'
Coach:
(South Africa) Jacques Nienaber

Player of the Match:
Richie Mo'unga (New Zealand)

Assistant referees:
Angus Gardner (Australia)
Pierre Brousset (France)
Television match official:
Ben Whitehouse (Wales)
Foul play review officer:
Brett Cronan (Australia)

Notes:

- Tamaiti Williams (New Zealand) made his international debut.
- Jordie Barrett (New Zealand) earned his 50th test cap.
- New Zealand retained the Freedom Cup.

15 July 2023
19:45 AEST (UTC+10)

(1 BP) Australia	31–34	Argentina
Try: Ikitau 4' c White 52' c Kerevi 71' c Nawaqanitawase 75' c Con: Cooper (4/4) 6', 53', 72', 76'; Pen: Cooper (1/1) 11'	Report	Try: De la Fuente 24' c Montoya 45' c M. Carreras 68' c González 78' c Con: Boffelli (4/4) 26', 45', 69', 80'; Pen: Boffelli (2/3) 20', 59'

Western Sydney Stadium, Sydney
Attendance: 28,000
Referee: Jaco Peyper (South Africa)

FB	15	Tom Wright
RW	14	Mark Nawaqanitawase
OC	13	Len Ikitau		(substituted off) 17'
IC	12	Samu Kerevi
LW	11	Marika Koroibete
FH	10	Quade Cooper
SH	9	Nic White		(substituted off) 65'
N8	8	Rob Valetini
OF	7	Fraser McReight		(substituted off) 65'
BF	6	Jed Holloway		(substituted off) 54'
RL	5	Will Skelton		(substituted off) 54'
LL	4	Richie Arnold	(yellow card) 38'
TP	3	Allan Alaalatoa		(substituted off) 72'
HK	2	Dave Porecki		(substituted off) 69'
LP	1	James Slipper (c)		(substituted off) 63'
Replacements:
HK	16	Jordan Uelese		(substituted on) 69'
PR	17	Angus Bell		(substituted on) 63'
PR	18	Pone Fa'amausili		(substituted on) 72'
LK	19	Matt Philip		(substituted on) 54'
FL	20	Rob Leota		(substituted on) 54'
FL	21	Josh Kemeny		(substituted on) 65'
SH	22	Tate McDermott		(substituted on) 65'
FH	23	Carter Gordon		(substituted on) 17'
Coach:
(Australia) Eddie Jones

FB	15	Emiliano Boffelli
RW	14	Rodrigo Isgro	(substituted off) 72'
OC	13	Lucio Cinti
IC	12	Jeronimo de la Fuente	(substituted off) 54'
LW	11	Mateo Carreras
FH	10	Santiago Carreras
SH	9	Gonzalo Bertranou
N8	8	Juan Martín González
OF	7	Santiago Grondona	(substituted off) 72'
BF	6	Pablo Matera
RL	5	Tomás Lavanini
LL	4	Matías Alemanno	(substituted off) 42'
TP	3	Francisco Gómez Kodela	(substituted off) 50'
HK	2	Julián Montoya (c)	(substituted off) 72'
LP	1	Thomas Gallo	(substituted off) 67'
Replacements:
HK	16	Agustin Creevy	(substituted on) 72'
PR	17	Nahuel Tetaz Chaparro	(substituted on) 67'
PR	18	Eduardo Bello	(substituted on) 50'
FL	19	Lucas Paulos	(substituted on) 42'
FL	20	Rodrigo Bruni	(substituted on) 72'
SH	21	Lautaro Bazán
FH	22	Nicolás Sánchez	(substituted on) 72'
CE	23	Matías Moroni	(substituted on) 54'
Coach:
(Australia) Michael Cheika

Player of the Match:
Mark Nawaqanitawase (Australia)

Assistant referees:
Paul Williams (New Zealand)
James Doleman (New Zealand)
Television match official:
Marius Jonker (South Africa)
Foul play review officer:
Brendon Pickerill (New Zealand)

Notes:

- Josh Kemeny (Australia) and Rodrigo Isgro (Argentina) made their international debut.
- This was Argentina's first win over Australia in Australia since winning 23–19 in 2018.
- Argentina claimed the Puma Trophy for the first time.
- Argentina won back-to-back matches against Australia for the first time.

=== Round 3 ===
29 July 2023
19:45 AEST (UTC+10)

Australia	7–38	New Zealand (1 BP)
Try: Valetini 6' c Con: Gordon (1/1) 7'	Report	Try: Frizell 2' m Taylor 33' c Jordan 40+1' c Clarke 58' c Tele'a 64' m Ioane 66' c Con: Mo'unga (4/6) 34', 40+2', 60', 67'

Melbourne Cricket Ground, Melbourne
Attendance: 83,944
Referee: Wayne Barnes (England)

FB	15	Andrew Kellaway
RW	14	Mark Nawaqanitawase
OC	13	Jordan Petaia		(substituted off) 67'
IC	12	Samu Kerevi
LW	11	Marika Koroibete	(yellow card) 25'
FH	10	Carter Gordon		(substituted off) 49'
SH	9	Tate McDermott		(substituted off) 50'
N8	8	Rob Valetini
OF	7	Tom Hooper			(substituted off) 62'	(substituted on) 68'
BF	6	Jed Holloway		(substituted off) 47'
RL	5	Will Skelton		(substituted off) 47'
LL	4	Nick Frost
TP	3	Allan Alaalatoa (c)		(substituted off) 37'
HK	2	Dave Porecki		(substituted off) 47'
LP	1	Angus Bell		(substituted off) 47'	(substituted on) 62'
Replacements:
HK	16	Jordan Uelese		(substituted on) 47'
PR	17	James Slipper		(substituted on) 47'
PR	18	Taniela Tupou	(yellow card) 57'	(substituted on) 37'		(substituted off) 68'
LK	19	Richie Arnold		(substituted on) 47'
FL	20	Rob Leota		(substituted on) 47'
SH	21	Nic White		(substituted on) 50'
FH	22	Quade Cooper		(substituted on) 49'
CE	23	Izaia Perese		(substituted on) 67'
Coach:
(Australia) Eddie Jones

FB	15	Beauden Barrett	(substituted off) 57'
RW	14	Will Jordan
OC	13	Rieko Ioane
IC	12	Jordie Barrett	(substituted off) 62'
LW	11	Mark Tele'a
FH	10	Richie Mo'unga
SH	9	Aaron Smith	(substituted off) 60'
N8	8	Ardie Savea (c)
OF	7	Dalton Papalii
BF	6	Shannon Frizell	(substituted off) 65'
RL	5	Scott Barrett
LL	4	Brodie Retallick	(substituted off) 50'
TP	3	Tyrel Lomax	(substituted off) 53'
HK	2	Codie Taylor	(substituted off) 50'
LP	1	Ethan de Groot	(substituted off) 50'
Replacements:
HK	16	Samisoni Taukei'aho	(substituted on) 50'
PR	17	Ofa Tu'ungafasi	(substituted on) 50'
PR	18	Nepo Laulala	(substituted on) 53'
LK	19	Sam Whitelock	(substituted on) 50'
FL	20	Luke Jacobson	(substituted on) 65'
SH	21	Cam Roigard	(substituted on) 60'
CE	22	Anton Lienert-Brown	(substituted on) 62'
WG	23	Caleb Clarke	(substituted on) 57'
Coach:
(New Zealand) Ian Foster

Player of the Match:
Will Jordan (New Zealand)

Assistant referees:
Karl Dickson (England)
Christophe Ridley (England)
Television match official:
Tom Foley (England)
Foul play review officer:
Marius Jonker (South Africa)

Notes:

- Cam Roigard (New Zealand) made his international debut.
- With this loss, Australia finish bottom for the first time since 2020.
- Australia finish winless for the first time in the Rugby Championship and the first time since 2005 before the competition expanded in 2012.
- New Zealand retained the Bledisloe Cup.
- The 83,944 crowd was an attendance high for Australia for 20 years.

29 July 2023
17:05 SAST (UTC+2)

South Africa	22–21	Argentina (1 BP)
Try: Etzebeth 18' m de Allende 25' c Libbok 68' c Con: Libbok (2/3) 27', 69'; Pen: Libbok (1/1) 11'	Report	Try: M. Carreras 74' m Bertranou 80+2' c Con: S. Carreras (1/2) 80+3'; Pen: S. Carreras (3/5) 2', 9', 37'

Ellis Park Stadium, Johannesburg
Attendance: 45,000
Referee: Andrew Brace (Ireland)

FB	15	Willie le Roux		(substituted off) 78'
RW	14	Cheslin Kolbe
OC	13	Jesse Kriel
IC	12	Damian de Allende	(yellow card) 72'
LW	11	Kurt-Lee Arendse		(substituted off) 52'
FH	10	Manie Libbok
SH	9	Grant Williams		(substituted off) 1'
N8	8	Duane Vermeulen (c)
BF	7	Pieter-Steph du Toit
OF	6	Marco van Staden		(substituted off) 55'
RL	5	Marvin Orie		(substituted off) 45'
LL	4	Eben Etzebeth
TP	3	Frans Malherbe		(substituted off) 58'
HK	2	Malcolm Marx		(substituted off) 58'
LP	1	Steven Kitshoff		(substituted off) 58'
Replacements:
HK	16	Bongi Mbonambi		(substituted on) 58'
PR	17	Trevor Nyakane		(substituted on) 58'
PR	18	Vincent Koch		(substituted on) 58'
FL	19	Kwagga Smith		(substituted on) 55'
LK	20	RG Snyman		(substituted on) 45'
SH	21	Faf de Klerk		(substituted on) 1'
CE	22	Lukhanyo Am		(substituted on) 52'
FH	23	Damian Willemse		(substituted on) 78'
Coach:
(South Africa) Jacques Nienaber

FB	15	Juan Cruz Mallia
RW	14	Mateo Carreras
OC	13	Lucio Cinti
IC	12	Santiago Chocobares
LW	11	Juan Imhoff	(substituted off) 66'
FH	10	Santiago Carreras	(substituted off) 20'	(substituted on) 31'
SH	9	Lautaro Bazán	(substituted off) 48'
N8	8	Juan Martín González
OF	7	Santiago Grondona	(substituted off) 55'
BF	6	Pablo Matera
RL	5	Tomás Lavanini
LL	4	Lucas Paulos	(substituted off) 40'
TP	3	Francisco Gómez Kodela	(substituted off) 58'
HK	2	Julián Montoya (c)	34' to 37'		(substituted off) 58'
LP	1	Thomas Gallo	(substituted off) 48'
Replacements:
HK	16	Ignacio Ruiz	(substituted on) 34'	(substituted off) 37'	(substituted on) 58'
PR	17	Nahuel Tetaz Chaparro	(substituted on) 48'
PR	18	Joel Sclavi	(substituted on) 58'
FL	19	Pedro Rubiolo	(substituted on) 40'
N8	20	Facundo Isa	(substituted on) 55'
SH	21	Gonzalo Bertranou	(substituted on) 48'
FH	22	Tomás Albornoz	(substituted on) 20'	(substituted off) 31'
CE	23	Matías Moroni	(substituted on) 66'
Coach:
(Australia) Michael Cheika

Player of the Match:
Eben Etzebeth (South Africa)

Assistant referees:
Nika Amashukeli (Georgia)
Chris Busby (Ireland)
Television match official:
Brett Cronan (Australia)
Foul play review officer:
Brian MacNeice (Ireland)

== Statistics ==
=== Points scorers ===
Pos.	Name	Team	Pts.
1	Richie Mo'unga	New Zealand	28
2	Manie Libbok	South Africa	21
3	Emiliano Boffelli	Argentina	16
4	Kurt-Lee Arendse	South Africa	15
5	Santiago Carreras	Argentina	11
5	Quade Cooper	Australia	11
7	Mateo Carreras	Argentina	10
7	Shannon Frizell	New Zealand	10
7	Rieko Ioane	New Zealand	10
7	Will Jordan	New Zealand	10
7	Aaron Smith	New Zealand	10
12	Carter Gordon	Australia	9

=== Try scorers ===
Pos.	Name	Team	Tries
1	Kurt-Lee Arendse	South Africa	3
2	Mateo Carreras	Argentina	2
2	Shannon Frizell	New Zealand	2
2	Rieko Ioane	New Zealand	2
2	Will Jordan	New Zealand	2
2	Aaron Smith	New Zealand	2
7	28 players		1

== Squads ==
Nation	Match venues			Head coach	Captain
Nation	Name	City	Capacity	Head coach	Captain
Argentina	Estadio Malvinas Argentinas	Mendoza	42,000	Michael Cheika	Julián Montoya
Australia	Melbourne Cricket Ground	Melbourne	100,024	Eddie Jones	Michael Hooper; James Slipper
Australia	Western Sydney Stadium	Sydney	30,000	Eddie Jones	Michael Hooper; James Slipper
New Zealand	Mount Smart Stadium	Auckland	30,000	Ian Foster	Sam Cane
South Africa	Ellis Park Stadium	Johannesburg	60,000	Jacques Nienaber	Siya Kolisi
South Africa	Loftus Versfeld Stadium	Pretoria	51,762	Jacques Nienaber	Siya Kolisi

=== Argentina ===
On 23 June, Michael Cheika named a 48-man squad ahead of the 2023 Rugby Championship and in preparation for the 2023 Rugby World Cup.

Note: Flags indicate national union for the club/province as defined by World Rugby.

Player	Position	Date of birth (age)	Caps	Club/province
Facundo Bosch	Hooker	8 August 1991 (aged 31)	13	(France) Bayonne
Agustin Creevy	Hooker	15 March 1985 (aged 38)	97	(England) London Irish
Julián Montoya (c)	Hooker	29 October 1993 (aged 29)	85	(England) Leicester Tigers
Santiago Socino	Hooker	7 May 1992 (aged 31)	8	(England) Gloucester
Ignacio Ruiz	Hooker	3 January 2001 (aged 22)	4	(England) London Irish
Eduardo Bello	Prop	27 November 1995 (aged 27)	10	(England) Saracens
Ignacio Calles	Prop	24 October 1995 (aged 27)	2	(France) Pau
Thomas Gallo	Prop	30 April 1999 (aged 24)	13	(Italy) Benetton
Francisco Gómez Kodela	Prop	7 July 1985 (aged 38)	28	(France) Lyon
Santiago Medrano	Prop	6 May 1996 (aged 27)	32	(Australia) Western Force
Joel Sclavi	Prop	25 June 1994 (aged 29)	9	(France) La Rochelle
Lucio Sordoni	Prop	23 July 1998 (aged 24)	3	(Scotland) Glasgow Warriors
Nahuel Tetaz Chaparro	Prop	11 March 1989 (aged 34)	76	(Italy) Benetton
Mayco Vivas	Prop	2 June 1998 (aged 25)	17	(England) Gloucester
Matías Alemanno	Lock	5 December 1991 (aged 31)	84	(England) Gloucester
Marcos Kremer	Lock	30 July 1997 (aged 25)	56	(France) Stade Français
Tomás Lavanini	Lock	22 January 1993 (aged 30)	78	(France) Clermont
Lucas Paulos	Lock	9 January 1998 (aged 25)	10	(France) Brive
Guido Petti	Lock	17 September 1994 (aged 28)	73	(France) Bordeaux Bègles
Rodrigo Bruni	Back row	3 September 1993 (aged 29)	18	(France) Brive
Facundo Isa	Back row	21 September 1993 (aged 29)	44	(France) Toulon
Juan Martín González	Back row	14 November 2000 (aged 22)	20	(England) London Irish
Santiago Grondona	Back row	25 July 1998 (aged 24)	10	(England) Exeter Chiefs
Pablo Matera	Back row	18 July 1993 (aged 29)	91	(Japan) Mie Honda Heat
Joaquín Oviedo	Back row	17 January 2001 (aged 22)	1	(France) Perpignan
Pedro Rubiolo	Back row	12 December 2002 (aged 20)	1	(England) Newcastle Falcons
Lautaro Bazán	Scrum-half	24 February 1996 (aged 27)	3	(Italy) Rugby Rovigo Delta
Gonzalo Bertranou	Scrum-half	31 December 1993 (aged 29)	49	(Wales) Dragons
Tomás Cubelli	Scrum-half	12 June 1989 (aged 34)	88	(France) Biarritz
Gonzalo García	Scrum-half	5 March 1999 (aged 24)	3	(Italy) Zebre Parma
Tomás Albornoz	Fly-half	17 September 1997 (aged 25)	3	(Italy) Benetton
Santiago Carreras	Fly-half	30 March 1998 (aged 25)	31	(England) Gloucester
Nicolás Sánchez	Fly-half	26 August 1988 (aged 34)	95	(France) Stade Français
Santiago Chocobares	Centre	31 March 1999 (aged 24)	11	(France) Toulouse
Lucio Cinti	Centre	23 February 2000 (aged 23)	12	(England) London Irish
Jeronimo de la Fuente	Centre	24 February 1991 (aged 32)	74	(France) Perpignan
Luciano González	Centre	10 April 1997 (aged 26)	0	Argentina Sevens
Matías Moroni	Centre	29 March 1991 (aged 32)	69	(England) Newcastle Falcons
Matías Orlando	Centre	14 November 1991 (aged 31)	57	(England) Newcastle Falcons
Emiliano Boffelli	Wing	16 January 1995 (aged 28)	50	(Scotland) Edinburgh
Sebastián Cancelliere	Wing	17 September 1993 (aged 29)	13	(Scotland) Glasgow Warriors
Mateo Carreras	Wing	17 December 1999 (aged 23)	7	(England) Newcastle Falcons
Santiago Cordero	Wing	6 December 1993 (aged 29)	49	(France) Bordeaux
Bautista Delguy	Wing	22 April 1997 (aged 26)	25	(France) Clermont
Juan Imhoff	Wing	11 May 1988 (aged 35)	41	(France) Racing 92
Rodrigo Isgro	Wing	24 March 1999 (aged 24)	0	Argentina Sevens
Martín Bogado	Fullback	29 April 1998 (aged 25)	0	(France) Bayonne
Juan Cruz Mallia	Fullback	11 September 1996 (aged 26)	24	(France) Toulouse

=== Australia ===
On 25 June, Eddie Jones named a 34-man squad for the opening two matches of the 2023 Rugby Championship.

Angus Bell, Langi Gleeson, Andrew Kellaway, Samu Kerevi, Jordan Petaia and Matt Philip were also included as an rehab group that will train with the squad.

On 10 July, Pone Fa'amausili and Blake Schoupp joined up with the squad ahead of the Argentina test whilst Taniela Tupou was temporarily released to Australia A.

On 20 July, Eddie Jones named an up-dated 34-player squad for the Bledisloe Cup series which saw Matt Gibbon, Reece Hodge, Josh Kemeny, Zane Nonggorr, Pete Samu and Tom Wright dropped from the squad. Len Ikitau was also not included following injury sustained against Argentina.

Player	Position	Date of birth (age)	Caps	Club/province
Matt Faessler	Hooker	21 December 1998 (aged 24)	0	(Australia) Reds
Dave Porecki	Hooker	23 October 1992 (aged 30)	10	(Australia) Waratahs
Jordan Uelese	Hooker	24 January 1997 (aged 26)	15	(Australia) Rebels
Allan Alaalatoa	Prop	28 January 1994 (aged 29)	64	(Australia) Brumbies
Angus Bell	Prop	4 October 2000 (aged 22)	20	(Australia) Waratahs
Pone Fa'amausili	Prop	26 February 1997 (aged 26)	3	(Australia) Rebels
Matt Gibbon	Prop	3 June 1995 (aged 28)	5	(Australia) Rebels
Zane Nonggorr	Prop	1 January 2000 (aged 23)	0	(Australia) Reds
Blake Schoupp	Prop	28 March 1998 (aged 25)	0	(Australia) Brumbies
James Slipper	Prop	6 June 1989 (aged 34)	127	(Australia) Brumbies
Taniela Tupou	Prop	10 May 1996 (aged 27)	47	(Australia) Reds
Richie Arnold	Lock	1 July 1990 (aged 33)	0	(France) Stade Toulousain
Nick Frost	Lock	10 October 1999 (aged 23)	9	(Australia) Brumbies
Jed Holloway	Lock	2 November 1992 (aged 30)	10	(Australia) Waratahs
Tom Hooper	Lock	1 January 2002 (aged 21)	0	(Australia) Brumbies
Matt Philip	Lock	7 March 1994 (aged 29)	27	(Australia) Rebels
Will Skelton	Lock	3 May 1992 (aged 31)	24	(France) Stade Rochelais
Langi Gleeson	Back row	21 July 2001 (aged 21)	3	(Australia) Waratahs
Michael Hooper	Back row	29 October 1991 (aged 31)	124	(Australia) Waratahs
Josh Kemeny	Back row	29 November 1998 (aged 24)	0	(Australia) Rebels
Rob Leota	Back row	3 March 1997 (aged 26)	13	(Australia) Rebels
Fraser McReight	Back row	19 February 1999 (aged 24)	10	(Australia) Reds
Pete Samu	Back row	17 December 1991 (aged 31)	32	(Australia) Brumbies
Rob Valetini	Back row	3 September 1998 (aged 24)	30	(Australia) Brumbies
Ryan Lonergan	Scrum-half	6 April 1998 (aged 25)	0	(Australia) Brumbies
Tate McDermott	Scrum-half	18 September 1998 (aged 24)	21	(Australia) Reds
Nic White	Scrum-half	13 June 1990 (aged 33)	59	(Australia) Brumbies
Quade Cooper	Fly-half	5 April 1988 (aged 35)	76	(Japan) Hanazono Kintetsu Liners
Ben Donaldson	Fly-half	5 April 1999 (aged 24)	2	(Australia) Waratahs
Carter Gordon	Fly-half	29 January 2001 (aged 22)	0	(Australia) Rebels
Lalakai Foketi	Centre	22 December 1994 (aged 28)	5	(Australia) Waratahs
Len Ikitau	Centre	1 October 1998 (aged 24)	26	(Australia) Brumbies
Samu Kerevi	Centre	27 September 1993 (aged 29)	41	(Japan) Urayasu D-Rocks
Izaia Perese	Centre	17 May 1997 (aged 26)	3	(Australia) Waratahs
Jordan Petaia	Centre	14 March 2000 (aged 23)	25	(Australia) Reds
Marika Koroibete	Wing	26 July 1992 (aged 30)	51	(Japan) Saitama Wild Knights
Mark Nawaqanitawase	Wing	11 September 2000 (aged 22)	3	(Australia) Waratahs
Dylan Pietsch	Wing	23 April 1998 (aged 25)	0	(Australia) Waratahs
Suliasi Vunivalu	Wing	27 November 1995 (aged 27)	1	(Australia) Reds
Tom Wright	Wing	21 July 1997 (aged 25)	23	(Australia) Brumbies
Reece Hodge	Fullback	26 August 1994 (aged 28)	54	(Australia) Rebels
Andrew Kellaway	Fullback	12 October 1995 (aged 27)	21	(Australia) Rebels

=== New Zealand ===
On 18 June, head coach Ian Foster confirmed a 36-player squad for the 2023 Rugby Championship.

Player	Position	Date of birth (age)	Caps	Franchise/province
Dane Coles	Hooker	10 December 1986 (aged 36)	84	Hurricanes / Wellington
Samisoni Taukei'aho	Hooker	8 August 1997 (aged 25)	24	Chiefs / Waikato
Codie Taylor	Hooker	31 March 1991 (aged 32)	76	Crusaders / Canterbury
Ethan de Groot	Prop	22 July 1998 (aged 24)	13	Highlanders / Southland
Nepo Laulala	Prop	6 November 1991 (aged 31)	45	Blues / Counties Manukau
Tyrel Lomax	Prop	16 March 1996 (aged 27)	23	Hurricanes / Tasman
Fletcher Newell	Prop	1 March 2000 (aged 23)	6	Crusaders / Canterbury
Ofa Tu'ungafasi	Prop	19 April 1992 (aged 31)	50	Blues / Northland
Tamaiti Williams	Prop	10 August 2000 (aged 22)	0	Crusaders / Canterbury
Scott Barrett	Lock	20 November 1993 (aged 29)	58	Crusaders / Taranaki
Josh Lord	Lock	17 January 2001 (aged 22)	2	Chiefs / Taranaki
Brodie Retallick	Lock	31 May 1991 (aged 32)	100	Chiefs / Hawke's Bay
Tupou Vaa'i	Lock	27 January 2000 (aged 23)	18	Chiefs / Taranaki
Sam Whitelock	Lock	12 October 1988 (aged 34)	143	Crusaders / Canterbury
Sam Cane (C)	Loose forward	13 January 1992 (aged 31)	86	Chiefs / Bay of Plenty
Samipeni Finau	Loose forward	10 May 1999 (aged 24)	0	Chiefs / Waikato
Shannon Frizell	Loose forward	11 February 1994 (aged 29)	25	Highlanders / Tasman
Luke Jacobson	Loose forward	20 April 1997 (aged 26)	12	Chiefs / Waikato
Dalton Papalii	Loose forward	11 October 1997 (aged 25)	22	Blues / Counties Manukau
Ardie Savea	Loose forward	14 October 1993 (aged 29)	70	Hurricanes / Wellington
Finlay Christie	Half-back	19 September 1995 (aged 27)	14	Blues / Tasman
Cam Roigard	Half-back	16 November 2000 (aged 22)	0	Hurricanes / Counties Manukau
Aaron Smith	Half-back	21 November 1988 (aged 34)	114	Highlanders / Manawatu
Beauden Barrett	First five-eighth	27 May 1991 (aged 32)	112	Blues / Taranaki
Damian McKenzie	First five-eighth	20 April 1995 (aged 28)	40	Chiefs / Waikato
Richie Mo'unga	First five-eighth	25 May 1994 (aged 29)	44	Crusaders / Canterbury
Jordie Barrett	Centre	17 February 1997 (aged 26)	48	Hurricanes / Taranaki
Braydon Ennor	Centre	16 July 1997 (aged 25)	6	Crusaders / Canterbury
Rieko Ioane	Centre	18 March 1997 (aged 26)	59	Blues / Auckland
Anton Lienert-Brown	Centre	15 April 1995 (aged 28)	60	Chiefs / Waikato
Dallas McLeod	Centre	30 April 1999 (aged 24)	0	Crusaders / Canterbury
Caleb Clarke	Wing	29 March 1999 (aged 24)	15	Blues / Auckland
Leicester Fainga'anuku	Wing	11 October 1999 (aged 23)	2	Crusaders / Tasman
Emoni Narawa	Wing	13 July 1999 (aged 23)	0	Chiefs / Bay of Plenty
Mark Tele'a	Wing	6 December 1996 (aged 26)	2	Blues / North Harbour
Will Jordan	Fullback	24 February 1998 (aged 25)	21	Crusaders / Tasman

=== South Africa ===
On 10 June, head coach Jacques Nienaber named a 41-man squad ahead of the 2023 Rugby Championship.

Player	Position	Date of birth (age)	Caps	Club/province
Joseph Dweba	Hooker	25 October 1995 (aged 27)	2	(South Africa) Stormers
Deon Fourie	Hooker	25 September 1986 (aged 36)	4	(South Africa) Stormers
Malcolm Marx	Hooker	13 July 1994 (aged 28)	59	(Japan) Kubota Spears
Bongi Mbonambi	Hooker	7 January 1991 (aged 32)	55	(South Africa) Sharks
Thomas du Toit	Prop	5 May 1995 (aged 28)	15	(South Africa) Sharks
Steven Kitshoff	Prop	10 February 1992 (aged 31)	71	(South Africa) Stormers
Vincent Koch	Prop	13 March 1990 (aged 33)	41	(France) Stade Français
Frans Malherbe	Prop	14 March 1991 (aged 32)	58	(South Africa) Stormers
Ox Nché	Prop	23 July 1995 (aged 27)	19	(South Africa) Sharks
Trevor Nyakane	Prop	4 May 1989 (aged 34)	59	(France) Racing 92
Lood de Jager	Lock	17 December 1992 (aged 30)	65	(Japan) Saitama Wild Knights
Eben Etzebeth	Lock	29 October 1991 (aged 31)	110	(South Africa) Sharks
Jean Kleyn	Lock	26 August 1993 (aged 29)	0	(Ireland) Munster
Franco Mostert	Lock	27 November 1990 (aged 32)	63	(Japan) Mie Honda Heat
Marvin Orie	Lock	15 February 1993 (aged 30)	11	(South Africa) Stormers
RG Snyman	Lock	29 January 1995 (aged 28)	23	(Ireland) Munster
Jean-Luc du Preez	Loose forward	5 August 1995 (aged 27)	13	(England) Sale Sharks
Pieter-Steph du Toit	Loose forward	20 August 1992 (aged 30)	66	(Japan) Toyota Verblitz
Siya Kolisi (c)	Loose forward	16 June 1991 (aged 32)	75	(South Africa) Sharks
Evan Roos	Loose forward	21 January 2000 (aged 23)	3	(South Africa) Stormers
Kwagga Smith	Loose forward	11 June 1993 (aged 30)	31	(Japan) Shizuoka Blue Revs
Marco van Staden	Loose forward	25 August 1995 (aged 27)	10	(South Africa) Bulls
Duane Vermeulen	Loose forward	3 July 1986 (aged 37)	65	(Ireland) Ulster
Jasper Wiese	Loose forward	21 October 1995 (aged 27)	20	(England) Leicester Tigers
Faf de Klerk	Scrum-half	19 October 1991 (aged 31)	46	(Japan) Yokohama Canon Eagles
Jaden Hendrikse	Scrum-half	23 March 2000 (aged 23)	12	(South Africa) Sharks
Herschel Jantjies	Scrum-half	22 April 1996 (aged 27)	22	(South Africa) Stormers
Cobus Reinach	Scrum-half	7 February 1990 (aged 33)	24	(France) Montpellier
Grant Williams	Scrum-half	2 July 1996 (aged 27)	1	(South Africa) Sharks
Manie Libbok	Fly-half	15 July 1997 (aged 25)	3	(South Africa) Stormers
Handre Pollard	Fly-half	11 March 1994 (aged 29)	63	(England) Leicester Tigers
Damian Willemse	Fly-half	7 May 1998 (aged 25)	27	(South Africa) Stormers
Lukhanyo Am	Centre	28 November 1993 (aged 29)	31	(South Africa) Sharks
Damian de Allende	Centre	25 November 1991 (aged 31)	70	(Japan) Saitama Wild Knights
André Esterhuizen	Centre	30 March 1994 (aged 29)	11	(England) Harlequins
Jesse Kriel	Centre	15 February 1994 (aged 29)	59	(Japan) Yokohama Canon Eagles
Kurt-Lee Arendse	Wing	17 June 1996 (aged 27)	7	(South Africa) Bulls
Cheslin Kolbe	Wing	28 October 1993 (aged 29)	23	(France) Toulon
Makazole Mapimpi	Wing	26 July 1990 (aged 32)	36	(South Africa) Sharks
Canan Moodie	Wing	5 November 2002 (aged 20)	4	(South Africa) Bulls
Willie le Roux	Fullback	18 August 1989 (aged 33)	83	(Japan) Toyota Verblitz

== See also ==
- 2023 Rugby World Cup warm-up matches
- 2023 Rugby World Cup
