= List of New Zealand national rugby union team player records =

The New Zealand national rugby union team have competed since 1884, and there are a number of individual records achieved since that time. The team is also known as the All Blacks, and have competed in Test rugby since their match against Australia in 1903. The record for the most Test appearances for the All Blacks is held by Sam Whitelock — who played 153 Test matches for the team. Richie McCaw was the first All Black to play over 100 Test matches; a record he achieved during the 2011 Rugby World Cup. The record for most Test points by an All Black is held by Dan Carter, who scored 1598 points between 2003 and 2015. The record for the number of Test tries in All Blacks history is held by Will Jordan, who has scored 56 tries since his debut in 2020.

== Most caps ==
#	Player	Pos	Span	Mat	Start	Sub	Won	Lost	Draw	Win %
1	Sam Whitelock	Lock	2010–2023	153	127	26	125	22	6	81.7%
2	**Beauden Barrett**	Fly-half/Fullback	2012–	150	106	44	118	28	4	78.7%
3	Richie McCaw	Flanker	2001–2015	148	141	7	131	15	2	88.5%
4	Keven Mealamu	Hooker	2002–2015	132	77	55	114	16	2	86.4%
5	Kieran Read	Number 8	2008–2019	127	120	7	107	16	4	84.3%
6	Aaron Smith	Scrum-half	2012–2023	125	114	11	100	19	6	80%
7	Tony Woodcock	Prop	2002–2015	118	105	13	102	15	1	86.4%
8	**Codie Taylor**	Hooker	2015–	116	84	32	88	24	4	75.9%
9	Dan Carter	Fly-half	2003–2015	112	106	6	99	12	1	88.4%
9	**Ardie Savea**	Flanker/Number 8	2016–	112	85	27	84	22	3	75%

Current as England vs New Zealand, 21 November 2026. Statistics include officially capped matches only. Current All Blacks are indicated in bold type.

== Most tries ==
#	Player	Position	Career span	Mat	Start	Sub	Pts	Tries	Tries/ match
1	**Will Jordan**	Fullback/Wing	2020–	65	60	5	280	56	0.86
2	**Beauden Barrett**	Fly-half/Fullback	2012–	150	106	44	860	51	0.34
3	Doug Howlett	Wing	2000–2007	62	55	7	245	49	0.79
4	Christian Cullen	Fullback	1996–2002	58	56	2	236	46	0.79
4	Joe Rokocoko	Wing	2003–2010	68	66	2	230	46	0.68
4	Julian Savea	Wing	2012–2017	54	51	3	230	46	0.85
7	Jeff Wilson	Wing	1993–2001	60	60	0	234	44	0.73
8	**Rieko Ioane**	Centre/Wing	2016–	94	76	18	200	40	0.43
9	Ben Smith	Fullback/Wing	2009–2019	84	72	12	195	39	0.46
10	Jonah Lomu	Wing	1994–2002	63	54	9	185	37	0.59

Current as England vs New Zealand, 21 November 2026. Statistics include officially capped test matches only. Current All Blacks are indicated in bold type.

== Most points ==
#	Player	Career span	Pts	Caps	Tries	Conv	Pens	Drop	Avg
1	Dan Carter	2003–2015	1,598	112	29	293	281	8	14.27
2	Andrew Mehrtens	1995–2004	967	70	7	169	188	10	13.81
3	**Beauden Barrett**	2012–	860	150	51	199	66	3	5.73
4	Grant Fox	1985–1993	645	46	1	118	128	7	14.02
5	**Richie Mo'unga**	2017–	474	57	11	148	41	0	8.32
6	**Damian McKenzie**	2016–	435	85	24	99	39	0	5.12
7	Aaron Cruden	2010–2017	322	50	5	63	56	1	6.44
8	**Jordie Barrett**	2017–	306	88	26	50	26	0	3.48
9	Carlos Spencer	1997–2004	291	35	14	49	41	0	8.31
10	**Will Jordan**	2020–	280	65	56	0	0	0	4.31

Current as England vs New Zealand, 21 November 2026. Statistics include officially capped matches only. Current All Blacks are indicated in bold type.

== Most points in a match ==
#	Player	Position	Pts	Tries	Conv	Pens	Drop	Result	Opposition	Date
1.	Simon Culhane	Fly-half	45	1	20	0	0	**145**–17	Japan	4 June 1995
2.	Tony Brown	Fly-half	36	1	11	3	0	**101**–3	Italy	14 October 1999
3.	Carlos Spencer	Fly-half	33	2	10	1	0	**93**–8	Argentina	21 June 1997
3.	Andrew Mehrtens	Fly-half	33	1	5	6	0	**63**–15	Ireland	15 November 1997
3.	Dan Carter	Fly-half	33	2	4	5	0	**48**–18	British and Irish Lions	2 July 2005
3.	Nick Evans	Fly-half	33	1	14	0	0	**108**–13	Portugal	15 September 2007
7.	Tony Brown	Fly-half	32	1	12	1	0	**102**–0	Tonga	16 June 2000
8.	Marc Ellis	Centre	30	6	0	0	0	**145**–17	Japan	4 June 1995
8.	Tony Brown	Fly-half	30	3	3	3	0	**50**–6	Samoa	16 June 2001
8.	**Beauden Barrett**	Fly-half	30	4	5	0	0	**40**–12	Australia	25 August 2018

Current as England vs New Zealand, 21 November 2026. Statistics include officially capped matches only. Current All Blacks are indicated in bold type.

== Most tries in a match ==
#	Player	Position	Tries	Result	Opposition	Date
1.	Marc Ellis	Centre	6	**145**–17	Japan	4 June 1995
2.	Jeff Wilson	Wing	5	**71**–5	Fiji	14 June 1997
2.	**Will Jordan**	Wing	5	**102**–0	Tonga	3 July 2021
4.	Duncan McGregor	Wing	4	**15**–0	England	2 December 1905
4.	John Gallagher	Fullback	4	**74**–13	Fiji	27 May 1987
4.	Craig Green	Wing	4	**74**–13	Fiji	27 May 1987
4.	John Kirwan	Wing	4	**52**–3	Wales	28 May 1988
4.	Jonah Lomu	Wing	4	**45**–29	England	18 June 1995
4.	Christian Cullen	Fullback	4	**62**–31	Scotland	15 June 1996
4.	Jeff Wilson	Fullback	4	**71**–13	Samoa	18 June 1999
4.	Mils Muliaina	Wing	4	**68**–6	Canada	17 October 2003
4.	Sitiveni Sivivatu	Wing	4	**91**–0	Fiji	10 June 2005
4.	Zac Guildford	Wing	4	**79**–15	Canada	2 October 2011
4.	**Beauden Barrett**	Fly-half	4	**40**–12	Australia	25 August 2018
4.	**Jordie Barrett**	Wing	4	**66**–3	Italy	24 November 2018
4.	George Bridge	Wing	4	**92**–7	Tonga	7 September 2019
4.	Dane Coles	Hooker	4	**57**–23	Fiji	10 July 2021

Current as England vs New Zealand, 21 November 2026. Statistics include officially capped matches only. Current All Blacks are indicated in bold type.

== Most matches as captain ==
#	Player	Span	Caps	Total caps	Win %
1.	Richie McCaw	2004–2015	110	148	89.09%
2.	Kieran Read	2012–2019	52	127	84.31%
3.	Sean Fitzpatrick	1992–1997	51	92	77.45%
4.	Wilson Whineray	1958–1965	30	32	78.33%
5.	Sam Cane	2015–2023	27	104	75%
6.	Reuben Thorne	2002–2007	23	50	86.95%
7.	Taine Randell	1998–2002	22	51	56.81%
8.	Tana Umaga	2004–2005	21	74	85.71%
9.	Scott Barrett	2024–2025	20	92	70.00%
9.	**Ardie Savea**	2021-	20	112	75.00%

Current as England vs New Zealand, 21 November 2026. Statistics include officially capped matches only. Current All Blacks are indicated in bold type.

== Youngest players ==
#	Player	Age	DOB	Debut	Opposition
1.	Jonah Lomu	19 years 45 days	12 May 1975	26 June 1994	France
2.	Edgar Wrigley	19 years 79 days	15 June 1886	2 September 1905	Australia
3.	Pat Walsh	19 years 106 days	6 May 1936	20 August 1955	Australia
4.	John Kirwan	19 years 183 days	16 December 1964	16 June 1984	France
5.	George Nēpia	19 years 190 days	25 April 1905	1 November 1924	Ireland
6.	Billy Mitchell	19 years 211 days	28 November 1890	27 June 1910	Australia
7.	Bill Francis	19 years 221 days	4 February 1894	13 September 1913	Australia
8.	**Rieko Ioane**	19 years 239 days	18 March 1997	12 November 2016	Italy
9.	James Baird	19 years 270 days	17 December 1893	13 September 1913	Australia

Current as England vs New Zealand, 21 November 2026. Statistics include officially capped matches only. Current All Blacks are indicated in bold type.

== Oldest players ==
#	Player	Age	DOB	Last match	Opposition
1.	Ned Hughes	40 years 123 days	26 April 1881	27 August 1921	South Africa
2.	Dane Coles	36 years 308 days	10 December 1986	14 October 2023	Ireland
3.	Brad Thorn	36 years 262 days	3 February 1975	23 October 2011	France
4.	Keven Mealamu	36 years 225 days	20 March 1979	31 October 2015	Australia
5.	Frank Bunce	35 years 305 days	4 February 1962	6 December 1997	England
6.	John Ashworth	35 years 283 days	15 September 1949	29 June 1985	Australia
7.	**Codie Taylor**	35 years 236 days	31 March 1991	21 November 2026	England
8.	Richard Loe	35 years 226 days	6 April 1960	18 November 1995	France
9.	**Beauden Barrett**	35 years 178 days	27 May 1991	21 November 2026	England
10.	Tane Norton	35 years 136 days	30 March 1942	13 August 1977	British and Irish Lions

Current as England vs New Zealand, 21 November 2026. Statistics include officially capped matches only. Current All Blacks are indicated in bold type.
