= Saint Kentigern College =

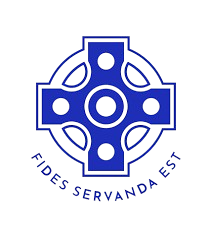

Location
- 130 Pakuranga Road, Pakuranga, Auckland, New Zealand; 36°54′33.06″S 174°52′27.25″E

Information
- Type: Private, day & boarding
- Motto: Latin: Fides Servanda Est (The faith must be kept)
- Denomination: Presbyterian
- Patron saint: Saint Kentigern
- Established: 1953; 73 years ago
- Ministry of Education Institution no.: 81
- Head of Saint Kentigern: Damon Emtage
- Gender: Coeducational
- Enrolment: 2,343 (July 2026)
- Accreditation: IBO
- Socio-economic decile: 10
- Website: saintkentigern.com

Saint Kentigern College is a private co-educational Presbyterian secondary school in Auckland, New Zealand. The school is operated by the Saint Kentigern Trust Board.

Established in 1953, the college is semi-co-educational, with a single-gender Middle College for Years 7 and 8, single-gender core subjects for Years 9 and 10, and a co-educational Senior College for Years 11 to 13.

In 2003, the college introduced girls into the school for the first time with 140 female students known as the 'Foundation Girls'. As of 15 May 2025, 1,113 girls and 1,678 boys are enrolled, with the numbers of both increasing slightly each year since 2020.

Saint Kentigern College is an IB World School, offering the International Baccalaureate (IB) Diploma Programme for Year 12 and 13 students. The Saint Kentigern Trust Board approved the IB programme in late 2006, and it was first offered in 2009.

== History ==
A group of Presbyterian ministers and laymen founded Saint Kentigern College in 1953, naming it after Saint Kentigern of Glasgow. Its first headmaster was a minister from the University of Glasgow, Reverend Adam MacFarlan. When MacFarlan retired, he was appointed an Officer of the Order of the British Empire, for services to education and the community, in the 1983 Queen's Birthday Honours.

Saint Kentigern College Executive Head Warren Peat left at the end of 2008 to become headmaster of John Paul College, near Brisbane, Australia. Stephen Cole then took up the role of headmaster. Cole left Saint Kentigern at the end of Term 1, 2017, and the position of Head of College was then disestablished and replaced with separate positions for Principal of Middle College (Years 7–10) and Principal of Senior College (Years 11–13). At the same time, a new role as Head of Saint Kentigern was created, with the former headmaster of Rangitoto College David Hodge taking up the position.

In 2019, the Saint Kentigern Trust Board decided to amend the separate middle college and senior college model, returning to a single college structure. Russell Brooke, formerly the principal of ACG Parnell College, was appointed as the new principal of Saint Kentigern College. Brooke resigned in October 2021, following a period of unexplained leave which had been in effect from August 2021. Subsequently, Duncan McQueen assumed the role of acting principal until Damon Emtage joined Saint Kentigern College as principal in January 2023. Emtage had previously worked in several independent schools in Australia, including Brisbane Grammar School and Wesley College, Melbourne.

In 2019, the college sold its girls' school and preschool campus to Auckland Hebrew Congregation. The congregation and Kadimah School, a Jewish day school, now occupy the campus. Saint Kentigern Girls' School resumed operations at a newly constructed facility on Shore Road in Remuera in 2022.

On 23 November 2023, the college received a bomb threat that resulted in the school's early closure at 11:30 am. Bomb threats were made to 15 other organisations.

== Enrolment ==
As a private school, Saint Kentigern College charges tuition fees to cover costs. For the 2025 school year, tuition fees for New Zealand residents are $27,329 per year. Boarding fees are an additional $20,971 per year.

As of July 2026, the school has a roll of 2,343 students, of which 126 (5.4%) identify as Māori. As a private school, the school is not assigned an Equity Index.

== School structure ==
Students are allocated into one of six houses and compete throughout the year in house competitions. Each house is named after a Scottish Presbyterian church martyr, as follows:

- Wishart for George Wishart (yellow)
- Hamilton for Patrick Hamilton (red)
- Chalmers for James Chalmers (blue)
- Cargill for Donald Cargill (green)
- Wilson for Margaret Wilson (purple)
- Stark for Helen Stark (teal)

=== Rugby ===
Alumni of the Rugby Program who have represented New Zealand (for the All Blacks) include Steve Surridge, John Afoa, Joe Rokocoko, Jerome Kaino, Kieran Read, Matt Duffie, Seta Tamanivalu, Dalton Papali'i, Braydon Ennor, Finlay Christie and Tamaiti Williams.

The 1st XV were the previous holders of the Moascar Cup. First in 1981 from defeating Wesley, and again in 1999 when they defeated the then World champion, Kelston Boys, by 18–14. Other notable years include 1996, 1998 and 2000, where they were Runners-up in the 1A competition.

In 2001, the 1st XV surpassed their performance in the previous year's 1A competition and claimed the championship by defeating King's College in the final. The team was relegated from 1A in 2003 but earned promotion back to the premier grade in 2005 after an undefeated season in the 1B competition.

The Saint Kentigern 1st XV won back-to-back 1A titles in 2011 and 2012, secured its first Top 4 National Championship in 2012, and claimed consecutive Co-educational National Titles in 2010 and 2011. As a result of winning the Top 4 National Final, the 2013 1st XV was invited to the Sanix Youth World Invitational Tournament, held in early May, where they defeated Hartpury College to win the world championship title.

The Saint Kentigern 1st XV won their third consecutive Auckland 1A title in 2013 with a last-minute penalty, becoming the first team to achieve a three-peat in the competition. Saint Kentigern later won the Auckland 1A title again in 2015 and 2017. In 2019, the school won the Co-educational division of the National First XV Championship, defeating Feilding High School 29–22.

In 2018, Saint Kentigern's was excluded from the competition due to its recruiting practices by rival schools.

Saint Kentigern Old Boys currently playing at Super Rugby level include

- TJ Faiane,
- Sione Mafileo,
- Matt Duffie,
- Dalton Papalii,
- Sam Nock,
- Blake Gibson,
- Finlay Christie
- Tanielu Tele’a

Other former St. Kentigern Old Boys who play in the Super Rugby competition include:

- Etene Nanai-Seturo – Chiefs (rugby union),
- Tiaan Tauakipulu – New South Wales Waratahs,
- Ere Enari – Crusaders (rugby union),
- Braydon Ennor – Crusaders (rugby union),
- Pari Pari Parkinson – Highlanders (rugby union),
- Tevita Mafileo – Hurricanes (rugby union)
- Scott Scrafton – Hurricanes (rugby union).

In addition, several former students play in the Premiership Rugby in England and in the French rugby competition Top 14. There are also a couple of old boys playing in the National Rugby League, including the 2011 Saint Kentigern's College 1XV captain Albert Vete, and Suliasi Vunivalu who are both in the current Melbourne Storm team. Vunivalu has played 7 tests for the Wallabies and is currently based in France. Vunivalu was dubbed the highest try scorer for the club in 2016.

Other notable Saint Kentigern Old Boys are in the current New Zealand national under-20 rugby union team including Rivez Reihana, Tamaiti Williams, and Etene Nanai-Seturo. In 2019, Reihana and Williams were on the development side for the Chiefs and Crusaders, respectively. In July 2023, Williams made his debut for the All Blacks in the Rugby Championship, and in September, went on to play for them in the 2023 Rugby World Cup in France.

== Notable alumni ==
- Christopher Luxon (born 1970), 42nd New Zealand Prime Minister, politician, National leader.
- Kirstyn Goodger (born 1991), Olympic rower.
- Ross Keenan (born 1943), businessman.
- Dontae Russo-Nance (born 2005), basketball player.
- Tamaiti Williams (born 2000), All Black, rugby player.
