= Tamaiti Williams =

New Zealand rugby union player (born 2000)

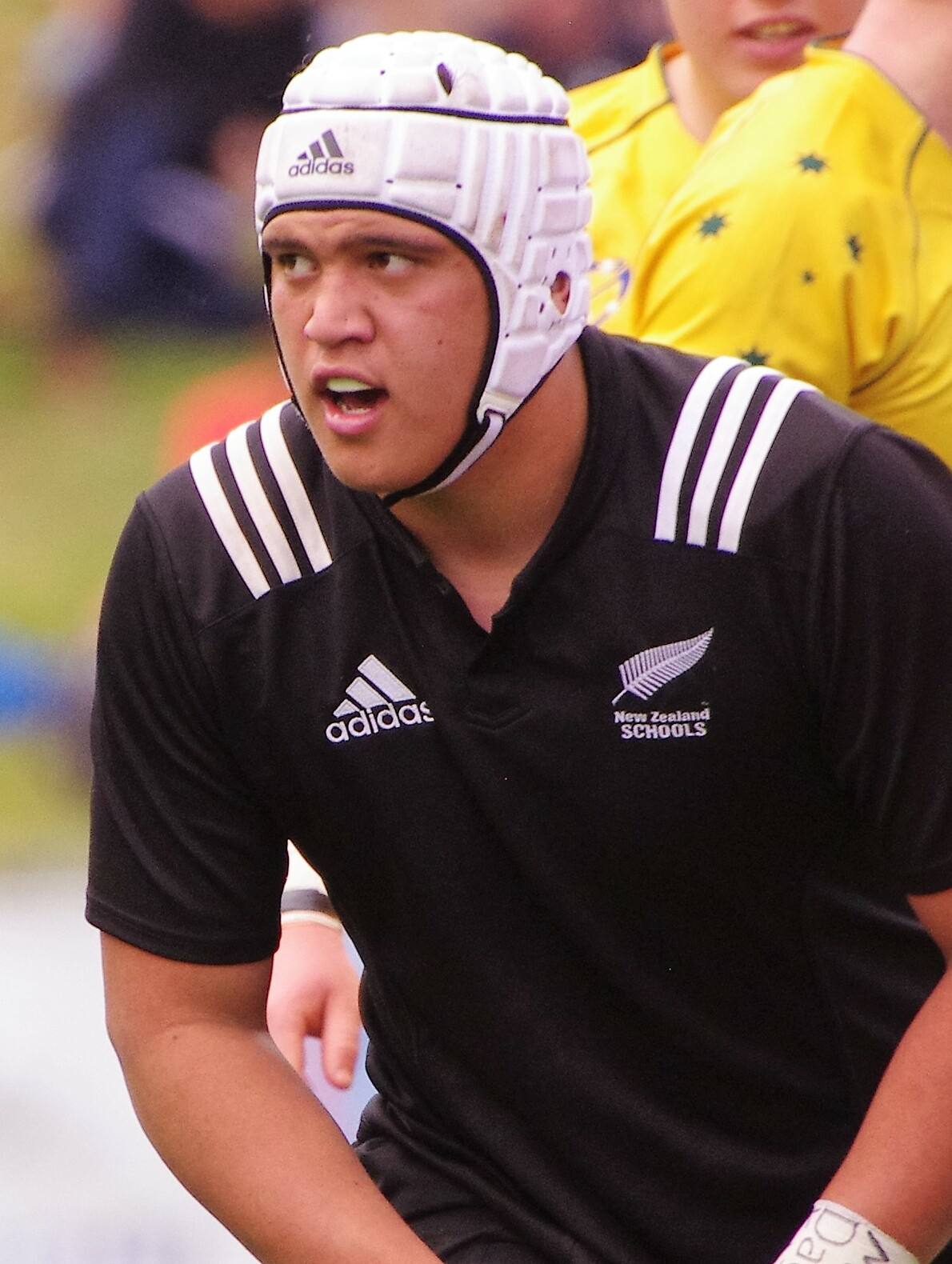
- Born: 10 August 2000 (age 26) Whangārei, New Zealand
- Height: 196 cm (6 ft 5 in)
- Weight: 144 kg (22 st 9 lb; 317 lb)
- School: St. Kentigern College
- Notable relative(s): Eric Rush (uncle); Brady Rush (cousin)

Rugby union career
- Position(s): Prop, Number 8
- Current team: Canterbury, Crusaders
Senior career
Years	Team	Apps	(Points)
2020–	Canterbury	20	(20)
2021–	Crusaders	42	(30)
- Correct as of 5 November 2024
International career
Years	Team	Apps	(Points)
2019	New Zealand U20	5	(15)
2020–2022	Māori All Blacks	5	(0)
2022	All Blacks XV	2	(0)
2023–	New Zealand	26	(20)
- Correct as of 5 November 2024

Tamaiti Patariki Thomas Williams (born 10 August 2000) is a New Zealand rugby union player who plays as a Prop for the Crusaders in Super Rugby and Canterbury in the Bunnings NPC.

== Early life ==
Williams was born in Whangārei, New Zealand to father Johnny and mother Natalie. Of Māori descent, he affiliates to the Ngāpuhi iwi. He has two sisters, Kenya and Terina. The family moved to Perth when he was only a few months old, where he later schooled at Aranmore Catholic College, playing both rugby union and rugby league for Western Australia. In 2016, the family returned to New Zealand to live in Kaeo in the Far North where he attended Kerikeri High School, playing for their Condor 7s team. This led to Williams earning a scholarship to attend Saint Kentigern College, for whom he continued to play rugby. Playing as a loose forward in his school days, Williams subsequently transitioned to the front row where he gained some experience at loosehead prop and has now settled at tighthead prop, though is capable of playing in both positions.

== Canterbury ==
Williams made his debut for Canterbury in Round 1 of the 2020 Mitre 10 Cup against North Harbour at QBE Stadium, Albany on the North Shore. Canterbury won the match 43–29. Between 2020 and 2022 Williams played 20 matches for Canterbury, starting 8 and scoring 4 tries.

== Crusaders ==
Williams caught the attention of Crusaders' scouts, leading him to decide to move to Christchurch at the end of 2019 to join their highly successful academy. He was named in the Crusaders squad for the 2021 Super Rugby Aotearoa season, making his debut that year, with the team going on to win the Championship. Between the 2022 and 2023 Super Rugby seasons, Williams made 31 appearances for the Crusaders and scored 4 tries. The Crusaders won the Championship both years.

== Māori All Blacks ==
On 24 November 2020 Māori All Blacks coach Clayton McMillan named his squad to play Moana Pasifika on 5 December, which included Williams for the first time. He was the youngest member of the team and made his debut as a replacement during the match which they won 28–21.

== International career ==
In 2022 Williams was included in the All Blacks XV for their Northern tour, where the team played against Ireland A, winning 47–19, and the Barbarians, losing 31–35.

Williams made his international test debut for New Zealand at Go Media Stadium on 15 July 2023 in a match against South Africa in The Rugby Championship, coming on as a replacement for Ethan de Groot in the 59th minute, with the All Blacks winning the match 35–20 and retaining the Freedom Cup.

Williams appeared for the All Blacks in his first Rugby World Cup match on 29 September 2023 in the Pool rounds against Italy at OL Stadium, coming on in the 49th minute as a replacement for Ofa Tuungafasi. New Zealand won the match 96–17.

At the same tournament he also played for the All Blacks in a pool match against Uruguay at OL Stadium, a quarterfinal match against Ireland and a semifinal match against Argentina, both played at Stade de France. On 6 October 2023 he scored his first try for the All Blacks in the 73rd minute of the pool match against Uruguay, coming on as a replacement for Ofa Tuungafasi in the 46th minute in a 73–0 win. On 14 October 2023, coming on as a replacement for Ethan de Groot in the 64th minute of the quarterfinal match against Ireland, he was part of the All Blacks' final defensive stand which, in the last three minutes of regular time and two minutes of overtime, saw them successfully defend their 4-point lead against 37 consecutive attacking phases by Ireland to win the match 28–24. Williams contributed to the match with 5 tackles at a 100 percent tackle success rate. This ended Ireland's 2023 Rugby World Cup campaign, their winning streak of 17 international test matches and their 15-month tenure as the World Rugby number 1 ranked men's rugby union team. In the 21 October 2023 semifinal match against Argentina, Williams came on as a replacement for Ethan de Groot in the 56th minute, with the All Blacks going on to win the match 44–6 to secure a place in the 2023 Rugby World Cup final.
