= Walter Pringle (rugby union) =

- Born: Walter Peter Pringle; 17 July 1869 Hutt Valley, New Zealand
- Died: 24 February 1945 (aged 75) Palmerston North, New Zealand
- Weight: 77 kg (170 lb)
- Notable relative: Codie Taylor (great-great-grandson)

Rugby union career
- Position: Forward
Provincial / State sides
Years	Team	Apps	(Points)
1891–99	Wellington		

Walter Peter Pringle (17 July 1869 – 24 February 1945) was a New Zealand rugby union player. A forward, Pringle represented Wellington at a provincial level. He was a member of the New Zealand national side on their 1893 tour of Australia, playing in five matches including against New South Wales and Queensland.
