= Will Jordan (rugby union) =

New Zealand international rugby union player

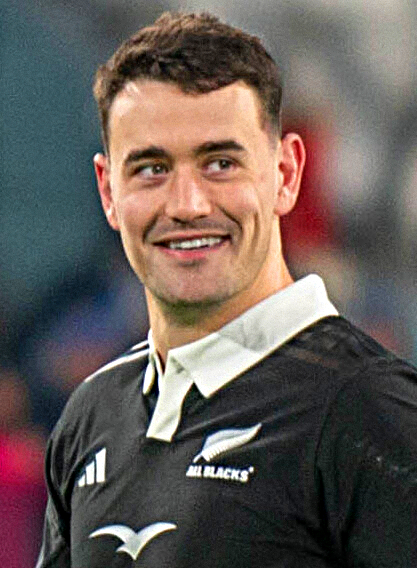
- Will Jordan playing for New Zealand against Italy in 2024
- Full name: William Thomas Jordan
- Born: 24 February 1998 (age 28) Christchurch, Canterbury, New Zealand
- Height: 1.88 m (6 ft 2 in)
- Weight: 94 kg (207 lb; 14 st 11 lb)
- School: Christchurch Boys' High School

Rugby union career
- Position(s): Fullback, Wing
- Current team: Tasman, Crusaders
Senior career
Years	Team	Apps	(Points)
2017–	Tasman	34	(110)
2019–	Crusaders	73	(245)
- Correct as of 8 November 2026
International career
Years	Team	Apps	(Points)
2017	New Zealand U20	7	(45)
2020	South Island	1	(10)
2020–	New Zealand	65	(280)
- Correct as of 21 November 2026
Medal record
Men's rugby union
Representing New Zealand
Rugby World Cup
Silver medal – second place	2023 France	Squad

William Thomas Jordan (born 24 February 1998) is a New Zealand rugby union player who plays as a fullback or wing for the Crusaders in Super Rugby, Tasman in the National Provincial Championship (NPC), and the New Zealand national team.

Jordan began his professional career with provincial side Tasman in 2017 and was signed by the Crusaders in 2018, making his debut in 2019 after missing the previous year with injury. Jordan quickly established himself as a starting player on the back of their title winning season (2018) before becoming their first choice fullback. He made his international debut for New Zealand in 2020 and holds a try ratio of 0.87, having scored 56 tries in 64 appearances, the most of any New Zealand player. Since 2024 Jordan has been talked up by numerous figures and outlets as one of the best fullbacks in the world.

== Early life ==
Jordan attended Fendalton Open Air School, then Cobham Intermediate School, then Christchurch Boys' High School. He played as fullback for the top side, and led the UC Championship in tries scored in 2015. Jordan enrolled at the University of Canterbury in 2016 to study Law and Commerce. He completed this degree in July of 2025.

== Club career ==
After a successful school career, Jordan made his debut for the Tasman Mako in Round 1 of the 2017 Mitre 10 Cup against Canterbury at Trafalgar Park in Nelson. He scored 6 tries during the 2017 Mitre 10 Cup, and was second in the tournament for clean breaks. Jordan made his debut for Super Rugby team the Crusaders in 2019 after missing the 2018 season with injury. Jordan was part of the Mako side which won the Mitre 10 Cup for the first time in 2019. He was named in the South Island squad for the North vs South rugby union match in 2020, starting in the number 14 jersey in a 38–35 win for the South.

Jordan played every minute and scored a try in the final of the 2021 Super Rugby Aotearoa season as the Crusaders won their fifth title in a row with a 24–13 win over the Chiefs. He had another outstanding 2022 Super Rugby Pacific season as the Crusaders made it six in a row with a 7–21 win over the Blues in the final.

== International career ==
Following the Super Rugby Aotearoa season and scoring two tries in the North v South game, he was selected for the All Blacks squad for the 2020 Rugby Championship.

Jordan made his All Blacks debut against Australia on 7 November 2020 in a 24–22 loss for New Zealand, becoming All Black number 1191. Jordan returned from injury for the final test of 2020 and scored 2 tries in a 38–0 win over Argentina. Jordan was again named in the All Blacks squad to play Tonga and Fiji in the July 2021 Steinlager Series. In the first game of the 2021 season for the All Blacks, Jordan scored 5 tries against Tonga at Mount Smart Stadium in a 102–0 win for the side. He scored another 3 tries later in the year against the United States of America in a 14–104 win for the All Blacks.

Jordan received the World Rugby Breakthrough Player of the Year Award in 2021.

On 11 July 2026, Jordan scored a hat-trick of tries in a 47–17 win against Italy in Wellington to become the highest ever try-scorer for the All Blacks, bringing up his 50th try and surpassing the previous record of 49 set by Doug Howlett 19 years previously.

== International tries ==
New Zealand score shown first.

As of 10 October 2026.

Since making his Test debut for the All Blacks in 2020, Jordan has scored 56 international tries at a rate of 0.90 per game. Jordan has become one of the most prolific try-scorers in international rugby and ranks as New Zealand's highest try-scorer, a feat he achieved in July 2026, and is fifth on the all-time list for international tries.

List of international tries
No.	Opponent	Location	Competition	Date	Result	Ref.
1	Argentina	Newcastle International Sports Centre, Newcastle (Australia)	2020 Tri Nations Series	28 November 2020	38–0	
2	Argentina	Newcastle International Sports Centre, Newcastle (Australia)	2020 Tri Nations Series	28 November 2020	38–0	
3	Tonga	Mount Smart Stadium, Auckland	2021 July Tests	3 July 2021	102–0	
4	Tonga	Mount Smart Stadium, Auckland	2021 July Tests	3 July 2021	102–0	
5	Tonga	Mount Smart Stadium, Auckland	2021 July Tests	3 July 2021	102–0	
6	Tonga	Mount Smart Stadium, Auckland	2021 July Tests	3 July 2021	102–0	
7	Tonga	Mount Smart Stadium, Auckland	2021 July Tests	3 July 2021	102–0	
8	Fiji	Forsyth Barr Stadium, Dunedin	2021 Fiji tour of New Zealand	10 July 2021	57–23	
9	Fiji	Waikato Stadium, Hamilton	2021 Fiji tour of New Zealand	17 July 2021	60–13	
10	Australia	Eden Park, Auckland	2021 Rugby Championship	14 August 2021	57–22	
11	Australia	Perth Stadium, Perth	2021 Rugby Championship	5 September 2021	38–21	
12	South Africa	North Queensland Stadium, Townsville (Australia)	2021 Rugby Championship	25 September 2021	19–17	
13	United States	FedExField, Landover	2021 end-of-year rugby union internationals	23 October 2021	104–14	
14	United States	FedExField, Landover	2021 end-of-year rugby union internationals	23 October 2021	104–14	
15	United States	FedExField, Landover	2021 end-of-year rugby union internationals	23 October 2021	104–14	
16	Wales	Millennium Stadium, Cardiff	2021 end-of-year rugby union internationals	30 October 2021	54–15	
17	Ireland	Aviva Stadium, Dublin	2021 end-of-year rugby union internationals	13 November 2021	20–29	
18	Ireland	Forsyth Barr Stadium, Dunedin	2022 Ireland tour of New Zealand	9 July 2022	12–23	
19	Ireland	Wellington Regional Stadium, Wellington	2022 Ireland tour of New Zealand	16 July 2022	22–32	
20	Australia	Docklands Stadium, Melbourne	2022 Rugby Championship	15 September 2022	39–37	
21	Australia	Eden Park, Auckland	2022 Rugby Championship	24 September 2022	40–14	
22	South Africa	Mount Smart Stadium, Auckland	2023 Rugby Championship	15 July 2023	35–20	
23	Australia	Melbourne Cricket Ground, Melbourne	2023 Rugby Championship	29 July 2023	38–7	
24	Italy^{(PS)}	Parc Olympique Lyonnais, Lyon (France)	2023 Rugby World Cup	29 September 2023	96–17	
25	Italy^{(PS)}	Parc Olympique Lyonnais, Lyon (France)	2023 Rugby World Cup	29 September 2023	96–17	
26	Uruguay^{(PS)}	Parc Olympique Lyonnais, Lyon (France)	2023 Rugby World Cup	5 October 2023	73–0	
27	Uruguay^{(PS)}	Parc Olympique Lyonnais, Lyon (France)	2023 Rugby World Cup	5 October 2023	73–0	
28	Ireland^{(QF)}	Stade de France, Saint-Denis (France)	2023 Rugby World Cup	14 October 2023	28–24	
29	Argentina^{(SF)}	Stade de France, Saint-Denis (France)	2023 Rugby World Cup	20 October 2023	44–6	
30	Argentina^{(SF)}	Stade de France, Saint-Denis (France)	2023 Rugby World Cup	20 October 2023	44–6	
31	Argentina^{(SF)}	Stade de France, Saint-Denis (France)	2023 Rugby World Cup	20 October 2023	44–6	
32	Argentina	Eden Park, Auckland	2024 Rugby Championship	17 August 2024	42–10	
33	Argentina	Eden Park, Auckland	2024 Rugby Championship	17 August 2024	42–10	
34	Australia	Stadium Australia, Sydney	2024 Rugby Championship	21 September 2024	31–28	
35	Australia	Wellington Regional Stadium, Wellington	2024 Rugby Championship	28 September 2024	33–13	
36	England	Twickenham Stadium, London	2024 end-of-year rugby union internationals	2 November 2024	24–22	
37	Ireland	Aviva Stadium, Dublin	2024 end-of-year rugby union internationals	8 November 2024	23–13	
38	Italy	Juventus Stadium, Turin	2024 end-of-year rugby union internationals	23 November 2024	29–11	
39	France	Forsyth Barr Stadium, Dunedin	2025 France tour of New Zealand	5 July 2025	31–27	
40	France	Forsyth Barr Stadium, Dunedin	2025 France tour of New Zealand	5 July 2025	31–27	
41	France	Wellington Regional Stadium, Wellington	2025 France tour of New Zealand	12 July 2025	43–17	
42	France	Waikato Stadium, Hamilton	2025 France tour of New Zealand	19 July 2025	29–19	
43	South Africa	Eden Park, Auckland	2025 Rugby Championship	6 September 2025	24–17	
44	Scotland	Murrayfield Stadium, Edinburgh	2025 end-of-year rugby union internationals	8 November 2025	25–17	
45	England	Twickenham Stadium, London	2025 end-of-year rugby union internationals	15 November 2025	19–33	
46	France	Te Kaha, Christchurch	2026 Nations Championship	4 July 2026	34–32	
47	France	Te Kaha, Christchurch	2026 Nations Championship	4 July 2026	34–32	
48	Italy	Wellington Regional Stadium, Wellington	2026 Nations Championship	11 July 2026	47–17	
49	Italy	Wellington Regional Stadium, Wellington	2026 Nations Championship	11 July 2026	47–17	
50	Italy	Wellington Regional Stadium, Wellington	2026 Nations Championship	11 July 2026	47–17	
51	Ireland	Eden Park, Auckland	2026 Nations Championship	18 July 2026	40–21	
52	South Africa	Ellis Park, Johannesburg	2026 Greatest Rivalry Series	22 August 2026	33–16	
53	South Africa	Ellis Park, Johannesburg	2026 Greatest Rivalry Series	22 August 2026	33–16	
54	South Africa	FNB Stadium, Johannesburg	2026 Greatest Rivalry Series	5 September 2026	24–29	
55	South Africa	M&T Bank Stadium, Baltimore	2026 Greatest Rivalry Series	12 September 2026	28–43	
56	Australia	Eden Park, Auckland	2026 Bledisloe Cup	10 October 2026	50–19	

== Honours ==
=== Crusaders ===
- Super Rugby: 2019, 2022, 2023, 2025
- Super Rugby Aotearoa: 2020, 2021

=== New Zealand ===
- The Rugby Championship: 2021, 2022, 2023
- Bledisloe Cup: 2021 - 2026
- Rugby World Cup: runner-up 2023
