= Shannon Frizell =

New Zealand rugby union player

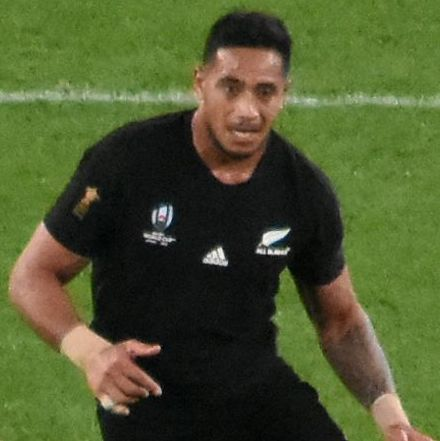
- Full name: Shannon Michael Frizell
- Born: 11 February 1994 (age 32) Folaha, Tonga
- Height: 195 cm (6 ft 5 in)
- Weight: 114 kg (251 lb; 17 st 13 lb)
- School: 'Apifo'ou College
- Notable relative: Tyson Frizell (brother)

Rugby union career
- Position(s): Flanker, Lock, Number 8
- Current team: Tasman, Highlanders
Senior career
Years	Team	Apps	(Points)
2016–2023, 2026–	Tasman	39	(55)
2018–2023, 2027–	Highlanders	68	(95)
2023–2026	Toshiba Brave Lupus	37	(105)
- Correct as of 17 October 2026
International career
Years	Team	Apps	(Points)
2014	Tonga U20	4	(5)
2018–2023, 2026–	New Zealand	35	(40)
2020	South Island	1	(0)
2025	ANZAC XV	1	(0)
- Correct as of 17 October 2026
Medal record
Men's Rugby union
Representing New Zealand
Rugby World Cup
Bronze medal – third place	2019 Japan	Squad
Silver medal – second place	2023 France	Squad

Shannon Michael Frizell (born 11 February 1994) is a Tongan born New Zealand rugby union player. His position is flanker.

== Early life ==
Frizell was born and raised in Folaha, Tonga and started his childhood playing association football for Folaha Football Club as a goalkeeper. He played for Tonga's U17 and U20 football teams.

His adoptive brother, Tyson Frizell, plays in the National Rugby League. In 2010 and 2011 he played for the Tonga national under-17 football team. He represented the Tonga national under-17 football team at the 2011 OFC U-17 Championship in New Zealand.

== Playing career ==
=== Early career ===
In 2011, he switched from Football to Rugby, he started playing for 'Apifo'ou College and represented Tonga U20 at the IRB Junior World Rugby Trophy in 2014, before moving to New Zealand in 2015, initially on a development contract with Tasman.

=== 2018–2019 ===
On 20 April 2018, Frizell scored three tries against the Blues in a Super Rugby match at Eden Park. His performances for the Highlanders earned him a call up for New Zealand's national rugby team, the All Blacks, having been tipped by the media for an unlikely All Black debut.

With injury to Vaea Fifita, Frizell made his debut for the All Blacks on 23 June 2018 against France. Frizell started the game at blindside flanker, playing 71 minutes on debut. Frizell had to be taken to the blood bin in the 22nd minute, due to an eye injury, so was temporarily replaced by Highlanders teammate Jackson Hemopo, who was also on debut for New Zealand. Frizell came back on in the 31st minute and stayed on for the rest of the test, which the All Blacks won 49–14.

Frizell went on to start three times for the All Blacks during the 2018 Rugby Championship, in the absence of the injured regular starter, Liam Squire. Frizell was one of the standout performers in the first test against Argentina, on 8 September, playing the full 80 minutes at his homeground in Nelson, scoring his first try for the All Blacks as they won 46–24. Frizell unfortunately failed to make an impact in the final two tests of the competition, including the 32–30 victory over South Africa, on 6 October. It was 6–6 at halftime, with Frizell subbed off 46 minutes into the test.

With Vaea Fifita recalled, Frizell was dropped for the All Blacks end of year tour in 2018. Rookies Gareth Evans, Dillon Hunt and Dalton Papalii were also chosen over Frizell.

After some strong performances in the 2019 Super Rugby season, where he was among the highest try scorers, with six tries, Frizell earned a recall for New Zealand's 39 man Rugby Championship squad.

In July 2019, Frizell and four other players, including Highlanders teammate, Josh Ioane, were dropped from the All Blacks, having performed poorly against South Africa in a 16–16 draw. Frizell was released to Tasman for the 2019 Mitre 10 Cup.

Luke Jacobson's concussion problems continued, which ruled him out of the 2019 Rugby World Cup, to Frizell's benefit. Frizell immediately flew to Japan after Jacobson's injury, to rejoin the 31 man All Blacks squad. He played 1 match off the bench versus South Africa and started against Canada and Namibia scoring a try in the Canada test.

In 2021, Frizell was charged with two counts of assault against a woman, and a further one against a man. On May 9, 2021, Frizell had attacked and punched the two individuals. He also sent an abusive social media message to a friend of one of the victims. A conviction was not recorded after he pled guilty and completed police diversion. He missed several games for the case, though he was only stood down for one.

=== 2020–2023 ===
Frizell was named in the South Island squad for the North vs South rugby union match in 2020, starting in the number 6 jersey in a 38–35 win for the South.

He continued his stay in the All Blacks, named in the squad for the 2020 Rugby Championship Frizell established himself as the first choice number 6 with starts against Australia in a 16–16 draw, a 27–7 win and a 5–43 win.

Frizell was one of the best players during the 2021 Super Rugby Aotearoa season and was again named in the All Blacks squad to play Tonga and Fiji in the July Steinlager Series.

In Round 1 of the 2022 Super Rugby Pacific season Frizell played his 50th game for the Highlanders against the Chiefs. 2022 would go on to be a successful season for Frizell, who put behind the off-field issues of 2021 to reclaim his place as the first-choice blindside flanker during the 2022 Rugby Championship; after missing a mid-year series against Ireland due to injury.

After a series of strong performances in the 2023 Rugby Championship, including a Man of the Match effort against South Africa, during a 35–20 win in Auckland, Frizell was named in Ian Foster's 33 man squad for the 2023 Rugby World Cup. Frizell played five times during the tournament, scoring two tries against Argentina in the semifinals, to bring his test try scoring total for 2023, to four. After being yellow carded in the World Cup final; his final test match, Frizell was replaced by Sam Whitelock in the 55th minute, with New Zealand collecting a silver medal after a 11–12 loss.

== Honours ==
New Zealand

- Rugby World Cup / Webb Ellis Cup
  - Third-place: 2019
  - Second-place: 2023
