= Codie Taylor =

New Zealand rugby union player

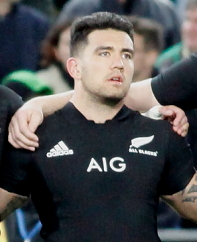
- Taylor representing New Zealand during the Rugby Championship
- Full name: Codie Joshua Dane Taylor
- Born: 31 March 1991 (age 35) Levin, New Zealand
- Height: 1.83 m (6 ft 0 in)
- Weight: 108 kg (238 lb; 17 st 0 lb)
- School: Horowhenua College 4 years Feilding High School 1 year
- Notable relative: Walter Pringle (great-great-grandfather)

Rugby union career
- Position: Hooker
- Current team: Canterbury, Crusaders
Senior career
Years	Team	Apps	(Points)
2012–	Canterbury	24	(35)
2013–	Crusaders	157	(270)
- Correct as of 14 September 2026
International career
Years	Team	Apps	(Points)
2011	New Zealand U20	5	(0)
2014	Māori All Blacks	2	(5)
2015–	New Zealand	116	(125)
- Correct as of 21 November 2026
Medal record
Men's Rugby union
Representing New Zealand
Rugby World Cup
Gold medal – first place	2015 England	Squad
Bronze medal – third place	2019 Japan	Squad
Silver medal – second place	2023 France	Squad

Codie Joshua Dane Taylor (born 31 March 1991) is a New Zealand professional rugby union player, who currently plays as a hooker for the Crusaders in Super Rugby and is contracted to Canterbury for New Zealand's domestic National Provincial Championship competition. He represents New Zealand internationally.

== Club career ==
Taylor played his 50th game for the Crusaders during the 2017 Super Rugby season and earned a start against the touring British & Irish Lions on 10 June 2017. The Crusaders' fixture against the Lions was a low-scoring 12–3 loss for the Crusaders, with Taylor being subbed off in the 50th minute. Taylor's incredible performances throughout the Super Rugby season saw him start in all three of the knockout rounds of the competition, where he made a big impact. Taylor scored one of only two tries in the quarter-final, as the Crusaders beat the Highlanders 17–0 at home in Christchurch. Taylor performed well in the 2017 Super Rugby Final, on 5 August 2017, with the Crusaders beating the Johannesburg-based Lions 25–17 to claim their eighth Super Rugby title.

== International career ==
=== 2011–2015 ===
Taylor was part of the Junior All Blacks team which won the 2011 IRB Junior World Championship.

Of Ngāti Raukawa and Muaūpoko descent, Taylor played for the Māori All Blacks in 2014.

Taylor was selected for the All Blacks 2015 Squad, having surpassed Ben Funnell as the Crusaders' first-choice hooker during the 2015 Super Rugby season. His first game for the All Blacks was the opening match of the 2015 Rugby Championship against Argentina, when he came off the bench in the 59th minute to replace the now-retired veteran Keven Mealamu. He scored a try on debut, in the 71st minute, after the All Blacks won a scrum close to the Argentine line.

Taylor was named in the All Blacks 31-man squad to go to the Rugby World Cup 2015 in England. Taylor only made one appearance in the competition during the pool stages, which was New Zealand and Namibia's first international fixture. Taylor lasted the whole 80 minutes against Namibia and was not replaced by Mealamu, ending the test by scoring a try in the 79th minute. First-five Beauden Barrett converted Taylor's try to make the final score 58–14.

=== 2016–2019 ===
Taylor surpassed the injury-plagued Nathan Harris as regular back-up to the All Blacks' starting hooker Dane Coles off the bench in 2016, following Keven Mealamu's retirement after the 2015 Rugby World Cup's conclusion. Taylor also notably earned a start against Australia in the first match of the 2016 Rugby Championship, but was unfortunately subbed off after three minutes of play for a head injury assessment and was replaced by Coles. Taylor did not return to the field that match and James Parsons was temporarily re-called to the All Blacks during Taylor's recovery from injury.

Taylor had notable involvement in the 57–15 win against South Africa in Durban on 6 October 2016, scoring a try off a driving maul and also receiving a yellow card long after the full-time had passed, following a head-high tackle on Springboks fullback Patrick Lambie. Taylor also earned another start for the All Blacks later that year in the 68–10 victory over Italy, making his way for debutant Liam Coltman in the 66th minute.

In 2017, also had a huge workload for the All Blacks. Taylor stepped up to the role of being a regular starter for the All Blacks following Dane Coles' 5 months out with a concussion. This saw Taylor starting in all three historic tests against the British & Irish Lions, where Taylor scored the first try of the series after being set up to score, by Crusaders team-mate, winger Israel Dagg, with Taylor's try enabling the All Blacks to win the first test 30–15. The All Blacks unfortunately failed to win against the Lions, in the next two tests in the series, with the two teams drawing the series. Taylor kept the starting role at Hooker until Coles returned to international rugby on 26 August 2017, which was a 35–29 win, against Australia, that Taylor took part in off the bench.

After Coles was injured again, against France on the end-of-year tour, Taylor started twice more in 2017, starting in wins against Scotland and Wales. Taylor ended the 2017 season as New Zealand's clear first-choice hooker and was the only player in the All Blacks squad that played in every single test of 2017, seven as a starter and seven as a substitute for Coles off the bench. Taylor's opening try against Scotland on 18 November 2017, a 22–17 win over Scotland, also saw him finish the year as the All Blacks' highest try scorer of the forward pack, with four tries in the 2017 season.

Taylor earned the award for Man of the Match against France on 9 June 2018, after what was arguably the best individual performance in Taylor's whole career saw him score a try in the 52nd minute and also set up outside backs Rieko Ioane, Damian McKenzie and Ben Smith for tries, with the latter of them scoring his 30th test try off Taylor's pass. Taylor's outstanding 63-minute performance saw him earn mass acclaim from media and saw the All Blacks beat France 52–11 to open their 2018 season. Taylor backed up his performance in the first test against France by starting in the next two tests against France as well, with the All Blacks winning the series 3–0.

Taylor went into the 2018 Rugby Championship in excellent form, having won another Super Rugby title with the Crusaders prior to the competition. Although the Crusaders managed to beat South Africa's Lions for the second year in a row in the Super Rugby Final, such an effort was not replicated internationally. Taylor was one of the few All Blacks to shine in round four of the Rugby Championship, with the All Blacks suffering a shock 34–36 loss to South Africa. Taylor exploited the slow speed of Frans Malherbe and his opposite, Malcolm Marx, to set up Aaron Smith's try and also scored one for himself in the 60th minute. Taylor's performance was not enough to spark a late comeback however, with Beauden Barrett performing poorly in goal-kicking, as opposed to Man-of-the-Match Handre Pollard. Although visibly fatigued from a huge workload, Taylor was retained in the starting lineup for the second test against South Africa, which was a late 32–30 win thanks to an Ardie Savea try. Taylor's great performance saw the All Blacks win the Rugby Championship once again.

With New Zealand's ranking as the best rugby team in the world on the line during the 2018 end-of-year tour, Head Coach, Steve Hansen, opted to keep Taylor as the first-choice hooker, despite the ageing Dane Coles coming back from a long injury-enforced break.

Having started in every single test during 2018, Taylor was rested for 3 November Japan test. Taylor was then predictably named in the starting lineup for the Hillary Shield test against England, which was a narrow 16–15 win over England, an opponent that the All Blacks had not played since 2014. Having defeated England, the All Blacks played against Ireland the next week of the tour, on 17 November 2018. Ireland, ranked second in the world, went into half time ahead of the All Blacks however and Taylor was replaced by Dane Coles in the 46th minute of the test. The All Blacks went on to lose to Ireland, who are set to top the world rankings in 2019.

After a long season in 2018, Taylor was named the Tom French Memorial Māori Player of the Year at the New Zealand Rugby Awards. Taylor was also nominated for the Kelvin R Tremain Memorial Player of the Year trophy, awarded to the best New Zealand rugby player, but lost out on the award to Black Ferns Sevens' halfback, Kendra Cocksedge.

Following the 2019 Super Rugby season, Taylor played in four of New Zealand's warm-up tests prior to the World Cup, including their record 26-47 defeat at the hands of Australia during the 2019 Rugby Championship.

All Blacks Head Coach, Steve Hansen named Taylor in New Zealand's 31-man squad for the 2019 Rugby World Cup on 28 August 2019, with the competition set to be Taylor's second World Cup.

Taylor played five tests at the World Cup and went on to start in the quarter-final against Ireland. Taylor scored a try in the 46-14 win, which saw New Zealand progress to the semi-finals. The semi-final saw Taylor, as well as England number 8, Billy Vunipola, play their 50th test. Despite praise from fellow All Black Dane Coles, prior to the test, Taylor performed poorly against England, who beat New Zealand and eliminated them from the competition. New Zealand lost to England 7-19.

=== 2020–present ===
On 13 November 2022, Taylor led the Ka Mate version of the Haka for his first time.

== Personal life ==
Taylor is the great-great-grandson of All Blacks player Walter Pringle.

Having grown up in Feilding and Levin before moving to Christchurch, he was a member of the Crusaders Wider Training Squad for the 2012 Super Rugby season and he has subsequently been promoted to the senior squad for the 2013 season, before making his international debut in 2015.

Taylor was the winner of Tom French Cup in 2018. He was also a nominee for the New Zealand Rugby Player of the Year in 2018.

Taylor is a New Zealander of Māori descent (Muaūpoko, Ngati Raukawa and Ngati Toa descent) and in 2015 he discovered that he is a direct descendant of the creators of Ka Mate, the All-Blacks' famous haka

== Career statistics ==
=== List of international tries ===
Try	Date	Venue	Opponent	Result	Competition
1	17 July 2015	AMI Stadium, Christchurch, New Zealand	Argentina	39–18 (won)	2015 Rugby Championship
2	24 September 2015	Olympic Stadium, London, England	Namibia	58–14 (won)	2015 Rugby World Cup
3	8 October 2016	Kings Park Stadium, Durban, South Africa	South Africa	57–15 (won)	2016 Rugby Championship
4	16 June 2017	Eden Park, Auckland, New Zealand	Samoa	78–0 (won)	2017 mid-year-internationals
5	24 June 2017	Eden Park, Auckland, New Zealand	British & Irish Lions	30–15 (won)	2017 British & Irish Lions tour to New Zealand
6	16 September 2017	North Harbour Stadium, Albany, New Zealand	South Africa	57–0 (won)	2017 Rugby Championship
7	18 November 2017	Murrayfield Stadium, Edinburgh, Scotland	Scotland	22–17 (won)	2017 end-of-year internationals
8	9 June 2018	Eden Park, Auckland, New Zealand	France	52–11 (won)	2018 mid-year internationals
9	15 September 2018	Westpac Stadium, Wellington, New Zealand	South Africa	34–36 (lost)	2018 Rugby Championship
10	7 September 2019	FMG Stadium, Hamilton, New Zealand	Tonga	92-7 (won)	2019 Rugby World Cup warm-up matches
11	19 October 2019	Yokohama Stadium, Yokohama, Japan	Ireland	46-14 (won)	2019 Rugby World Cup
12	7 November 2020	Suncorp Stadium, Brisbane, Australia	Australia	22-24 (lost)	2020 Tri Nations Series
13-14	14 August 2021	Eden Park, Auckland, New Zealand	Australia	57-22 (won)	2021 Rugby Championship
15	13 November 2021	Aviva Stadium, Dublin, Ireland	Ireland	20-29 (lost)	2021 end-of-year internationals
16	24 September 2022	Eden Park, Auckland, New Zealand	Australia	40-14 (won)	2022 Rugby Championship
17-18	5 November 2022	Millennium Stadium, Cardiff, Wales	Wales	55-23 (won)	2022 end-of-year internationals
19	19 November 2022	Twickenham Stadium, London, England	England	25-25 (draw)	2022 end-of-year internationals
20	29 July 2023	Melbourne Cricket Ground, Melbourne, Australia	Australia	38-7 (won)	2023 Rugby Championship
21	31 August 2024	Ellis Park Stadium, Johannesburg, South Africa	South Africa	27–31 (lost)	2024 Rugby Championship

Updated: 5 November 2024 Source:

== Honours ==
=== International ===
- Rugby World Cup / Webb Ellis Cup
  - Winners: 2015
  - Runner-up: 2023
  - Third-place: 2019
- Tri Nations/The Rugby Championship
  - Winners: 2016, 2017, 2018, 2020, 2021, 2022, 2023
  - Runners-up: 2015
- Bledisloe Cup
  - Winners: 2015, 2016, 2017, 2018, 2019, 2020, 2021, 2022, 2023
- Dave Gallaher Trophy
  - Winners: 2016, 2017, 2018
- Freedom Cup
  - Winners: 2015, 2016, 2017, 2018, 2019, 2021, 2022, 2023
- Hillary Shield
  - Winners: 2018, 2022, 2024
- British & Irish Lions series
  - Winners: 2017 (drawn series – shared title)
- World Rugby Team of the Year (New Zealand)
  - Winners: 2015, 2016, 2017
- Laureus Team of the Year (New Zealand)
  - Winners: 2016
- All Blacks Test Centurion

=== Super Rugby ===
- Super Rugby Centurion
- Super Rugby Champion: 2017, 2018, 2019, 2022, 2023, 2025

Awards
Preceded by Rieko Ioane	Tom French Memorial; Māori rugby union player of the year 2018	Succeeded by Sarah Hirini
