= North vs South rugby union match =

Recurring rugby match in New Zealand

The North vs South match, sometimes known as the Interisland match, was a longstanding rugby union fixture in New Zealand between the North Island and South Island teams.

The first match was played on 30 June 1897 at Wellington's Athletic Park, and the match became an annual fixture from 1902. Matches ceased during World War I from 1915 to 1918, but during World War II only the 1940, 1941 and 1942 matches were cancelled, with competition resuming in 1943. The last annual match on a regular basis was played in 1986.

A one-off match was played at Dunedin's Forsyth Barr Stadium in 2012 to help fundraise for the financially troubled Otago Rugby Football Union, which was won by the South 32–24.

A second one-off match was initially scheduled to be held on 29 August 2020, but due to the COVID-19 pandemic restrictions, it was postponed to 5 September 2020.

Most early matches were played in one of the four main cities (Auckland and Wellington in the North Island, Christchurch and Dunedin in the South Island), but from 1970 onwards the fixture was rotated around a number of provincial centres.

== Colours ==
In the very first match in 1897, the North Island wore yellow and black jerseys, while the South Island team wore all black.

Since 1904 the North Island traditionally played in black jerseys and black shorts, while the South Island played in white jerseys with white shorts.

== List of results ==
Year	Date	Venue	Winner	Score
1897	June 26	Wellington	North	16—3
1898-1901	Not played			
1902	September 13	Wellington	South	20—14
1903	August 26	Auckland	South	12—5
1904	September 24	Dunedin	Draw	3—3
1905	June 3	Wellington	North	26—0
1906	August 26	Wellington	North	9—5
1907	June 3	Christchurch	North	11—0
1908	June 24	Wellington	North	12—5
1909	August 25	Wellington	South	19—11
1910	September 24	Christchurch	South	14—10
1911	October 7	Wellington	North	19—9
1912	July 13	Napier	North	12—8
1913	July 26	Christchurch	South	25—0
1914	June 20	Wellington	South	8—0
1915-18	Not played			
1919	September 20	Wellington	North	28—11
1920	June 26	Wellington	North	12—3
1921	July 2	Christchurch	North	28—13
1922	July 1	Auckland	South	9—8
1923	August 4	Wellington	Draw	6—6
1924	May 31	Wellington	North	39—8
1925	July 25	Invercargill	North	16—5
1926	June 12	Wellington	North	41—9
1927	October 1	Wellington	South	31—30
1928	August 18	Christchurch	South	15—14
1929	September 27	Wellington	North	29—20
1930	Not played			
1931	August 15	Wellington	Draw	20—20
1932	June 4	Christchurch	North	28—10
1933	September 29	Wellington	North	27—18
1934	September 29	Dunedin	South	27—10
1935	September 28	Wellington	North	15—9
1936	August 15	Christchurch	North	17—6
1937	July 10	Wellington	South	30—21
1938	June 11	Wellington	South	23-3
1939	September 23	Wellington	South	25—19
1940-42	Not played			
1943	August 14	Wellington	South	17—16
1944	September 16	Christchurch	North	28—3
1945	August 25	Auckland	South	31—19
1946	August 17	Wellington	North	8—3
1947	October 4	Invercargill	North	13—11
1948	October 2	Wellington	South	12—11
1949	October 1	Christchurch	North	23—3
1950	September 23	Auckland	North	10—8
1951	May 26	Wellington	North	14—12
1952	July 12	Dunedin	South	11—3
1953	September 12	Wellington	North	15—14
1954	June 19	Christchurch	North	13—9
1955	July 23	Wellington	North	15—9
1956	May 26	Wellington	South	13—11
1957	August 17	Auckland	North	19—3
1958	August 2	Dunedin	North	13—6
1959	June 13	Wellington	North	30—14
1960	September 3	Christchurch	South	26—11
1961	June 24	Wellington	North	25—3
1962	July 28	Christchurch	South	17—14
1963	August 10	Christchurch	South	14—13
1964	July 4	Auckland	North	12—9
1965	June 9	Wellington	North	25—14
1966	May 28	Hamilton	North	12—3
1967	August 5	Dunedin	North	17—6
1968	August 31	Christchurch	North	34—17
1969	September 13	Wellington	South	13—3
1970	September 12	Nelson	North	11—6
1971	September 11	New Plymouth	North	31—9
1972	July 15	Christchurch	North	19—8
1973	June 16	Whangārei	North	27—14
1974	September 14	Auckland	North	22—0
1975	September 13	Christchurch	South	17—14
1976	September 11	Hamilton	South	20—16
1977	September 10	Dunedin	South	6—4
1978	September 23	New Plymouth	North	29—13
1979	August 11	Invercargill	North	9—3
1980	August 2	Palmerston North	North	13—9
1981	July 18	Dunedin	North	10—4
1982	July 10	Wanganui	South	22—12
1983	September 3	Blenheim	North	22—9
1984	May 26	Rotorua	North	39—3
1985	May 11	New Plymouth	North	29—12
1986	June 18	Oamaru	North	22-10
1987-94	Not played			
1995	April 8	Dunedin	North	63-22
1996-2011	Not played			
2012	June 10	Dunedin	South	32-24
2013-2019	Not played			
2020	September 5	Wellington	South	38-35
2021 onwards	Not played			

Sources:

- (1897-1934):
- Lambert, M. and Palenski, R. 4th Air New Zealand Almanac, Moa Alamanac Press 1985. ISBN 0-908570-91-0

Date	Winner	Venue	Result	Tries	Goals	Attendance	Reference
30 June 1897	North Island	Athletic Park, Wellington	16–3	North: W. Hardcastle, A. Humphries, W. Roberts; South: P. Priest	North: A. Humphries (3)	N/A	
13 September 1969	South Island	Athletic Park, Wellington	3–13	North: M. O'Callaghan; South: I. Kirkpatrick, P. Gard	South: F. McCormick (3)	N/A	
10 June 2012	South Island	Forsyth Barr Stadium, Dunedin	32–24	North: R. Robinson (2), S. Stowers; South: K. Baker (2), T. Marshall, M. Todd, A. Whitelock	North: L. Munro (3), R. Robinson; South: K. Baker (3)	7,427	
5 September 2020	South Island	Sky Stadium, Wellington	38–35	North: R. Ioane (2), D. McKenzie, A. Smith, A. Dixon; South: W. Jordan (2), N. Laulala, J. Barrett, T. Lomax	North: D. McKenzie (5); South: J. Barrett (6)	0	

== Summary of results ==
Details	Played	Won by North Island	Won by South Island	Drawn	North Island points	South Island points
In the North Island	50	31	17	2	940	637
In the South Island	31	19	11	1	517	358
Overall	81	50	28	3	1457	995
