= Finlay Christie =

New Zealand rugby union player (born 1995)

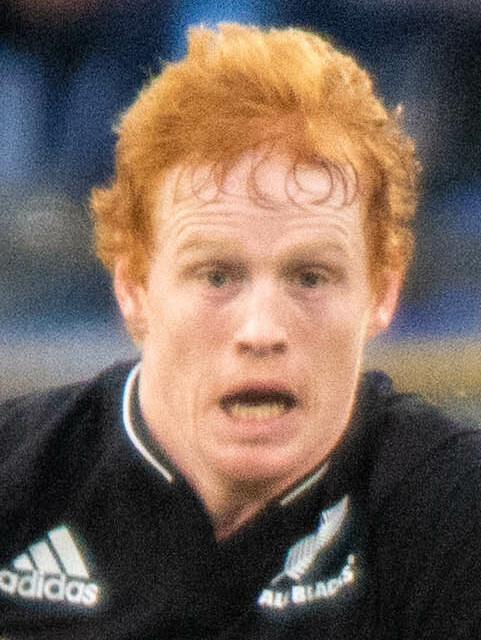
- Christie representing New Zealand during the 2021 November Internationals
- Full name: Finlay Turner Christie
- Born: 19 September 1995 (age 31) Peebles, Scottish Borders, Scotland
- Height: 1.77 m (5 ft 10 in)
- Weight: 82 kg (181 lb; 12 st 13 lb)
- School: St. Kentigern College

Rugby union career
- Position: Halfback
- Current team: Tasman, Blues
Senior career
Years	Team	Apps	(Points)
2016–	Tasman	61	(50)
2017	Chiefs	9	(0)
2018–2019	Hurricanes	14	(5)
2020–	Blues	84	(85)
- Correct as of 14 June 2026
International career
Years	Team	Apps	(Points)
2021–	New Zealand	28	(5)
2024	All Blacks XV	2	(5)
- Correct as of 14 June 2026
Medal record
Men's Rugby union
Representing New Zealand
Rugby World Cup
Silver medal – second place	2023 France	Squad

Finlay Turner Christie (born 19 September 1995) is a Scottish-born New Zealand rugby union player who plays as a halfback for Tasman in the Bunnings NPC and the Blues in Super Rugby. Born in Scotland, he represents New Zealand at international level after qualifying on residency grounds.

== Early life ==
Christie was born in Peebles in Scotland, and moved to New Zealand aged 7, settling in the town of Pukekohe. He shone at gymnastics and rugby during his schooldays. Christie attended Saint Kentigern College where he played for the college's top side. He represented Counties Manukau at under 19 level before heading south to Christchurch for university. In 2016 he was awarded the Hawkins Medal as Canterbury's top club rugby player for his performances for the University of Canterbury.

== Club career ==
=== Provincial ===
Christie's performances at club level saw him sign with Mitre 10 Cup side Tasman for the 2016 Mitre 10 Cup season. Christie made his debut in Round 1 against Waikato at Lansdowne Park in Blenheim scoring a try. He was part of the Tasman side that won the Mitre 10 Cup for the first time in 2019. In Round 9 of the 2020 Mitre 10 Cup Christie played his 50th game for the Mako against Canterbury at Lansdowne Park in Blenheim. The Mako went on to win their second premiership title in a row with Christie playing every minute of the 12–13 victory over Auckland in the final at Eden Park.

=== Super Rugby ===
Following his impressive first season at provincial level, he signed with Super Rugby side the Chiefs ahead of the 2017 Super Rugby season. At the end of the 2017 season Christie signed with the Hurricanes for the 2018 Super Rugby season. In 2018 Christie made 6 appearances for the Hurricanes scoring a try on debut against the Sunwolves in Wellington. He played a further 8 matches for the Hurricanes in the 2019 Super Rugby season before moving to the Blues for the 2020 Super Rugby season. He was out injured before the season was cancelled, but then played in the Super Rugby Aotearoa competition making his Blues debut against his old team the Hurricanes at Eden Park. Christie was named in the South Island squad for the North vs South rugby union match in 2020 coming off the bench in a 38–35 win for the South. Christie had an outstanding 2021 Super Rugby season particularly during the Super Rugby Trans-Tasman competition where he started all of the Blues 6 games as they won the competition with a 23–15 win over the Highlanders in the final. He had a very good 2022 Super Rugby Pacific season as the Blues made it to the final where they lost 7–21 to the Crusaders. He missed most of the 2024 Super Rugby Pacific season through injury, but came back to play a starring role in the Grand Final, where he set up Caleb Clarke for one of his hat trick of tries, as the Blues went on to win their 4th title, beating neighbours, the Chiefs, by 41–10, and ending a 21-year title drought.

== International career ==
After the 2021 Super Rugby season, Christie was named in the New Zealand squad to play Tonga and Fiji in the July Steinlager Series. He made his debut against Tonga at Mount Smart Stadium, coming off the bench in a 102–0 win, becoming All Black number 1196. He played a further four test matches in 2021 and was again selected for the All Blacks in 2022.
