= Tupou Vaa'i =

NZ international rugby union player

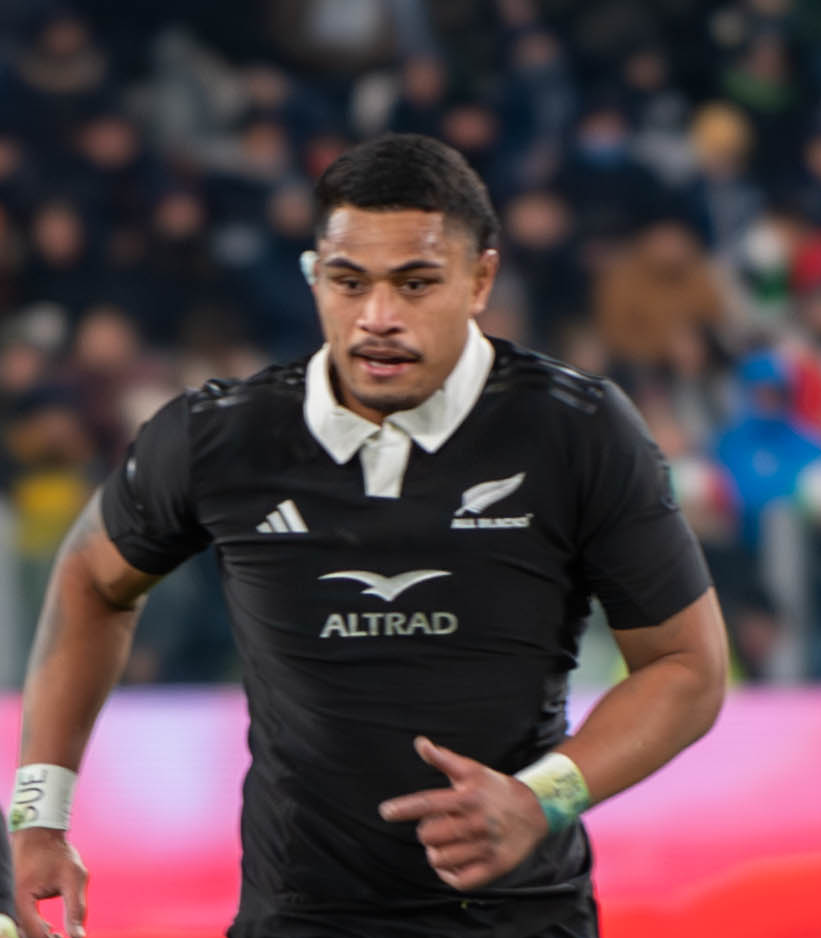
- Vaa'i in 2024
- Full name: Tupou Paea'i Okalani Vaa'i
- Born: 27 January 2000 (age 26) Auckland, New Zealand
- Height: 198 cm (6 ft 6 in)
- Weight: 118 kg (260 lb; 18 st 8 lb)
- School: Wesley College

Rugby union career
- Position(s): Lock, Flanker
- Current team: Taranaki, Chiefs
Senior career
Years	Team	Apps	(Points)
2018–	Taranaki	16	(20)
2020–	Chiefs	88	(90)
- Correct as of 17 October 2026
International career
Years	Team	Apps	(Points)
2019	New Zealand U20	6	(10)
2020–	New Zealand	55	(35)
- Correct as of 21 November 2026

Tupou Paea'i Okalani Vaa'i (born 27 January 2000) is a New Zealand rugby union player who plays as a lock for the All Blacks, the Chiefs in Super Rugby, and Taranaki in the National Provincial Championship.

== Career ==
=== Early career ===
Vaa'i was born in New Zealand to a Tongan family. In his youth career, he played for the Wesley College first XV and was Head Prefect, captaining the team in his last year of school. Vaa'i went on to play for the top representative team in secondary school, and was selected to play in the 2019 World Rugby Under 20 Championships for New Zealand.

Vaa'i debuted for Taranaki as an 18-year-old against Auckland, in 2018. His Chiefs debut came in 2020, when the team was short on locks, having lost Michael Allardice and Laghlan McWhannell to season-ending injuries. Although Vaa'i was not originally contracted to the team at the start of 2020, he was promoted to a starting role following an injury to Naitoa Ah Kuoi. Vaa'i was one of the Chiefs' better performers in their winless Super Rugby Aotearoa season and was named in the North Island team, for New Zealand's 2020 North vs South rugby union match.

In September 2020, Vaa'i was named in Ian Foster's first ever All Blacks squad.

Vaa'i debuted for New Zealand on 11 October 2020, replacing Patrick Tuipulotu off the bench, in the 75th minute, in a 16-16 draw against Australia. Vaa'i became the first player born in the 21st century to represent New Zealand in international rugby.

The following week, with Sam Whitelock ruled out due to concussion symptoms, Vaa'i made his first start for New Zealand, with the All Blacks going on to beat Australia 27-7. Following Tuipulotu's illness ahead of Bledisloe IV a fortnight later, Vaa'i was restored to the matchday 23, accompanying debutants Will Jordan, Asafo Aumua, and Cullen Grace on the bench. He scored his debut test try shortly after coming on, in the 78th minute. Vaa'i ended the 2020 season having played four tests for his country.

=== 2021 ===
Vaa'i became a regular starter for the Chiefs in 2021, finishing the season with a total of 19 Super Rugby caps. He played for the team in the Super Rugby Aotearoa final, which was lost to the Crusaders by 13-24.

He did not feature in the 2021 mid-year tests due to injury, but played three tests for New Zealand during the 2021 Rugby Championship. Vaa'i was used as a replacement off the bench in wins over Argentina and Australia, before starting his first test of the year on 18 September. This was a 36-13 win against Argentina, where Vaa'i played all 80 minutes of the match and scored two tries.

== Statistics ==
Club	Year	Competition	GP	GS	TRY	CON	PEN	DGL	PTS	WL%	Yellow card	Red card
Taranaki	2018	Bunnings NPC (incl. Ranfurly Shield)	3	0	0	0	0	0	0	33.33	0	0
Taranaki	2019	Bunnings NPC (incl. Ranfurly Shield)	6	5	1	0	0	0	5	50.00	0	0
Taranaki	2020†	Bunnings NPC (incl. Ranfurly Shield)	3	3	3	0	0	0	15	66.67	0	0
Taranaki	2021†	Bunnings NPC (incl. Ranfurly Shield)	2	2	0	0	0	0	0	100.00	0	0
Chiefs	2020	Super Rugby Pacific	7	5	0	0	0	0	0	0.00	0	0
Chiefs	2021	Super Rugby Pacific	12	12	2	0	0	0	10	66.67	1	0
Chiefs	2022	Super Rugby Pacific	13	13	2	0	0	0	10	69.23	0	0
Career			46	40	8	0	0	0	40	54.35	1	0

Updated: 12 June 2022 Source: Tupou P O Vaa'i Rugby History

=== List of international tries ===
Try	Date	Venue	Opponent	Result	Competition
1	7 November 2020	Suncorp Stadium, Brisbane, Australia	Australia	22–24 (Lost)	2020 Tri Nations Series
2	18 September 2021	Suncorp Stadium, Brisbane, Australia	Argentina	13–36 (Won)	2021 Rugby Championship
3	18 September 2021	Suncorp Stadium, Brisbane, Australia	Argentina	13–36 (Won)	2021 Rugby Championship
4	5 July 2025	Forsyth Barr Stadium, Dunedin, New Zealand	France	31–27 (Won)	2025 France tour of New Zealand
5	12 July 2025	Wellington Regional Stadium, Wellington, New Zealand	France	43–17 (Won)	2025 France tour of New Zealand
6	11 July 2026	Wellington Regional Stadium, Wellington, New Zealand	Italy	47–17 (Won)	2026 Nations Championship
7	10 October 2026	Eden Park, Auckland, New Zealand	Australia	50–19 (Won)	2026 Bledisloe Cup

Updated: 10 October 2026 Source: Tupou P O Vaa'i Statsguru
