= Tyrel Lomax =

NZ rugby union player (born 1996)

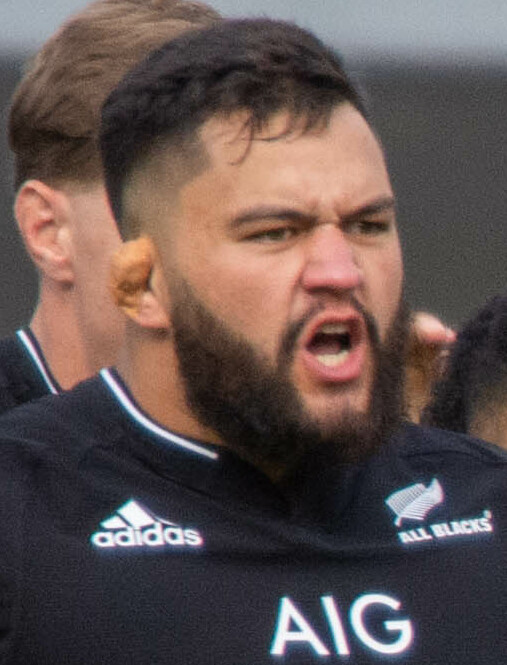
- Full name: Tyrel Shae Lomax
- Born: 16 March 1996 (age 30) Canberra, Australia
- Height: 192 cm (6 ft 4 in)
- Weight: 127 kg (280 lb; 20 st 0 lb)
- School: St Edmund's College; St Patrick's College, Silverstream
- Notable relatives: John Lomax (father); David Lomax (uncle)

Rugby union career
- Position: Prop
- Current team: Tasman, Hurricanes
Senior career
Years	Team	Apps	(Points)
2015	Canberra Vikings	3	(0)
2016	Melbourne Rising	8	(6)
2017	Rebels	13	(0)
2017–	Tasman	33	(10)
2018–2019	Highlanders	31	(15)
2020–	Hurricanes	75	(25)
- Correct as of 13 September 2026
International career
Years	Team	Apps	(Points)
2015–2016	Australia U20	10	(5)
2017–2019, 2022	Māori All Blacks	8	(0)
2018–	New Zealand	55	(0)
2020	South Island	1	(5)
- Correct as of 13 September 2026
Medal record
Men's Rugby union
Representing New Zealand
Rugby World Cup
Silver medal – second place	2023 France	Squad

Tyrel Shae Lomax (born 16 March 1996) is an Australian-born New Zealand rugby union player who plays as a prop for the Hurricanes in Super Rugby and Tasman in the Bunnings NPC. He is the son of former New Zealand (Kiwis) rugby league prop, John Lomax.

== Career ==
Lomax started his rugby career in Australia and made the Australia national under-20 rugby union team. He signed a two-year contract with the Melbourne Rebels. Lomax made his debut for the side against the Blues, coming off the bench in a 58–16 loss for the Rebels.

Lomax moved back to New Zealand after spending time there during his childhood and joined Bunnings NPC side Tasman during the 2017 Mitre 10 Cup, making his debut against Otago at Forsyth Barr Stadium. The Highlanders announced the signing of the former Melbourne Rebels player in September 2017 committing his future to New Zealand rugby. It was announced in May 2019 that Lomax had signed with the Hurricanes for the 2020 Super Rugby season. He was part of the Tasman Mako side that won the Mitre 10 Cup unbeaten in 2019. He was named in the South Island squad for the North vs South rugby union match in 2020 coming off the bench in a 38–35 win for the South.

Lomax debuted for the Māori All Blacks in November 2017 against Canada and played a total of 6 games for the side between 2017 and 2019. Lomax became All Black number 1180 making his debut against Japan in Tokyo in November 2018, but did not play for the side again until 2020 where he made 5 appearances.

After poor performances in Super Rugby, Lomax was dropped from the All Blacks and made his debut for the Māori All Blacks against Ireland in 2022. Lomax was re-called to the national side for the 2022 Rugby Championship and became a regular starter for New Zealand during this time. Lomax was picked for the 2023 Rugby World Cup and started in the Final, an 11–12 loss to South Africa.

In 2024, Lomax was named the Tom French Memorial Māori Player of the Year at the annual New Zealand rugby awards.

In 2026, Lomax formed part of the Hurricanes squad which won the 2026 Super Rugby Pacific season. On 20 June, the Hurricanes defeated the Chiefs 60–5 in the final.

== Personal life ==
Lomax is an Australian of Māori descent (Muaūpoko and Ngāi Tūhoe descent).

Awards
Preceded by Aaron Smith	Tom French Memorial; Māori rugby union player of the year 2024	Succeeded by Portia Woodman-Wickliffe
