= Dalton Papali'i =

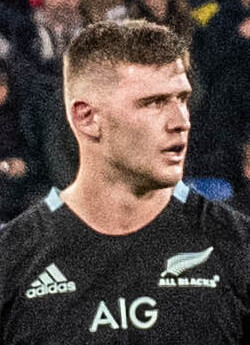
- Papali'i in 2021
- Full name: Dalton Reece Papali'i
- Born: 11 October 1997 (age 29) Auckland, New Zealand
- Height: 193 cm (6 ft 4 in)
- Weight: 113 kg (249 lb; 17 st 11 lb)
- School: St. Kentigern College

Rugby union career
- Position: Flanker
- Current team: Blues, Counties Manukau
Senior career
| Years | Team | Apps | (Points) |
| 2017–2019 | Auckland | 18 | (20) |
| 2018–26 | Blues | 106 | (115) |
| 2020–26 | Counties Manukau | 10 | (15) |
| 2026– | Castres | 0 | (0) |
- Correct as of October 2025
International career
| Years | Team | Apps | (Points) |
| 2016–2017 | New Zealand U20 | 10 | (25) |
| 2018–25 | New Zealand | 37 | (40) |
| 2020 | North Island | 1 | (0) |
- Correct as of October 2025
Medal record
Men's Rugby union
Representing New Zealand
Rugby World Cup
| Silver medal – second place | 2023 France | Squad |

Dalton Reece Papali'i ("Pa-pa-lee-e") is a New Zealand professional rugby union player who plays for Counties Manukau in the Mitre 10 Cup and the Blues in the Super Rugby competition. He also plays international rugby for the New Zealand national rugby union team, making his debut in 2018. His position is flanker. Papali'i previously played for New Zealand Under-20s team.

== Early life and education ==
He played rugby league, his family's sport, in his early years but switched to rugby union as a youngster, when he had the chance to go to Saint Kentigern College. He went on to captain his school's First XV, and won the 2015 Grant Dalton Cup after captaining them to the title by beating Auckland Grammar School in the final.

In 2015, he led the New Zealand national schoolboy rugby union team to victory over Australia.

== Domestic career ==
After school, Papali'i joined the Auckland development programme and also represented his local club Pakuranga. He played for the Blues under-18 squad before going on to captain the Blues under-20s in 2016 and the Blues A team in 2017. He won the Blues Development Player of the Year twice, in 2016 and 2017, the same year in which he made his senior Auckland debut.

In 2018, he made his Super Rugby debut against the Chiefs as a second half replacement. With Blake Gibson out for much of the season, he was given his chance with seven appearances, five of them as a starter, until he also was sidelined later in the season with injury. Dalton carried his rich vein of form into Auckland’s Mitre 10 Cup campaign, leading the competition tackle statistics with 169 and battering defences with his hard running.

In 2020, Papali'i decided to change provinces, leaving Auckland and signing with Counties Manukau. Tai Lavea, the Steeler's coach, had coached Papali'i at Saint Kentigern College and convinced him to make the switch. That same year he established himself as a key component of the Blues back row trio during the Super Rugby Aotearoa competition. In 2024, he was part of the Blues team which won the Super Rugby Pacific title.

In February 2026, Papali’i announced that he would be leaving Auckland Blues and New Zealand rugby at the end of the 2026 season. He signed a deal with French Top 14 team Castres Olympique, for the 2027 season.

== International career ==
Dalton was part of the New Zealand U20 squad that won the 2017 Junior World Championship hosted by Georgia. He earned praise for his performances and was lauded by coach Craig Philpott for his leadership skills.

After a stellar season in Auckland’s Mitre 10 Cup 2018 campaign, he was somewhat surprisingly called into the 32 man All Blacks squad for their northern tour to Japan and Europe, just weeks after his 21st birthday. The call came after injury to 60-test veteran and All Black Captain, Sam Cane. Getting the call meant a lot for the Papali'i family, as his mum broke down in tears upon hearing his name on the list.

Papali'i made his international debut for New Zealand on 3 November 2018, starting in the All Blacks' 69-31 victory over Japan at the Ajinomoto Stadium. In doing so, he became the first Pakuranga player to represent the All Blacks.

His performance against Japan enabled him to earn a spot on the bench for the final test of 2018, against Italy, where he replaced the in-form Ardie Savea 48 minutes into the 66-3 victory over Italy.

2019 saw Dalton become a regular feature in the Blues back row earning 21 caps in total. Another All Blacks call up beckoned during the Rugby Championship, playing against the Springboks in Wellington.

After the Blues' disappointing 2019 Super Rugby season, Papali'i was retained in the All Blacks' squad for the 2019 Rugby Championship, having put in excellent performances across the season. With All Black Vice-Captain, Sam Cane, back from a broken neck, Papali'i only made one appearance in the competition, replacing Highlanders blindside flanker, Shannon Frizell, for the final four minutes of a test against South Africa, which ended in a 16-16 draw.

== Style of play ==
Papali'i can cover both flanker positions, being deployed at blindside or openside, despite being considered by some to be too big to play openside. About his preferred position, he says "Six or seven, I'm not too sure. If I get on that field, I'm going to try and do my best for the team. I prefer to play six, but six, seven or eight I don't mind, I just want to do my bit for the team."

He cites Wallabies captain Michael Hooper as his favourite rugby player, thanks to his "relentless effort off the ball...a deadly player on attack and defence with the desire to win in every aspect of play in rugby and off".

Papali'i is renowned for his tackling skills, regularly averaging around 20 tackles a game on his Auckland days. He also stands out for his strong running, great ball skills and overall work-rate around the park. Papali'i credits Auckland forwards coach and former All Black Filo Tiatia for his constant progress: "I felt like I’ve learnt a lot off Filo, the forwards coach," Papali’i said. "But around my game, I knew the qualities of a seven, tackling and stuff, but they [the coaching staff] were showing me different ways of how to get to rucks and stuff like that."
