= Aaron Smith (rugby union) =

NZ international rugby union player

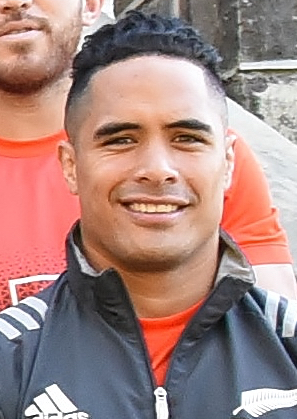
- Smith in 2017
- Full name: Aaron Luke Smith
- Born: 21 November 1988 (age 37) Palmerston North, New Zealand
- Height: 171 cm (5 ft 7 in)
- Weight: 82 kg (181 lb; 12 st 13 lb)
- School: Feilding High School

Rugby union career
- Position: Half-back
- Current team: Toyota Verblitz
Senior career
Years	Team	Apps	(Points)
2008–2021	Manawatu	47	(55)
2011–2023	Highlanders	185	(175)
2024-	Toyota Verblitz	49	(55)
- Correct as of 5 May 2024
International career
Years	Team	Apps	(Points)
2008	New Zealand U20	5	(0)
2010	Māori All Blacks	3	(0)
2012–2023	New Zealand	124	(132)
- Correct as of 28 October 2024
Medal record
Men's Rugby union
Representing New Zealand
Rugby World Cup
Gold medal – first place	2015 England	Squad
Silver medal – second place	2023 France	Squad
Bronze medal – third place	2019 Japan	Squad

Aaron Luke Smith (born 21 November 1988) is a New Zealand professional rugby union player. A scrum half, Smith plays for the Japanese club Toyota Verblitz.

Smith played for the Highlanders in Super Rugby, and for Manawatu in the ITM Cup. He has won 124 caps for New Zealand (the All Blacks) and is their 2nd most-capped back.

Smith played for New Zealand Maori in 2010, and was first selected for the All Blacks in 2012. He was a key member of the 2015 Rugby World Cup winning team. His last test match was the 2023 Rugby World Cup final against South Africa on 28 October 2023.

== Provincial rugby ==
Smith made his debut for Manawatu in the 2008 Air New Zealand Cup at the age of 19, making several substitute appearances for the Turbos. This included the historic 25–24 win over Canterbury in Round 1 and the 38–38 draw with Waikato in Round 3.

For the 2009 Air New Zealand Cup, Smith established himself as the first-choice half-back for Manawatu, starting all 13 games over the course of the season and scoring his first representative try. He continued as the starter in the 2010 ITM Cup, and established himself as one of the top half-backs in the competition and earning a Super Rugby contract.

In the 2011 ITM Cup, Smith continued to improve and had a successful season, scoring five tries helping the improved Manawatu squad which reached the Championship final.

== Super Rugby ==
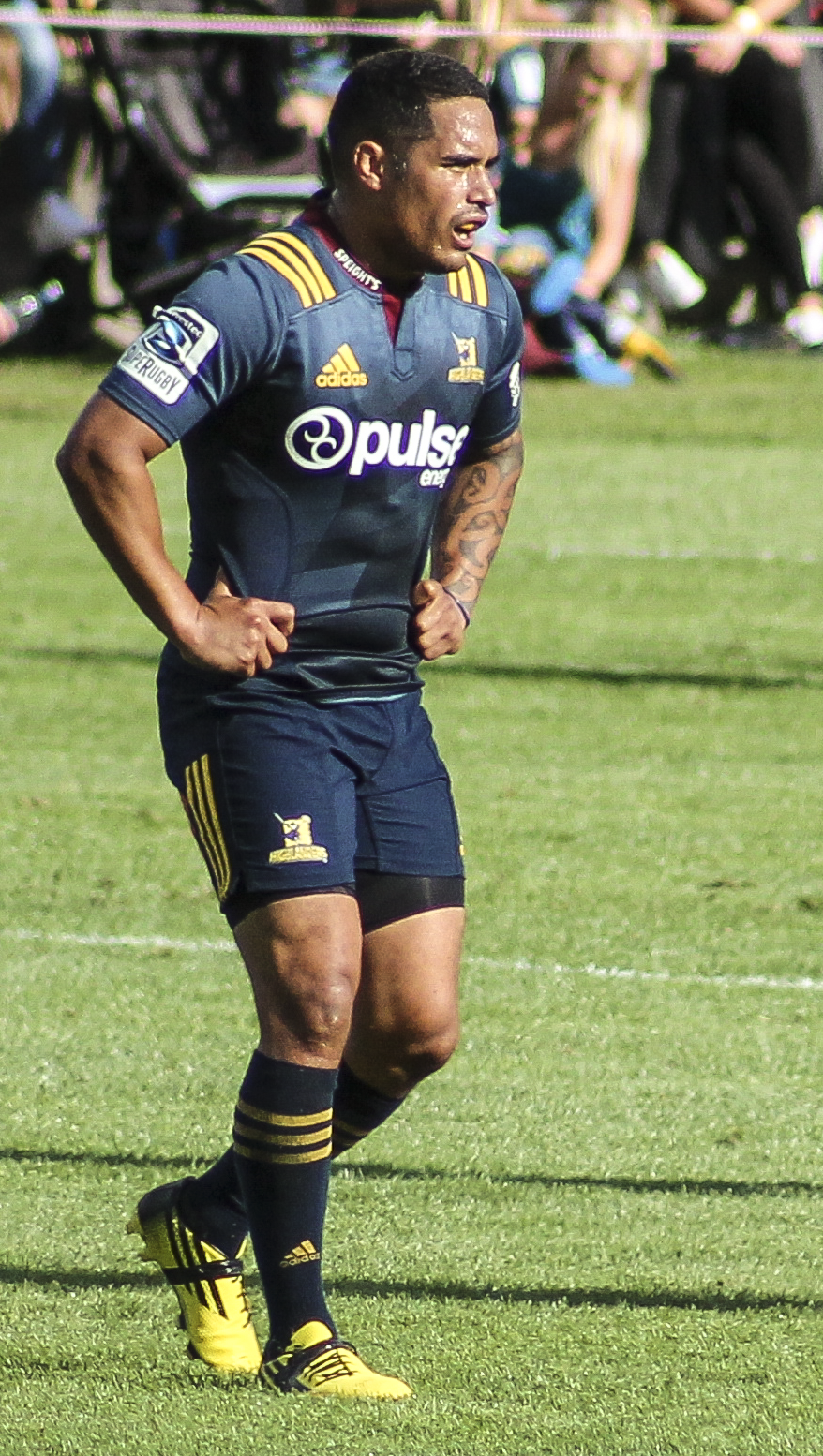
Smith playing for the Highlanders

Smith was included in the Blues wider training group for the 2010 Super 14 season, but did not see any game action for the Auckland-based side.

For the 2011 Super Rugby season, Smith signed for the Highlanders, coached by Jamie Joseph, who had previously coached Smith with New Zealand Māori. Smith had a successful debut season, beating out Sean Romans for the job as backup to starting half-back (and All Black) Jimmy Cowan, and made 12 appearances including 3 starts.

== International career ==
On the back of his strong performances for Manawatu, Smith, of Ngāti Kahungunu descent, was selected to New Zealand Māori for their 2010 Centenary Series. He came on as a substitute against the New Zealand Barbarians after Chris Smylie suffered a fractured cheekbone, and started in the squad's historic victories over Ireland and England.

On the back of a successful Highlanders season, Smith made his All Blacks debut on 9 June 2012, against Ireland. By the time of the 2013 season, Smith had become the first choice halfback for the national team.

Smith has been selected for every New Zealand squad since 2013, including the 2015 Rugby World Cup squad where he started in all the knockout games. Smith became the leader of the All Blacks' haka in 2016, following the retirement of Keven Mealamu and Liam Messam's decision to swap to New Zealand's rugby 7s squad, first leading the Haka against Wales at Eden Park.

Smith played his 50th international test match in the final test against Wales, during the 2016 tour, alongside lock Brodie Retallick, with whom he debuted. Smith lost his place as the All Blacks' Haka leader later in the season due to off-field controversy, where he was caught with a woman in an airport bathroom as well as strong competition for a starting place, from TJ Perenara. Smith was retained as a regular starter into the 2017 season, when he started in all three tests against the touring British & Irish Lions.

Smith became the most-capped scrum-half in New Zealand's history in the 2018 season, breaking Justin Marshall's long-standing record on 17 November 2018. Despite the ongoing competition for his starting place through TJ Perenara, Smith was chosen to start against Ireland. Smith, during his record-breaking performance, failed to perform well, with the All Blacks losing 9-16. On 5 September 2020, Smith represented the North Island in the 2020 North vs South rugby union match. In March 2021, it was announced by New Zealand Rugby that Smith had signed a new contract with the All Blacks, the Highlanders and Manawatu that will see him stay in New Zealand until 2023.

On 7 August 2021, in a game at Eden Park, Auckland against the Wallabies Smith became the tenth All Black to register 100 tests and the first of Maori descent.

In 2023, Smith announced he had signed to play at Japanese club Toyota Verblitz after his international retirement.

== Honours ==
New Zealand

- Rugby World Cup / Webb Ellis Cup
  - Winners: 2015
  - Third-place: 2019
  - Runner up: 2023
- The Rugby Championship: 2012, 2013, 2014, 2016, 2017, 2018
- Bledisloe Cup: 2012, 2013, 2014, 2015, 2016, 2017, 2018, 2019, 2020, 2021, 2022
- Dave Gallaher Trophy: 2013 (2), 2016, 2017, 2018
- Freedom Cup: 2012, 2013, 2014, 2015, 2016, 2017, 2018, 2019
- Hillary Shield: 2013, 2014 (2), 2018
- British & Irish Lions series: 2017 (drawn series – shared title)

Highlanders

- Super Rugby: 2015

Awards
Preceded by Liam Messam	Tom French Memorial; Māori rugby union player of the year 2014; 2023	Succeeded by Nehe Milner-Skudder
Preceded by Ruahei Demant	Tom French Memorial; Māori rugby union player of the year 2014; 2023	Succeeded by Tyrel Lomax
