= Sam Moli =

Tonga international rugby union player

- Full name: Samiuela Moli
- Born: 24 December 1998 (age 27) Gisborne, New Zealand
- Height: 1.85 m (6 ft 1 in)
- Weight: 114 kg (251 lb; 17 st 13 lb)
- School: Marlborough Boys' College
- Notable relative(s): Atu Moli (brother); Monu Moli (brother)

Rugby union career
- Position: Hooker
- Current team: Leicester Tigers
Senior career
Years	Team	Apps	(Points)
2017–2025	Tasman	26	(15)
2022–2026	Moana Pasifika	48	(25)
2026–	Leicester Tigers	9	(20)
- Correct as of 16 November 2026
International career
Years	Team	Apps	(Points)
2021–	Tonga	25	(35)
- Correct as of 18 April 2026

Samiuela Moli (born 24 December 1998) is a rugby union player for Leicester Tigers in England's Premiership Rugby. His position is Hooker. Born in New Zealand, he represents Tonga at international level after qualifying on ancestry grounds.

== Club career ==
=== Tasman ===
Moli made his debut for Tasman in Round 9 of the 2017 Mitre 10 Cup against Counties Manukau. In September 2020 Moli was named in the Tasman Mako squad for the 2020 Mitre 10 Cup. The Mako went on to win their second premiership title in a row, with Moli coming off the bench in a 12-13 victory against Auckland in the final. Moli made only a few appearances during the 2021 Bunnings NPC as Tasman made the final before losing 23–20 to Waikato.

=== Moana Pasifika ===
Moli signed with Moana Pasifika for the 2022 Super Rugby Pacific season. He made his debut off the bench in Round 3 against the Crusaders.

=== Leicester Tigers ===
In August 2026 Leicester Tigers announced they had signed Moli after his previous club Moana Pasifika disbanded following financial issues.

== International career ==
=== Tonga ===
Moli was named in the Tonga national rugby union team squad to play New Zealand and Samoa in July 2021. He made his debut against the All Blacks.
