= Matt Todd =

NZ international rugby union player

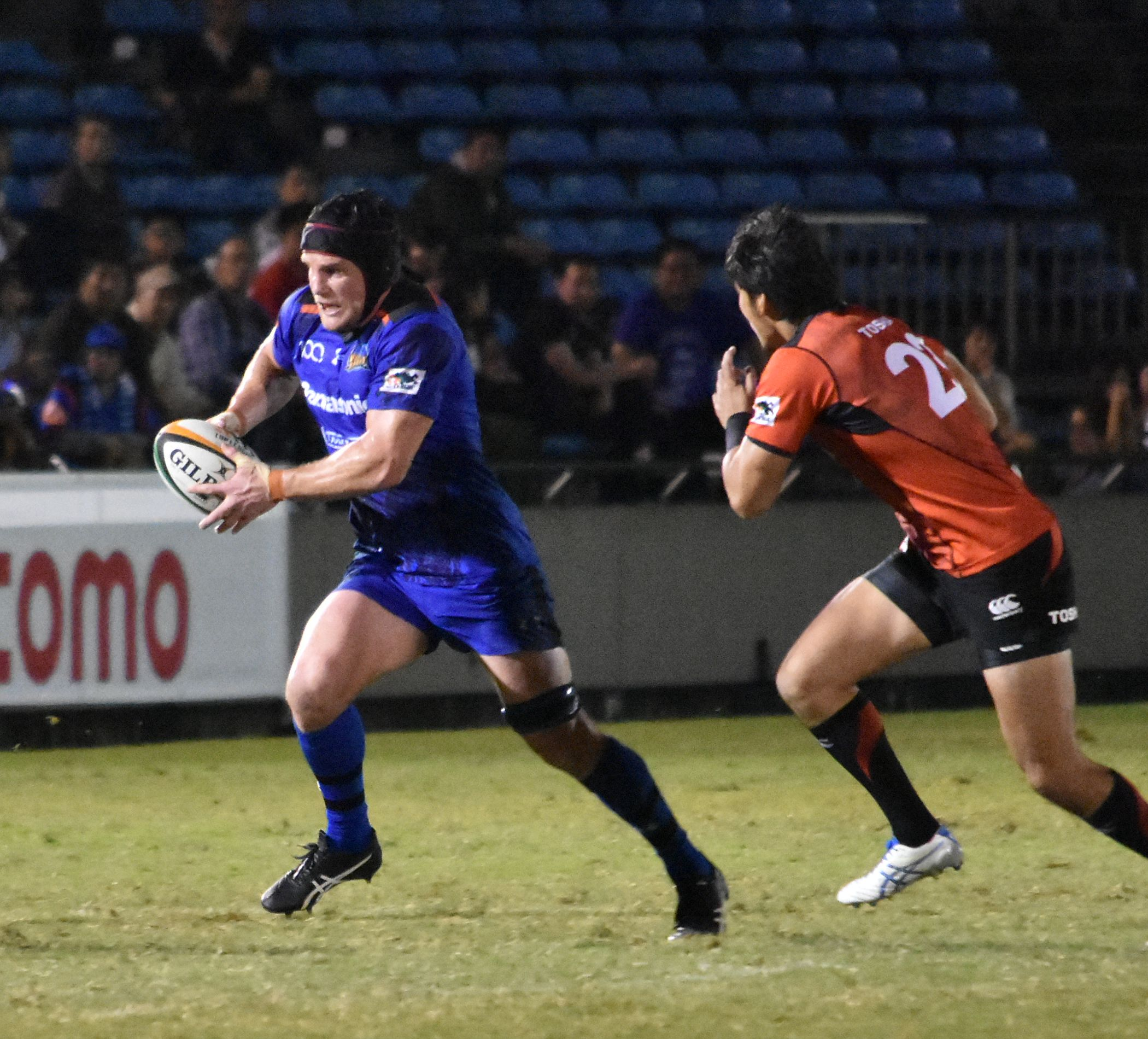
- Todd in 2018
- Full name: Matthew Brendon Todd
- Born: 24 March 1988 (age 38) Christchurch, New Zealand
- Height: 185 cm (6 ft 1 in)
- Weight: 105 kg (231 lb; 16 st 7 lb)
- School: Kaiapoi High School; Christchurch Boys' High School

Rugby union career
- Position: Openside Flanker
- Current team: Toshiba Brave Lupus
Senior career
Years	Team	Apps	(Points)
2009–2017	Canterbury	72	(80)
2011–2019	Crusaders	140	(140)
2018	Panasonic Wild Knights	10	(20)
2019–2023	Toshiba Brave Lupus	31	(55)
- Correct as of 25 April 2023
International career
Years	Team	Apps	(Points)
2013–2019	New Zealand	25	(15)
2014	New Zealand Barbarians	2	(0)
2014	Barbarian F.C.	2	(0)
- Correct as of 1 November 2019
Coaching career
- Years: Team
- 2022–2023: Canterbury (Assistant)
- 2024–: Crusaders (Assistant)
- Correct as of 6 June 2023

Matthew Brendon Todd (born 24 March 1988) is a New Zealand rugby union coach and former player. He is currently an assistant coach for the Crusaders.

Todd played as a flanker for 25 tests for New Zealand internationally, from his debut in 2013, until his last test, during the 2019 Rugby World Cup. He scored three tries for New Zealand and also became the first overseas-based player to represent the All Blacks, in 2018, when he first signed for Panasonic. From 2009 to 2017, he played more than 150 games for the Crusaders in Super Rugby.

== Early life ==
Todd's started playing rugby at the Kaiapoi Rugby Football Union and went on to play for the Kaiapoi High School first XV. He then attended Christchurch Boys’ High School. While at Christchurch Boys' High School, Todd appeared alongside future All Black team-mates, Colin Slade and Owen Franks, as well as former Crusader Nasi Manu and current Crusader Tim Bateman.

== Playing career ==
=== Early career ===
In 2009, Todd made his Air New Zealand Cup debut representing Canterbury as a replacement against Waikato at AMI Stadium. He made his first start against Taranaki a week later in the second Shield challenge of the season.

In the 2010 NPC season, with teammate Richie McCaw being busy with the All Blacks, he had a chance to start in all of Canterbury's games. His versatility in being able to play blindside and openside flanker has helped Canterbury to win the Ranfurly Shield.

Following an early-season injury to McCaw, Todd was selected to play for the Crusaders 2011 season. Todd had previously been in the Crusaders' wider training group in 2010. Todd's presence in the Crusaders saw Richie McCaw switch jerseys, from 7 to 6, with Head Coach Todd Blackadder choosing to field two openside flankers, in order to make Todd a regular starter for the team.

=== 2013-2017 ===
In 2013, Todd played outstandingly in the absence of Richie McCaw, who was on sabbatical. Todd was subsequently selected for the All Blacks by Head Coach Steve Hansen. Todd made his international debut for them during a 24–9 victory over France on 22 June 2013, replacing fellow rookie Sam Cane off the bench in the 72nd minute. Todd was also used off the bench against South Africa that year.

After missing international rugby in 2014, Todd played against Samoa in Apia, in 2015, replacing veteran Jerome Kaino the bench for a one-off test match, which the All Blacks won, 25–16.

After missing the 2015 Rugby World Cup, Todd was re-selected for New Zealand in the 2016 Rugby Championship following a leg injury to Sam Cane. Todd earned the first two starts of his international career in the series, against South Africa and Australia, where New Zealand retained the Bledisloe Cup. He was notably named Man of the Match in the final Bledisloe Cup Test, before being replaced by Ardie Savea in the 65th minute, as the All Blacks beat Australia 37–10. Todd's outstanding performance against Australia saw him taken on the 2016 end-of-year tour, where he played in a further two tests.

Todd's standout 2016 season saw him named as one of two vice-captains for the Crusaders in 2017 alongside Ryan Crotty, with lock Sam Whitelock named as captain.

Todd played the full 80 minutes against the touring British and Irish Lions side for the Crusaders on 10 June. The Crusaders lost 3–12. Despite performing well in his Super Rugby campaign which included a start in the 25-17 Grand Final win over the Lions, Todd was not selected for the All Blacks' Lions series squad or the initial squad for the 2017 Rugby Championship.

After Jerome Kaino paused his training with the All Blacks for personal reasons and went to represent Auckland in the Mitre 10 Cup, Todd was re-selected and started against Argentina in a scrappy 36–10 win where he received the first yellow card of his test career and was replaced by Ardie Savea in the 65th minute. Todd made four more appearances for the All Blacks in 2017, including three on the bench as a replacement for Sam Cane on the end-of-year tour.

=== 2018 ===
Todd captained the Crusaders numerous times during the 2018 Super Rugby season, with Ryan Crotty and Sam Whitelock suffering multiple concussions each through the season. Todd was later chosen as Crusaders' Player of the Season by his team-mates as the team beat the Lions, in the Super Rugby final, for the second year in a row. The Crusaders won against the Lions by 37-18 and claimed their ninth Super Rugby title.

Although Todd was performing very well in comparison to Ardie Savea, who was struggling with injury, during Super Rugby, Savea was again chosen over Todd for the All Blacks' mid-year test series, which was against France. Todd was again called into the All Blacks, however, with Sam Cane struggling in regards to discipline, while Liam Squire and Vaea Fifita were struggling with injuries. Todd was named on the bench for the third test of the Steinlager series, on 23 June 2018. Todd replaced the injured Savea only 17 minutes into the test, scoring his first international try only minutes later. Todd starred against France as the All Blacks won 49–14.

After the conclusion of Super Rugby, Todd signed a high-profile one-season deal with Japan-based club, the Panasonic Wild Knights. Todd missed the 2018 Rugby Championship with his commitments to the Wild Knights, but was called in for the injured Sam Cane for 2018 the end-of-year tour. Todd subsequently became the first overseas-based All Black upon his re-selection.

Todd played three tests off the bench during the end-of-year tour, replacing Ardie Savea in all of them. Todd unfortunately did not manage to make much of an impact towards New Zealand's 9–16 loss to Ireland, only playing for four minutes during the test.

=== 2019 ===
Todd returned to the Crusaders for the 2019 Super Rugby season, his final season in New Zealand, which saw him Captain the team occasionally throughout the season. The Crusaders went on to win the competition for the third year in a row, sending Todd off on a high.

With Liam Squire opting out of consideration for All Black selection, Todd went on to start against South Africa in the 2019 Rugby Championship, also appearing as a substitute against Australia in the first Bledisloe Cup test of the year, which was a 26–47 loss.

All Blacks Head Coach, Steve Hansen named Todd in New Zealand's 31-man squad for the 2019 Rugby World Cup on 28 August 2019. Having narrowly missed selection in 2015, this was to be Todd's first World Cup.

Todd played in two tests during the World Cup's pool stages, including a start in a 63–0 victory over Canada. Todd was later named as a replacement for the quarter-final, against Ireland, scoring a try in the 46–14 victory, although he did receive a yellow card with three minutes left. Although Todd was ruled out of the semi-final loss to England through injury, he played his last test for New Zealand on 1 November 2019, replacing Shannon Frizell, with 20 minutes left of the 40–17 win against Wales, during the World Cup's Bronze Final. Todd was one of five players to finish his international career for New Zealand that day, with Sonny Bill Williams, Ben Smith and Todd's Crusaders teammates, Ryan Crotty and Captain Kieran Read, all retiring that day, alongside Todd.

=== 2020-Present ===
Following the 2019 Rugby World Cup, Todd joined the Toshiba Brave Lupus under head coach Todd Blackadder, his former Crusaders coach.

In 2024, a new house being built for Todd in Queenstown was caught up in the collapse of building firm Build 7 South Island. The firm was placed into liquidation with debts of NZ$1,500,000 before the building was completed. Todd may have lost as much as NZ$200,000. Speaking about the insolvent company, Todd said, "I feel terrible for the contractors who have worked so long on this project and have not been paid."

== Coaching career ==
Todd joined the coaching staff for the Canterbury football team for the 2022 National Provincial Championship. He took the role of breakdown coach, working under the team's head coach Marty Bourke.

In 2023, it was announced that Todd would be joining the Crusaders coaching staff under new head coach Rob Penney. His duties will begin during the 2024 Super Rugby season.

== Honours ==
New Zealand

- Rugby World Cup / Webb Ellis Cup
  - Third-place: 2019
