= Kyren Taumoefolau =

Tongan rugby union player (born 2003)

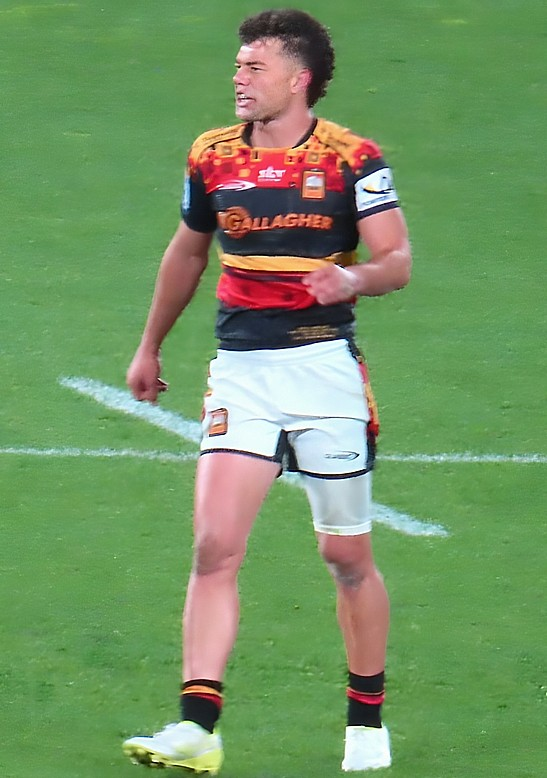
- Taumoefolau with the Chiefs in the 2026 Super Rugby final
- Full name: Kyren Taumoefolau
- Born: 8 May 2003 (age 23) Blenheim, Marlborough, New Zealand
- Height: 191 cm (6 ft 3 in)
- Weight: 95 kg (209 lb; 14 st 13 lb)
- School: Marlborough Boys' College

Rugby union career
- Position(s): Fullback, Wing
- Current team: Chiefs, Tasman
Senior career
Years	Team	Apps	(Points)
2023–2025	Moana Pasifika	21	(60)
2024–	Tasman	32	(135)
2026–	Chiefs	13	(50)
- Correct as of 9 October 2026
International career
Years	Team	Apps	(Points)
2023	Tonga	6	(20)
- Correct as of 9 October 2026
National sevens team
Years	Team		Comps
2022	Tonga		3

Kyren Taumoefolau (born 8 May 2003) is a New Zealand born Tongan rugby union player who plays fullback and wing for the Chiefs in Super Rugby Pacific and Tasman in the Bunnings NPC, as well as the Tongan national team.

== Early life ==
Taumoefolau was born in Blenheim, in the New Zealand region of Marlborough in 2003. He attended Marlborough Boys' College, and was co-captain of the First XV, where he played as a first five. He is of Tongan ancestry.

== Career ==
=== Moana Pasifika ===
He played for local Picton club Waitohi, before joining Moana Pasifika. His debut for Moana Pasifika came in the second round coming off the bench in a win over the Fijian Drua. He scored a try in his first start for the side, crossing the line in the 47th minute of a 14–22 win over the Western Force. He again scored the following week in a 60–21 loss against the ACT Brumbies.

Taumoefolau exploded in 2025, scoring 9 tries as Moana Pasifika completed their best season since their establishment in 2022. In May, rumours began to swirl about a potential move to rival Super Rugby Pacific team, the Chiefs. In June, Moana Pasifika confirmed via social media that Taumoefolau was leaving the team. He signed a two year deal with the Chiefs on the 4th of August.

=== Chiefs ===
In August 2025, it was announced that Taumoefolau had signed for the Hamilton based Chiefs on a two year deal, starting in 2026. In June 2026, Taumoefolau, who had scored in his previous four appearances for the Chiefs, including a back-to-back double, made his first Super Rugby grand final appearance. The Chiefs lost to the Hurricanes 60–5 in Wellington.

=== Tasman ===
Taumoefolau made his debut for Tasman coming off the bench on the 17th of August 2024 in a 22-7 win over Canterbury at Trafalgar Park.

He started the 2026 NPC season with a hat-trick against North Harbour in a 31-29 win on the 31st of July. He later followed this up with an NPC record equalling 5 tries against Counties Manukau on the 16th of August 2026, first set by Auckland's Terry Wright against Manawatū in 1984, with only another 4 players also achieving the same. In doing so he also passed the previous Tasman record of 4 tries set by Macca Springer and Peter Playford. In Round 10 he broke the NPC season try scoring record of 15 also set by Terry Wright in 1984, Taumoefolau scoring his 16th to pass him while scoring 4 tries in Tasman's 33–50 win over Waikato. Taumoefolau finished the season with 19 tries.

== International career ==
Being born in New Zealand, Taumoefolau is eligible to represent the All Blacks and Tonga.

Before Taumoefolau made his test debut, he played for the Tongan National Sevens team as a teenager in the 2023 World Sevens Series in Hamilton.

He made his senior international Test debut coming off the bench against Australia A in July 2023. He scored a try in the 2023 Pacific Nations Cup against Fiji. He was later named in the Tonga squad for the 2023 Rugby World Cup, featuring once against Romania where he again scored.

Having not played for Tonga since 2023, Taumoefolau would be eligible to represent New Zealand in October 2026, ahead of New Zealand's Bledisloe Cup series against Australia.
