= Atu Moli =

NZ international rugby union player

- Full name: Atunaisa Moli
- Born: 12 June 1995 (age 31) Gisborne, New Zealand
- Height: 189 cm (6 ft 2 in)
- Weight: 127 kg (280 lb; 20 st 0 lb)
- School: Marlborough Boys' College
- University: University of Waikato
- Notable relative(s): Monu Moli (brother), Sam Moli (brother)

Rugby union career
- Position: Prop
- Current team: Counties Manukau, Toshiba Brave Lupus
Senior career
Years	Team	Apps	(Points)
2015–2018	Waikato	18	(15)
2016–2023	Chiefs	55	(15)
2019–2023	Tasman	15	(0)
2024–2025	Western Force	10	(0)
2026	Moana Pasifika	7	(0)
2026–	Counties Manukau	6	(5)
2026–	Toshiba Brave Lupus		
- Correct as of 24 September 2026
International career
Years	Team	Apps	(Points)
2014–2015	New Zealand U20	12	(0)
2017	Barbarian F.C.	1	(0)
2017–2019	New Zealand	4	(0)
2026–	Tonga	3	(0)
- Correct as of 24 September 2026

Atunaisa Moli (born 12 June 1995) is a New Zealand rugby union player who currently plays as a Prop. He has represented the New Zealand national rugby union team the All Blacks.

Starting his career as a Tighthead Prop, Moli converted to Loosehead Prop during his professional career. Moli made his debut for New Zealand in 2017, earning a recall in 2019 after a spell of injury and made their team for the 2019 Rugby World Cup.

== Early career ==
Moli was born in the North Island town of Gisborne, but attended Marlborough Boys' College in the South Island town of Blenheim. He is of Tongan descent. While attending college, he represented Marlborough at under 16 and Tasman at under 18 level before moving to Waikato after graduation and representing them at under 19 level.

== Senior career ==
Moli debuted for Waikato during the 2015 ITM Cup in a match against Tasman on 14 August after starring as a school boy. Hindered by a foot injury, he only played 6 games during his first season of provincial level rugby, 2 of which were from the start. 2016 again saw him make 6 appearances, this time however, they were all from the start as he began to make the number 1 jersey his own. In 2019 Moli made his debut for Tasman against Manawatu at Lansdowne Park in Blenheim. Moli missed the 2020 Mitre 10 Cup with injury as the Mako went on to win their second premiership title in a row. He played for the Mako during the 2021 Bunnings NPC but again suffered an injury before the end of the season.

== Super Rugby ==
After just 6 games at provincial level, Moli made the Chiefs Super Rugby squad for the 2016 Super Rugby season, debuting in a match against the Southern Kings in Port Elizabeth. A season ending injury to Nepo Laulala meant that he received more game time during his debut season than he might have otherwise expected, playing 10 times and scoring 1 try. He was retained by the side for the 2017 Super Rugby season.

Moli missed the whole 2018 Super Rugby season due to a leg injury. He forced his way back into the first choice team during the 2019 Super Rugby season, establishing himself as one of the Chiefs best performers during the season.

After over a year injured Moli returned to the Chiefs side in Round 2 of the Super Rugby Trans-Tasman competition, coming off the bench in a 40–19 win for the side - however that was the only match he played during the 2021 Super Rugby season.

== International ==
Moli represented New Zealand Schools in 2013 and was a member of the New Zealand Under 20 teams which competed in the 2014 and 2015 World Rugby Under 20 Championships. He appeared 5 times as New Zealand finished third in 2014 and made another 5 appearances, this time as captain as the Kiwis lifted the title in 2015 with a 21–16 victory over England in the final.

Moli was selected as a non playing "Apprentice" in the All Blacks squad for the 2017 Rugby Championship. Moli was only the third New Zealander to be selected for the All Blacks as an apprentice, following Ardie Savea who was an apprentice in 2013 and Jordie Barrett who held the title in 2016. After injuries to Joe Moody and Owen Franks, the All Blacks coaches had to seek more depth for the end of year tour. This meant that after starting in a 31–22 loss against the All Blacks for the Barbarians coached by Robbie Deans on 4 November, Moli joined the All Blacks squad again, making his debut for New Zealand against a French side 10 days later, replacing Tim Perry with 23 minutes left. Moli was one of six players to make their All Blacks debut in the 28–23 win.

In 2019, Moli was recalled into the All Blacks squad, named to play Argentina at Jose Amalfitani Stadium (Estadio Velez Sarsfield) in Buenos Aires on Saturday 20 July as part of The Rugby Championship. He made his test debut in the 60th minute of the game, replacing Ofa Tu'ungafasi. With experienced props, Karl Tu'inukuafe and Owen Franks, axed from the team, Moli also earned an appearance off the bench against Australia during a 26–47 loss.

In August 2019, Moli was named in the All Blacks squad for the 2019 Rugby World Cup. Moli earned his first start for the All Blacks in the sides 63–0 win over Canada, lasting the whole 80 minutes of the test. Moli played one more test during the competition, coming off the bench against Wales in the Bronze Final, with New Zealand winning 40–17 to claim third place.
