= Kershawl Sykes-Martin =

New Zealand rugby union player

- Born: 26 April 1999 (age 27) Ruatoria, New Zealand
- Height: 187 cm (6 ft 2 in)
- Weight: 111 kg (245 lb; 17 st 7 lb)
- School: Saint Kentigern College

Rugby union career
- Position: Prop
- Current team: Tasman, Crusaders
Senior career
Years	Team	Apps	(Points)
2020–	Tasman	27	(0)
- Correct as of 22 August 2026
Super Rugby
Years	Team	Apps	(Points)
2023–	Crusaders	17	(0)
- Correct as of 22 August 2026
International career
Years	Team	Apps	(Points)
2025–	Māori All Blacks	2	(0)
- Correct as of 22 August 2026

Kershawl J. Sykes-Martin (born 26 April 1999) is a New Zealand rugby union player who plays for Tasman in the Bunnings NPC and the Crusaders in Super Rugby. His position is prop.

== Career ==
Sykes-Martin made his debut for Tasman in Round 1 of the 2020 Mitre 10 Cup against Counties Manukau at Pukekohe Stadium, coming off the bench in a 24-41 win for the Mako. He played another 2 matches for the side in 2020 as they went on to win their second premiership title in a row. Sykes-Martin was ruled out of the 2021 Bunnings NPC with injury. The Mako went on to make the final before losing 23–20 to Waikato. Sykes-Martin was called into the Crusaders squad during the 2023 Super Rugby Pacific season and made his debut for the side in Round 3 against the Drua.
