= Anton Oliver =

NZ international rugby union player

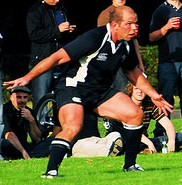
- Playing for Oxford
- Born: Anton David Oliver; 9 September 1975 (age 51) Invercargill, New Zealand
- Height: 1.84 m (6 ft 1/2 in)
- Weight: 111 kg (17.5 st)
- School: Marlborough Boys' College
- University: University of Otago; Worcester College, Oxford
- Notable relative: Frank Oliver

Rugby union career
- Position: Hooker
Provincial / State sides
Years	Team	Apps	(Points)
1994–2007	Otago	84	(95)
1993	Marlborough	1	(0)
Super Rugby
Years	Team	Apps	(Points)
1996–2007	Highlanders	127	(45)
International career
Years	Team	Apps	(Points)
1996–2007	New Zealand	59	(15)

Anton David Oliver (born 9 September 1975) is a retired New Zealand rugby union player. Previously, he played as a hooker for Marlborough (one of the predecessors to today's Tasman side) and Otago in the National Provincial Championship and Air New Zealand Cup, and spent twelve seasons with the Highlanders in Super Rugby. He earned 59 caps for his country and for a period was All Blacks captain.

Anton's father Frank Oliver was also an All Blacks captain, making them the first and only father-son All Black captains in history.

His brother, James Oliver, played as a flanker and number 8 for Horowhenua-Kapiti (11 games), Manawatu (43 games) and captained the New Zealand Universities team in 2013.

== Early life ==
Oliver was born 9 September 1975 in Invercargill and spent the early years of his life in several small towns in the deep south of NZ. When he was seven he moved to Blenheim where he went on to be Head Boy of Marlborough Boys' College in 1993. During this time, Anton made all of the possible New Zealand age group rugby teams – Under17, Under19, Under21, and the NZ Secondary Schools Team – captaining them all.

He initially played at number 8 for the NZ under 17s. The following year he changed positions to hooker and made his provincial debut for Marlborough against Nelson Bays in when he was sixteen. He also represented NZ Secondary schools and 19s in 1993 – captaining both teams. In 1994, he represented NZ Under 19s (again the captain) and NZ Under 21s, and represented the Under 21s for the next two years – captaining the team in his last year.

Anton then went to Dunedin in 1994 to study at the University of Otago and ended up spending his next 14 years there. He made his debut for the Otago first team in 1994 and played for Otago for 13 years. Oliver also played for the Highlanders rugby team and held the record for the most games for the Highlanders at 127. Oliver captained both teams. He also completed degrees in commerce (finance) and physical education while being a full professional rugby player.

== All Blacks ==
Oliver first made the All Blacks as a reserve for a Bledisloe cup test match in 1995 aged 19. He was drafted directly from the NZ U21s team. He played his first game for the All Blacks the following year against Eastern Province in Port Elizabeth, South Africa. Remarkably, almost twenty years to the day after his father played his first game for the All Blacks on the same ground against the same opposition. Oliver played his first test match against Fiji 1997.

Oliver created the first father and son captain combination for the All Blacks when he was appointed as All Blacks captain in 2001. Father Frank Oliver captained the All Blacks in 1978 and was one of the hardmen of New Zealand rugby.

He then ruptured his Achilles tendon at the end of the Super 12 season in 2002, which forced him to miss the entire All Black season.

Oliver then made the All Blacks the following year, Reuben Thorne was now the captain. Oliver was dropped for the World Cup in Australia and was a surprise recall to the team in 2004 for the end of the year tour reflecting a desire by the coaching staff for the All Blacks to regain the forward power that so characterised the All Black team of 1995–97. From then until his retirement from international rugby after the 2007 Rugby World Cup, he was either the first choice hooker for the All Blacks or contending for first choice with Keven Mealamu.

In total he played 298 first class games.[2] and was in a member of the All Blacks for thirteen years – an astonishingly long time for the team. Oliver was labelled as the "thinking man's rugby player" and in his book autobiography "Anton Oliver, Inside" (2005) he wrote about many issues that face the modern day All Blacks that had not been discussed before. 'Inside' was widely regarded as erudite, insightful and not the norm for a rugby book.

== After All Blacks ==
In May 2007, Anton Oliver signed a two-year contract to play with French rugby club Toulon after the completion of the Rugby World Cup. He joined up with legends of the world rugby game, including Springbok Victor Matfield, former Wallaby Captain George Gregan, former All Black Andrew Mehrtens and former All Black captain Tana Umaga. After 14 years in Otago playing rugby Oliver decided that it was time for a change. Turning down numerous offers to play rugby in the United Kingdom Oliver chose to play rugby in France, which he felt would be more suited to his love of culture.

Oliver helped Toulon win the Pro D2 title and earn automatic promotion to the following season's Top 14. He then decided to leave Toulon after only one year and announced his retirement from professional rugby, heading to the University of Oxford to study for a postgraduate degree.

== Retirement ==
At the University of Oxford, Oliver read for an MSc in Biodiversity, Conservation and Management at Worcester College. His dissertation involved him travelling to the Ringgolds Islands, an outlying archipelago of Fiji, for a month of research on the relationship between poverty and conservation. He played a major role in the 2008 Varsity Match against Cambridge, the first victory for Oxford in four years.[4][5]

Oliver then spent the next three years living and working in London. He currently works for asset managers M&G in London in a corporate governance position for M&G's global equities team. During this time he also went to the University of Cambridge where he read for an Executive MBA and is a member of Pembroke College. Oliver's dissertation focused on leadership in business, specifically sense making and sense giving: how leaders make sense of an uncertain, chaotic economic environment and then how leaders communicate and 'make sense' of this information to different stake holders.

== Life outside rugby ==
Oliver is known as a modern NZ renaissance man because of his rare interest and involvement in sport, academia, the arts, and various environmental, social and political issues. He is a well known supporter of the arts and has friends with several prominent NZ poets, writers and painters. He posed nude for a Simon Richardson realist painting that challenged cultural and sporting stereotypes, although he had not intended for it to become public knowledge that he was the artist's model.

In 2013 Oliver toured NZ with the NZ Symphony Orchestra narrating Prokofiev's 'Peter and the Wolf'. In tandem with the tour Oliver went to several schools advocating to students the role of the arts in their lives – specifically the role the arts can have in finding one's authentic self and as a medium for a greater emotional engagement with oneself.

He was also a member of Save Central and an outspoken critic against Meridian Energy's Project Hayes, a planned new 630MW windfarm. Save Central won the last hearing in the High court and Project Hayes has not been granted consent and Oliver was a publicly – as a current All Black at the time, this was a very rare and controversial position. More recently Oliver became a water conservation spokesperson for Fish and Game, bring awareness to river degradation and overuse issues in a NZ context. He has written on environmental issues for the literary journal Landfall.

Oliver was Marlborough Boys' College's sportsman of the decade, has been inducted into the University of Otago's Hall of Fame. He is also one of KEA's World Class New Zealanders.

Oliver has written an autobiography called 'Inside' and presented three television non-fiction documentaries. He is patron and ambassador for several environmental and child health charities, including patron to the Yellow-eyed Penguin Trust and patron to Generation Zero, a youth-led organisation focused on minimising climate change. He is an Ambassador for Cure Kids, a charity that funds research into finding cures for life-threatening illnesses that affect children, and an Ambassador for the Shackleton Foundation, which supports budding leaders and social entrepreneurs with inspirational projects that have the power to make a difference to the lives of disadvantaged and socially marginalised young people.

Sporting positions
Preceded by Todd Blackadder	All Blacks Captain; 2001	Succeeded by Reuben Thorne
