= Vea Taumoefolau =

New Zealand rugby union player

Vae Taumoefolau
- Born: 5 November 2001 (age 25) New Zealand
- Height: 186 cm (6 ft 1 in)
- Weight: 123 kg (271 lb; 19 st 5 lb)
- School: Sapporo Yamanote High School
- University: Kyoto Sangyo University

Rugby union career
- Position: Prop
- Current team: Crusaders / Tasman
Senior career
| Years | Team | Apps | (Points) |
| 2025–2026 | Toshiba Brave Lupus Tokyo | 10 | (0) |
| 2026– | Tasman | 4 | (0) |
| 2027– | Crusaders | 0 | (0) |
- Correct as of 9 November 2026

Vea Taumoefolau (born 5 November 2001) is a New Zealand rugby union player, who plays for the Crusaders. His preferred position is prop.

== Early career ==
Taumoefolau was born in New Zealand but moved to Japan as a child, attending Sapporo Yamanote High School where he played as a Number 8, earning comparisons to former Japan captain Michael Leitch. After high school, he attended Kyoto Sangyo University where he continued playing rugby, switching from backrow to prop. He is eligible for Japan, New Zealand, Samoa and Tonga at international level, and was named in Japan's wider squad in February 2026. Upon return to New Zealand, he played club rugby for Stoke in the Tasman region.

== Professional career ==
Taumoefolau turned professional when he signed for Toshiba Brave Lupus Tokyo in February 2024. He would debut for the side in the first round of the 2025–26 Japan Rugby League One – Division 1, making 10 appearances across the season, before returning to New Zealand at the end of the season. Having returned to New Zealand, Taumoefolau began representing Tasman in the National Provincial Championship, being named in their squad for the 2026 Hilux NPC competition. In October 2026, he was named in the Crusaders wider training group for the 2027 Super Rugby Pacific season.
