= Rory Scott =

Australian rugby union player

- Full name: Rory Argyle Scott
- Born: 15 September 2000 (age 26) Newcastle, New South Wales, Australia
- Height: 189 cm (6 ft 2 in)
- Weight: 110 kg (243 lb; 17 st 5 lb)
- School: Marist College Canberra
- University: University of South Australia

Rugby union career
- Position: Flanker
- Current team: Brumbies, Tasman
Senior career
Years	Team	Apps	(Points)
2021–	Brumbies	66	(20)
2026–	Tasman	11	(0)
- Correct as of 9 October 2026

Rory Scott is an Australian rugby union player who plays for the Brumbies in Super Rugby. His position is flanker. He was named in the Brumbies squad for the 2021 Super Rugby AU season. He made his debut in Round 6 of the 2021 Super Rugby AU season in the match against the Force.
