= Ethan Blackadder =

NZ rugby union player (born 1995)

- Born: 22 March 1995 (age 31) Rangiora, New Zealand
- Height: 1.90 m (6 ft 3 in)
- Weight: 111 kg (245 lb; 17 st 7 lb)
- School: Nelson College
- Notable relative: Todd Blackadder (father)

Rugby union career
- Position(s): Flanker, Number 8
- Current team: Tasman, Crusaders
Senior career
Years	Team	Apps	(Points)
2016–	Tasman	50	(45)
2018–	Crusaders	64	(55)
- Correct as of 15 November 2026
International career
Years	Team	Apps	(Points)
2021–	New Zealand	16	(5)
- Correct as of 15 November 2026

Ethan J. Blackadder (born 22 March 1995) is a New Zealand rugby union player who plays for Tasman in the Bunnings NPC and the Crusaders in the Super Rugby competition. His position is flanker. He is the son of former All Blacks player Todd Blackadder.

== Early career ==
Blackadder played his club rugby for the Nelson Rugby Club. He was educated at Nelson College from 2008 to 2012.

== Tasman ==
Blackadder made his debut for Tasman in Round 4 of the 2016 Mitre 10 Cup against Otago in Dunedin. He was part of the Tasman team that won the Mitre 10 Cup for the first time in 2019. Blackadder missed the 2020 Mitre 10 Cup with injury as the Mako went on to win their second premiership title in a row.

== Crusaders ==
Blackadder was named in the Crusaders squad for the 2018 Super Rugby season. He made his debut against the Sunwolves in Round 10 and was later named Crusaders rookie of the year. Blackadder played every minute of the Crusaders 24–13 win over the Chiefs in the 2021 Super Rugby Aotearoa final as the side won their fifth title in a row. After an outstanding season Blackadder was voted Champion Crusader of the Year by his teammates at the 2021 Crusaders awards. Blackadder suffered a season ending injury late in the 2022 Super Rugby Pacific season as the Crusaders went on to a 7–21 win over the Blues in the final.

== All Blacks ==
After an outstanding 2021 Super Rugby season Blackadder was named in the All Blacks squad to play Tonga and Fiji in the July Steinlager Series. He made his debut against Tonga at Mount Smart Stadium, coming off the bench in a 102–0 win for the All Blacks – becoming All Black number 1195. He was named in the travelling squad for the 2021 Rugby Championship and the end of year tour of Europe. Blackadder was not selected in the All Blacks World Cup squad for the 2023 competition, however was called in as injury cover.
