= Mason Lund =

New Zealand rugby union player (born 2002)

- Born: 14 January 2002 (age 24) Tākaka, New Zealand
- School: Nelson College

Rugby union career
- Position: Halfback
- Current team: Tasman
Senior career
Years	Team	Apps	(Points)
2024–	Tasman	8	(0)
- Correct as of 19 September 2026

Mason Lund (born 14 January 2002) is a New Zealand rugby union player who plays for Tasman in the Bunnings NPC. His position is halfback.

== Career ==
Lund was named in the Tasman development squad for the 2024 Bunnings NPC, he made his debut for the side in Round 3 against Counties Manukau, coming off the bench in a 3–48 win for the Mako.

Lund was educated at Nelson College from 2015 to 2019.
