= Johnny Lee (rugby union) =

New Zealand rugby union player

- Born: 4 March 2004 (age 22) New Zealand
- School: Christ's College

Rugby union career
- Position(s): Flanker, Number 8
- Current team: Tasman, Crusaders
Senior career
Years	Team	Apps	(Points)
2024–	Tasman	22	(25)
2026–	Crusaders	7	(10)
- Correct as of 9 October 2026
International career
Years	Team	Apps	(Points)
2024	New Zealand U20	7	(0)
- Correct as of 9 October 2026

Jonathan Lee (born 4 March 2004) is a New Zealand rugby union player who plays for Tasman in the Bunnings NPC. His position is Flanker or Number 8.

== Career ==
Lee has represented New Zealand U20. He was named in the Tasman development squad for the 2024 Bunnings NPC, he made his debut for the side in Round 4 against Bay of Plenty, coming off the bench in a 34–15 win for the Mako.
