= Cooper Roberts =

New Zealand rugby union player (born 2005)

- Born: 19 January 2005 (age 21) New Zealand
- Height: 188 cm (6 ft 2 in)
- Weight: 97 kg (214 lb; 15 st 4 lb)
- School: Marlborough Boys' College

Rugby union career
- Position: Midfielder
- Current team: Crusaders, Tasman
Senior career
Years	Team	Apps	(Points)
2024–	Tasman	19	(30)
2026–	Crusaders	1	(0)
- Correct as of 9 October 2026
International career
Years	Team	Apps	(Points)
2025	New Zealand U20	7	(5)
- Correct as of 9 October 2026

Cooper Roberts (born 19 January 2005) is a New Zealand rugby union player, who plays for the Crusaders and Tasman. His preferred position is midfield.

== Early career ==
Roberts attended Marlborough Boys' College where he played for the first XV. In 2023, he was named in the New Zealand Barbarians squad, and joined the Crusaders academy in the same year, representing their U20 side in 2025. In 2025, he represented the New Zealand U20 side.

== Professional career ==
Roberts has represented Tasman in the National Provincial Championship since 2024, being named in the squad for the 2025 Bunnings NPC. He was named in the Crusaders wider training group for the 2026 Super Rugby Pacific season. He made his debut for the Crusaders in a win against the Hurricanes at One New Zealand Stadium on the 29th of May 2026, coming off the bench.
