= Monu Moli =

New Zealand rugby union player

- Born: 19 August 2002 (age 24) Gisborne, New Zealand
- Height: 182 cm (6 ft 0 in)
- Weight: 105 kg (16 st 7 lb; 231 lb)
- School: Marlborough Boys' College
- Notable relative(s): Atu Moli (brother), Sam Moli (brother)

Rugby union career
- Position(s): Hooker, Prop
- Current team: Tasman
Senior career
Years	Team	Apps	(Points)
2023–	Tasman	22	(0)
2025–2026	Moana Pasifika	3	(0)
- Correct as of 9 October 2026
International career
Years	Team	Apps	(Points)
2022	New Zealand U20	3	(0)
- Correct as of 9 October 2026

Lavengamonu H. A. Moli (born 19 August 2002) is a New Zealand rugby union player who plays for Tasman in the Bunnings NPC. His position is Hooker or Prop. He is the brother of former All Black Atu Moli and Tongan international Sam Moli.

== Career ==
Moli played 3 games for New Zealand Under 20 in 2022. Moli made his debut for Tasman in Round 5 of the 2023 Bunnings NPC against Manawatu at Trafalgar Park, coming off the bench in a 58–19 win for the Mako.
