= Gordon Bell (surgeon) =

New Zealand surgeon and academic

Sir Gordon Bell KBE MC
- Born: Francis Gordon Bell; 13 September 1887; Marlborough, New Zealand
- Died: 28 February 1970 (aged 82); Dunedin, New Zealand
- Education: Marlborough High School; University of Edinburgh
- Occupation: Surgeon
- Known for: Presidency of the Royal Australasian College of Surgeons
- Medical career
- Institutions: Royal Infirmary of Edinburgh; University of Otago

Sir Francis Gordon Bell (13 September 1887 – 28 February 1970) was a New Zealand surgeon who was professor of surgery at the University of Otago at Dunedin. He was a founder member of the Royal Australasian College of Surgeons and was elected its president in 1947. In the 1953 Coronation Honours, Bell was appointed a Knight Commander of the Order of the British Empire.

== Early life and education ==
Bell was born at Northbank Station on the Wairau River in Marlborough, New Zealand, on 13 September 1887. He was the son of William Bell, a sheep farmer and his wife Emma Amelia Dolamore, a schoolmistress and daughter of New Zealand's first Baptist clergyman, Decimus Dolamore. He was educated at Marlborough High School (later Marlborough Boys' College) where he was captain of rugby and vice captain of cricket. He then went to the University of Edinburgh to study medicine. Here he won the Vans Dunlop Scholarship in anatomy in 1908, going on to graduate MB ChB with first class honours in 1910. He then spent four years combining clinical work with research and demonstrating in the University Anatomy Department. He became a Fellow of the Royal College of Surgeons of England in 1912. Under the direction of the neurologist Alexander Bruce, he completed a thesis on the development and microscopic appearance of the occipital lobes of the brain for which he was awarded the degree of Doctor of Medicine (MD) in 1912 and for which he won the Goodsir Memorial Fellowship, named for John Goodsir an earlier professor of anatomy.

== Early surgical career ==
In 1912 Bell started his clinical career in the Royal Infirmary of Edinburgh (RIE) as house surgeon to Professor Alexis Thomson and went on to resident surgical officer (RSO) posts at the Stanley Hospital, Liverpool and in Salford Royal Hospital, Manchester. A visit to Professor August Bier's department at the Charité Hospital in Berlin was followed by a fellowship to the Mayo Clinic in Rochester, Minnesota, which he took up at the start of World War I.

Bell returned to Britain in 1915 and joined the Royal Army Medical Corps (RAMC). He was posted to France with the 20th General Hospital and in 1916 joined casualty clearing station (CCS) number 21 as a surgical specialist. During the four and a half months of the Battle of the Somme he gained his first experience of military surgery. He was promoted to major and then transferred to number 48 CCS and, with this unit, he was heavily involved in the treatment of casualties from all the major Western Front battles of 1917 and 1918. For his service to the wounded he was awarded the Military Cross in 1916 and was mentioned in dispatches.

== Later career ==
After demobilisation in 1919 Bell returned to Edinburgh and from 1920 to 1923 he was clinical tutor in the RIE under Professor Alexis Thomson. In 1924 he was appointed assistant surgeon to the RIE. During this period he studied the development and histological appearance of the various types of testicular tumours. His conclusions, published in two important publications in 1925, came to be regarded as a significant contribution to the understanding of the development and classification of these tumours. In 1925 he was appointed to the chair of surgery at the University of Otago in Dunedin, New Zealand. Here he actively promoted the establishment of specialist surgical units and their integration into the university department of surgery. At a meeting held in Dunedin in 1927, the first steps towards the establishment of an Australasian College of Surgeons were taken and Bell was an enthusiastic supporter. He was a foundation Fellow of the Royal Australasian College of Surgeons (RACS) and played an increasingly active part in its affairs both in New Zealand and in Australia.

During World War II with the depletion of academic staff on military duty, and an increase in medical student numbers, he took on much of the increased teaching commitment of his department. He retired in 1952 and was succeeded by Professor (later Sir) Michael Woodruff.

In 1964 he published, with Sir Charles Hercus, a history of the Otago medical school and his autobiography Surgeon's Saga was published in 1968.

== Honours and awards ==
Bell was president of the RACS between 1947 and 1949. In 1952 he became an honorary Fellow of the Royal Society of Medicine. In the 1953 Coronation Honours, he was appointed a Knight Commander of the Order of the British Empire.

== Personal life ==
On 15 March 1916 Bell married Marion Welsh Berry Austin in Edinburgh. She ran a Red Cross convalescent hospital, and was awarded the Florence Nightingale Medal for this work. They were to have three daughters and one son.

== Death and legacy ==
Bell died in Dunedin on 28 February 1970. He is commemorated by an annual RACS eponymous lecture and by the Sir Gordon Bell prize in surgery awarded by the University of Otago medical school.
