= Macca Springer =

New Zealand rugby union player

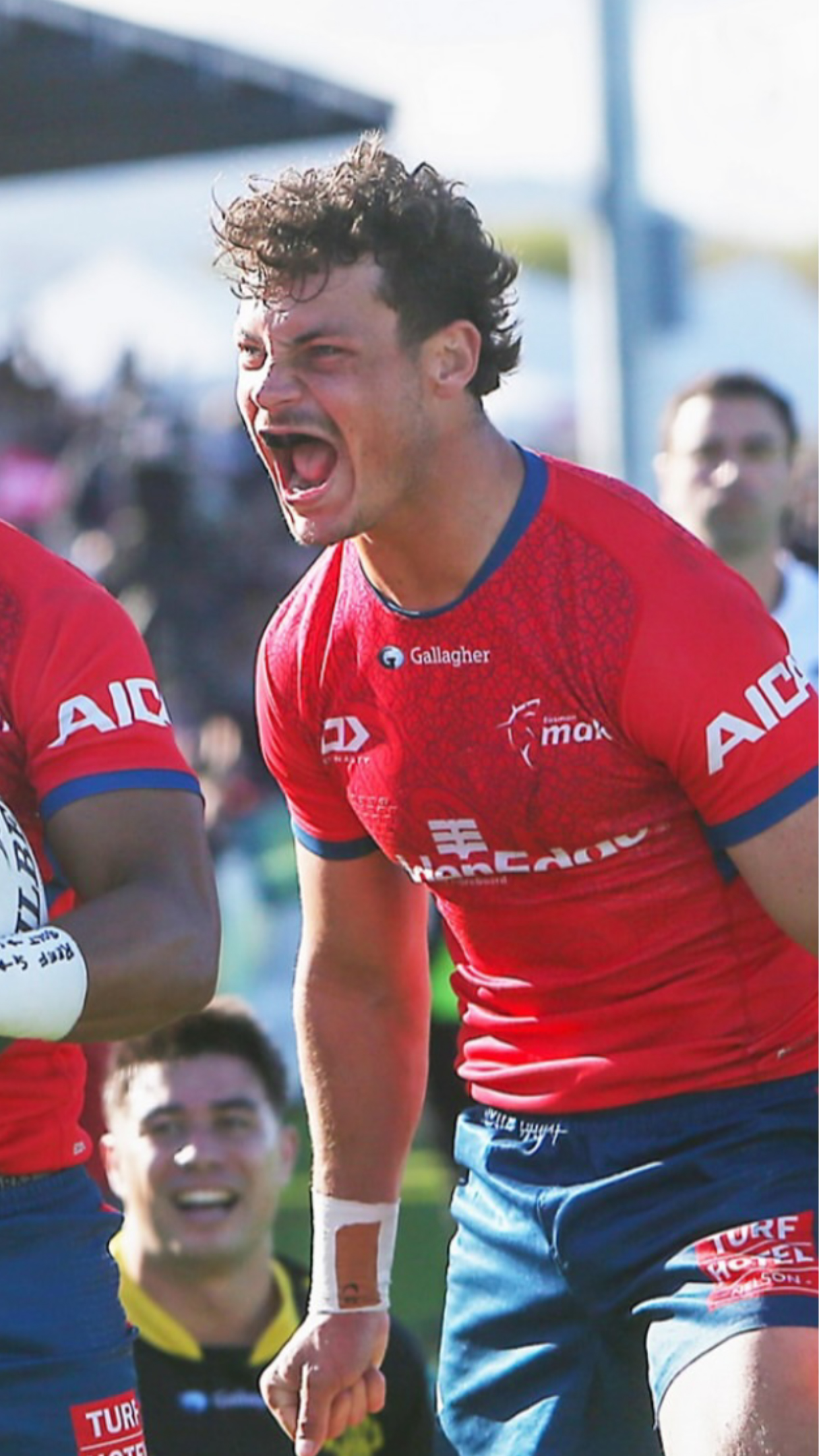
- Springer playing for Tasman Mako in the Bunnings NPC
- Born: 29 March 2003 (age 23) New Zealand
- Height: 190 cm (6 ft 3 in)
- Weight: 98 kg (216 lb; 15 st 6 lb)
- School: Waimea College

Rugby union career
- Position(s): Fullback, Wing
- Current team: Tasman, Crusaders
Senior career
| Years | Team | Apps | (Points) |
| 2021– | Tasman | 50 | (140) |
| 2023– | Crusaders | 31 | (80) |
- Correct as of 3 October 2026
International career
| Years | Team | Apps | (Points) |
| 2022–2023 | New Zealand U20 | 8 | (40) |
- Correct as of 3 October 2026

McKay Springer (born 29 March 2003), known as "Macca", is a New Zealand rugby union player who plays for Tasman in the National Provincial Championship (NPC) and the Crusaders in Super Rugby. His position is fullback or wing.

== Career ==
In 2021 Springer was named as part of the Crusaders under 20 side for the Super Rugby Aotearoa Under 20 competition. He was named in the Tasman Mako squad as a development player for the 2021 Bunnings NPC. Springer made his debut for the Mako in Round 4 of the competition, coming off the bench against Waikato at Trafalgar Park. The side went on to make the final before losing 23–20 to Waikato. Springer made his debut for the Crusaders in Round 1 of the 2023 Super Rugby Pacific season against the Chiefs.

Springer set the Super Rugby record for most tries in one game (tied with Sean Wainui) with 5 tries vs the Force during round 5 of the 2025 Super Rugby season.
