= Tasman (National Provincial Championship) =

NZ rugby union club, based in Tasman Bay

- Official logo
- Union: Tasman Rugby Union
- Nickname: Mako
- Founded: 2006; 20 years ago
- Location: Tasman Bay / Te Tai-o-Aorere, New Zealand
- Ground(s): Lansdowne Park (Capacity: 15,000); Trafalgar Park (Capacity: 18,000)
- CEO: Julie Bensemann
- Coach: Jono Phillips
- Captain: Johnny Lee
- Most appearances: Quentin MacDonald (126)
- Top scorer: Marty Banks (628)
- Most tries: David Havili (29)
- League: National Provincial Championship
- 2026: 7th
Team kit

Official website
- www.mako.nz

Tasman (often known as the Tasman Mako and formerly Tasman Makos) are a New Zealand professional rugby union team based in Tasman Bay / Te Tai-o-Aorere, New Zealand. Established in 2006, they play in the National Provincial Championship. They play their home games at Lansdowne Park in Blenheim or Trafalgar Park in Nelson. The team is affiliated with the Crusaders Super Rugby franchise. Their home playing colours are red and blue.

== Current squad ==
The Tasman Mako squad for the 2026 Hilux NPC season is:

2026 Tasman squad
**Props**: (New Zealand) Ryan Coxon; (New Zealand) Tom Heywood; (New Zealand) **Tyrel Lomax**; (New Zealand) Sione Mafi; (New Zealand) Isaiah Malaulau ^{DEV} (Note: Malaulau wasn't named in the original Tasman squad, but was named in the side for Round 4.); (New Zealand) Sam Matenga (injured) (Note: Expected to be unavailable for all or most of the season due to injury.); (New Zealand) Monu Moli; (New Zealand) Kershawl Sykes-Martin; (New Zealand) Vea Taumoefolau; (New Zealand) Jake Wetere ^{DEV} (Note: Wetere wasn't named in the original Tasman squad, but was announced in the side for Round 6.); **Hookers**: (Samoa) **Richie Asiata**; (New Zealand) Dylan Irvine; (New Zealand) Eli Oudenryn; **Locks**: (Australia) Lopeti Faifua; (New Zealand) Jake Frost; (New Zealand) Hunter Leppien; (New Zealand) Antonio Shalfoon	**Loose forwards**: (New Zealand) **Ethan Blackadder**; (New Zealand) **Shannon Frizell**; (New Zealand) Tayne Hemopo; (New Zealand) Harry Horncastle ^{DEV} (Note: Horncastle wasn’t named in the original Tasman squad, but was announced in the side for the Quarter-final.); (New Zealand) Johnny Lee **(c)**; (New Zealand) Matt Lowe; (Australia) Rory Scott; **Halfbacks (scrum-halves)**: (New Zealand) **Finlay Christie** (injured) (Note: Expected to be unavailable for all or most of the season due to injury.); (New Zealand) **Mitchell Drummond**; (New Zealand) **Noah Hotham**; (New Zealand) Mason Lund; (New Zealand) Wil Thornalley; **First five-eighths (fly-halves)**: (New Zealand) Cooper Grant; (Tonga) **William Havili**; (New Zealand) Taine Robinson	**Midfielders (centres)**: (New Zealand) **Leicester Faingaʻanuku**; (New Zealand) **David Havili**; (New Zealand) Jake Pacey ^{DEV} (Note: Pacey wasn't named in the original Tasman squad, but was announced in the side for Round 3.); (New Zealand) Cooper Roberts; (New Zealand) Nic Sauira; **Outside backs**: (New Zealand) Jack Gray; (New Zealand) Fletcher Hewitt-Smart ^{DEV} (Note: Hewitt-Smart wasn't named in the original Tasman squad, but was announced in the side for Round 3.); (New Zealand) **Will Jordan**; (New Zealand) Maloni Kunawave; (New Zealand) Leo Marfell ^{DEV} (Note: Marfell wasn't named in the original Tasman squad, but was announced in the side for Round 1.); (New Zealand) Timi Sauira ^{DEV} (Note: Timi Sauira wasn't named in the original Tasman squad, but was announced in the side for Round 3.); (New Zealand) Macca Springer; (Tonga) **Kyren Taumoefolau**; (New Zealand) **Timoci Tavatavanawai**
**(c)** denotes the team captain. **Bold** denotes internationally capped players.^{DEV} denotes a development squad member. denotes an injured player. Source:

== Honours ==
Tasman have been overall Champions twice, winning the title in 2019 and 2020. Their full list of honours include:

ITM Cup Championship Division

- Winners: 2013

Mitre 10 Cup Premiership Division

- Winners: 2019, 2020

== Current Super Rugby players ==
Players named in the 2026 Tasman Mako squad, who also earned contracts or were named in a squad for any side participating in the 2026 Super Rugby Pacific season.

Player	Team
Richie Asiata	Reds
Ethan Blackadder	Crusaders
Finlay Christie	Blues
Mitchell Drummond	Crusaders
Lopeti Faifua	Force
Leicester Faingaʻanuku	Crusaders
Cooper Grant	Crusaders
David Havili	Crusaders
William Havili	Moana Pasifika
Noah Hotham	Crusaders
Will Jordan	Crusaders
Maloni Kunawave	Crusaders
Johnny Lee	Crusaders
Tyrel Lomax	Hurricanes
Sam Matenga	Blues
Monu Moli	Moana Pasifika
Taine Robinson	Highlanders
Rory Scott	Brumbies
Antonio Shalfoon	Crusaders
Macca Springer	Crusaders
Kershawl Sykes-Martin	Crusaders
Kyren Taumoefolau	Chiefs
Timoci Tavatavanawai	Highlanders
