= Todd Blackadder =

NZ rugby union player (born 1971)

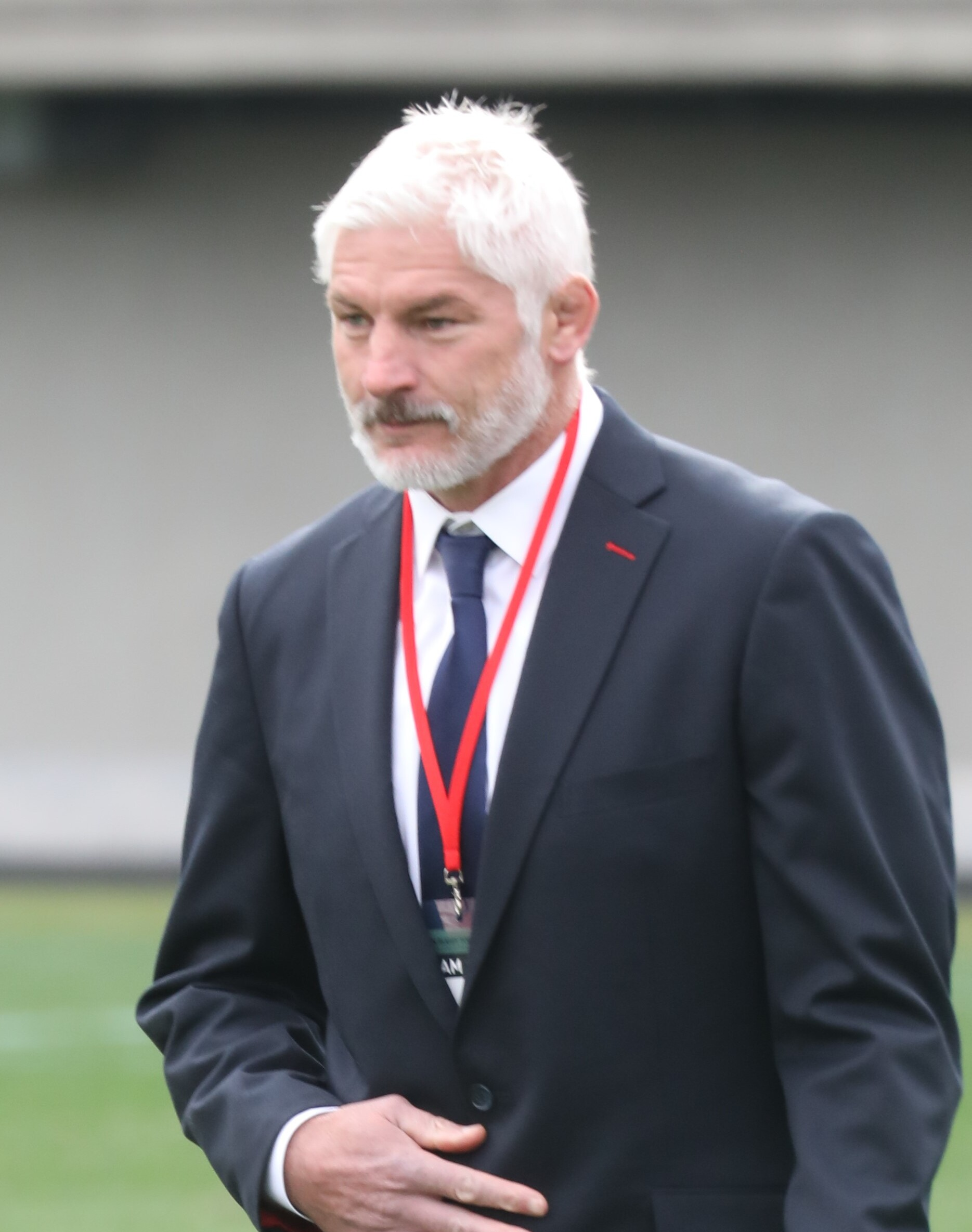
- Blackadder in 2020
- Born: Todd Julian Blackadder; 20 September 1971 (age 55) Rangiora, Canterbury, New Zealand
- Height: 1.93 m (6 ft 4 in)
- Weight: 100 kg (15 st 10 lb; 220 lb)
- School: Rangiora High School
- Notable relative: Ethan Blackadder (son)

Rugby union career
- Position: Lock
Senior career
Years	Team	Apps	(Points)
2001–2004	Edinburgh	41	(15)
Provincial / State sides
Years	Team	Apps	(Points)
1990–2001	Canterbury	129	(176)
Super Rugby
Years	Team	Apps	(Points)
1996–2001	Crusaders	71	(30)
International career
Years	Team	Apps	(Points)
1995–2000	New Zealand	12	(5)
Coaching career
- Years: Team
- 2004–2005: Edinburgh Gunners (Assistant)
- 2008: Tasman
- 2009–2016: Crusaders
- 2016–2019: Bath (Director of Rugby)
- 2019–2026: Toshiba Brave Lupus
- 2026–: Toshiba Brave Lupus (Director of High Perf.)

Todd Blackadder (born 20 September 1971) is a retired New Zealand rugby union player and professional rugby coach. He played 12 tests (25 games) for the All Blacks, and had 14 appearances as captain. Blackadder captained the Crusaders to three Super Rugby titles during his time with the franchise. He also won two National Provincial Championship titles with Canterbury. Blackadder coached the Crusaders for eight seasons from 2009 to 2016.

Blackadder began his career as a blindside flanker but switched to lock in 1998.

== Early years ==
Blackadder was born in Rangiora, New Zealand, where he grew up on his grandfather's dairy farm, and took after his father and uncles by playing for the local rugby club. He attended Rangiora College, but did not make the 1st XV in his time there. When he left school, Blackadder moved north to Collingwood to take up a welding apprenticeship. While there, he played club rugby and impressed age-group selectors for Nelson Bays, which led to him eventually being selected for the New Zealand Under 19 tour of Australia. Blackadder left his welding apprenticeship to return to dairy farming, and found work on the farm of Brian McKay, the father of a friend in Collingwood. Blackadder and McKay's daughter Priscilla married, and they returned to Rangiora where Blackadder had various jobs as a security guard and courier.

== Playing career ==
Blackadder made his senior representative debut for Nelson Bays against Marlborough in 1990.

=== NPC ===
Blackadder made his debut for Canterbury in 1991. In 1997 Blackadder led Canterbury to its first NPC title in 14 years when they defeated Counties Manukau 44–13 in the final. Blackadder also won the Ranfurly Shield on several occasions including defeating Waikato in 1994 while he was also present when Canterbury ended Waikato's three-year stranglehold on the shield in 2000. Blackadder played 126 games for Canterbury over his 11 years for the province. His final game for Canterbury was the 2001 NPC final against Otago which Canterbury won 30–19.

=== Super Rugby ===
Blackadder was part of the inaugural Crusaders team in 1996 and would go on to lead the side to its first Super Rugby title in 1998. They defeated the Blues in the final 20–13. Blackadder led the Crusaders to three consecutive Super Rugby championships in the 1999 and 2000 seasons, laying the foundations for the Crusaders' status as the most successful franchise in Super Rugby history.

=== International career ===
Blackadder played at the inaugural Rugby World Cup Sevens in 1993. He was called in to the side as an injury replacement for Marc Ellis.

Blackadder was first selected for the All Blacks in 1995 and made his test debut against England at Dunedin on 20 June 1998. Blackadder was dropped from the All Blacks under John Hart, and missed the 1999 Rugby World Cup. New Zealand's loss to France in the semi-finals resulted in Hart resigning from the coaching role. Following Hart's departure, Wayne Smith was appointed head coach, and Blackadder was recalled to the team and named captain, succeeding Taine Randell. The decision was met with fanfare by some who liked Blackadders simple and uncomplicated approach. However, his locking ability and role leading the All Blacks were often under the microscope from the public and media, even as players like All Blacks great Jonah Lomu stated that he was one of the finest captains he ever played under. Following one season captaining the All Blacks, Blackadder failed to make the 30-man squad in the lead up to the Tri-Nations, and was replaced as captain by hooker Anton Oliver.

=== Scotland ===
Blackadder departed New Zealand for Scotland at the end of 2001, joining Scottish side Edinburgh Gunners.

== Coaching career ==
Blackadder was named as assistant forwards coach of Scotland, under Matt Williams. He became the forwards coach of the Edinburgh Gunners under Frank Hadden. When Hadden left Edinburgh to replace Matt Williams in the national coaching role in 2005, Blackadder was named as Edinburgh's head coach for the remainder of the season.

Blackadder confirmed his departure from Edinburgh to return to New Zealand in 2006.

=== Tasman ===
On his return to New Zealand, Blackadder took up a role as the director of rugby for the new Tasman Rugby Union, formed from an amalgamation of the Nelson Bays and Marlborough unions. While working with Tasman, Blackadder also worked in an advisory capacity with Robbie Deans and the Crusaders.

In 2007, Tasman coach Dennis Brown stepped down, and Blackadder stepped in as coach for the 2008 Air New Zealand Cup. In only their second year Tasman finished the 2008 season with four wins, one draw, and six losses.

=== Crusaders ===
Following the departure of coach Robbie Deans from the Crusaders, Blackadder was named as the sides new head coach ahead of the 2009 Super 14 Rugby Season. After a shaky start to the season with only one win from five games, the Blackadder coached Crusaders finished the season with eight wins, one draw, and four losses. They reached the semi-finals, losing to eventual champions the Bulls in Pretoria.

In his second year in charge, the Crusaders were the only New Zealand team to advance to the playoffs, but again fell to the Bulls in the semi-finals.

During the 2011 season, the Crusaders were dislodged from their home ground, Jade Stadium due to structural damage caused in Christchurch by the 2010 Canterbury earthquake, and the 2011 Christchurch earthquake. They played their home games at a number of venues throughout the Crusaders catchment area. Despite the disruption, the Crusaders managed to make the final that year, before falling to the Queensland Reds, who won their first title.

In 2012, the Crusaders were knocked out by eventual first-time champions the Chiefs in the semi-finals.

In 2013, the Crusaders again fell to the Chiefs in the semi-final, and the Chiefs went on to their second consecutive championship.

In the 2014 season, the Crusaders returned to the final but again fell short, this time against the New South Wales Waratahs after a controversial last minute penalty goal.

In 2015, the Crusaders failed to make the knockout rounds for the first time in Blackadder's tenure. Despite this, the Crusaders extended his contract for another year. In late 2015, it was announced that the 2016 Super Rugby Season would be Blackadder's last as coach.

In his final season as coach the Crusaders were knocked out in the quarter finals by the eventual runner-up Lions.

During his time coaching the Crusaders, Blackadder guided the side to two Super Rugby Finals, and had a total record of 85 wins, 3 draws, and 45 losses from 133 games coached.

=== Bath ===
Blackadder was appointed Director of Rugby at Bath Rugby ahead of the 2016–17 Premiership Rugby season. He was joined at Bath by his assistant coach from the Crusaders, Tabai Matson, who took on the role of head coach. When Matson was forced to return home to New Zealand due to a family illness, Blackadder took over the coaching position. During his time as coach, the club was unable to reach finish better than the top six. On 17 April 2019, it was announced that he would be leaving the club at the end of the 2018–19 season.

=== Toshiba ===
On his release from his final year of his contract with Bath, Blackadder revealed that he would be taking on the role of head coach with the Toshiba Brave Lupus in the Japanese Top League. While at Toshiba, Blackadder won two titles (2023–24, 2024–25), achieving their first Japanese rugby title in 14 years.

In July 2026, Blackadder became Toshiba's Director of High Performance, standing down as head coach after seven years in charge, the longest-serving head coach in the Japan Rugby League One. His position was filled by Josh Syms, a former head coach of Hawke's Bay.

== Personal life ==
Todd had a son, Ethan, who also plays rugby union. He represented Tasman in the National Provincial Championship, and in 2018 made his debut for the Crusaders in Super Rugby. He also played for New Zealand at Test level, making his debut as an All Black against Tonga at Mount Smart Stadium in 2021. He came off the bench in the 102–0 victory, becoming All Black No. 1195. Todd and Ethan Blackadder became the 21st father–son combination to have played for the All Blacks.

Sporting positions
Preceded by Taine Randell	All Blacks Captain; 2000	Succeeded by Anton Oliver
