= Marlborough Boys' College =

Location
- 5 Stephenson Street; Blenheim 7201; New Zealand; 41°31′08″S 173°57′20″E

Information
- Type: State Single-Sex Boys' Secondary (Year 9–13)
- Motto: Latin: Virtutem Doctrina Parat (Learning Prepares for Life)
- Established: 1899 (as Marlborough High School); 1963 (as Marlborough Boys' College)
- Ministry of Education Institution no.: 288
- Chairperson: Tim Burfoot
- Principal: Jarrod Dunn
- Gender: Male
- Enrolment: 1,024 (July 2026)
- Socio-economic decile: 7
- Website: mbc.school.nz

Marlborough Boys' College is a state single-sex secondary school in Blenheim, New Zealand. The school was established as Marlborough High School in 1899 (renamed Marlborough College in 1919). The school in its current form was established in 1963, after Marlborough Girls' College was split off. Serving Years 9 to 13, the college has 1,024 students as of July 2026.

== History ==
=== Overview ===
The first board of Marlborough High School met on 13 November 1899. Three acres on Stephenson Street (1.2 hectares) were purchased for £600 and another 3 acres (12,000 m^{2}) were donated by Thomas Carter, taking the grounds through to Francis Street. Dr John Innes was appointed the first Head Teacher. The school opened in the Church Of Nativity Sunday School building on Alfred Street, on 26 March 1900, with 18 pupils attending on the first day. The cornerstone for the first school building on the Stephenson Street site was laid on 22 September 1900.

Marlborough High School was co-educational and fee paying with free places to those who could not afford it but who had proved themselves able in the proficiency examination. The change in name from Marlborough High School to Marlborough College was made in 1919.

In 1926 Mr Stewart (Headmaster) was awarded a travelling scholarship to visit junior high schools in Canada and the United States. The department of education was interested in incorporating a Junior High (Intermediate) into the college structure. In 1927 an intermediate (forms 1 and 2 or years 7 and 8 in current terminology) was established on the site with 275 pupils taking the total roll to 557. The intermediate continued on the site until 1957, when roll pressures required the establishment of Bohally Intermediate on Mclauchlan Street.

In 1963 the Marlborough Girls' College was founded and Marlborough Boys' College continued on the original site. The first official discussion on the division of the college having taken place in June 1947. Mr Insull, the Headmaster at the time, suggested that “the time would come when the board would have to consider the question of separate boys’ and girls’ schools ... and that the girls school might be established on the other side of town (Mclauchlan Street)". (Marlborough Express, June 10, 1947)

=== X Static FM89 ===
X Static FM was a radio station in the Marlborough Region of New Zealand which originated as a Marlborough College-based radio station, X-Static FM operated by The X-Static Society. The station was based at the college and broadcast on 89FM with the callsign 2STA. Two years earlier the school ran a temporary radio station as part of a school fundraiser called Artyfacts FM. This station was the first FM broadcast in the South Island. X- Static went on air in February 1986 and only operated on a part-time basis during school lunch times and some evenings. The station was rebranded as Marlborough's 89FM in 1988 and remained at Marlborough Boys' College until 1989 when the station moved to new premises at the Blenheim Post Office Building; by this time the station was broadcasting from 6AM to 12AM. In 1990 the X-Static Society in partnership with Fifeshire FM from Nelson launched a new station Sounds 93FM using a commercial frequency purchased at auction from the government. Sounds FM broadcast in both Picton, Blenheim and Kaikoura.

=== Marlborough High School building development 1900–1919 ===
- 1901 – Old School Building opened
- 1902 – Nosworthy House purchased as Headmaster residence or Rectory (on site of present technology faculty)
- 1910 – Tower added to old school
- 1910 – First gymnasium built
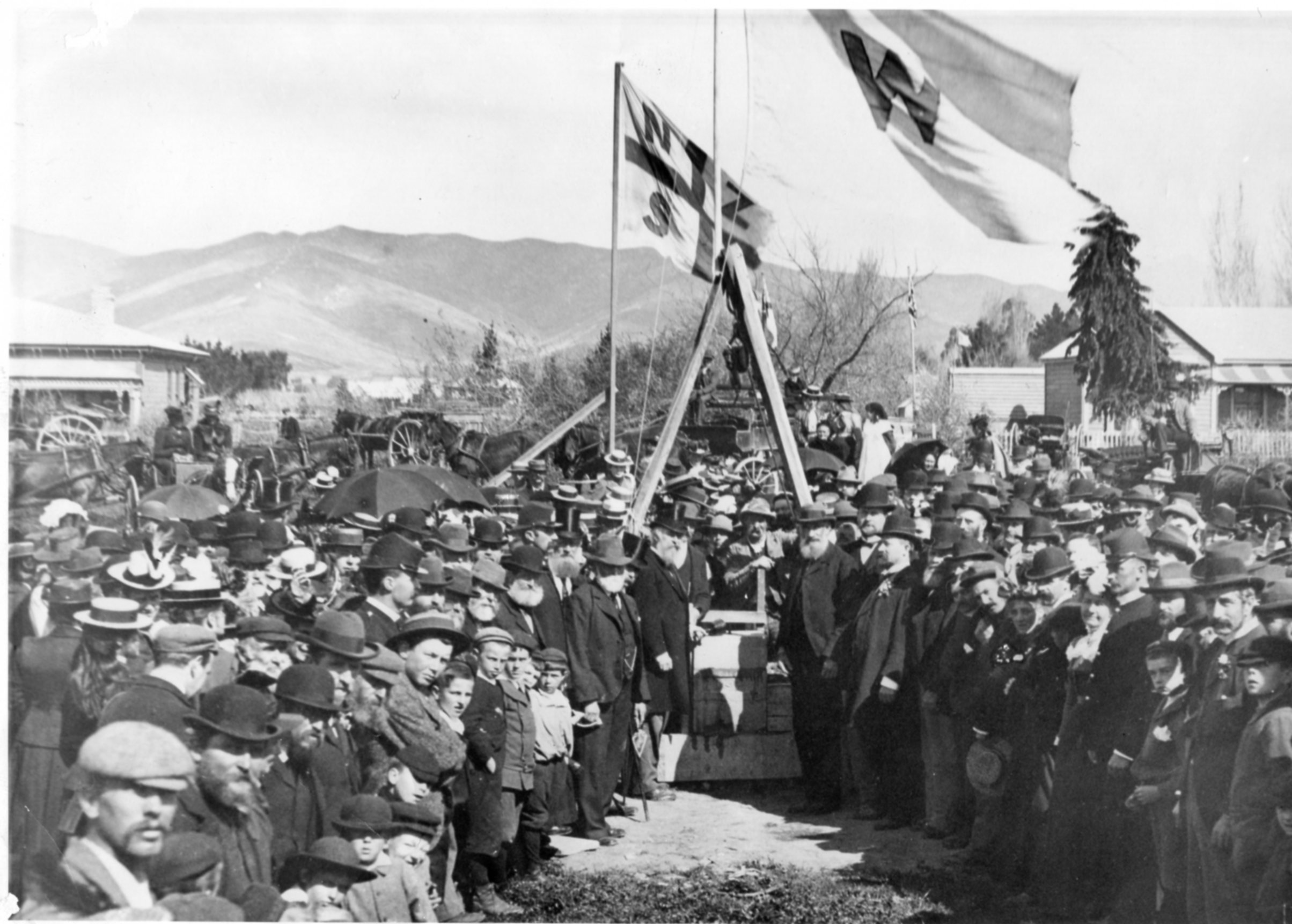
Laying of foundation stone at the Stephenson Street site on 22 September 1900

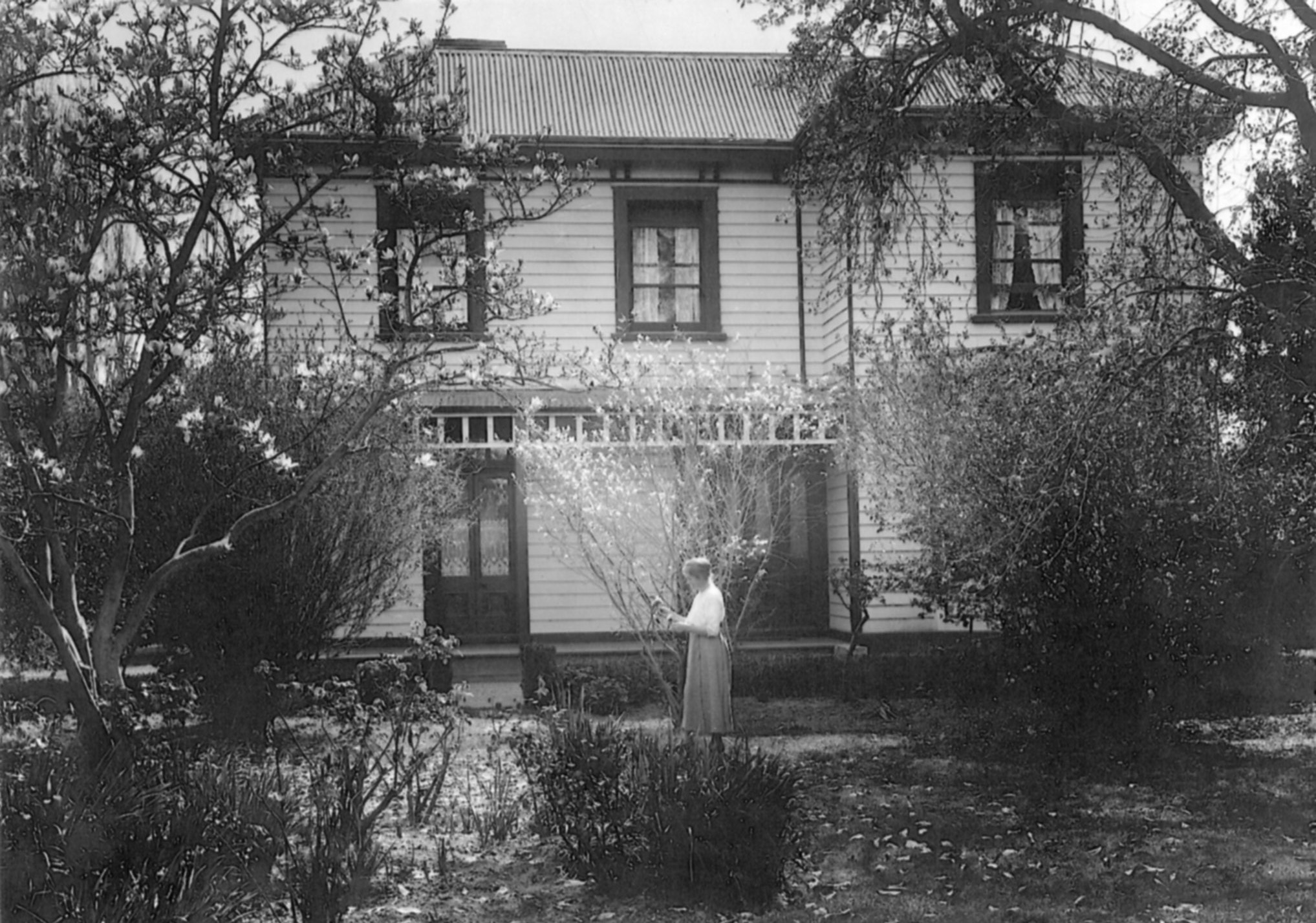
Noseworthy House, the headmaster's house in 1910

The college is located off Stephenson Street, with a large white building housing the English, maths and languages departments on the street front. In 2003–04 a new hall was built to the rear of the complex, and the music department was updated to include new music suites. It has a small swimming pool and is located in the vicinity of St Mary's church.

=== Proposed relocation ===
The intention to relocate both Marlborough Boys' College and Marlborough Girls' College on the site currently occupied by MGC and Bohally Intermediate is being planned by a consortium led by construction company Naylor Love. Bohally Intermediate would relocate to the current MBC site on Stephenson Street. The relocation plan was scrapped in 2024. Marlborough Boys’ College (MBC) is undergoing a major multi-year redevelopment, with construction ramping up in 2026, including a new Innovation and Technology Block, gymnasium, and site-wide upgrades. Following a 2024 decision to scrap the full co-location with Marlborough Girls' College, the Ministry of Education is now focusing on in-situ redevelopment of the existing campus. The Science Block has already been redeveloped as of March 2026.

=== House Systems ===
Like many New Zealand secondary schools, Marlborough Boys' College uses a house system to organise students into groups that compete in sporting, cultural, and academic events throughout the year. The house system encourages teamwork and participation. Students are placed into one of several houses when they enter the school in their first academic year, Each house usually includes students from different year levels and is supported by staff members who act as house leaders.

Houses compete in events such as athletics, swimming sports, and other inter-house competitions, with points awarded for participation and results. House winners may be rewarded a price, but varies by year.

There are four houses for each of the four rivers in the Wairau Region, Awatere, Waihopai, Ōpaoa and Wairau.

== Principals ==
- John Innes (1900–1922)
- John Stewart (1922–1946)
- Herbert A H Insull (1946–1964)
- Dugald S McKenzie (1964–1981)
- Peter J Voss (1982–1991)
- John Rodgers (1992–2009)
- Dave Turnbull (Interim Principal, Terms 3–4 2009)
- Wayne Hegarty (2010–2019)
- Jeremy Marshall (Interim Principal 2020)
- John Kendal (2021–2024)
- Jarrod Dunn (2025-Current)

== Notable alumni ==
=== Sport ===
==== Cricket ====
- Cyril Allcott — New Zealand Test cricketer
- Ma'ara Ave — Cook Island cricketer
- Gary Bartlett — New Zealand Test cricketer
- Geoff Barnett — Canadian international cricketer
- Carl Bulfin — New Zealand cricketer
- Fen Cresswell — New Zealand cricketer
- Brendon Diamanti — New Zealand cricketer
- Ben Wheeler — New Zealand cricketer

==== Cycling ====
- Jason Allen — professional cyclist, track world cup champion
- Graeme Miller — double Commonwealth Games gold medallist in cycling
- Robin Reid — professional cyclist, Olympian

==== Football ====
- Michael O'Keeffe — New Zealand football representative

==== Rugby union ====
- Dylan Hayes – Top 14
- David Hill — All Black
- Leon MacDonald — All Black, and Head Coach
- Quentin MacDonald — Super Rugby player, Crusaders
- Atu Moli — All Black
- Sam Moli — Tongan Rugby International
- Toby Morland — Super Rugby player (multiple franchises)
- Ben O'Keeffe — international rugby referee, New Zealand
- Anton Oliver — All Black
- Kade Poki — Super Rugby player, Highlanders
- Alan Sutherland — All Black
- Kyren Taumoefolau – Super Rugby player (multiple franchises), Tongan Rugby International
- Joe Wheeler — Super Rugby player, Highlanders and Media Personality
- Cooper Roberts — Super Rugby player, Crusaders

=== Other ===
- Sir Gordon Bell (1887–1970) — surgeon
- Eileen Duggan (1894–1972) — poet and journalist
- Tom Murray (born 1994) — Olympic rower

== Notable staff ==
- Sydney Jones (1894–1982) – National MP for Hastings (1949–1954)
- William Sheat (1899–1982) – National MP for Taranaki electorates (1926–1928)
