= Crusaders (rugby union) =

Super Rugby franchise based in Christchurch, New Zealand

- Union: New Zealand Rugby Union
- Founded: 1996; 30 years ago
- Location: Christchurch, New Zealand
- Region: Buller; Canterbury; Mid-Canterbury; South Canterbury; Tasman; West Coast
- Ground(s): Apollo Projects Stadium (Capacity: 18,600); One New Zealand Stadium (Capacity: 30,000)
- Coach: Scott Hansen
- Captain: TBA
- Most caps: Wyatt Crockett (202)
- Top scorer: Dan Carter (1,708)
- Most tries: Sevu Reece (66)
- League: Super Rugby Pacific
- 2026: 3rd overall Playoffs: Semi-finalist
| 1st kit | 2nd kit |

Official website
- crusaders.co.nz

The Crusaders (Māori: Whatumoana; formerly Canterbury Crusaders) are a New Zealand professional rugby union team based in Christchurch, who compete in the Super Rugby competition. They are the most successful team in the competition's history and have won a total of 13 titles (1998, 1999, 2000, 2002, 2005, 2006, 2008, 2017, 2018, 2019, 2022, 2023 and 2025) as well as two regionalised Super Rugby titles in 2020 and 2021.

Formed in 1996 to represent the upper South Island of New Zealand in the Super 12, the Crusaders represent the Buller, Canterbury, Mid-Canterbury, South Canterbury, Tasman and West Coast provincial Rugby Unions. Their main home ground since 2012 is Rugby League Park (known for sponsorship reasons as Apollo Projects Stadium). They formerly played out of Jade Stadium prior to it being damaged beyond repair in the 2011 Christchurch earthquake.

The Crusaders struggled in the first season of the Super 12, 1996, finishing last. Their performance improved in 1997 and the team finished sixth (out of twelve teams). The team went on to win three titles from 1998 to 2000 despite each final being played away from home. They again won the competition in 2002 after going through the season unbeaten. In the following two seasons, they again reached the final, although they were beaten on both occasions. In 2005, it was the last season of the Super 12 before its expansion. After finishing top of the table in that season, the Crusaders went on to host the final in which they defeated the Waratahs (35–25). As a result of winning their fifth Super 12 title, the Crusaders were given the trophy to keep. In 2006, the Crusaders hosted the Hurricanes in the inaugural Super 14 final and won (19–12). In 2008, the Crusaders hosted the final at AMI Stadium against the Waratahs, and won the match (20–12) to claim their seventh title. Their eighth championship came in the 2017 final when they defeated the Lions (25–17) in Johannesburg. The Crusaders hosted the Lions in the 2018 final and won (37–18), securing their ninth title. The Crusaders won their tenth Super Rugby title at home against the Jaguares (19–3) in the 2019 final. The Crusaders won their 11th and 12th title in both editions of Super Rugby Aotearoa in 2020 and 2021. They won their 11th full title (13th overall) by winning the inaugural Super Rugby Pacific final in 2022 against the Blues (21–7) at Eden Park in Auckland. The Crusaders won their 12th full Super Rugby title (14th overall) after beating the Chiefs (25–20) in the 2023 final in Hamilton. The Crusaders won their 13th full title (15th overall) after beating the Chiefs (16–12) in the 2025 final in Christchurch.

The Crusaders have been led by only three CEOs throughout their 29-year history; former New Zealand Rugby CEO Steve Tew, Hamish Riach and incumbent Colin Mansbridge.

== History ==
=== Beginnings: 1996–1997 ===
The Crusaders franchise was created as one of five New Zealand teams in the Super 12. Originally named the Canterbury Crusaders, the Crusaders' franchise area encompassed the upper South Island of New Zealand (see Super Rugby franchise areas), and was formed from the Buller, Canterbury, Marlborough, Mid-Canterbury, Nelson Bays, South Canterbury, and West Coast rugby unions. (Note: The Marlborough and Nelson Bays unions have since amalgamated to form the Tasman Rugby Union.) The original Crusaders team of 1996 was captained by All Blacks prop Richard Loe and coached by Vance Stewart. The Crusaders struggled in the inaugural season and finished bottom of the table with only two wins. Their eight losses included a 49–18 loss to the Blues and a 52–16 loss to the Queensland Reds. And the First ever tour was a pre-visit to South Africa prior start of Super 12.

The following season saw a change in captain and coach, with Todd Blackadder succeeding Loe as captain and Wayne Smith taking over as coach. With five wins, the team finished the round-robin stage in sixth place. The improvement was particularly illustrated by the Crusaders' 29–28 loss to the defending champions, the Blues, which contrasted with their 49–18 loss the previous season. (The Blues also went on to win the 1997 title). During this loss, Leon MacDonald was taken out with a shoulder charge by Robin Brooke. While the Crusaders attempted to get MacDonald back on the field, the Blues scored two tries, including one by Brooke, who was later suspended for two weeks for the shoulder charge. In their last game of 1997, the Crusaders beat the Queensland Reds 48–3 at Lancaster Park.

=== Hat trick: 1998–2000 ===
The Crusaders won their first title in 1998, despite starting the season with three losses in their first four games. They finished the round-robin by winning their last seven games, culminating in a last-round win over the Coastal Sharks (now the Sharks) that gave them second place in the round-robin phase of the competition. Their second-placing allowed them to host their semi-final at Lancaster Park, where they won the match 36–32 against the Coastal Sharks.

In the final at Eden Park, the Crusaders faced the Blues, who were heavy favourites. According to Crusaders' hooker Mark Hammett, "If we'd been polled in that week, and had to give an honest answer, most of the boys, deep down, would probably have thought that the Blues would beat us." The Crusaders were ahead 3–0 at half time, but the Blues scored first after half time to take a 10–3 lead after 53 minutes. After Crusader Norm Maxwell scored a try, the game was tied 10 all. Then, after a penalty each, the two teams were tied 13 all with one minute of regulation time remaining. At that moment, Andrew Mehrtens chipped the ball for James Kerr to run onto and score, giving the Crusaders a 20–13 win after the try was converted. The ten points scored by Andrew Mehrtens in the final contributed to his total of 206 points for the season − a record for the Super 12. Upon the Crusaders' return to Christchurch, they were given a parade through the city that drew 100,000 people.

We're a regional selection... and it's important to remember that, besides Canterbury, we also represent Nelson Bays, Marlborough, Buller, West Coast, Mid-Canterbury and South Canterbury

— Todd Blackadder, Crusaders captain, 1998 Super 12 victory speech

The 1999 season was equally successful for the Crusaders despite struggling to make the play-offs in fourth place after winning their last four round-robin matches. They defeated the favoured Queensland Reds (who had finished top in the round-robin) in their semi-final to advance to the final against the Otago Highlanders (since renamed the Highlanders). The all-South Island final in Dunedin was promoted as "the party at Tony Brown's house" after Highlanders first five-eighths Tony Brown. Again playing away from home, the Crusaders won 24–19. The decisive try of the match was scored by Crusaders winger Afato So'oalo when he chipped the ball, then out-sprinted All Blacks winger Jeff Wilson to collect the ball and score.

Following the All Blacks' semi-final loss in the 1999 Rugby World Cup, Wayne Smith succeeded John Hart as All Blacks coach. Crusaders manager Robbie Deans replaced Smith as Crusaders coach. In Deans' first year in charge, the Crusaders won their third title in a row − a feat that would be repeated in the 2017-2018-2019 seasons. The Crusaders finished second in the round-robin, earning them the right to host a semi-final in which they faced the Highlanders at Jade Stadium. Two tries in the final 20 minutes by Marika Vunibaka helped the Crusaders to a 37–15 win. The 2000 Super 12 Final was played against the Brumbies in Canberra, Australia, where the weather for the final was icy, with sleet and snow. The game was low-scoring, with only one try each. Four penalties by Mehrtens gave the Crusaders a 12–6 half time lead. Following a Brumbies penalty four minutes from time, the Brumbies led 19–17. However, the Crusaders were awarded a penalty from the resulting kick-off, and after Mehrtens converted the penalty, the Crusaders went on to win the game 20–19.

=== Development of a legacy: 2001–2005 ===
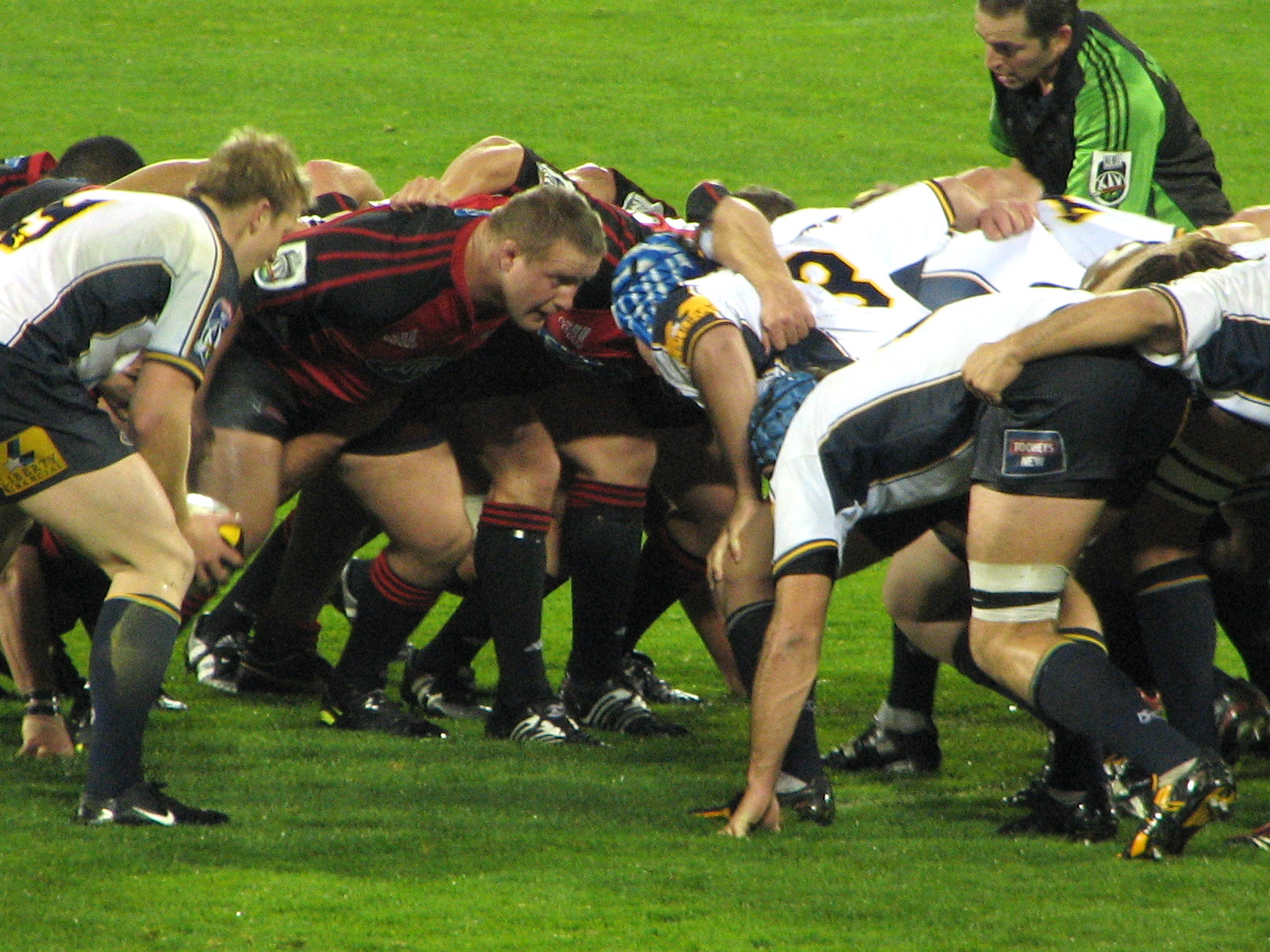
Crusaders scrum against the Brumbies in May 2006

After winning three consecutive Super 12 titles, the Crusaders finished tenth in 2001 – their worst finish since 1996. The season was the last for captain Todd Blackadder before he left to play for Edinburgh in Scotland. (Note: Before leaving for Scotland, Blackadder led the Canterbury NPC team to victory in the 2001 National Provincial Championship.)

The Crusaders bounced back dramatically in 2002 when they went through the Super 12 season unbeaten, achieving their fourth title. Although the Crusaders won all eleven of their round-robin matches, six of them were won by a margin of seven points or less. (Note: Seven points is significant because it is the value of a converted try.) Their eleven round-robin games also included a record 96–19 win over the Waratahs in the final match of the round-robin stage, which was especially noteworthy given that both teams finished at the top of the table.

The Crusaders met the Highlanders in their 2002 semi-final, which they eventually won 34–23 after being ahead 18–6 at half time. The following week, they faced the Brumbies in the first final to be hosted at Jade Stadium. The Brumbies trailed 11–3 after the first half, having had only 30 per cent possession. Although the Brumbies closed the gap to 14–13 with eight minutes to go, the Crusaders held on and steadied to win 31–13 with a last-minute try to Caleb Ralph. The season was their first under the captaincy of Reuben Thorne, who went on to captain the All Blacks until the end of the 2003 Rugby World Cup.

The Crusaders' winning run finally came to an end when they were beaten 39–5 by the Blues in the third round of the 2003 Super 12 season. Although their 15-match unbeaten streak had ended, Richie McCaw said of the loss, "...in some ways it was almost a relief. We'd finally been beaten, the run was over, so people could stop talking about it and we could get on with playing it week by week." The Crusaders recovered to finish second on the table with eight wins. They hosted a semi-final against the Hurricanes, who were coached by Colin Cooper, a former assistant coach for the Crusaders. Despite this inside knowledge of the team by the Wellington coach, the Crusaders won the match 39–16. In the final, the Crusaders met the Blues, another team coached by a former Crusaders assistant coach, Peter Sloane. Hooker Mark Hammett scored two tries to give the Crusaders a 10–6 lead at half-time. The Blues hit back to lead 21–10 with ten minutes to go. The Crusaders managed another converted try, but it was not enough, and the Blues won 21–17.

The Crusaders' 2004 season began with two losses: first to the Waratahs, then to the Blues. They recovered to again finish second on the table with seven wins. They played the Stormers at Jade Stadium in their semi-final, and won 27–16. They met the Brumbies at Canberra Stadium in a replay of the 2000 final. The Brumbies dominated in the final, scoring 33 unanswered points in the first 19 minutes. The Crusaders managed to salvage some pride by narrowing the loss to a 47–38 finish.

The 2005 season started with a repeat of the previous year's final: a Brumbies victory over the Crusaders in Canberra. There was a win the following week at home over the Chiefs, followed by a win over the Reds at Trafalgar Park. Although there was a 35–20 loss to the Bulls after Crusaders captain Richie McCaw was knocked unconscious, they eventually finished the regular season top of the table. McCaw returned from his five weeks on the sideline to lead the Crusaders in their semi-final victory over the Hurricanes. They faced the Waratahs in the final at Jade Stadium. Leading 14–6 at halftime, the Crusaders then moved out to a 29-point lead. Despite three late tries by the Waratahs, the Crusaders won their fifth title with a 35–20 win.

As a reward for their seventh finals appearance and fifth title, the Crusaders were allowed to keep the Super 12 trophy. After the 2005 season, the franchise saw the departure of stalwarts Andrew Mehrtens and Justin Marshall, both of whom had played for the team since its formation in 1996.

=== Super 14: 2006–2010 ===
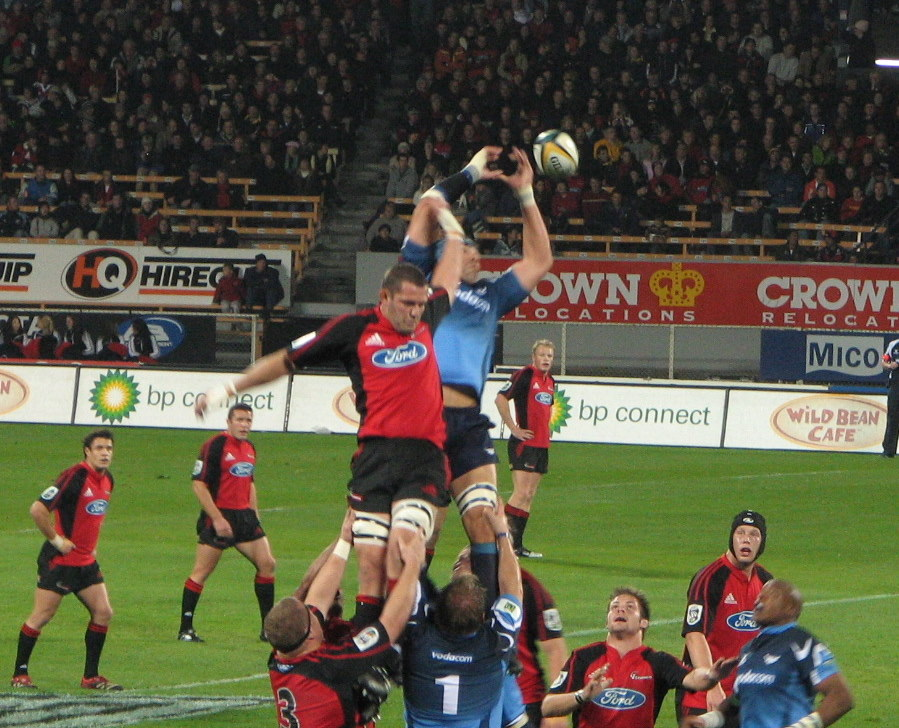
The Crusaders playing the Bulls in 2006.

In 2006, the Super 12 expanded to form the Super 14 when the Western Force from Perth, Australia, and the Cheetahs from the Free State and Northern Cape Provinces, South Africa joined the competition. An unbeaten run of sixteen matches was nearly halted when the Crusaders drew with the Western Force in Perth in round eleven. The following week, the unbeaten run was ended when the Crusaders lost to the Stormers in Cape Town. That loss was their only one of the year, as they finished top of the table with eleven wins. After beating the Bulls in their semi-final, the Crusaders faced the Hurricanes in the final at Jade Stadium that was played in a thick fog, causing poor visibility. Sections of the crowd could not see the field, and many spectators left during the match. The scorers were tied 9–9 going into the game's last 20 minutes. The Crusaders' Casey Laulala then scored the game's only try before the match finished 19–12.

In the 2007 Super 14 season, seven Crusaders players missed the first seven rounds of the competition to participate in an All Black "conditioning programme". The conditioning programme was part of the All Blacks' 2007 Rugby World Cup preparations; 22 players were selected for the programme. The Crusaders' seven players in the programme was more than any other New Zealand Super 14 franchise. The Crusaders players were Chris Jack, Richie McCaw, Greg Somerville, Reuben Thorne, Dan Carter, Leon MacDonald, and Aaron Mauger. All but one of the seven returned to play for the Crusaders in their eighth round match against the Stormers (Greg Somerville did not return due to injury). The Crusaders climbed to second on the table before defeating the Western Force 53–0 at Jade Stadium in the tenth round. The victory over the Force was the one hundredth Super rugby win for the Crusaders – the first franchise to reach the milestone. (Note: It was also the Crusaders' first victory over the Force – they drew in 2006.)

The Crusaders were top of the table going into the last round of the Super 14 before the play-offs. To guarantee a home semi-final they needed to defeat the Chiefs at Jade Stadium. The Chiefs won 30–24 – and ended the Crusaders 26 game winning streak at home. As the Bulls defeated the Reds 92–3 in the same round, they overtook the Crusaders to finish second in the round robin. The Crusaders then travelled to Pretoria to face the Bulls in their semi-final where they lost 27–12.

The 2008 season was another highly successful one for the Crusaders. After finishing top of the table at the end of the last round, they comfortably defeated the Hurricanes 33–22 in the semi-final, and went on to beat the Waratahs in the final 20–12. It was a fitting way to send off long-serving coach Robbie Deans before he departed to coach Australia. It was also the last game for Crusaders stalwarts Caleb Ralph and former captain Reuben Thorne. In July that year former captain Todd Blackadder was appointed Crusaders coach, and his former teammates Mark Hammett and Daryl Gibson were appointed as assistants.

The 2009 season started with a sole win and a draw from the Crusaders' first five matches; this included a 6–0 loss to the Highlanders. The side found its feet later in the season, and won key away games which ultimately saw them finish in fourth place on the table – just ahead of the Waratahs. Both the Crusaders and Waratahs finished the season with 41 competition points, but the Crusaders advanced through to the semi-finals due to a greater 'points for and against' difference.

The Crusaders lost their semi-final to the Bulls 36–23 at Loftus Versfeld, Pretoria in front of a capacity 52,000 crowd. The Bulls went on to win the 2009 Super 14 title beating the Chiefs 61–17. Statistically, the Crusaders had the best defensive record of the 2009 competition – conceding just 198 points. However, points for, and total tries scored was the second lowest in the competition with just 231 points and 27 tries.

In 2010 the Crusaders had a very good start to the season before a poor finish with three losses in four games caused them to have to travel to Orlando Stadium, Soweto to face the Bulls. They lost the semi-final 39–24.

=== 2011–2016 ===
The 2011 season had a minor hiccup at the very beginning with a two-point loss to the Blues. Their second round match against the Hurricanes was cancelled, and match declared a draw after the Christchurch earthquake on 22 February which caused 182 deaths. In their first match after the earthquake they played the Waratahs, a team that had only conceded six points in their previous two games. The Crusaders triumphed 33–18 in a convincing display in front of a sold-out stadium. They next played the Brumbies and brushed them aside in a 52–10 demolition. They next played the Highlanders who had previously only lost one match in the season, to the undefeated and table-topping Stormers. The Crusaders won comfortably 44–13 in Dunedin. The next team they played, the Sharks, had like the Highlanders previously only lost one match in the season before the Crusaders won 44–28 at Twickenham for a one-off match due to earthquake damage at their own ground. They played the second match in a sell-out crowd at Fraser Park in Timaru against the Bulls winning 27–0. Round 9 they played the Chiefs in Mt Maunganui and gained four tries winning 34–16 with Richie McCaw returning after eight weeks off with injury.Towards the end of the round-robin phase, The Crusaders were vying with the Queensland Reds for top spot in the table and with it home advantage throughout the playoffs. In the crucial deciding match v the Queensland Reds in Brisbane, the Crusaders had a narrow lead going into the final minute when the Australian referee awarded the Reds a highly controversial penalty and match-winning opportunity. This was duly converted, handing the Reds the aforementioned home-field playoff advantage. The Crusaders lost the final at the Suncorp Stadium to the Queensland Reds. Will Genia scored a crucial try for the Reds to help them to an 18–13 win.

The 2012 season, the first in the new home ground of Christchurch Stadium, saw the Crusaders again reach the playoffs. However, they were defeated by the (eventual champion) Chiefs in the semi-final.

=== 2017–2023 ===
In 2017, Scott Robertson took over as head coach. The Crusaders lost 3–12 to the British & Irish Lions in Christchurch, during the Lions tour to New Zealand.

The team went on to win their 8th Super Rugby title, defeating the Lions (25–17) in the final on 5 August 2017 at Ellis Park Stadium in Johannesburg.

In 2018, the Crusaders played the Lions again in the final. This time they won (37–18) at home to capture their ninth title.

In 2019, they defeated the Jaguares from Argentina (19–3) at home to win their 3rd consecutive Super Rugby title, and 10th championship overall.

After 7 rounds of the 2020 Super Rugby season, the Crusaders were leading the NZ conference and were in 3rd overall (behind the Sharks and Brumbies) but the COVID-19 pandemic stopped the competition after the 7th round. However, in June 2020 a domestic Super Rugby competition started called Super Rugby Aotearoa. The Crusaders won the overall title in Super Rugby Aotearoa 2020, winning 7 out of 8 games. Their 36-game win streak at Orangetheory Stadium was broken however by the Hurricanes in Round 7, who defeated them (32–34). The Crusaders dropped the physical trophy in post-match celebrations, chipping the pounamu mere that was on it.

The Crusaders returned to Super Rugby Aotearoa in 2021. Despite losses to the Highlanders (12–33) and the Chiefs (25–26), they went on to beat the Chiefs in the final and win their 5th consecutive title in a (24–13) victory. Following that, they went into the Super Rugby Trans Tasman competition and beat the Brumbies (31–29), Reds (63–28), Waratahs (54–28), Force (29–21) and Rebels (52–26) but came up just short on points difference needed to be able to make the final.

In 2022 and 2023, the Crusaders won their 11th and 12th full Super Rugby title (14th Overall) in the newly formed Super Rugby Pacific competition by beating the Blues (21–7) and the Chiefs (25–20). At the end of the 2023 Grand Final, the Scott Robertson dynasty was complete and it marked the end of an era for Crusader #26 as a former player and as head coach.

=== 2024– ===
In June 2023, Rob Penney was announced as the Crusaders Head Coach for 2024 and 2025. After winning 7 consecutive titles, the Crusaders slumped to a 4 win and 10 loss season in 2024 and missed the playoffs for the first time since 2015. After a thorough review of an abysmal 2024 season, the Crusaders decided to keep Penney as Head Coach for 2025 and will finish out the remainder of his 2-year contract with the team. In 2025, the Crusaders had a resurgence year. They finished the regular season in 2nd place by winning 11 from 14 games and finished within the top 6. After missing the playoffs in the previous year, the Crusaders qualified and went on to host the Reds in the qualifying final at home and defeated them (32–12) in a dominant victory. They advanced to the semi-final and hosted the defending champions the Blues after they beat the top seeded Chiefs in their qualifying final game in Hamilton. With the Chiefs losing, the Crusaders jumped into the number one seed spot. They defeated the Blues (21–14) after defending for over 40 phases and holding out the reigning champs to advance to the final. The Crusaders hosted the Chiefs in the Final and defeated them (16–12) to win their 13th full title (15th overall) in Christchurch.

== Name and colours ==
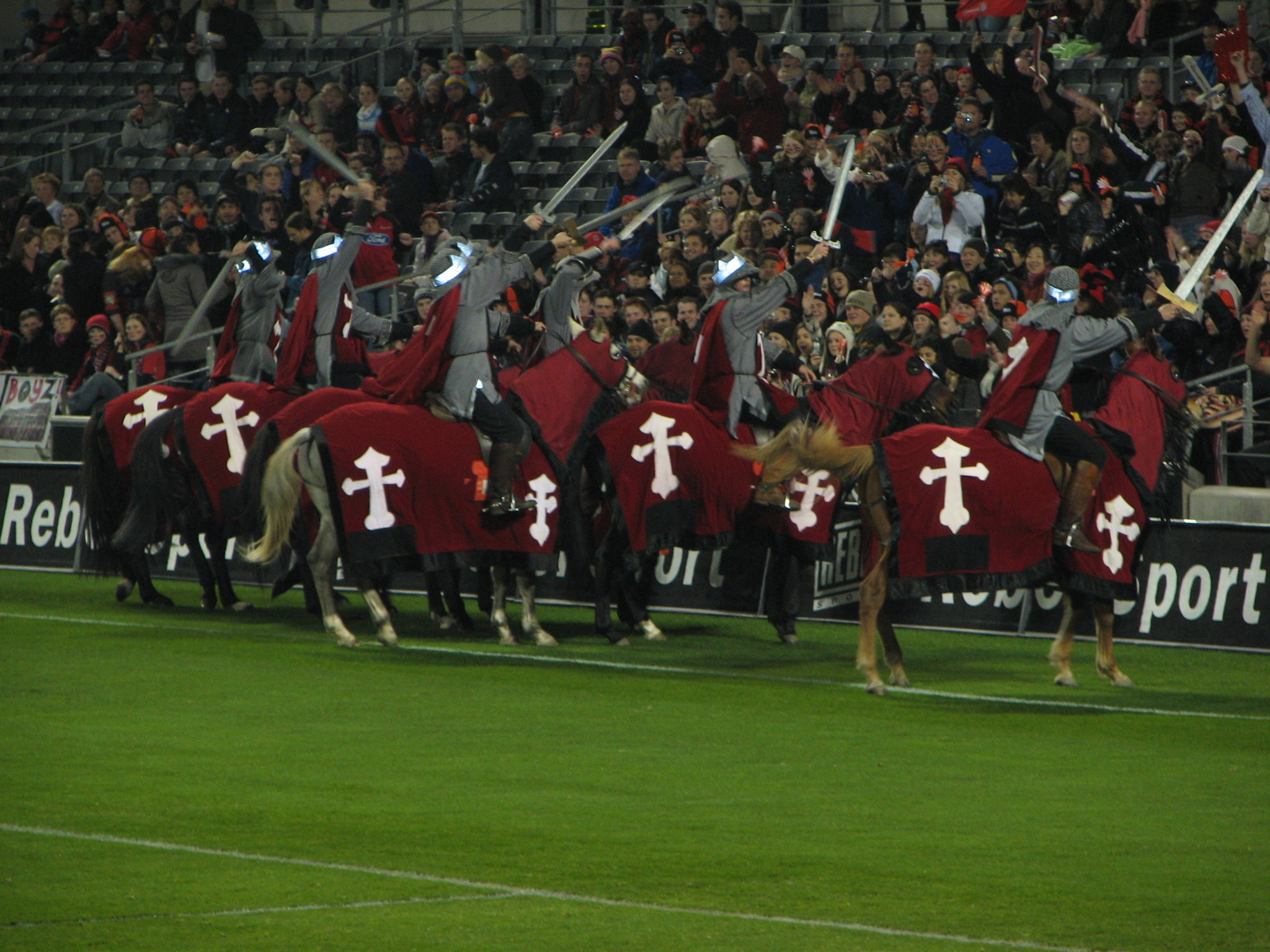
The Horsemen performing to the crowd before a match

According to the club, the Crusaders name was chosen to reflect the "crusading nature of Canterbury rugby". A potential name was also the Plainsmen; however, this was not chosen, as "Crusaders" recalled the English heritage of the city of Christchurch.

The club adopted Canterbury's traditional sporting colours of red and black, as worn by Canterbury.

In the aftermath of the 15 March 2019 Christchurch mosque shootings at Al Noor Mosque and Linwood Islamic Centre in Christchurch, New Zealand which killed 51 people and injured 50 more, the Crusaders considered the idea changing the team name because the symbolism and imagery was considered to be "offensive to some in the community due to its association with the religious Crusades between Christians and Muslims" according to New Zealand Rugby Executive Steve Tew but ultimately though it was kept and remained unchanged for the 2020 season. The Crusaders management led by Colin Mansbridge, revealed a new logo to replace the knight and sword in late 2019.

== Franchise area ==
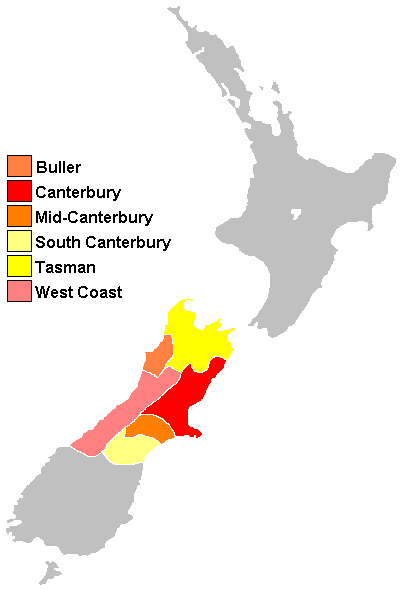

The Crusaders franchise area consists of the regions controlled by the Buller, Canterbury, Mid-Canterbury, South Canterbury, Tasman and West Coast rugby unions. Before 2006, when the NPC was reorganised, Canterbury was the only union playing division one (now Bunnings NPC) within the Crusaders catchment. As a result, the majority of Crusaders players were also listed with Canterbury. Today, the Crusaders catchment contains two Bunnings NPC sides – Canterbury and Tasman.

== Grounds ==
The Crusaders' main home ground was the 36,000-capacity AMI Stadium in Christchurch. However, they stopped playing there during the 2011 Super Rugby season due to damage inflicted by the February Christchurch earthquake. The Crusaders usually took one game each year to another part of the franchise area, most often when the New Zealand cricket team was playing at AMI Stadium. Previous venues included Trafalgar Park in Nelson, and Fraser Park in Timaru.

With AMI Stadium still out of commission, the Crusaders adopted Rugby League Park (which has been renamed Christchurch Stadium temporarily) in Addington as their home ground for that and future seasons to recentralise their games in one location as opposed to the road show that was the 2011 season. The ground had a limited makeover, taking it to an 18,600 capacity stadium and bringing its facilities to the minimum standards required by the Super Rugby competition.

The Crusaders' management proposed playing a 2005 regular season match in Melbourne when Jade Stadium was unavailable. Although five of the seven unions within the Crusaders region (Note: The Marlborough and Nelson Bays rugby unions had not yet merged.) supported having the regular season game in Melbourne, the New Zealand Rugby Union (NZRU) vetoed the proposal. In 2006, the Crusaders did play a pre-season match in Melbourne against the Western Force at Olympic Park Stadium. They did the same in the 2008 preseason as well, also against the Force.

Due to the 2011 earthquake, the Crusaders played four games at Trafalgar Park, and two in Timaru during their 2011 season. They also played a "home" game in Wellington in Round 18 against Hurricanes, and a special home match against the Sharks at Twickenham in London. The London match was a fundraiser for earthquake relief, and was the first Super Rugby match ever contested outside of the three participating countries. In the first 30 hours of ticket sales, over 30,000 were purchased; a spokesman for United Ticketmaster indicated that the response was the strongest he had experienced for a rugby match outside of internationals.

In January 2023, construction began on Te Kaha Stadium as a new facility for the city which can also be used as a home ground for the Crusaders. The stadium will seat 30,000 spectators, and will feature a fixed roof, becoming the second fully-covered stadium in New Zealand after Forsyth Barr Stadium in Dunedin. The current planned date for opening is April 2026.

| Nelson | Christchurch | Timaru |
|---|---|---|
| Trafalgar Park | One New Zealand Stadium | Fraser Park |
| Capacity: 18,000 | Capacity: 30,000 | Capacity: 12,500 |
| | Interior_of_Te_Kaha_Stadium | |

== Development programmes ==
The Crusaders currently use their Academy to develop their players for the future and have had many players who have graduated from their academy and who have come through their system go on to play in Super Rugby and for the All Blacks. They use the Development XV (Crusaders Knights), Junior Crusaders (U18) and the Crusaders (U20) as a pathway to provide future players the opportunity to be able to play professional rugby. They also have an International Academy Players Programme that primarily focuses on selecting young, up and coming players from around the globe and provides them with the opportunity to travel to Christchurch, New Zealand, to learn and gain more experience about rugby in the Crusaders environment.

== Honours ==
=== Super Rugby (1996–Present) ===
- Champions (13)

1998, 1999, 2000, 2002, 2005, 2006, 2008, 2017, 2018, 2019, 2022, 2023, 2025

- Runners-up (4)

2003, 2004, 2011, 2014

- Super Rugby Aotearoa Champions (2)

2020, 2021

- Playoff Appearances (24)

1998, 1999, 2000, 2002, 2003, 2004, 2005, 2006, 2007, 2008, 2009, 2010, 2011, 2012, 2013, 2014, 2016, 2017, 2018, 2019, 2021, 2022, 2023, 2025, 2026

- New Zealand/Australasian Conference Champions (5)

2011, 2014, 2017, 2018, 2019

== Records and achievements ==
=== Season standings ===
A season-by-season summary of the Crusaders regular season results is shown below:

| Super 12 | Super 14 | Super Rugby | Super Rugby Aotearoa | Super Rugby Trans Tasman | Super Rugby Pacific |

| Season | Pos | Pld | W | L | D | F | A | +/- | BP | Pts | Notes |
|---|---|---|---|---|---|---|---|---|---|---|---|
| 1996 | 12th | 11 | 2 | 8 | 1 | 234 | 378 | –144 | 3 | 13 | DNQ For Playoffs |
| 1997 | 6th | 11 | 5 | 5 | 1 | 272 | 235 | +37 | 4 | 26 | DNQ For Playoffs |
| 1998 | 2nd | 11 | 8 | 3 | 0 | 340 | 260 | +80 | 9 | 41 | Defeated Blues in final |
| 1999 | 4th | 11 | 7 | 3 | 1 | 324 | 262 | +62 | 3 | 33 | Defeated Highlanders in final |
| 2000 | 2nd | 11 | 8 | 3 | 0 | 369 | 293 | +76 | 7 | 39 | Defeated Brumbies in final |
| 2001 | 10th | 11 | 4 | 7 | 0 | 307 | 331 | −24 | 7 | 23 | DNQ For Playoffs |
| 2002 | 1st | 11 | 11 | 0 | 0 | 469 | 264 | +205 | 7 | 51 | Defeated Brumbies in final |
| 2003 | 2nd | 11 | 8 | 3 | 0 | 358 | 263 | +95 | 8 | 40 | Lost to Blues in final |
| 2004 | 2nd | 11 | 7 | 4 | 0 | 345 | 303 | +42 | 6 | 34 | Lost to Brumbies in final |
| 2005 | 1st | 11 | 9 | 2 | 0 | 459 | 281 | +178 | 8 | 44 | Defeated Waratahs in final |
| 2006 | 1st | 13 | 11 | 1 | 1 | 412 | 210 | +202 | 5 | 51 | Defeated Hurricanes in final |
| 2007 | 3rd | 13 | 8 | 5 | 0 | 382 | 235 | +147 | 10 | 42 | Lost to Bulls in semi-final |
| 2008 | 1st | 13 | 11 | 2 | 0 | 369 | 176 | +193 | 8 | 42 | Defeated Waratahs in final |
| 2009 | 4th | 13 | 8 | 4 | 1 | 231 | 198 | +33 | 7 | 41 | Lost to Bulls in semi-final |
| 2010 | 4th | 13 | 8 | 4 | 1 | 388 | 295 | +93 | 7 | 41 | Lost to Bulls in semi-final |
| 2011 | 3rd | 16 | 11 | 4 | 1 | 436 | 273 | +163 | 7 | 61* | Lost to Reds in final^{1} |
| 2012 | 4th | 16 | 11 | 5 | 0 | 485 | 273 | +142 | 9 | 61* | Lost to Chiefs in semi-final^{1} |
| 2013 | 4th | 16 | 11 | 5 | 0 | 446 | 307 | +139 | 8 | 60* | Lost to Chiefs in semi-final^{1} |
| 2014 | 2nd | 16 | 11 | 5 | 0 | 445 | 322 | +123 | 7 | 51 | Lost to Waratahs in final |
| 2015 | 7th | 16 | 9 | 7 | 0 | 481 | 338 | +143 | 10 | 46 | DNQ For Playoffs |
| 2016 | 7th | 15 | 11 | 4 | 0 | 487 | 317 | +170 | 6 | 50 | Lost to Lions in quarter-final |
| 2017 | 2nd | 15 | 14 | 1 | 0 | 544 | 303 | +241 | 7 | 63 | Defeated Lions in final |
| 2018 | 1st | 16 | 14 | 2 | 0 | 542 | 295 | +247 | 7 | 63 | Defeated Lions in final |
| 2019 | 1st | 16 | 11 | 2 | 3 | 497 | 257 | +240 | 8 | 58 | Defeated Jaguares in final |
| 2020 | 3rd | 6 | 5 | 1 | 0 | 189 | 105 | +84 | 3 | 23 | Season cancelled due to COVID-19^{2} |
| 2020 | 1st | 8 | 6 | 1 | 1* | 219 | 148 | +71 | 4 | 30 | No playoffs, round robin only^{3} |
| 2021 | 1st | 8 | 6 | 2 | 0 | 237 | 165 | +72 | 4 | 28 | Defeated Chiefs in final^{4} |
| 2021 | 3rd | 5 | 5 | 0 | 0 | 229 | 132 | +97 | 3 | 23 | Round robin with final^{5} |
| 2022 | 2nd | 14 | 11 | 3 | 0 | 470 | 268 | +202 | 8 | 52 | Defeated Blues in final |
| 2023 | 2nd | 14 | 10 | 4 | 0 | 457 | 278 | +179 | 8 | 48 | Defeated Chiefs in final |
| 2024 | 9th | 14 | 4 | 10 | 0 | 363 | 369 | –6 | 8 | 24 | DNQ For Playoffs |
| 2025 | 2nd | 14 | 11 | 3 | 0 | 471 | 371 | +100 | 5 | 49 | Defeated Chiefs in final |

==== Notes ====
^1 Teams were awarded four points for a bye during the Super Rugby seasons from 2011 to 2013. Each team took two bye rounds each season. These additional 8 points are included in their season points tally.
^2 All matches after Round 7 were cancelled. the season remained incomplete and no champion was awarded.
^3 Super Rugby Aotearoa was announced as a stand-in replacement competition for Super Rugby, between New Zealand Super Rugby sides. It was played as a round robin competition, with no finals. All teams played the other four teams twice, with the title awarded to the highest ranked team at the conclusion of the round robin fixtures. The final round match between the Crusaders and Blues was cancelled due to COVID-19 restrictions, with each team receiving 2 competition points.
^4 Super Rugby Aotearoa adopted the same format in 2021 as the inaugural tournament in 2020, with the addition of a final between the top two ranked teams at the conclusion of the round robin stage.
^5 Super Rugby Trans Tasman was a crossover competition between the teams involved in Super Rugby Aotearoa and Super Rugby AU. Each team from Super Rugby AU played each team from Super Rugby Aotearoa once, and vice versa. A final was played between the top two seeded teams at the conclusion of the round robin matches.

=== Results per opposition ===
Crusaders Super Rugby record vs all opponents

Super Rugby
| Opposition | Span | Played | Won | Lost | Drawn | Win% |
|---|---|---|---|---|---|---|
| (New Zealand) Blues | 1996–2025 | 52 | 37 | 14 | 1 | 71% |
| (New Zealand) Chiefs | 1996–2025 | 55 | 32 | 23 | 0 | 58% |
| (New Zealand) Highlanders | 1996–2025 | 50 | 36 | 13 | 1 | 72% |
| (New Zealand) Hurricanes | 1996–2025 | 50 | 31 | 16 | 3 | 62% |
| (Australia) Brumbies | 1996–2025 | 32 | 22 | 10 | 0 | 69% |
| (Australia) Force | 2006–2025 | 17 | 11 | 4 | 2 | 65% |
| (Australia) Rebels | 2012–2024 | 12 | 10 | 2 | 0 | 83% |
| (Australia) Reds | 1996–2025 | 34 | 26 | 8 | 0 | 76% |
| (Australia) Waratahs | 1996–2025 | 34 | 24 | 10 | 0 | 71% |
| (South Africa) Bulls | 1996–2019 | 27 | 17 | 10 | 0 | 63% |
| (South Africa) Cheetahs | 1997–2017 | 11 | 9 | 2 | 0 | 82% |
| (South Africa) Lions | 1996–2018 | 24 | 19 | 5 | 0 | 79% |
| (South Africa) Sharks | 1996–2019 | 25 | 18 | 5 | 2 | 72% |
| (South Africa) Southern Kings | 2013–2016 | 2 | 2 | 0 | 0 | 100% |
| (South Africa) Stormers | 1996–2019 | 23 | 17 | 4 | 2 | 74% |
| (Argentina) Jaguares | 2016–2019 | 3 | 3 | 0 | 0 | 100% |
| (Japan) Sunwolves | 2017–2020 | 3 | 3 | 0 | 0 | 100% |
| (Fiji) Fijian Drua | 2022–2025 | 6 | 4 | 2 | 0 | 67% |
| (Samoa) (Tonga) Moana Pasifika | 2022–2025 | 6 | 5 | 1 | 0 | 83% |
| Overall | 1996–2025 | 466 | 326 | 130 | 11 | 70% |
Updated to: 13 June 2026

=== Individual records ===
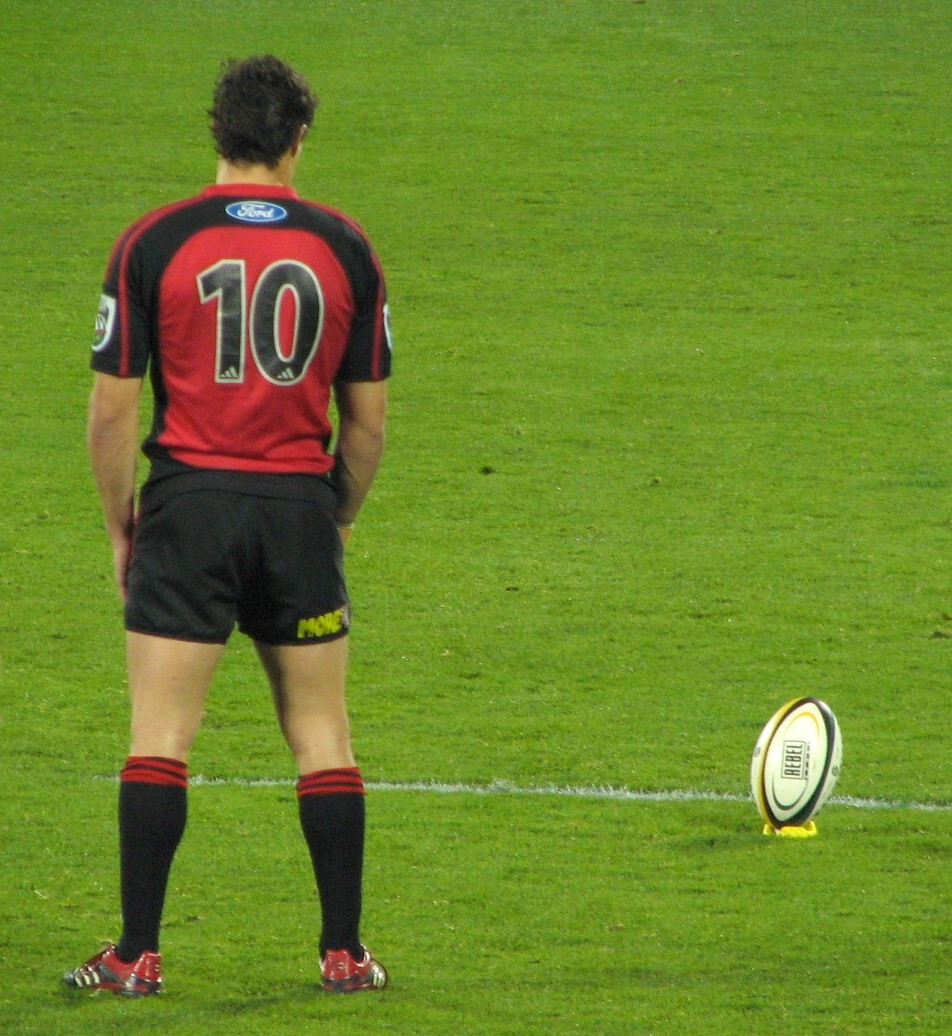
Record points scorer Dan Carter preparing to kick a conversion.

- Most Points in a career: 1,708 (Dan Carter)
- Most Points in a season: 221 (Dan Carter, 2006)
- Most Points in a match: 31 (Tom Taylor, v Stormers, 2012)
- Most Tries in a career: 66 (Sevu Reece)
- Most Tries in a season: 15 (Rico Gear, 2005)
- Most Tries in a match: 5 (Macca Springer, v Force, 2025)
- Most Conversions in a career: 287 (Dan Carter)
- Most Conversions in a season: 57 (Richie Moʻunga, 2023)
- Most Conversions in a match: 13 (Andrew Mehrtens, v NSW Waratahs, 2002)
- Most Penalty goals in a career: 307 (Dan Carter)
- Most Penalty goals in a season: 46 (Colin Slade, 2014)
- Most Penalty goals in a match: 8 (Tom Taylor, v Stormers, 2012)
- Most Dropped goals in a career: 17 (Andrew Mehrtens)
- Most Dropped goals in a season: 4 (Andrew Mehrtens, 1998, 1999, 2002)
- Most Dropped goals in a match: 3 (Andrew Mehrtens, v Highlanders, 1998)
- Most Appearances: 202 (Wyatt Crockett)

=== Team Records ===
- Highest Regular Season Placing: 1st (2002, 2005, 2006, 2008, 2018, 2019)
- Most Wins in a Season: 17 (2017)
- Most Points in a Season: 677 (2018)
- Most Tries in a Season: 94 (2018)
- Fewest Wins in a Season: 2 (1996)
- Fewest Points in a Season: 231 (2009)
- Fewest Tries in a Season: 24 (1996)
- Biggest Win: 96–19 (77 point win in 2002 vs Waratahs – Christchurch)
- Biggest Loss: 12–49 (37 point loss in 2026 vs Chiefs – Hamilton)
- Most points ever scored in a game: 96 (2002 vs Waratahs – Christchurch)
- Fewest points ever scored in a game: 0 (2009 vs Highlanders – Dunedin)
- Longest Winning Streak: 19 (2018 vs Bulls – 2019 vs Waratahs)
- Longest Unbeaten Streak: 19 (2018 vs Bulls – 2019 vs Waratahs with the Highlanders Game March 2019 abandoned)
- Longest Home Winning Streak: 36 (2017 vs Brumbies – 2020 vs Hurricanes)
- First to 100 Wins: Round 10, 2007 season (Crusaders defeated the Western Force 53–0)
- First to 200 Wins: Round 16, 2016 season (Crusaders defeated the Rebels 85–26)
- First to 300 Wins: Round 10, 2024 season (Crusaders defeated the Rebels 39–0)

=== All Time Records ===
- Games played: 450
- Games won: 316
- Games lost: 123
- Games drawn: 11
- Winning percentage: (70%)
- Home Wins: 186 (83%)
- Away Wins: 120 (58%)
- Points for: 12,318
- Points against: 9,113
- Tries for: 1,634
- Tries conceded: 1,063

Playoffs

- Games played: 50
- Games won: 40
- Games lost: 10
- Games drawn: 0
- Winning percentage: (80%)
- Home Wins: 32 (100%)
- Away Wins: 8 (44%)
- Points for: 1,434
- Points against: 866
- Tries for: 149
- Tries conceded: 92

(Record updated as of 2025 season)

In addition to winning more Super Rugby titles than any other team, the franchise also holds several competition records, including most points in a game and most tries in a game, both achieved in their 96–19 victory over the Waratahs in 2002. The Crusaders also hold the record for the fewest points scored in a game when they were defeated by the Highlanders 6–0 in 2009. They have also scored the most points in a season (677) in 2018 and most tries in a season (94) in 2018.

Individual players also hold records: Andrew Mehrtens for most points in a Super 12 season (206 in 1998), and Rico Gear for most tries in a season (15 in 2005). Twenty Four players have played over 100 games for the franchise: Wyatt Crockett, Samuel Whitelock, Kieran Read, Andy Ellis, Owen Franks, Ryan Crotty, Corey Flynn, Richie McCaw, Dan Carter, Matt Todd, Luke Romano, Mitchell Drummond, Codie Taylor, Rueben Thorne, Caleb Ralph, Leon MacDonald, David Havili, Joe Moody, Greg Somerville, Chris Jack, Scott Barrett, Richie Mo'unga, Justin Marshall, Jordan Taufua. The Crusaders have also had three International Rugby Board Players of the Year: Dan Carter (2005), (2012), (2015), Richie McCaw (2006), (2009), (2010) and Kieran Read (2013).

== Current squad ==
The squad for the 2027 Super Rugby Pacific season is:

2027 Crusaders squad
| **Props**: (New Zealand) **George Bower**; (New Zealand) Finlay Brewis; (New Zealand) Seb Calder; (France) Clément Castets; (New Zealand) **Fletcher Newell**; (New Zealand) Feleti Sae-Taʻufoʻou; (New Zealand) **Tamaiti Williams** (injured); **Hookers**: (New Zealand) **George Bell**; (New Zealand) Manumaua Letiu; (New Zealand) **Codie Taylor**; **Locks**: (New Zealand) **Scott Barrett**; (New Zealand) Tahlor Cahill; (New Zealand) **Jamie Hannah**; (New Zealand) Liam Jack | **Loose forwards**: (New Zealand) **Ethan Blackadder**; (New Zealand) Dominic Gardiner; (New Zealand) Johnny Lee; (New Zealand) **Christian Lio-Willie**; (New Zealand) Oli Mathis; (New Zealand) Finn McLeod; (New Zealand) Xavier Saifoloi; (New Zealand) Xavier Treacy; **Halfbacks (scrum-halves)**: (New Zealand) **Mitchell Drummond**; (New Zealand) **Noah Hotham**; (New Zealand) **Kyle Preston**; **First five-eighths (fly-halves)**: (New Zealand) **Richie Mo'unga**; (New Zealand) Rivez Reihana; (New Zealand) James White | **Midfielders (centres)**: (New Zealand) Toby Bell; (New Zealand) Corey Evans; (New Zealand) **Leicester Faingaʻanuku**; (New Zealand) Cooper Roberts; (New Zealand) Jake Te Hiwi; **Outside backs**: (New Zealand) **Chay Fihaki**; (New Zealand) **Will Jordan**; (New Zealand) Maloni Kunawave; (New Zealand) Kurtis MacDonald; (Wales) **Johnny McNicholl**; (New Zealand) Macca Springer |
**Bold** denotes internationally capped players. denotes an injured player. Source:

=== Wider training group ===
The following players were named in the Crusaders wider training group for the 2027 Super Rugby Pacific season:

- (New Zealand) Gus Brown (Prop)
- (New Zealand) Monu Moli (Prop)
- (New Zealand) Vea Taumoefolau (Prop)
- (New Zealand) Jayden Henderson (Hooker)
- (New Zealand) Max Fale (Lock)
- (New Zealand) Jake Frost (Lock)
- (New Zealand) Konrad Toleafoa (Loose forward)
- (Samoa) **Joel Lam** (Halfback)
- (New Zealand) Aaron Gibbs (First five-eighth)
- (New Zealand) Cooper Grant (Midfielder)
- (New Zealand) Jae Broomfield (Outside back)
- (New Zealand) Logan Williams (Outside back)

== Past players ==
=== List of All Blacks ===
Due to the success of the Crusaders throughout Super Rugby, many players that have represented the Crusaders have gone on to play international test rugby for the All Blacks. List of All Blacks that have represented the Crusaders:

| All Black Number | Name | All Black Number | Name | All Black Number | Name | All Black Number | Name | All Black Number | Name | All Black Number | Name |
|---|---|---|---|---|---|---|---|---|---|---|---|
| 881 | Richard Loe | 985 | Daryl Gibson | 1017 | Sam Broomhall | 1078 | Kevin O'Neill | 1123 | Matt Todd | 1181 | Brett Cameron |
| 928 | Pat Lam | 986 | Norm Maxwell | 1019 | Andrew Hore | 1083 | Kieran Read | 1124 | Ryan Crotty | 1182 | Sevu Reece |
| 929 | Dallas Seymour | 987 | Greg Feek | 1022 | Ali Williams | 1084 | Ben Franks | 1125 | Tom Taylor | 1184 | Braydon Ennor |
| 944 | Andrew Mehrtens | 988 | Reuben Thorne | 1024 | Brad Mika | 1088 | Isaac Ross | 1127 | Dominic Bird | 1191 | Will Jordan |
| 947 | Todd Blackadder | 991 | Greg Somerville | 1034 | Daniel Carter | 1089 | Tanerau Latimer | 1129 | Luke Whitelock | 1192 | Cullen Grace |
| 948 | Justin Marshall | 994 | Ron Cribb | 1035 | Brad Thorn | 1091 | Wyatt Crockett | 1134 | Joe Moody | 1194 | George Bower |
| 950 | Tabai Matson | 995 | Leon MacDonald | 1036 | Corey Flynn | 1093 | George Whitelock | 1139 | Nepo Laulala | 1195 | Ethan Blackadder |
| 955 | Con Barrell | 996 | Mark Robinson | 1042 | Mose Tuiali'i | 1094 | Owen Franks | 1143 | Codie Taylor | 1200 | Leicester Fainga'anuku |
| 966 | Steve Surridge | 1003 | Chris Jack | 1043 | Rico Gear | 1096 | Tom Donnelly | 1148 | Seta Tamanivalu | 1205 | Fletcher Newell |
| 969 | Mark Mayerhofler | 1004 | Ben Blair | 1048 | Casey Laulala | 1097 | Zac Guildford | 1155 | Scott Barrett | 1209 | Tamaiti Williams |
| 970 | Caleb Ralph | 1005 | Dave Hewett | 1056 | Campbell Johnstone | 1101 | Israel Dagg | 1161 | David Havili | 1213 | Dallas Mcleod |
| 974 | Scott Robertson | 1008 | Nathan Mauger | 1058 | Kevin Senio | 1104 | Sam Whitelock | 1162 | Tim Perry | 1225 | Christian Lio-Willie |
| 976 | Norm Berryman | 1013 | Aaron Mauger | 1067 | Scott Hamilton | 1107 | Colin Slade | 1165 | Jack Goodhue | 1231 | Kyle Preston |
| 979 | Pita Alatini | 1014 | Richie McCaw | 1068 | Andy Ellis | 1108 | Sonny Bill Williams | 1167 | Richie Mo'unga | | |
| 984 | Mark Hammett | 1016 | Sam Harding | 1070 | Ross Filipo | 1114 | Luke Romano | 1178 | George Bridge | | |

=== Notable players ===
Twenty Four players have played over 100 games for the franchise.

In order of most capped:

- Wyatt Crockett (202)
- Samuel Whitelock (180)
- Owen Franks (163)
- Kieran Read (157)
- Ryan Crotty (156)
- Andy Ellis (155)
- Corey Flynn (151)
- Mitchell Drummond (150)
- Codie Taylor (146)
- Richie McCaw (145)
- David Havili (142)
- Dan Carter (141)
- Matt Todd (141)
- Luke Romano (136)
- Scott Barrett (132)
- Reuben Thorne (129)
- Joe Moody (128)
- Caleb Ralph (126)
- Leon MacDonald (122)
- Greg Somerville (115)
- Chris Jack (114)
- Richie Mo'unga (109)
- Justin Marshall (105)
- Jordan Taufua (101)

Half-back Justin Marshall was the first player to achieve the feat, playing for the Crusaders between 1996 and 2005. Both Thorne and Ralph achieved the 100-game mark at the same time. However, Ralph had played nine of his matches for other franchises: three for the Chiefs and six for the Blues. Ralph achieved the "100 Crusaders games" feat later that season; remarkably, they were played consecutively. Greg Somerville became the next player to contribute 100 games for the franchise, achieving this in the 2006 semi-final against the Bulls. The first match of the 2008 season was Leon MacDonald's 100th game, and on 11 March 2011 Chris Jack started against the Brumbies to play his 100th match for the Crusaders. The Crusaders also boast three winners of the IRB International Player of the Year Award: Dan Carter (2005, 2012 and 2015), Kieran Read (2013) and Richie McCaw (2006, 2009 and 2010).

=== 1996–2005 Team of the decade ===
On the eve of the last Super 12 final in 2005, a panel of experts picked the Crusaders team of the decade, which was published by the Christchurch Press. The experts chosen to select the team were: Tane Norton (former All Blacks captain), Vance Stewart (first Crusaders coach), Dick Tayler (president of supporters club), Bob Schumacher (former Christchurch Press rugby writer) and Tony Smith (Christchurch Press rugby writer).

The most notable omissions from the team were Dan Carter, Richard Loe, and Reuben Thorne. Daniel Carter was omitted due to the strength of Andrew Mehrtens and Aaron Mauger who occupied the first and second five-eighth positions respectively, and because he was regarded as "the star of the next decade". Despite being considered one of Canterbury's best ever props, Richard Loe missed out as he was only in the team for the unsuccessful 1996 season. The former All Black captain Reuben Thorne was omitted due to the quality of players in the lock and blindside flanker positions. The most unlikely inclusion was for Norm Berryman at right wing. Berryman was picked over Marika Vunibaka and Afato So'oalo due to his crucial tries late in the 1998 and 1999 seasons that helped the Crusaders qualify for the semi-finals. The team:

Crusaders Super 12 Team of the Decade
| Number | Name | Position |
| 15 | Leon MacDonald | Fullback |
| 14 | Norm Berryman | Right-wing |
| 13 | Daryl Gibson | Centre |
| 12 | Aaron Mauger | Second five-eighth |
| 11 | Caleb Ralph | Left-wing |
| 10 | Andrew Mehrtens | First five-eighth |
| 9 | Justin Marshall | Half back |
| 8 | Scott Robertson | Number-eight |
| 7 | Richie McCaw | Openside flanker |
| 6 | Todd Blackadder (Captain) | Blindside flanker |
| 5 | Norm Maxwell | Lock |
| 4 | Chris Jack | Lock |
| 3 | Greg Somerville | Tighthead prop |
| 2 | Mark Hammett | Hooker |
| 1 | Greg Feek | Loosehead prop |

=== Crusaders Hall of Fame ===
A Crusaders Hall of Fame was created in 2023. A selection committee was formed to meet twice a year and help select the annual inductees. The current committee is: Bob Stewart (chairperson), John Miles, Brian Ashby, Lesley Murdoch, Sam Broomhall, Angus Gardiner, Rob Penney and Willie Heinz.

The Hall of fame inductees are:

| Number | Year | Name |
|---|---|---|
| 1 | 2023 | Todd Blackadder |
| 2 | 2023 | Justin Marshall |
| 3 | 2023 | Wayne Smith |
| 4 | 2024 | Norm Maxwell |
| 5 | 2024 | Leon MacDonald |
| 6 | 2024 | Reuben Thorne |
| 7 | 2025 | Mark Hammett |
| 8 | 2025 | Caleb Ralph |
| 9 | 2025 | Greg Somerville |

== Coaches ==
The Crusaders were coached in their first season by Vance Stewart, who was assisted by Aussie Mclean. Stewart was replaced by Wayne Smith in 1997; McLean too was replaced, by Peter Sloane. Smith continued as coach until he was appointed All Blacks coach after the 1999 season. Robbie Deans took over the reins for the 2000 season. Deans has had several assistants: in 2000 and 2001 his assistant was Steve Hansen; in 2002, Colin Cooper; in 2003 and 2004, Don Hayes; and in 2005 and 2006, Vern Cotter. Deans' assistant for the 2007 season was former Crusader Mark Hammett. Deans was appointed coach of Australia in December 2007, but was allowed to continue coaching the Crusaders in the 2008 season. Former captain, Todd Blackadder was appointed his successor in July 2008, with Hammett continuing as assistant coach. Hammett was appointed Hurricanes coach from the beginning of the 2011 season, and consequently former prop Dave Hewett was appointed assistant forwards coach. In June 2016, Scott Robertson, former Crusaders player and former head coach of the Canterbury National Provincial team and the New Zealand Under 20 rugby team, was announced as the Crusaders head coach from 2017, and finished his tenure with the team in 2023. On June 6, 2023, Rob Penney was announced as the replacement for Scott Robertson as head coach of the Crusaders. He is assisted by former Crusaders Flanker Matt Todd from 2024 onwards.

== Former coaches and records ==
=== Coaches ===
Crusaders coaches by date, matches and win percentage*
| Coach | Period | G | W | D | L | % |
|---|---|---|---|---|---|---|
| Vance Stewart | 1996 | 11 | 2 | 1 | 8 | 18.2 |
| Wayne Smith | 1997–1999 | 37 | 24 | 2 | 11 | 64.9 |
| Robbie Deans | 2000–2008 | 120 | 89 | 1 | 30 | 74.2 |
| Todd Blackadder (Note: One match was cancelled and called a draw due to the 2011 Christchurch earthquake and is included on the table.) | 2009–2016 | 133 | 85 | 3 | 45 | 63.9 |
| Scott Robertson (Note: One match was cancelled and called a draw due to the 2019 Christchurch Mosque Shootings and is included on the table.) (Note: The final match in 2020 against the Blues was cancelled due to COVID-19 restrictions and was called a draw and is included on the table.) (Note: Includes one match Robertson was unable to attend due to a family bereavement.) | 2017–2023 | 118 | 98 | 4 | 16 | 83.1 |
| Rob Penney | 2024–2026 | 47 | 27 | 0 | 20 | 57.4 |
| Totals (1996–present)^{*} | | 466 | 325 | 11 | 130 | 69.7 |
Updated to: 9 July 2026

Notes:

^* Official Super Rugby competition matches only, including finals.

== Print sources ==
- Gifford, Phil (2004). The Passion – The Stories Behind 125 years of Canterbury Rugby. Wilson Scott Publishing. ISBN 0-9582535-1-X.
- Howitt, Bob (2005). SANZAR Saga – Ten Years of Super 12 and Tri-Nations Rugby. Harper Collins Publishers. ISBN 1-86950-566-2.
- McIlraith, Matt (2005). Ten Years of Super 12. Hodder Moa. ISBN 1-86971-025-8.
- Palenski, Ron (2003). Century in Black – 100 Years of All Black Test Rugby. Hodder Moa Beckett Publishers Limited. ISBN 1-86958-937-8.

| Preceded by 1997 – Blues; 2001 – Brumbies; 2004 – Brumbies; 2007 – Bulls | Super 12/Super 14 Champions; 1998 (first title) – 1999 (second title) – 2000 (third title); 2002 (fourth title); 2005 (fifth title) – 2006 (sixth title); 2008 (seventh title) | Succeeded by 2001 – Brumbies; 2003 – Blues; 2007 – Bulls; 2009 – Bulls |
