= Jacob Devery =

New Zealand rugby union player (born 1998)

- Born: 21 October 1998 (age 28) Hastings, New Zealand
- Height: 180 cm (5 ft 11 in)
- Weight: 105 kg (16 st 7 lb; 231 lb)
- School: Hastings Boys' High School

Rugby union career
- Position: Hooker
- Current team: Hawke's Bay, Hurricanes
Senior career
Years	Team	Apps	(Points)
2017–	Hawke's Bay	45	(50)
2022–	Hurricanes	25	(20)
- Correct as of 23 June 2026
International career
Years	Team	Apps	(Points)
2025	Māori All Blacks	3	(0)
- Correct as of 1 July 2026

Jacob Devery (born 21 October 1998) is a New Zealand rugby union player, who currently plays as a hooker for Hawke's Bay in New Zealand's domestic National Provincial Championship competition and the Hurricanes in Super Rugby.

== Early career ==
Devery attended Hastings Boys' High School, where he played three years in the First XV team, alongside future Hawke's Bay teammates Devan Flanders, Folau Fakatava, Lincoln McClutchie, Danny Toala and Kianu Kereru-Symes. In his final year, 2016, he helped his team win the Super 8 title after beating Hamilton Boys' High School 30–8 in the final and reach the National Top 4 final, which they narrowly lost to Mount Albert Grammar School (13–14).

Devery was selected for the Hurricanes Under 18 team in 2016 and represented Hawke's Bay at the Jock Hobbs Memorial National Under 19 Tournament in 2018.

While Devery's current preferred position is hooker, as a youngster he started playing at second five-eighth (inside centre) and has – years later – made the occasional appearance in the 12 jersey. He has also frequently played as a Number 8 in club rugby, including for Hastings Rugby & Sports Club during the 2021 club rugby season.

== Senior career ==
Devery was, for the first time, named in the Hawke's Bay squad for the 2017 Mitre 10 Cup season. He made his debut – off the bench – for the province on 25 August 2017 against Bay of Plenty and earned his first start on 6 September 2017 against Wellington. He played 7 games for Hawke's Bay that season.

His performance in 2017 saw him selected for the NZ Marist team to play a Heartland XV side. He also played for the team in 2019.

While he was named in the Hawke's Bay squad for the 2018 Mitre 10 Cup season, he didn't play any games for the Magpies that year due to being injured for a large part of the season. Being the third choice hooker for Hawke's Bay behind Ash Dixon and Kianu Kereru-Symes, he didn't get much game time in 2019 and 2020 either, but things changed in 2021. In the absence of injured Kereru-Symes, Devery first got game time off the reserves bench and later earned several starts after Ash Dixon got injured and then left for Japan. He scored five tries for the Magpies in 2021.

His performance for the Magpies in 2021 didn't go unnoticed. While Devery wasn't named in the Hurricanes squad for the 2022 Super Rugby Pacific season, he was called into the squad during preseason and played in both of the Hurricanes' preseason games. Devery made his Super Rugby debut for the franchise (off the bench) on 19 February 2022 in their round 1 clash with the Crusaders.

In 2026, Devery was part of the Hurricanes squad that won the Super Rugby Pacific title. On 20 June, the Hurricanes defeated the Chiefs 60–5 in the final.

== International rugby ==
Devery was invited to attend the New Zealand Under 20 development camp in December 2017. Due to injury, he wasn't considered for the following trial camp and missed out on a spot in the New Zealand Under 20 team for the 2018 Oceania Rugby Under 20 Championship and World Rugby U20 Championship.

On 24 June 2025, Devery - who is of Te Aitanga-a-Māhaki descent - was named in the Māori All Blacks squad for a two-test series against Japan XV and Scotland. He made his debut for the side - off the bench - against Japan XV on 28 June 2025 in Tokyo.

== Career honours ==
Hurricanes

- Super Rugby: 2026

Hawke's Bay

- Mitre 10 Cup Championship: 2020
