= Danny Toala =

New Zealand rugby union player (born 1999)

- Born: 26 March 1999 (age 27) Hastings, New Zealand
- Height: 1.76 m (5 ft 9 in)
- Weight: 95 kg (209 lb; 14 st 13 lb)
- School: Hastings Boys' High School

Rugby union career
- Position(s): Midfield back, Fullback
- Current team: Oyonnax
Senior career
Years	Team	Apps	(Points)
2018–2022, 2024–2025	Hawke's Bay	52	(130)
2019–2021	Hurricanes	4	(0)
2022–2025	Moana Pasifika	39	(35)
2025–	Oyonnax	11	(10)
- Correct as of 5 June 2026
International career
Years	Team	Apps	(Points)
2019	New Zealand U20	2	(0)
2022–	Samoa	15	(18)
- Correct as of 20 July 2026

Danny Toala (born 26 March 1999) is a professional rugby union player, who currently plays as a midfield back or fullback for Oyonnax in the French Pro D2. He previously played for Moana Pasifika in Super Rugby and for Hawke's Bay in New Zealand's domestic National Provincial Championship competition. He was born and raised in New Zealand, but has represented Manu Samoa internationally, for which he is eligible due to his Samoan heritage.

== Early career ==
Danny Toala attended Hastings Boys' High School, where he played First XV rugby alongside future Hawke's Bay teammates Devan Flanders, Folau Fakatava, Lincoln McClutchie and Kianu Kereru-Symes. He helped his team to two National Top 4 finals, narrowly losing the first 13 – 14 to Mount Albert Grammar School in 2016, but winning the second a year later against Hamilton Boys' High School 25 to 17 after an undefeated season.

Both in 2016 and 2017, Toala was named in the Hurricanes U18 squad.

== Senior career ==
On 7 August 2017, the Hawke's Bay Rugby Union announced that four players of that year's successful Hastings Boys' High School First XV side, including Danny Toala, had signed with the union for the 2018 and 2019 Mitre 10 Cup seasons. Toala made his Magpies debut on 30 September 2018 against Canterbury. He has since re-signed with Hawke's Bay for 2020 and 2021.

Although he had played just four games for the Magpies, the Hurricanes announced on 24 April 2019 that they had signed Toala until 2021, considering him "a real stand-out for the Hurricanes Hunters and Under-20 sides". On 3 June 2019, Toala was called into the Hurricanes squad as an injury replacement for their game against the Lions in South Africa. He made his debut for the Hurricanes on 9 June 2019 in Johannesburg and earned his first Super Rugby start a week later against the Blues in Wellington.

Due to being given limited playing opportunities, Toala only played four games for the Hurricanes during his 3 years at the franchise.

On 26 October 2021, Moana Pasifika announced that the new franchise had signed Toala for the 2022 Super Rugby Pacific season. He made his debut for his new team in their inaugural Super Rugby game on 4 March 2022 against the Crusaders. He played four seasons for the franchise.

On 6 June 2025, Moana Pasifika announced the departure of 15 players from its squad; Toala was listed as one of those players. Six days later, on 12 June 2025, French Pro D2 club Oyonnax announced that Toala was one of the new players that would join the club for the 2025–26 Rugby Pro D2 season. He made his debut for the side on 29 August 2025 in their round 1 game against Grenoble.

== International career ==
In 2016, following his first successful First XV season playing for Hastings Boys' High School, Toala was named in the New Zealand Barbarians Schools' team that played matches against Australian Schools and Fiji Schools. He scored a try in both games.

The following year, Toala was named in the New Zealand Secondary Schools team for a three-match international series in Australia. He played in two games, including a 34 – 11 victory over Australian Schools, and kicked nine conversions.

Toala was a member of the New Zealand Under-20 side that competed in the 2019 Oceania Rugby Under 20 Championship.

On 2 June 2022, Toala – who is of Samoan descent – was named in the Manu Samoa squad for the first time. He made his international debut on 2 July 2022 against Australia A in their first game of the 2022 Pacific Nations Cup, which they won 31–26.
