= Lincoln McClutchie =

New Zealand rugby union player (born 1999)

- Born: 12 April 1999 (age 27) Wairoa, New Zealand
- Height: 174 cm (5 ft 9 in)
- Weight: 84 kg (185 lb; 13 st 3 lb)
- School: Hastings Boys' High School

Rugby union career
- Position: First five-eighth
- Current team: Hawke's Bay, San Diego Legion
Senior career
Years	Team	Apps	(Points)
2018–	Hawke's Bay	84	(559)
2020	Red Hurricanes Osaka	4	(4)
2022–2023	Moana Pasifika	20	(58)
2024–	San Diego Legion	25	(150)
- Correct as of 13 December 2025

Lincoln McClutchie (born 12 April 1999) is a New Zealand rugby union player, who currently plays as a first five-eighth for Hawke's Bay in New Zealand's domestic National Provincial Championship competition and San Diego Legion in Major League Rugby.

== Early career ==
McClutchie attended Hastings Boys' High School, where he played First XV rugby alongside future Hawke's Bay teammates Folau Fakatava, Devan Flanders, Danny Toala and Kianu Kereru-Symes. He helped his team to two National Top 4 finals, narrowly losing the first against Mount Albert Grammar School (13 - 14) in 2016, but winning the second against Hamilton Boys' High School 25 to 17 after an undefeated season in 2017.

He played representative rugby for several Hawke's Bay age grade teams, including at U16 level in 2015 and U19 level in 2018.

In 2015, McClutchie was for the first time invited to attend the Hurricanes (U18) Development camp. Both in 2016 and 2017, he was named in the Hurricanes U18 squad to play the Crusaders U18 team.

== Senior career ==
On 7 August 2017, the Hawke's Bay Rugby Union announced that four players of that year's successful Hastings Boys' High School First XV side, including Lincoln McClutchie, had signed with the union for the 2018 and 2019 seasons. McClutchie made his Magpies debut on 22 September 2018 against North Harbour, starting instead of the regular fly-half, Tiaan Falcon, who had suffered an injury in the previous game.

During the 2019 Super Rugby season, McClutchie was briefly called into the Highlanders squad as injury cover and he also represented the Hurricanes at U20 level. However, despite a second successful season with Hawke's Bay, McClutchie missed out on a contract for the 2020 Super Rugby season.

In November 2019, McClutchie signed with NTT DoCoMo Red Hurricanes Osaka for the 2020 Top League season. Unfortunately, he only played four games for the club. The competition was cancelled after round 6 due to the COVID-19 pandemic and McClutchie returned to New Zealand.

In July 2020, McClutchie re-signed with Hawke's Bay for 2020 and 2021. During the 2020 Mitre 10 Cup season, the Magpies won the Ranfurly Shield (taking it off Otago), were successful in three more Ranfurly Shield defences (against Northland, Manawatu and Wellington), and won the Mitre 10 Cup Championship, thus securing a well-deserved promotion to the Premiership division. The Magpies held on to the Shield during the entire 2021 Bunnings NPC season, winning all six Ranfurly Shield defences. McClutchie played an important role in his province's success and his efforts paid off.

On 20 October 2021, Moana Pasifika announced that the new franchise had signed McClutchie for the 2022 Super Rugby Pacific season. He made his Super Rugby debut for Moana Pasifika in their inaugural game on 4 March 2022 against the Crusaders. He went on to play 20 games for the franchise.

On 8 December 2023, San Diego Legion announced the signing of McClutchie ahead of the 2024 Major League Rugby season. He made his MLR debut for the club in its round 2 game against Dallas Jackals.

== International career ==
In 2016, following his first successful First XV season playing for Hastings Boys' High School, McClutchie was named in the New Zealand Barbarians Schools' team. He captained the team in its first game against Australian Schools, a game the NZ Barbarians Schools' team won 28– 17, with McClutchie scoring one of the tries. After that game, he was promoted to the New Zealand Secondary Schools team and played Australian Schools again, this time coming off the bench. NZ Schools won the game 32 to 22. In the official report of the match series, McClutchie was named as one of the standout performers.

The following year, McClutchie was named in the New Zealand Secondary Schools team for a three-match international series in Australia. He played in all three games, including a 34 – 11 victory over Australian Schools in which he scored one of the tries.
