= Kianu Kereru-Symes =

New Zealand rugby union player (born 1999)

- Full name: Kianu Kereru-Symes
- Born: 28 February 1999 (age 27) Māhia, New Zealand
- Height: 180 cm (5 ft 11 in)
- Weight: 106 kg (234 lb; 16 st 10 lb)
- School: Hastings Boys' High School

Rugby union career
- Position(s): Hooker, Prop
- Current team: Hawke's Bay
Senior career
Years	Team	Apps	(Points)
2018–	Hawke's Bay	74	(45)
2022–2024	Hurricanes	4	(5)
2023	New England Free Jacks	11	(0)
2024–2025	Urayasu D-Rocks	5	(0)
- Correct as of 5 November 2025
International career
Years	Team	Apps	(Points)
2019	New Zealand U20	7	(0)
- Correct as of 9 April 2022

Kianu Kereru-Symes (born 28 February 1999) is a New Zealand rugby union player, who currently plays as a hooker or prop for Hawke's Bay in New Zealand's domestic National Provincial Championship competition and Urayasu D-Rocks in Japan Rugby League One. He previously played for the Hurricanes in Super Rugby and the New England Free Jacks in Major League Rugby (MLR) in the United States.

== Personal life and early career ==
Kereru-Symes hails from Māhia, in the Hawke's Bay region on the east coast of New Zealand's North Island. His half-brother, Tom Symes, played 43 games at prop for Hawke's Bay from 2002 to 2007. His cousin Paul Symes also played 2 games for the Magpies in 1998–1999, represented East Coast and played for the Central Vikings.

Kereru-Symes attended Hastings Boys' High School, where he captained and played for the school's First XV rugby team, alongside future Hawke's Bay teammates Folau Fakatava, Devan Flanders, Lincoln McClutchie and Danny Toala. He started at loosehead prop for Hastings Boys' in their first National Top 4 final against Mount Albert Grammar School in 2016, but had to leave the field with a suspected concussion after 15 minutes. Hastings Boys' narrowly lost that final 13–14. In 2017, he captained the team to a National Top 4 victory, beating Hamilton Boys' High School 25 to 17 in the final after an undefeated season.

He played representative rugby for several Hawke's Bay age grade teams, including at U13, U14, U16 and U19 level.

Both in 2016 and 2017, Kereru-Symes was named in the Hurricanes U18 team to play the Crusaders U18 team in their annual game.

== Senior career ==
While he played at prop during his First XV days, Kereru-Symes switched to hooker after he left school.

Kereru-Symes was, for the first time, named in the Hawke's Bay squad for the 2018 Mitre 10 Cup season. He made his debut for the province – via the bench – on 8 September 2018 against Bay of Plenty and earned his first start five days later against Waikato. He scored his first try for the Magpies on 22 September 2018 against North Harbour. At the end of his first season, on 23 October 2018, he won the Magpies Players Player of the Year award and Rookie of the Year award at the team's end-of-season awards function.

From his first season, Kereru-Symes established himself as a reliable back-up for regular starting Magpies hooker Ash Dixon. His excellent performance for Hawke's Bay in 2018 lead to him being named in the Hurricanes U20 team in 2019. He also played for the Hurricanes Development team.

The following year, he was part of the wider Hurricanes squad and trained with – and played for – the franchise during preseason. Later in 2020, he also trained with the Blues and Highlanders after being called up as injury cover. He played for the Blues A team, but didn't get any game time in Super Rugby.

He was called into the Crusaders squad for preseason ahead of the 2022 Super Rugby season and played in their preseason game against the Highlanders.

On 9 April 2022, Kereru-Symes was called up by the Hurricanes for their game against the Crusaders, as a late replacement for Asafo Aumua. He was named on the reserves bench, but didn't get game time. He made his Super Rugby debut three days later, on Tuesday 12 April 2022, when he started for the Hurricanes against Moana Pasifika. He scored a try on debut.

On 9 January 2023, the New England Free Jacks announced the signing of Kereru-Symes ahead of the 2023 Major League Rugby season. He made his debut for the side – via the reserves bench – on 11 March 2023 against Old Glory DC. On 9 July 2023, he started at loosehead prop for the New England Free Jacks in their Major League Rugby final against San Diego Legion. The Free Jacks won that final 25–24 to be crowned the Major League Rugby champions for the first time.

In 2024, once again, Kereru-Symes was called into the Hurricanes squad as an injury replacement player and played his first game of the season as the starting hooker against the Waratahs on 3 May 2024.

On 8 November 2024, Japan Rugby League One club Urayasu D-Rocks announced that Kereru-Symes would join the club for the 2024–2025 season. He made his debut for the side in the round 6 game against Saitama Wild Knights on 1 February 2025. He played 5 games for the club.

== International career ==
In 2016, following his successful First XV season playing for Hastings Boys' High School, Kereru-Symes was named in the New Zealand Barbarians Schools' team that played matches against Australian Schools and Fiji Schools. He played at loosehead prop in both games. A year later, he was again invited to attend the New Zealand Schools development camp, but was unavailable for selection for the New Zealand Secondary Schools team due to injury.

Kereru-Symes was the captain of the New Zealand Under-20 side that competed in the 2019 Oceania Rugby Under 20 Championship and the 2019 World Rugby Under 20 Championship.

== Career honours ==
Hawke's Bay

- Mitre 10 Cup Championship winner - 2020

New England Free Jacks

- Major League Rugby Championship winner - 2023
