= Devan Flanders =

New Zealand rugby union player

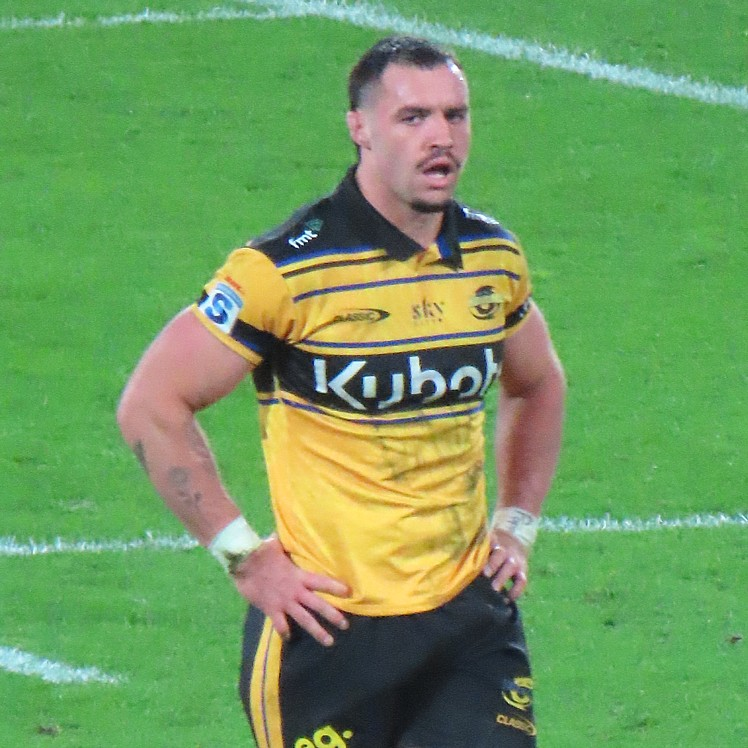
- Flanders playing for the Hurricanes in the 2026 Super Rugby Pacific final
- Born: 20 July 1999 (age 27) Havelock North, New Zealand
- Height: 193 cm (6 ft 4 in)
- Weight: 108 kg (17 st 0 lb; 238 lb)
- School: Hastings Boys' High School
- Notable relative: Cooper Flanders (brother)

Rugby union career
- Position(s): Number 8, Flanker
- Current team: Urayasu D-Rocks
Senior career
Years	Team	Apps	(Points)
2018–2025	Hawke's Bay	77	(75)
2020–2026	Hurricanes	70	(60)
2026–	Urayasu D-Rocks		
- Correct as of 1 July 2026
International career
Years	Team	Apps	(Points)
2018–2019	New Zealand U20	11	(10)
2024–2025	All Blacks XV	5	(0)
- Correct as of 6 December 2025

Devan Flanders (born 20 July 1999) is a New Zealand rugby union player who currently plays as a loose forward for Urayasu D-Rocks in Division 1 of the Japan Rugby League One competition. He previously played for the Hurricanes in Super Rugby and Hawke's Bay in New Zealand's domestic National Provincial Championship competition.

== Early career ==
Devan Flanders attended Hastings Boys' High School, where he played First XV rugby alongside future Hawke's Bay teammates Folau Fakatava, Lincoln McClutchie, Danny Toala and Kianu Kereru-Symes. He helped his team to two National Top 4 finals, narrowly losing the first against Mount Albert Grammar School (13 - 14) in 2016, but winning the second against Hamilton Boys' High School 25 to 17 after an undefeated season in 2017. Flanders was named man of the match following that victory.

In 2017, Flanders was named in the Hurricanes U18 team.

== Senior career ==
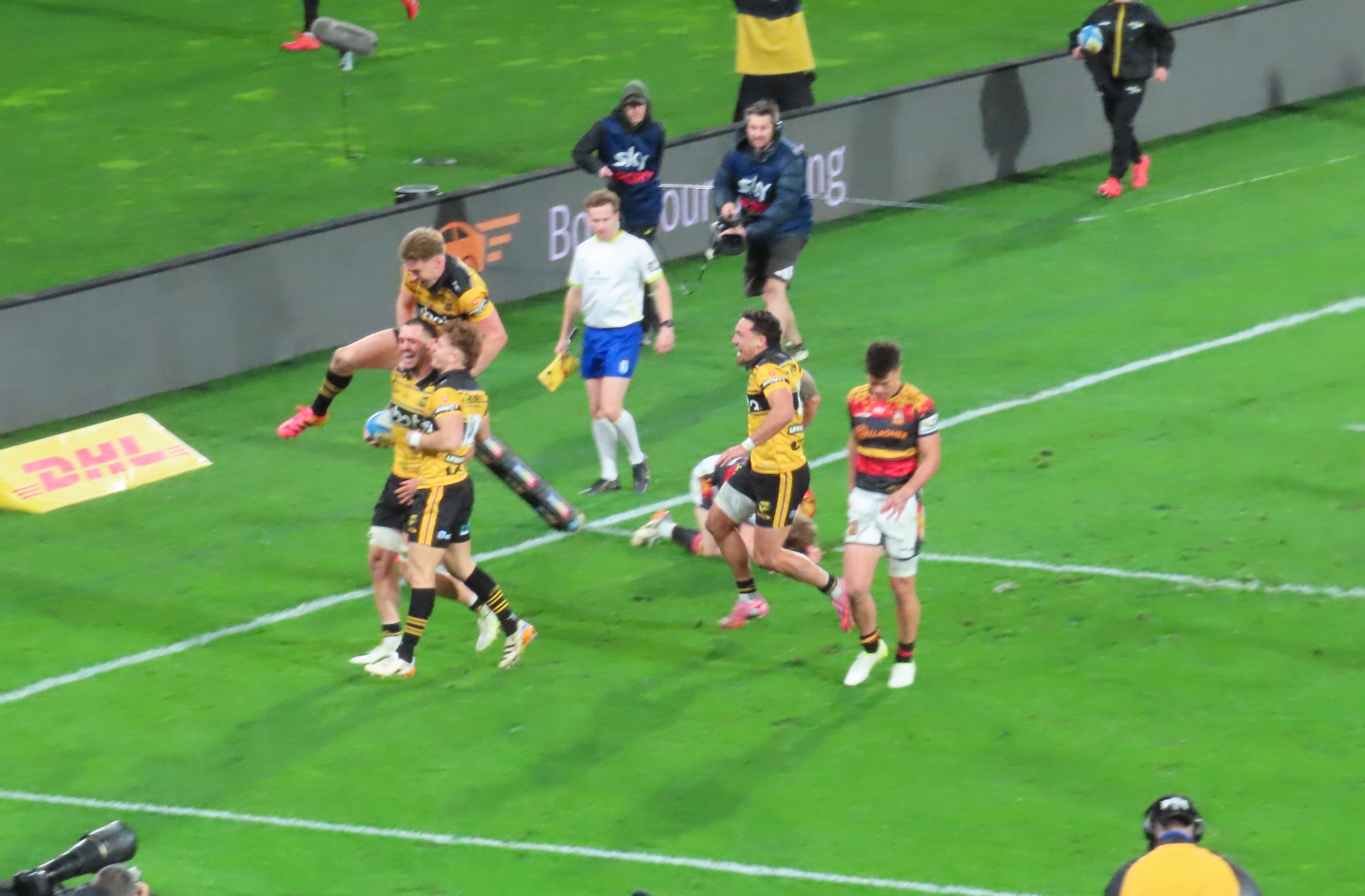
Flanders scoring a try for the Hurricanes in the 2026 Super Rugby Pacific final.

On 7 August 2017, the Hawke's Bay Rugby Union announced that four players of that year's successful Hastings Boys' High School First XV side, including Devan Flanders, had signed with the union for 2018 and 2019. Flanders made his Magpies debut on 19 August 2018 against Southland and earned his first start against Canterbury on 30 September 2018. He cemented himself as a regular starter for the Magpies in the following seasons. He has since re-signed with Hawke's Bay for 2020 and 2021.

Flanders signed his first contract with the Hurricanes for the 2020 season and made his Super Rugby debut for the franchise on 2 February 2020 against the Stormers. He scored his first try for the Hurricanes during their Super Rugby Aotearoa game against the Highlanders on 12 July 2020.

On 26 June 2020, the Hurricanes announced that Flanders had re-signed with the franchise for the 2021 and 2022 seasons. In 2022, he-resigned for a further two seasons and again in 2024.

Flanders played seven seasons for the Hurricanes, during which he played 70 games for the franchise. He left New Zealand as a Super Rugby champion after the Hurricanes won the title at the end of the 2026 Super Rugby Pacific season. On 20 June, the Hurricanes defeated the Chiefs 60–5 in the final and Flanders scored one of the Hurricanes' nine tries.

Japanese club Urayasu D-Rocks announced on 10 July 2026 that it had signed Flanders ahead of the 2026–27 Japan Rugby League One season.

== International career ==
After his last year at Hastings Boys' High School, Flanders was named in the New Zealand Secondary Schools team for a three-match international series in Australia. He started in all three games, including a 34 - 11 victory over Australian Schools. For his outstanding performance during the series Flanders was rewarded with the Jerry Collins Memorial Bronze Boot.

Flanders was a member of the New Zealand Under-20 side that competed in the Oceania Rugby Under 20 Championship and the World Rugby Under 20 Championship in 2018 and 2019.

Whilst not initially named in the All Blacks XV squad for two matches against Munster and Georgia, Flanders was called into the squad on 30 October 2024 as a replacement player. He made his debut for the team on 2 November 2024 in the game against Munster, which ended in a 38–14 victory to the All Blacks XV.

== Career honours ==
Hurricanes

- Super Rugby: 2026

Hawke's Bay

- Mitre 10 Cup Championship: 2020
