= Folau Fakatava =

New Zealand rugby union player (born 1999)

- Full name: Folau Moe Lotu Nonu Fakatava
- Born: 16 December 1999 (age 26) Nukuʻalofa, Tonga
- Height: 177 cm (5 ft 10 in)
- Weight: 80 kg (176 lb; 12 st 8 lb)
- School: Hastings Boys' High School

Rugby union career
- Position: Halfback
- Current team: Hawke's Bay, Highlanders
Senior career
Years	Team	Apps	(Points)
2018–	Hawke's Bay	65	(75)
2019–	Highlanders	72	(60)
- Correct as of 16 June 2026
International career
Years	Team	Apps	(Points)
2020	Moana Pasifika	1	(0)
2022–	New Zealand	2	(0)
2023–	All Blacks XV	4	(15)
2025	AUNZ Invitational XV	1	(0)
- Correct as of 7 December 2025

Folau Fakatava (born 16 December 1999) is a New Zealand rugby union player who plays as a scrum-half for the Highlanders in Super Rugby and Hawke's Bay in New Zealand's domestic National Provincial Championship competition.

== Early career ==
Fakatava was born in Nuku'alofa, Tonga, and started playing rugby while at high school. Hoping to be awarded a scholarship from a New Zealand school, he travelled with national age-group teams to New Zealand to play against Auckland schools. After three years, he was successful in his endeavour and, at the age of 16, moved to New Zealand to attend Hastings Boys' High School. While there, he played First XV rugby alongside future Hawke's Bay teammates Devan Flanders, Lincoln McClutchie, Danny Toala and Kianu Kereru-Symes. He helped his team to two National Top 4 finals, narrowly losing the first 13 - 14 to Mount Albert Grammar School in 2016, but winning the second a year later against Hamilton Boys' High School 25 to 17 after an undefeated season. Unfortunately, Fakatava got injured in the semi-final and couldn't take part in that 2017 final.

In 2017, Fakatava was named in the Hurricanes U18 team that beat Crusaders U18 by 25 to 10.

== Senior career ==
On 7 August 2017, the Hawke's Bay Rugby Union announced that four players of that year's successful Hastings Boys' High School First XV side, including Folau Fakatava, had signed with the union for the 2018 and 2019 Mitre 10 Cup seasons. Fakatava made his debut against Southland on 19 August 2018 and went on to play eight games that first season, mostly as a replacement for incumbent scrum-half Brad Weber. With Weber in the All Blacks squad for the 2019 Rugby World Cup, the 2020 Bledisloe Cup and Tri Nations, Fakatava established himself as the starting scrumhalf for the Magpies in the following seasons. In 2020, he was named the Mitre 10 Cup Player of the Year and awarded the Duane Monkley Medal. He is contracted to Hawke's Bay for 2020 and 2021.

His efforts in the 2018 Mitre 10 Cup season earned Fakatava a three-year Super Rugby contract with the Highlanders. He made his debut for the southern franchise on 1 March 2019 against the Rebels.

== International career ==
As a 15-year-old, Fakatava represented Tonga at the 2015 Pacific Games in touch rugby.

In 2016, following his first successful First XV season playing for Hastings Boys' High School, Fakatava was named in the New Zealand Barbarians Schools team that played matches against Australian Schools and Fiji Schools.

The following year, he was invited to attend the 2017 Schools Rugby Development Camp, but was unavailable for the New Zealand Secondary Schools team for a three-match international series in Australia, due to injury.

On 5 December 2020, Fakatava played for the Moana Pasifika team in a one-off match against the Māori All Blacks.

On 13 June 2022, Fakatava was – for the first time – named in the All Blacks squad after qualifying on residency grounds. He made his test debut for New Zealand – coming off the bench – on 9 July 2022 against Ireland.

Having missed the All Blacks' 2022 Northern Tour due to reinjuring his ACL, he was named in the All Blacks XV squad for a two-match tour of Japan on 18 June 2023. He made his debut for the team via the bench on 8 July 2023, scoring a scintillating individual try on debut.

On 12 July 2025, Fakatava played for the AUNZ Invitational XV team – a combined team of Australian and New Zealand players – against the British & Irish Lions during their 2025 tour to Australia.

== Style of play ==
Head Coach Mark Ozich, who previously coached Fakatava at Hastings Boys' High School and later at the Magpies, said of him: "At schoolboy level he dominated with his ability to run from the base or a scrum or a lineout so picking his moments. ... One of his biggest strengths is to go to the line and put people into holes, or dummy and go himself. Lots of halfbacks can run and die with the ball, but Folau will run and offload in contact, he will put a short ball into somebody running an angle and he sees that space really well for a young halfback."
