= Auckland 1A 1st XV Rugby =

Rugby Union competition for Schools

- Sport: Rugby Union
- Founded: 1895; 128 years ago
- No. of teams: 12 (2026)
- Country: New Zealand
- Most recent champion: Kings College (2025)
- Most titles: Auckland Grammar (65 titles)

Auckland 1A 1st XV Rugby is the Premier Rugby Union competition for secondary schools and colleges in Auckland, New Zealand. Auckland 1A 1st XV Rugby is an annual promotion and relegation competition that usually takes place with 12 schools. The competition is organised and run by the Auckland Rugby Union.

== Teams ==
1A Teams (2026 Season)

- Auckland Grammar, Epsom
- Botany Downs Secondary College, East Tamaki
- De La Salle College, Mangere East
- Dilworth School, Epsom
- Kelston Boys High School, Kelston
- King's College, Otahuhu
- Liston College, Henderson
- Mount Albert Grammar, Mount Albert
- Sacred Heart College, Glendowie
- St Kentigern College, Pakuranga
- St Paul's College, Ponsonby
- St Peter's College, Epsom

== History ==
The competition has been running since 1895. Many different teams have competed in the competition since the start as there is a promotion/relegation fixture involved at the end of every season. The competition has had 12 different winners over 127 years. On 16 occasions, the title has been shared by two or more teams. In recent years the winner of the Auckland 1A 1st XV Rugby competition will play either the winner of the North Harbour 1st XV competition or the Northland 1st XV competition to become the Blues representative at the National First XV Championship. For many years the competition winner was decided after round-robin play but in recent years the competition has added Semi Finals and Finals after round-robin play to find an outright winner. Auckland Grammar are the most successful school in the competition. Auckland Grammar has had a rugby team dating back to 1871 where they played against club teams. Auckland Grammar has won a title in every decade since the competition started in 1895. The Auckland Rugby Union, along with Collegesport and the Secondary Schools Executive Committee are responsible for administering the local secondary school competitions. Auckland 1st XV rugby is split into three divisions 1A, 1B, 1C.

== Broadcast ==
Sky TV in New Zealand has been broadcasting Auckland 1a 1st XV games since 2009. Until 2018, games were available to watch to subscribers of the Rugby Channel, although in 2019 games were moved to Sky Sports. In 2022, principals from the Auckland High Schools involved decided that they would not let anyone live stream or broadcast any Auckland 1st XV matches because it "exposed players to an unhealthy level of scrutiny in both traditional and social media". This also meant that no interviews would be given by coaches and players before or during the season.

== List of winners ==
Year	Premiership Winners
1895	Auckland Grammar
1896	Auckland Grammar (2)
1897	Auckland Grammar (3)
1898	Auckland Grammar (4)
1899	Auckland Grammar (5)
1900	Auckland Grammar (6)
1901	Auckland Grammar (7)
1902	Auckland Grammar (8)
1903	St John's College
1904	St John's College (2)
1905	Auckland Grammar (9)
1906	Sacred Heart College
1907	Auckland Grammar (10)
1908	King's College
1909	King's College (2)
1910	Auckland Grammar (11)
1911	Auckland Grammar (12)
1912	Auckland Grammar (13) / King's College (3)
1913	Auckland Grammar (14)
1914	Auckland Grammar (15)
1915	Auckland Grammar (16)
1916	Auckland Grammar (17)
1917	Auckland Grammar (18)
1918	Auckland Grammar (19)
1919	Auckland Grammar (20)
1920	Auckland Grammar (21) / King's College (4)
1921	Auckland Grammar (22)
1922	Auckland Grammar (23)
1923	Mount Albert Grammar
1924	Mount Albert Grammar (2)
1925	Mount Albert Grammar (3)
1926	Auckland Grammar (24)
1927	King's College (5)
1928	King's College (6)
1929	Auckland Grammar (25)
1930	Auckland Grammar (26)
1931	Auckland Grammar (27)
1932	Auckland Grammar (28) / Mount Albert Grammar (4)
1933	Auckland Grammar (29)
1934	Auckland Grammar (30)
1935	Auckland Grammar (31)
1936	Auckland Grammar (32)
1937	Auckland Grammar (33)
1938	Mount Albert Grammar (5)
1939	Sacred Heart College (2)
1940	Auckland Grammar (34)
1941	Takapuna Grammar / Auckland Grammar (35)
1942	Auckland Grammar (36)
1943	Auckland Grammar (37) / Mount Albert Grammar (6)
1944	Mount Albert Grammar (7)
1945	Sacred Heart College (3)
1946	King's College (7)
1947	Mount Albert Grammar (8)
1948	King's College (8) / Sacred Heart College (4)
1949	Auckland Grammar (38)
1950	Auckland Grammar (39)
1951	Auckland Grammar (40)
1952	King's College (9)
1953	Sacred Heart College (5)
1954	Auckland Grammar (41)
1955	Auckland Grammar (42) / King's College (10)
1956	King's College (11)
1957	Otahuhu College
1958	Auckland Grammar (43)
1959	King's College (12)
1960	Mount Albert Grammar (9)
1961	Auckland Grammar (44)
1962	Mount Albert Grammar (10)
1963	Auckland Grammar (45) / King's College (13)
1964	Mount Albert Grammar (11)
1965	Sacred Heart College (6)
1966	Auckland Grammar (46)
1967	Auckland Grammar (47)
1968	Auckland Grammar and King's College joint winners(48)
1969	King's College (14) / Mount Albert Grammar (12) / St Paul's College (Ponsonby)
1970	Auckland Grammar (49)
1971	St Paul's College (Ponsonby) (2)
1972	St Paul's College (Ponsonby) (3)
1973	Mount Albert Grammar (13)
1974	Mount Albert Grammar (14)
1975	Auckland Grammar (50)
1976	Auckland Grammar (51)
1977	Kelston Boys High School
1978	Auckland Grammar (52) / St Paul's College (Ponsonby) (4)
1979	Auckland Grammar (53)
1980	Auckland Grammar (54)
1981	Auckland Grammar (55) / Mount Albert Grammar (15)
1982	Mount Albert Grammar (16)
1983	Kelston Boys High School (2)
1984	Kelston Boys High School (3)
1985	Mount Albert Grammar (17)
1986	Auckland Grammar (56)
1987	Kelston Boys High School (4) / St Peter's College
1988	Kelston Boys High School (5) / St Peter's College (2)
1989	Auckland Grammar (57)
1990	Auckland Grammar (58) / Mount Albert Grammar (18)
1991	Mount Albert Grammar (19)
1992	Kelston Boys High School (6) / Auckland Grammar (59)
1993	Kelston Boys High School (7) / Auckland Grammar (60)
1994	Kelston Boys High School (8)
1995	Kelston Boys High School (9)
1996	Kelston Boys High School (10)
1997	Otahuhu College (2)
1998	Kelston Boys High School (11)
1999	Auckland Grammar (61)
2000	St Peter's College (3)
2001	St Kentigern College
2002	Auckland Grammar (62)
2003	De La Salle College
2004	Auckland Grammar (63)
2005	King's College (15)
2006	Auckland Grammar (64)
2007	Mount Albert Grammar (20)
2008	De La Salle College (2)
2009	Mount Albert Grammar (21)
2010	Mount Albert Grammar (22)
2011	St Kentigern College (2)
2012	St Kentigern College (3)
2013	St Kentigern College (4)
2014	Auckland Grammar (65)
2015	St Kentigern College (5)
2016	Mount Albert Grammar (23)
2017	St Kentigern College (6)
2018	St Peter's College (4)
2019	King's College (16)
2020	Cancelled (COVID)
2021	Kelston Boys High School (12)
2022	Kelston Boys High School (13)
2023	Sacred Heart College (7)
2024	Kelston Boys High School (14)
2025	King's College (17)
2026	Kelston Boys High School (15)

== Summary Table ==
Teams	Titles	Outright	Shared	First Title	Last Title	National Titles	National Top 4 Appearances
Auckland Grammar	65	53	12	1895	2014	3	6
Mount Albert Grammar	23	18	5	1923	2016	3	5
King's College	17	11	6	1908	2025	0	2
Kelston Boys High School	15	11	4	1977	2026	5	7
Sacred Heart College	7	6	1	1906	2023	0	0
St Kentigern College	6	6	0	2001	2017	1	4
St Peter's College	4	2	2	1987	2018	3	3
St Paul's (Ponsonby)	4	2	2	1969	1978	0	0
De La Salle College	2	2	0	2003	2008	1	2
Otahuhu College	2	2	0	1957	1997	0	0
St John's College	2	2	0	1903	1904	0	0
Takapuna Grammar	1	0	1	1941	1941	0	0

- National First XV Championships started in 1982

== Competition rivalries ==
- Auckland Grammar vs King's College

The most famous rivalry in the competition is Auckland Grammar, based in Epsom against King's College, based in Otahuhu. The Rivalry dates back to 1896. As of the 2025 season the two teams have played 215 times with Auckland Grammar winning 136 times and King's winning 62 times along with 17 draws.

- Sacred Heart College vs St Peter's College

Another famous rivalry is Sacred Heart College, based in Glendowie against St Peter's College based in Epsom. This rivalry is noted because of the schools both being Catholic.

- Auckland Grammar vs Mount Albert Grammar

Auckland Grammar second biggest rivalry come against Mount Albert Grammar. The two schools are the most successful in the competition. The two schools played against each other in Mount Albert Grammar's centenary game.

=== Other notable rivalries ===
- Kelston Boy's High School vs Mount Albert Grammar
- Kelston Boy's High School vs De La Salle College
- Auckland Grammar vs St Peter's College
- King's College vs Otahuhu College
- St Kentigern College vs Auckland Grammar
- St Kentigern College vs King's College

== See also ==
- National First XV Championship (New Zealand)
