= Cooper Flanders =

New Zealand rugby union player (born 2003)

- Born: 31 August 2003 (age 23) Hastings, New Zealand
- Height: 187 cm (6 ft 2 in)
- Weight: 104 kg (229 lb; 16 st 5 lb)
- School: Hastings Boys' High School
- Notable relative: Devan Flanders (brother)

Rugby union career
- Position: Flanker / Number 8
- Current team: Hurricanes, Hawke's Bay
Senior career
Years	Team	Apps	(Points)
2024–	Hawke's Bay	17	(10)
2026–	Hurricanes	1	(0)
- Correct as of 20 July 2026
International career
Years	Team	Apps	(Points)
2023	New Zealand U20	4	(5)
- Correct as of 20 July 2026

Cooper Flanders (born 31 August 2003) is a New Zealand rugby union player, who plays for the Hurricanes and Hawke's Bay. His preferred position is flanker or number 8.

== Early career ==
Flanders was born in Hastings and attended Hastings Boys' High School where he played rugby for the first XV, originally as a halfback before converting to loose forward. His performances for the school earned him selection for the New Zealand Schools side in 2021. After leaving school he joined up with the Hurricanes academy, representing their U18 side in 2021, and U20 side in 2022. In 2023, he was selected for the New Zealand U20 side. He is the brother of fellow Hurricanes and Hawke's Bay player Devan Flanders.

== Professional career ==
Flanders has represented Hawke's Bay in the National Provincial Championship since 2024, being named in the squad for the 2025 Bunnings NPC. He was named in the Hurricanes wider training group for the 2026 Super Rugby Pacific season. He made his Super Rugby debut for the franchise on 29 May 2026 against the Crusaders, in their final game of the regular season.
