= Super 8 schools =

Association of boys' schools in New Zealand

Super 8 is the association of boys' schools in the central North Island of New Zealand. The association is mainly a sporting one, which was established in 1997 in response to the lack of competition that the schools faced in their home regions. The schools are some of the top sporting schools in New Zealand. Super 8 is the first high school competition in New Zealand to sign with a television company. Every week a Super 8 rugby match will be chosen and streamed on Maori Television, along with various other sporting finals.

== Schools ==
- Gisborne Boys' High School
- Hamilton Boys' High School
- Hastings Boys' High School
- Napier Boys' High School
- New Plymouth Boys' High School
- Palmerston North Boys' High School
- Rotorua Boys' High School
- Tauranga Boys' College

== Major Competition winners ==
Rugby

Year	Winner	Runner up
1998	Rotorua	Palmerston North
1999	Tauranga	Napier
2000	Napier	Gisborne, New Plymouth and Rotorua tied
2001	Rotorua	Napier
2002	Napier	Hastings
2003	Napier	Rotorua
2004	Hastings	Napier
2005	Palmerston North	Hamilton
2006	Hamilton	Gisborne
2007	Hamilton	Tauranga
2008	Hamilton	Palmerston North and Rotorua tied
2009	Hamilton	Tauranga
2010	Hamilton	Gisborne
2011	Gisborne	Palmerston North
2012	Hamilton	Napier
2013	Hamilton	Napier
2014	Hamilton	Palmerston North
2015	Hamilton	Rotorua
2016	Hastings	Hamilton
2017	Hastings/Hamilton	
2018	Hamilton	Napier
2019	Hamilton	Hastings
2020	Hamilton	Rotorua
2021	Hamilton	Hastings
2022	Rotorua	Hamilton
2023	Hamilton	Napier
2024	Tauranga	Hamilton
2025	Palmerston North	Rotorua
2026	Hamilton	Napier

Cricket

Year	Winner	Runner up
2002	Palmerston North	Hamilton
2003	Hamilton	Palmerston North
2004	Hamilton	Palmerston North
2005	Tauranga	New Plymouth
2006	Tauranga	New Plymouth
2007	Napier	New Plymouth
2008	Palmerston North	Hamilton
2009	Hamilton	Tauranga
2010	Hamilton	Tauranga
2011	Palmerston North	Hamilton
2012	Napier	Hamilton
2013	Hamilton	Palmerston North
2014	Hamilton	Palmerston North
2015	Hamilton	Palmerston North
2016	Hamilton	New Plymouth
2023	Tauranga	Palmerston North
2024	Palmerston North	Napier
2025	Napier	Tauranga

Football

Year	Winner	Runner up
1999	Tauranga	New Plymouth
2000	New Plymouth	Hamilton
2001	Tauranga	Hamilton
2002	Hamilton	New Plymouth
2003	Palmerston North	Hamilton
2004	Palmerston North	Napier
2005	Palmerston North	Hamilton
2006	Palmerston North	New Plymouth
2007	Tauranga	New Plymouth
2008	Napier	Palmerston North
2009	Palmerston North	Tauranga
2010	Hamilton	Palmerston North
2011	Palmerston North	Rotorua
2012	Palmerston North	Tauranga
2013	Hamilton	New Plymouth
2014	Hamilton	Palmerston North
2015	New Plymouth	Tauranga
2016	Hamilton	Palmerston North
2017	Napier	Hamilton
2018	Hamilton	Tauranga
2019	Tauranga	New Plymouth
2020	New Plymouth	Hamilton
2021	Tauranga	New Plymouth
2022	Tauranga	Hamilton
2023	Tauranga	Hamilton
2024	Hamilton	Tauranga
2025	Hamilton	Palmerston North
