= Dan Power =

US international rugby union player

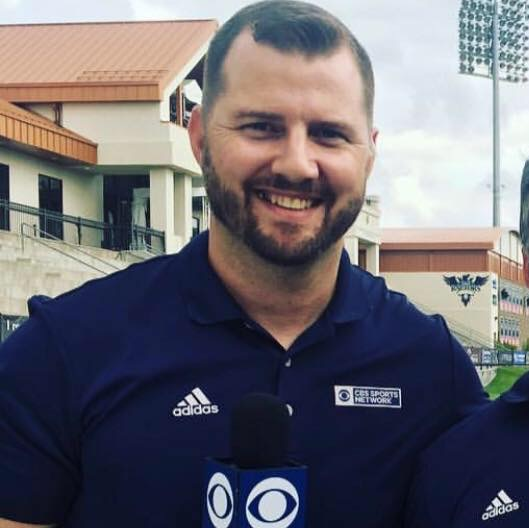
- Power calling the 2018 MLR Finals for CBS Sports at Infinity Park, Denver, Colorado
- Born: Daniel Power; 6 January 1982 (age 44) Brisbane, Australia
- Height: 6 ft 4 in (193 cm)
- Weight: 235 lb (107 kg)

Rugby union career
- Position: Fullback
Senior career
Years	Team	Apps	(Points)
	Carcassonne	22	(136)
–	New York AC		
International career
Years	Team	Apps	(Points)
2009	United States	12	(3)

Dan Power (born 6 January 1983) is an Australian-born American former rugby union player for the United States national rugby union team and current Rugby commentator.

== Playing career ==
Power was born in Brisbane, Australia. He attended Iona College, Brisbane, graduating in 1999. He was a member of AS Carcassonne in the French Elite 1 League before joining the New York Athletic Clubs (NYAC) Rugby team that plays in the American Rugby Super League (RSL). He finished the 2009 season as the second highest points scorer in the competition and a unanimous choice as the league's best fullback.

He debuted for the USA Eagles in 2009 against Argentina, and was in the player pool for the USA Eagles men's rugby team for the 2011 World Cup in New Zealand.

Power retired from rugby to attempt to pursue a career in the NFL as punter.

== Broadcasting career ==
Since 2012 he has been featured heavily as an on-air talent for both domestic and international rugby and has worked with ESPN, ESPNU, CBS Sports, Fox Sports, AOL, One World Sports, as well as a regular on The Rugby Channel. In 2016 Power was signed on as the voice of PRO Rugby and handled play by play duties for all television games, he was joined by a host of former USA Eagles including Louis Stanfill and Chad Erskine. The broadcasts were acclaimed domestically and internationally for their quality and professionalism and ushered in a new era for Rugby on television in America. In 2018 with the launch of Major League Rugby Power joined a group of commentators to call games on CBS Sports, ESPN+ and the AT&T Networks. Power was quickly promoted to the first choice caller for CBS Sports and called the majority of games for CBS including the Semi Finals and Championship game, making him the first commentator to call a professional rugby championship in America
