= Neville Black (disambiguation) =

Neville Black may refer to:

- Neville Black (1925–2016), New Zealand rugby union and rugby league player
- Neville Black (footballer) (1931-2004), English footballer, see List of Rochdale A.F.C. players (25–99 appearances)
