= Anaru Paenga-Morgan =

New Zealand rugby union player

- Born: 26 January 2003 (age 23) Hamilton, New Zealand
- Height: 186 cm (6 ft 1 in)
- Weight: 101 kg (223 lb; 15 st 13 lb)
- School: St Paul's Collegiate School

Rugby union career
- Position: Midfielder
- Current team: Hurricanes, Hawke's Bay
Senior career
Years	Team	Apps	(Points)
2025–	Hawke's Bay	8	(5)
2026–	Hurricanes		
- Correct as of 19 November 2025

Anaru Paenga-Morgan (born 26 January 2003) is a New Zealand rugby union player, who plays for the Hurricanes and Hawke's Bay. His preferred position is midfield.

== Early career ==
Paenga-Morgan was born in Hamilton and first attended Gisborne Boys' High School before attending St Paul's Collegiate School, where he earned selection for the Chiefs junior sides. At school, he was a successful paddler, winning gold in the W1 paddling. After representing the Chiefs at junior level, he moved to represent the Crusaders at U20 level in 2023. He represented the New Zealand Heartland XV in 2024.

== Professional career ==
Paenga-Morgan has represented Hawke's Bay in the National Provincial Championship since 2025, being named in the squad for the 2025 Bunnings NPC. He was named in the Hurricanes wider training group for the 2026 Super Rugby Pacific season.
