= Neil Waka =

New Zealand broadcaster and journalist

Neil Waka is a New Zealand broadcaster and journalist.

== Education and media career ==
After graduating from Rotorua Boys' High School, he began his media career in radio as a news and current affairs journalist before moving into television. Waka helped establish and was the first presenter in New Zealand of TV3's Nightline presenting and reporting for Nightline for three years. Waka also presented his own sports show for three years, Wynns Sport Sunday while also hosting New Zealand's first NBA show before becoming the official weekend news reader. He presented multiple programmes at TV3 including current affairs show Inside New Zealand and was the official news presenter and reporter trainer for four years. In 2000 Waka joined the TVNZ breakfast team with Mike Hosking and Kate Hawkesby as news reader, becoming the Late News presenter the following year, before joining Judy Bailey at 6pm News 12 months later, staying there for five years. Waka also developed and presented the first weekday 4:30pm news bulletins on One News for TVNZ, for almost two years from 2007.

== Corporate career ==
In 2010 Waka resigned from his television roles and moved into public relations. He took on a corporate role with global organisation General Motors Holden New Zealand for five years before moving to Coca-Cola Amatil New Zealand as head of corporate affairs for New Zealand and Fiji.

== Return to journalism ==
Waka returned to New Zealand television as a guest sports news presenter for Newshub's AM Show prior to Christmas 2019, and the following year he took a broadcasting role at Māori Television presenting the current affair programme Te Ao Tapatahi, which he held until December 2023.

== Controversies ==
In 2025 Waka joined a controversial trip to Israel which was reportedly funded by Israel’s Ministry of Foreign Affairs. Maui Solomon, who declined an invitation to join the trip, believed the trips were an attempt by "the State of Israel to say they have the support of indigenous peoples around the world, and therefore they are also indigenous".

In 2026 Newsroom reported that 'TV news host-turned-PR consultant Neil Waka' attended a gathering hosted by billionaire patriarch Harry Mowbray to celebrate a vote-splitting strategy designed to push New Zealand politics to the right.

== See also ==
- List of New Zealand television personalities
