= Paul Simonsson =

New Zealand international rugby union & league player

- Born: Paul Lennart James Simonsson; 16 February 1967 (age 59) Tauranga, New Zealand
- Height: 1.86 m (6 ft 1 in)
- Weight: 86 kg (190 lb)
- School: Tauranga Boys' College

Rugby union career
- Position: Wing
Provincial / State sides
Years	Team	Apps	(Points)
1986, 1988–89	Waikato	29	
1987	Wellington	4	
1996	New South Wales		
International career
Years	Team	Apps	(Points)
1987	New Zealand	0	(0)
1988–89	New Zealand Māori		
National sevens team
Years	Team		Comps
1996	Australia		1
- Rugby league career

Playing information
- Position: Wing
Club
Years	Team	Pld	T	G	FG	P
1991–92	North Sydney	3				0

Paul Lennart James Simonsson (born 16 February 1967) is a New Zealand former rugby union and rugby league player. A wing, Simonsson represented Waikato and Wellington in rugby union at a provincial level, and was a member of the New Zealand national side, the All Blacks, on their 1987 tour of Japan. He played two matches for the All Blacks, scoring seven tries, but did not play any test matches.

Simonsson switched codes to rugby league in 1990, but his career was curtailed by injury. He played only three NSWRL matches, two from the bench, for North Sydney Bears in 1991 and 1992. He subsequently returned to rugby union in 1995, and played for New South Wales and the Australian Sevens team in 1996 before injury forced his retirement.

Simonsson worked as a police detective in New South Wales, having first joined the New Zealand Police in 1987. He was later a tax investigator for the Australian Taxation Office and worked at the Australian Department of Climate Change. He is currently the head of intelligence at the Australian Sports Anti-Doping Authority.
