= Joshua Smith (rugby union) =

New Zealand professional rugby union player

- Born: 12 September 2004 (age 22) New Zealand
- Height: 188 cm (6 ft 2 in)
- Weight: 110 kg (243 lb; 17 st 5 lb)
- School: St Peter's College

Rugby union career
- Position: Prop
- Current team: Force, Hawke's Bay
Senior career
Years	Team	Apps	(Points)
2024–	Hawke's Bay	5	(0)
2025–	Force	6	(0)
- Correct as of 5 November 2025
International career
Years	Team	Apps	(Points)
2024	New Zealand U20	8	(5)
- Correct as of 22 February 2025

Joshua Smith (born 12 September 2004) is a New Zealand rugby player, who plays as a prop for the Force in Super Rugby and Hawke's Bay in New Zealand's domestic National Provincial Championship competition.

== Early career ==
Smith attended St Peter's College, Auckland where he played in the St Peter’s College first XV. Smith played his club rugby for Hastings RFC. He came through the Hawke's Bay academy and represented the Hurricanes at Under 20 level. He was named in the New Zealand U20 squad in 2024.

== Professional career ==
Smith has represented Hawke's Bay in the National Provincial Championship since 2024, being named in their squad for the 2024 Bunnings NPC. In 2025 he signed a training contract with the Force. He made his Force debut as a late inclusion in their side for the Round 2 fixture against the Brumbies during the 2025 Super Rugby Pacific season.
