= Neville Thornton (rugby union) =

New Zealand rugby union footballer (1918–1998)

- Born: Neville Henry Thornton; 12 December 1918 Ōtāhuhu, New Zealand
- Died: 12 September 1998 (aged 79) Auckland, New Zealand
- Height: 1.86 m (6 ft 1 in)
- Weight: 93 kg (205 lb)
- School: Otahuhu College
- University: Auckland University College
- Occupation: School principal

Rugby union career
- Position: Number 8
Provincial / State sides
Years	Team	Apps	(Points)
1940	King Country	3	
1947–1948	Auckland	11	
International career
Years	Team	Apps	(Points)
1947–1949	New Zealand	3	(3)

Neville Henry Thornton (12 December 1918 – 12 September 1998) was a New Zealand rugby union player. A number eight, Thornton represented King Country and Auckland at a provincial level, and was a member of the New Zealand national side, the All Blacks, in 1947 and 1949. He played 19 matches for the All Blacks including three internationals.

During World War II, Thornton served with the 2nd New Zealand Expeditionary Force (NZEF), and in February 1945 he was commissioned as a second lieutenant in the New Zealand Infantry. Following the end of the war, he toured Britain and France with the NZEF rugby team, known as the "Kiwis", playing in 18 matches and scoring nine tries. After returning to New Zealand, Thornton studied at Auckland University College, graduating with a Bachelor of Arts degree in 1951 and a Master of Arts degree in 1959. A schoolteacher, Thornton was principal of Rotorua Boys' High School from 1960 to 1962, and then Papakura High School until 1977.
