= Stuart Conn =

- Born: Stuart Bruce Conn; 11 March 1953 (age 73) Whakatāne, New Zealand
- Height: 1.91 m (6 ft 3 in)
- Weight: 94 kg (207 lb)
- School: Tauranga Boys' College

Rugby union career
- Position: Flanker
Provincial / State sides
Years	Team	Apps	(Points)
1973–81	Auckland	63	
1982	Hawke's Bay	1	
International career
Years	Team	Apps	(Points)
1976, 1980	New Zealand	0	(0)

Stuart Bruce Conn (born 11 March 1953) is a former New Zealand rugby union player and a sworn officer of the New Zealand Police. Primarily a flanker but also a number 8 and lock, Conn played his club rugby for Grammar Old Boys and represented Auckland and, briefly, Hawke's Bay at a provincial level. Conn was a member of the New Zealand national side, the All Blacks, in 1976 and 1980. He played six games for the All Blacks but did not appear in any test matches.
