= Robert Eastham =

New Zealand sport shooter

Personal information
- Nationality: New Zealand
- Born: 1 February 1989 (age 37) Balclutha, New Zealand
- Height: 1.95 m (6 ft 5 in)
- Weight: 100 kg (220 lb)

Sport
- Sport: Shooting
- Event: 50 m rifle prone (FR60PR)

Robert Eastham (born 1 February 1989 in Balclutha) is a New Zealand sport shooter. Eastham represented New Zealand at the 2008 Summer Olympics in Beijing, where he competed in the men's 50 m rifle prone. He finished in fourteenth place, just one point behind Russia's Artem Khadjibekov, with a total score of 594 targets after the fifth attempt.

After graduating from Rotorua Boys' High School, Eastham studied Earth Science at Massey University before joining the New Zealand Police. He graduated from police college in December 2013.
