= Hawke's Bay (National Provincial Championship) =

New Zealand rugby union team, based in Napier

- Official Hawke's Bay Magpies emblem
- Union: Hawke's Bay Rugby Union
- Nickname: Magpies
- Founded: 1884; 142 years ago
- Location: Poraiti, Napier, New Zealand
- Ground: McLean Park (Capacity: 19,700)
- Coach: Brock James
- Captain(s): Jacob Devery; Frank Lochore
- Most appearances: Orcades Crawford and Michael Johnson (137)
- Top scorer: Jarrod Cunningham (1,380)
- Most tries: Robbie Hunter (69)
- League: National Provincial Championship
- 2026: 6th Quarter-finalist
Team kit

Official website
- www.sporty.co.nz/magpies

Hawke's Bay (often known as the Hawke's Bay Magpies) are a New Zealand professional rugby union team based in Napier, New Zealand. The union was originally established in 1884, with the National Provincial Championship established in 1976. They now play in the reformed National Provincial Championship competition. They play their home games at McLean Park in Napier in the Hawke's Bay region. The team is affiliated with the Hurricanes Super Rugby franchise. Their home playing colours are black and white.

== Current squad ==
The Hawke's Bay Magpies squad for the 2026 Hilux NPC season is:

2026 Hawke's Bay squad
**Props**: (Tonga) **Joe Apikotoa**; (France) Clément Castets; (Samoa) **Lolani Faleiva**; (New Zealand) Manahi Goulton; (New Zealand) Hadlee Hay-Horton; (New Zealand) Nik Patumaka; (New Zealand) Joshua Smith; **Hookers**: (New Zealand) Jacob Devery **(cc)**; (New Zealand) Kianu Kereru-Symes; (New Zealand) Valentino Taito ^{DEV} (Note: Taito wasn't named in the original Hawke’s Bay squad, but was named in the side for Round 4.); (New Zealand) Tyrone Thompson; **Locks**: (New Zealand) Tom Allen; (New Zealand) Geoff Cridge; (New Zealand) Hunter Morrison; (New Zealand) Zach Taulapapa	**Loose forwards**: (New Zealand) Tiaki Fabish; (New Zealand) Cooper Flanders; (New Zealand) Frank Lochore **(cc)**; (New Zealand) Patrick Mauga; (Fiji) **Vilive Miramira**; (New Zealand) Hugh Renton; (New Zealand) Sam Smith; (New Zealand) Liam Udy-Johns; **Halfbacks (scrum-halves)**: (New Zealand) **Folau Fakatava**; (New Zealand) Kade Manuel; (New Zealand) Connor McLeod; **First five-eighths (fly-halves)**: (New Zealand) Will Cole; (New Zealand) Harry Godfrey; (New Zealand) Lincoln McClutchie	**Midfielders (centres)**: (New Zealand) Bryson Ioane; (New Zealand) Anaru Paenga-Morgan; (Australia) Lukas Ripley; (New Zealand) Bailyn Sullivan; **Outside backs**: (Canada) **Nic Benn**; (Samoa) **Neria Fomai**; (Australia) **Darby Lancaster**; (New Zealand) Jonah Lowe; (New Zealand) Kere Penitito; (New Zealand) Zarn Sullivan; (Tonga) Andrew Tauatevalu
(cc) denotes co-captain. **Bold** denotes internationally capped players.^{DEV} denotes a development squad member. Source:

== Honours ==
Hawke's Bay have never been overall Champions. Their full list of honours, though, include:

National Provincial Championship Second Division North Island

- Winners: 1979.

National Provincial Championship Second Division

- Winners: 1988, 1990, 2001, 2002, 2003, 2005.

ITM Cup Championship Division

- Winners: 2011, 2015.

Mitre 10 Cup Championship Division

- Winners: 2020.

== Current Super Rugby players ==
Players named in the 2025 Hawke's Bay Magpies squad, who also earned contracts or were named in a squad for any side participating in the 2025 Super Rugby Pacific season:

Player	Team
Jacob Devery	Hurricanes
Ere Enari	Hurricanes
Miracle Faiʻilagi	Moana Pasifika
Folau Fakatava	Highlanders
Devan Flanders	Hurricanes
Neria Fomai	Moana Pasifika
Harry Godfrey	Hurricanes
Jonah Lowe	Highlanders
Pouri Rakete-Stones	Hurricanes
Hugh Renton	Highlanders
Lukas Ripley	Waratahs
Joshua Smith	Force
Zarn Sullivan	Blues
Isaia Walker-Leawere	Hurricanes
