= Neville Black =

New Zealand international rugby union and league player

- Born: Neville Wyatt Black; 25 April 1925 Kawakawa, New Zealand
- Died: 24 January 2016 (aged 90) Rotorua, New Zealand
- Height: 1.69 m (5 ft 7 in)
- Weight: 70 kg (150 lb)
- School: Rotorua Boys' High School
- Occupation(s): Wool classer Garage proprietor

Rugby union career
- Position(s): First five-eighth Halfback
Provincial / State sides
Years	Team	Apps	(Points)
1948–51	Auckland		
International career
Years	Team	Apps	(Points)
1949	New Zealand	1	(0)
- Rugby league career

Playing information
- Position: Stand-off
Club
Years	Team	Pld	T	G	FG	P
1951–53	Wigan
1953–56	Keighley
1957–60	Ngongotaha
	Total	0	0	0	0	0
Representative
Years	Team	Pld	T	G	FG	P
1953	Other Nationalities

Neville Wyatt Black (25 April 1925 – 24 January 2016) was a New Zealand rugby union and rugby league player who represented New Zealand in rugby union.

== Rugby union career ==
A rugby union first five-eighth, Black played for Ponsonby RFC. He represented Auckland at a provincial level, and was a member of the New Zealand national side, the All Blacks, on their 1949 tour of South Africa. He played 10 matches for the All Blacks on that tour, three of them at halfback, including one international.

== Rugby league career ==
In 1951 he switched codes, signing for Wigan. He made his début on 22 December 1951. He later also played three matches for the Other Nationalities side in the European Rugby League Championship.

In 1953 he, along with four other Wigan players, signed with Keighley.

He returned to New Zealand in 1957 and played for the Ngongotaha club.

== Later years ==
Black died in Rotorua on 24 January 2016.
