= The Rugby Channel =

New Zealand TV channel

- Country: New Zealand

Programming
- Picture format: 16:9 (SDTV)

Ownership
- Owner: Sky Network Television

History
- Launched: 1 May 2002
- Closed: 31 July 2019

Links
- Website: www.skysport.co.nz

The Rugby Channel was New Zealand's only channel dedicated to the national sport of rugby union. When live matches were not on, the channel screened classic games and documentaries relating to the sport. It was the only channel committed to showing all major matches in the widescreen 16:9 ratio popular with newer television sets, but from August 2008 Sky Sport changed to widescreen as well after My Sky HDi was launched. However, Rugby Channel viewers could exclusively watch the press conferences following major rugby matches, and could watch most major European rugby games as well. It also screened live and exclusive college 1st XV matches then replayed on Sky Sport later in the week.

== History ==
The Rugby Channel officially launched in New Zealand on May 1, 2002, as a dedicated 24/7 pay-TV network on Sky on Sky Channel 15. Programming kicked off with a BBC documentary on the history of the sport, alongside panel shows, Super 12 replays, and historic All Blacks matches.

At launch, the channel struggled with broadcast approvals for pre-1995 games, which required ongoing negotiations with the NZRU and the International Rugby Board.

== Closure ==
The Rugby Channel closed on 31 July 2019. From 1 August 2019, all of The Rugby Channel's programming was moved to Sky Sport 1, making Sky Sport 1 a 24/7 rugby channel. The final program aired on The Rugby Channel was a documentary, Greats of Super Rugby: Christian Cullen.
