= Rotorua Boys' High School =

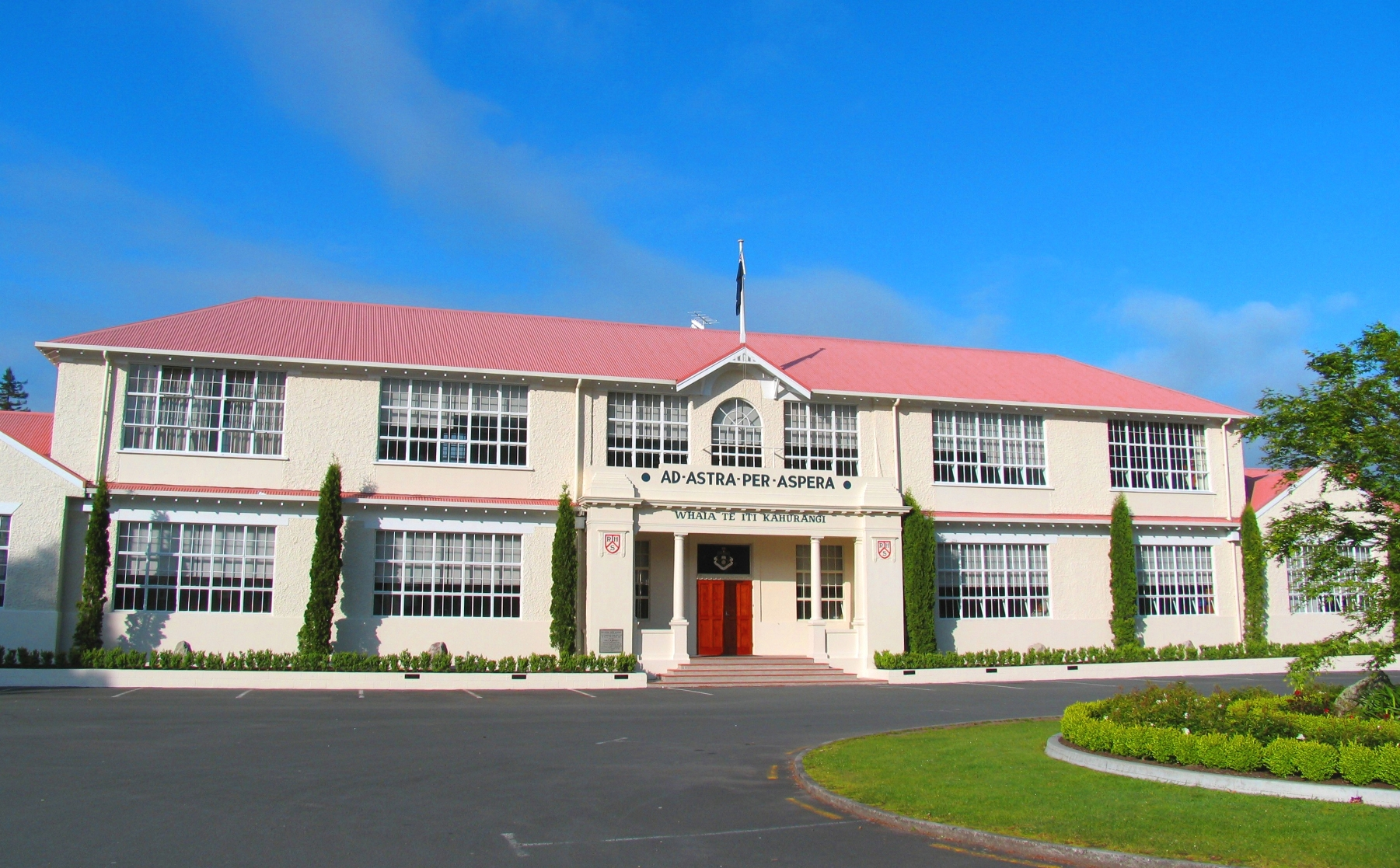

Location
- Pukuatua Street; Rotorua; New Zealand; 38°8′19.59″S 176°14′17.25″E

Information
- Type: State single-sex secondary
- Motto: Latin: Ad Astra Per Aspera; Māori: Whaia Te Iti Kahurangi ("To the stars through hard work." "Search for great things.")
- Established: 1927
- Ministry of Education Institution no.: 152
- Principal: John Kendal
- Years offered: 9–13
- Gender: Male
- Enrolment: 1,153 (July 2026)
- Houses: Ngongotahā; Te Akitu a Raukura; Te Rotoruanui-a-Kahu; Utuhina
- Colours: Red and Blue
- Song: Rotorua Boys High School Song
- Nickname: Raukura
- Socio-economic decile: 3G
- Website: rbhs.school.nz

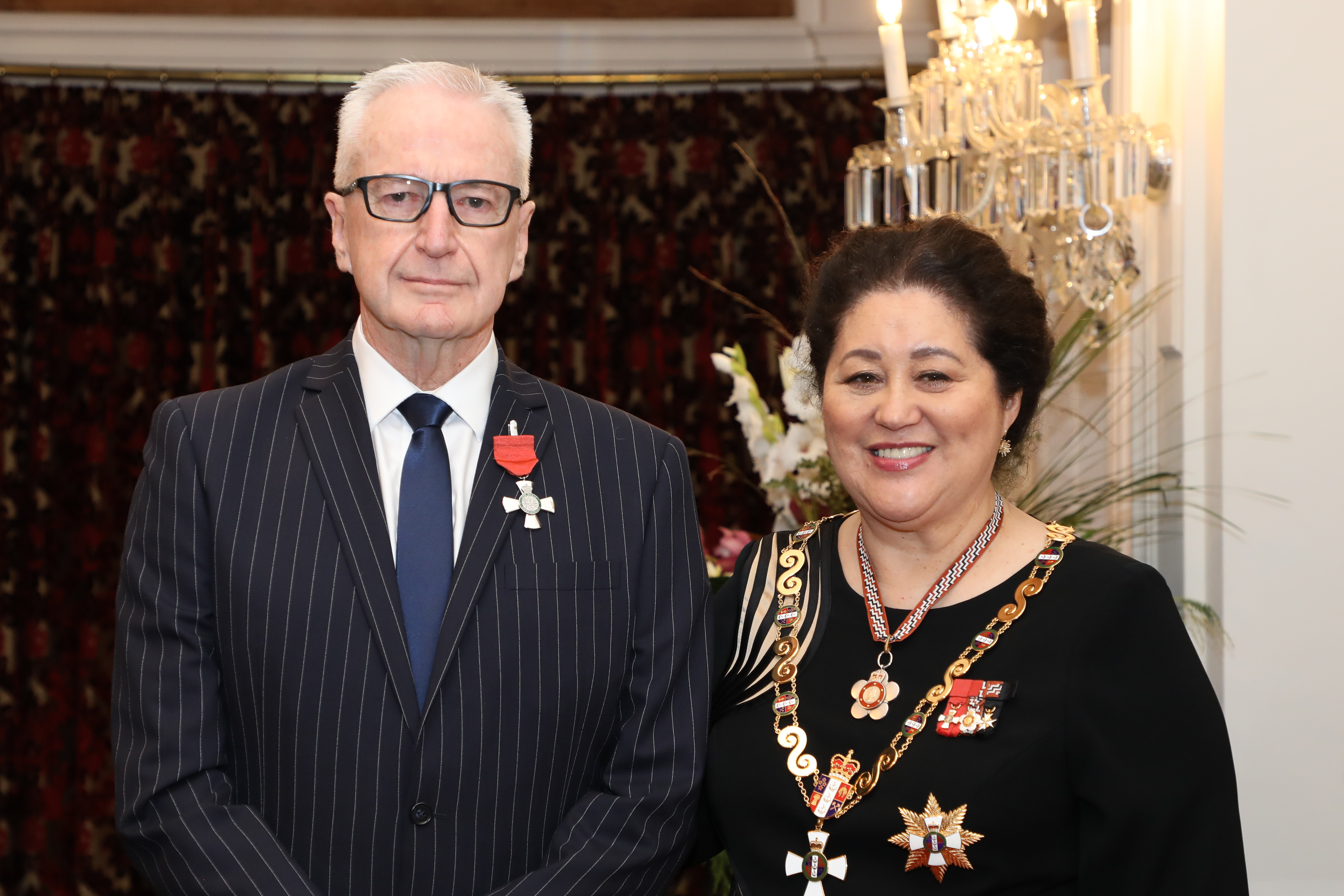
From left: RBHS Principal Chris Grinter (retired 2024) after his investiture as MNZM by the Governor-General of New Zealand, Dame Cindy Kiro (right) at Government House, Wellington on 26 May 2023.

Rotorua Boys' High School (RBHS) is a state school educating boys from Year 9 to Year 13. It is situated just outside the Rotorua CBD at the intersection of Old Taupo Road and Pukuatua Street in Rotorua, New Zealand. The school is governed by an elected School Board, of which the Principal is ex officio a member under guidelines laid down by the New Zealand Ministry of Education. With Māori enrolment exceeding 75% of the school’s intake, the largest per capita in New Zealand, RBHS has been a longstanding recipient of funding from its Ngāti Whakaue endowment that assisted the construction of the school’s 104-bed hostel, and the purchase of a computer laboratory. RBHS is noted for its performance in sport, with 4 Olympians among its notable alumni, and for having won the Prime Minister of New Zealand Supreme Award for Excellence in Education and the Excellence in Leading Award, making it the top school in the country for 2019. Its retiring principal, Chris Grinter, was the longest serving in the school's history, and in 2022, he was appointed a Member of the New Zealand Order of Merit for services to education and Māori.

== History ==
Rotorua Boys' High School had its beginnings as the Rotorua High and Grammar School, founded in 1927 to replace the earlier Rotorua District High School (1914–1926). By 1956 it had a roll in excess of 1200 students. Revenues for the school came from land gifted by the Ngāti Whakaue people for the Town of Rotorua in 1880 under the Fenton Agreement.

The Intermediate Department was closed when Rotorua Intermediate School was established in 1957. The Rotorua High School was further split to make room for a growing population of the district and its educational needs when, in 1959 Rotorua Girls' High School was opened. Rotorua High School was then established as Rotorua Boys' High School and commenced to function as a state secondary school for boys with a roll of 640 pupils in February 1959.

Two memorial honours boards titled Pro Patria 1939–1945 Non Omnis Moriar either side of the stage in the school’s assembly hall commemorate 61 RBHS veterans who died in World War 2 military service. Also listed on the second board are two from the Vietnam War and one for World War 1. A photograph of each is placed next to their name. Another honours board lists War Orders, Decorations and Medals bestowed on 17 veterans from the school.

In the 1980s, RBHS was an early adopter of computer technology both in its central administration and in delivery of classroom teaching via the government-backed Poly-1. Funds for the purchases came from the Ngāti Whakaue grant. In 2020, the school was accredited by Apple Computer with 'Apple Distinguished School' status, which is awarded to schools that demonstrate "leadership, educational excellence and a vision for learning with technology".

In 2011, the Head of Biology at the school, Dr Angela Sharples, won the Prime Minister's Science Teacher's Prize "as recognition for her outstanding teaching". Sharples rewrote senior biology courses at RBHS, and as winner of the PM's Science Prize, she received $50,000 reward, and a further $100,000 for her school. She also established, and was a director of Rotorua Boys’ High School’s Accelerate and Curriculum Enrichment (ACE) programme. Her initiatives reversed the decline in the number of students studying biology at the school, with Māori students’ results between 10 and 20 percent higher than the national average. Since 2006, Sharples has been Chair of the New Zealand International Biology Olympiad.

In 2016, 13 students from RBHS, a record thitherto for the school, including 6 students in Physical Education, gained a New Zealand Scholarship, placing them in the top 3 per cent of the country.

The boys’ and girls’ high schools have collaborated on debates, plays and musical productions, such as Midsummer Night’s Dream in 2019, and In The Heights in 2022. Every year, the two schools combine as 'Raukura', a Māori performing arts group competing on a regional and national level. In 2016, a touring group of 51 students and teachers (including 46 performers) from Rotorua Boys' and Girls' High Schools toured for 16 days, showcasing Māori culture in Portugal.

In 2019, Rotorua Boys' High School won the Prime Minister of New Zealand Supreme Award for Excellence in Education, at the same time winning Excellence in Leading Award, making it the top school in the country for that year. The school received a combined prize worth $59,000 along with professional development opportunities and representation at an international education event. RBHS was also named Finalist, Excellence in Teaching & Learning Award.

In the 2022 New Year Honours, the school's (now retired) principal Chris Grinter was appointed a member of the New Zealand Order of Merit "for services to education and Māori after spending the 'vast majority' of his career dedicated to schools with high Māori populations". According to Grinter, Māori make up more than 75% of the school’s 1,153 students. 'That means Rotorua Boys’ High educates "more high school-aged Māori boys than any other school in New Zealand".'

In December 2022, the CEO of the New Zealand Māori Tourism board pledged $10,000 to the Lion Foundation’s Raukura Rangatahi Fund as part of the Young Enterprise Scheme established to allow students to set up and run a real business. Two RBHS students had started 'Coffee Direct' in 2021 to serve teachers, support staff and students at the school, with customers ordering through a New Zealand-owned app called “On The Go”. The student business won the National Excellence Award for Rangatahi Entrepreneur and the Chartered Accountants Australia and New Zealand Award for Best Annual Review at the Young Enterprise Scheme National Awards 2022 at Te Papa Museum in Wellington.

Two books about Rotorua Boys' High School's history by archivist Kevin Lyall have been published, the first in 2003 and the second to mark the school’s 2014 centenary.

=== Principals ===
Rotorua District High School

- John Warn (1914–1915)
- Francis Wood (1915–1919)
- Thomas Tanner (1916–1918) (While Wood was serving in World War I)
- William Lewins (1920–1926)
- George Barber (1926)

Rotorua High and Grammar School

- Aby Ryder (1927–1931)
- Bill Harwood (1932–1959)

Rotorua Boys' High School

- Neville Thornton (1960–1962)
- Ted Hamill (1963–1979)
- Geoffrey Cramond (1980–1991)
- Chris Grinter (1991–2024)
- Rie Morris (acting, 2024)
- John Kendal (2025–present)

== Enrolment ==
As of July 2026, Rotorua Boys' High School has roll of 1,153 students, of which 773 (67.0%) identify as Māori.

As of 2026, the school has an Equity Index of 504, placing it amongst schools whose students have many socioeconomic barriers to achievement (roughly equivalent to deciles 2 and 3 under the former socio-economic decile system).

== Houses ==
From 1927 till 2020, Rotorua Boys' High School's four houses were known as Drake, Frobisher, Nelson and Raleigh, after renowned British explorers and seafarers. At the end of 2020, in a climate influenced by the American Black Lives Matter movement, and supported by evidence that each of the four British namesakes had varying levels of involvement with slavery, the houses were given new names. These new names, which were also felt to be more relevant to the pupils of today, came into effect at the beginning of 2021:

Ngongotaha – red, formerly known as Drake
Te Akitu a Raukura – yellow, formerly known as Frobisher
Te Rotoruanui-a-Kahu – blue, formerly known as Nelson
Utuhina – green, formerly known as Raleigh

== Curriculum ==
The school requires students in Years 9 and 10 to take seven core courses for the year, in addition to ten short courses. In Year 11, there are four compulsory subjects, with English being the only compulsory subject in Year 12. Year 13 subjects are all electable.

CORE COURSES	Year 9	Year 10	Year 11	Year 12	Year 13
English	•	•	•	•	None
Te Reo Māori	•	•	•		None
Mathematics	•	•	•		None
Science	•	•	•		None
Social Studies	•	•			None
Physical Education	•	•			None
Health	•	•			None

=== Year 9 ===
In addition to Core Curriculum, students receive instruction in ten short courses: Art, Chinese, Dance, Designing Digital Outcomes, Digital Technology, Health, Leadership, Music, Outdoor Education, Raukura Performing Arts, Technology, and Tourism.

=== Year 10 ===
In addition to Core Curriculum, students are allowed to choose either three courses, or two courses and one academy class from the following options:

- Business Studies
- Dance
- Design and Visual Communication
- Digital Technology
- Food Technology
- Māori Carving
- Music
- Outdoor Education
- Technology
- Visual Art

=== Year 11 ===
In addition to compulsory English, students must also choose three additional subjects from the below table:

Art (Visual)	Building Construction	Business Studies
Dance	Design & Visual Communication	
Digital Technology	Drama	Engineering Technology
Food and Hospitality	Geography	Health Education
History	Māori Carving	Māori Performing Arts
Materials Fabrication Technology	Music	Outdoor Education
Pasifika Arts Studies	Physical Education	Sports Academy

=== Year 12 ===
Students choose four additional subjects alongside their English course from the below table:

Art (Visual)	Biology	Building Construction
Building Trades Academy (Fulltime)	Business Studies	Chemistry
Dance	Design & Visual Communication	
Digital Technologies	Drama	Engineering Technology
Food and Hospitality	Geography	History
Māori Carving	Māori Performing Arts	Materials Fabrication Technology
Mathematics	Music	Outdoor Education
Pasifika Studies	Physical Education	Physics
Science	Small Business Accounting	Sports Academy
Te Reo Māori		

=== Year 13 ===
Students select five options from the below table, with no compulsory subjects:

Art (Visual)	Biology	Building Construction
Building Trades Academy (Full week)	Business Studies	Chemistry
Dance	Design Visual Communication	
Digital Technologies	Drama	English
Engineering Academy (8 Hours)	Food and Hospitality	Geography
History	Māori Carving	Māori Performing Arts
Mathematics	Mathematics with Calculus	Music
Pasifika Studies	Physical Education	Physics
Police Studies	Outdoor Education	Small Business Accounting
Sports Academy	Te Reo Māori	Te Reo Rangatira
Tourism		

== Sport ==
Rotorua Boys' High School is well-known for its sports programme, particularly in rugby union, and has its own Rugby Field, Soccer Field, Cricket Ground, Basketball and Tennis Courts, and a Gymnasium, which are sometimes also hired to approved sporting bodies. Five 'sports academies' are offered to students:

- Basketball
- Football
- Golf
- Hockey
- Rugby

The school’s own geothermal swimming pool, built in 1954, closed in the early 1990s in compliance with government forced bore closures across Rotorua. The new Science Block, built at a cost of $5.5 million now occupies the area where the pool once stood. Following a stint at the Blue Baths, RBHS Swimming Sports moved to the Aquatic Centre in 1994. From November 2022, the Aquatic Centre was closed for renovations until 24 June 2024.

Four RBHS old boys competed in the Beijing Olympics: kayaker Mike Walker, shooter Robbie Eastham, footballer Sam Messam and cyclist Sam Bewley. Following the Olympics in 2009, the athletes were honoured with a whole-school haka.

== Hostel ==
In 2005, Rotorua Boys' High School officially opened the Tai Mitchell Hostel, an onsite boarding facility, at a cost of $3.5 million. Named after the former Chair of the Te Arawa District Maori Council and Chair of the Arawa Trust Board, Tai Mitchell, the facility is designed to accommodate 104 students, roughly 10 percent of the school roll.

== Education Department review ==
In 2009, the New Zealand Ministry of Education appointed a limited statutory manager Dennis Finn to investigate allegations of mismanagement, inappropriate drug-testing and financial issues regarding the school's Hostel. Despite vehement protests from parents, following his investigation, Finn found that the school had no case to answer, and the boys who had been suspended were subsequently reinstated, with "letters of explanation".

In October 2022, the New Zealand Education Review Office published a Profile Report on Rotorua Boys' High School. Among his findings, the review director Phil Cowie wrote that RBHS had in place “a well-established, collaborative and robust school-wide evaluation process, highly effective leadership across all areas of the school, well-established educationally powerful connections, communication and relationships, and with Māori whānau, hapū, iwi and parents, families and communities, to support student learning and outcomes,” and that the school had addressed equity concerns and academic outcomes to provide a strong and positive base for initiatives. The report made recommendations concerning NCEA implementation on “corequisites around literacy and numeracy, and building a strong base for common assessment activities; continuing a focus on the wellbeing of students and staff based on Te Tiriti o Waitangi and partnerships with whānau and parents and creating a pathway for Tikanga Māori to be added as a core subject for all Year 12 ākonga in 2023.”

== Notable alumni ==
=== The arts and journalism ===
- Alan Duff MBE – author
- Max Hohepa – Herbs (band) member
- Sir Howard Morrison OBE – musician
- Neil Waka – TVNZ presenter
- Jordi Webber – member of boy band Titanium

=== Business ===
- Neville Crichton CNZM – entrepreneur, touring car racer, and ocean-race sailor

=== Politics and public service ===
- Percy Allen QSO – National Party politician
- Ray Boord – Labour Party politician
- Heta Hingston QSO – former lawyer and jurist
- Jim Traue ONZM – former Chief Librarian of the Alexander Turnbull Library

=== Sport ===
- Israel Adesanya – mixed martial artist in the Ultimate Fighting Championship, former UFC Middleweight Champion
- Trevor Berghan – rugby union player (All Blacks)
- Sam Bewley – cyclist, team pursuit (Beijing Olympics 2008)
- Neville Black – rugby union (All Blacks) and rugby league player (Wigan)
- Kevin Blackwell – road and track cyclist (Edmonton Commonwealth Games 1978)
- Garrick Cowley – rugby union player (Manu Samoa)
- Mike Delany – rugby union player (All Blacks)
- Tom Donnelly – rugby union player (All Blacks)
- Robbie Eastham – shooter (Beijing Olympics 2008)
- Jonty Farmer – sailor, Finn class (Mexico City Olympics 1968 and Montreal Olympics 1976)
- Siegfried Fisi'ihoi – rugby union player (Tonga)
- Kelly Haimona – rugby union player (Bay of Plenty, Lyons Piacenza, Calvisano, Zebre, and Italy)
- Teimana Harrison – rugby union player (Northampton Saints and England)
- Dylan Hartley – rugby union player (Northampton Saints and England)
- Danny Lee – golfer
- Adam McGeorge – footballer (All Whites, Oly-Whites 2012)
- Alan McNaughton – rugby union player (All Blacks and Bay of Plenty)
- Liam Messam – rugby union player (All Blacks, Waikato, Chiefs, gold medalist in rugby sevens at Melbourne 2006 and Dehli 2010 Commonwealth Games)
- Sam Messam – footballer (Beijing Olympics 2008)
- Craig Newby – rugby union player (All Blacks, Otago, North Harbour, Highlanders, Leicester Tigers, 7’s World Cup winner, 7’s Manchester Commonwealth games Gold medal winner)
- Willie Ripia – rugby union player (Highlanders, Hurricanes, Taranaki and Western Force)
- Ben Sandford – skeleton sledder and Winter Olympian
- Arthur Stone – rugby union player (All Blacks)
- Te Toiroa Tahuriorangi – rugby union player (All Blacks)
- Isaac Te Aute – rugby union player (New Zealand Sevens)
- Latu Vaeno – Tongan-born rugby union player (All Blacks)
- Matt Vant Leven – rugby union player (Chiefs)
- Mike Walker – kayaker (Beijing Olympics 2008)
