= Tauranga Boys' College =

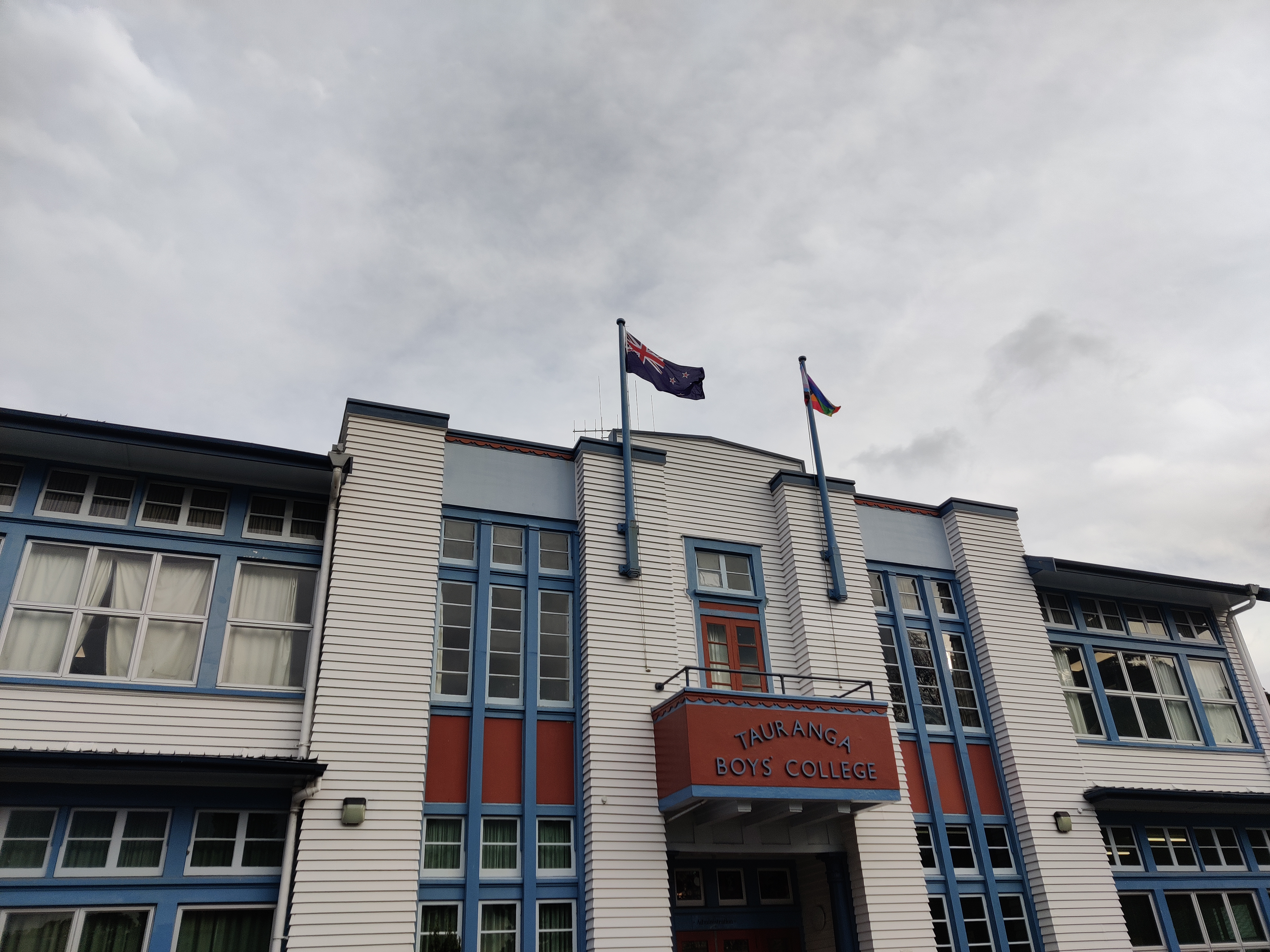
- The main college office block flying the New Zealand flag, and Pride flag as a part of the schools first pride week events

Location
- 664 Cameron Road; Tauranga South; Tauranga 3112; New Zealand; 37.7026°S 176.1572°E

Information
- Type: State Secondary school
- Motto: Latin: Pergo et Perago (I take up the work and I carry it through)
- Established: 1958
- Ministry of Education Institution no.: 121
- Principal: Andrew Turner
- Staff: 125
- Years offered: 9–13
- Gender: Boys-only
- Age: 12 to 18
- Enrolment: 2,288 (July 2026)
- Houses: Freyberg; Halberg; Hillary; Ngarimu; Ngata; Rutherford
- Nickname: Titans
- Socio-economic decile: 6N
- Website: www.tbc.school.nz

Tauranga Boys' College is a state secondary school for boys, located on the edge of the downtown area of Tauranga, New Zealand. The school was founded in 1946 as Tauranga College, before overcrowding saw the school become single-sex in 1958. The school has a roll of 2,288 students from years 9 to 13 (approx. ages 13 to 18) as of July 2026. In 2019 Tauranga Boys' gained the most scholarships in the Bay of Plenty region with 31 scholarships and 6 outstanding scholarships.

== History ==
Secondary education in Tauranga began in 1900, with the establishment of a district high school joined with Tauranga School. By the mid-1930s, the buildings were inadequate for use, and a push for a separate secondary school began. In 1937, the education board purchased the motor camp "Hillsdene", originally one of the 10-acre (40,000 m^{2}) blocks laid out after the Battle of Gate Pā. However, World War II delayed building on the site until 1944. After two years of building, Tauranga College was opened on 5 February 1946. The college ran until 1958 – due to overcrowding, female students moved to a newly built campus, which was named Tauranga Girls' College. Male students remained in Tauranga College, which became known as Tauranga Boys' College.

The College seeks to honour the past in creating the future. This includes honours boards recognising head students and top scholars and the displaying of memorabilia from old boys who have represented New Zealand. It also has buildings named after former principals and has a living war memorial of totara trees for World War II victims. There are also memorial trees for staff and students who died whilst at the College.

The College won NZSS Boys' First XI Football title, with a 1–0 victory in the final in Napier on 2 September 2022.

In 2024 the College had a year of sporting success. The First XI Hockey, Senior A Volleyball, Senior A Water Polo, Cross Country 6 man and the Sevens Rugby all won their respective senior national titles. The Football First XI were runners-up.

=== Principals ===
	Name	Term
1	Arthur Nicholson	1958–1959
2	Garth Sim	1959–1967
3	Rodger Barton	1967–1971
4	Norman Morris	1971–1984
5	Graham Young	1984–2008
6	Robert Mangan	2008–2022
7	Andrew Turner	2022–present

== Houses ==
Tauranga Boys' College has six houses. The houses are all named after prominent New Zealanders. In alphabetical order, they are:

- Freyberg (red), named after soldier Bernard Freyberg
- Halberg (black), named after athlete Murray Halberg
- Hillary (yellow), named after mountaineer Edmund Hillary
- Ngarimu (green), named after soldier Moana-Nui-a-Kiwa Ngarimu
- Ngata (white), named after politician Āpirana Ngata
- Rutherford (blue), named after scientist Ernest Rutherford

== Notable alumni ==
=== Academia ===
- Bryan Gould – Rhodes Scholar, UK Labour politician & Vice Chancellor University of Waikato
- A. Rod Gover – Rhodes Scholar

=== The arts ===
- Nigel Brown ONZM – artist
- Stuart G. Bugg – international debating
- Shane Cortese – actor
- Malcolm Evans – cartoonist
- Anthony Lapwood – short story writer
- Ian Mune OBE – actor
- Erik Thomson – actor
- Richard O'Brien – actor and musician
- Jeremy Redmore – musician

=== Public service ===
- Tuariki Delamere – politician & Commonwealth Games athlete
- Air Marshal Sir Bruce Ferguson – KNZM, OBE, AFC Chief of New Zealand Defence Force
- Todd Muller – Member of Parliament for the Bay of Plenty (2014–present) and former Leader of the Opposition (New Zealand)

=== Sport ===
- Josh Bartlett - Highlanders Rugby
- Riley Bidois – NZ Football – 2024 Olympian
- Jonty Bidois – Auckland FC
- Kris Bouckenooghe – NZ Football
- Brendon Bracewell – NZ Cricket
- John Bracewell – NZ Cricket
- Daniel Braid – All Black
- Mick Bremner – All Black
- Peter Burke – All Black
- Peter Burling (born 1991) – Olympic sailor
- Sam Cane – All Black
- Leroy Carter - All Black
- Adrian Cashmore – All Black
- Lucas Cashmore - Hurricanes Rugby
- John Clark – NZ Rowing – 1972 Olympian
- Stuart Conn – All Black
- Geoff Cotter – NZ Rowing – 1988 Olympian
- Mahé Drysdale (born 1978) – Olympic rower 2008-2016 - Mayor of Tauranga
- Peter Drysdale - ND Cricket - Head Boy 2006
- Daniel Flynn – NZ Cricket
- Stephen Graham – NZ Hockey
- Wayne Graham – All Black
- Andy Hayward – NZ Hockey
- Nathan Harris – All Black
- Jarrad Hoeata – All Black
- Brendon Julian – Australian cricketer
- Greg Kane – All Black
- Tanerau Latimer – All Black
- Tony Lochhead – NZ Football, 2010 Fifa World Cup representative
- Sam Meech (born 1991) – Olympic sailor
- Brent Newdick – NZ decathlete, Commonwealth Games silver medallist
- Jordan Parry – NZ Rowing – 2020 and 2024 Olympian
- David Rayner – NZ Football
- Aidan Ross – All Black
- Greg Rowlands – All Black
- Jason Saunders (born 1991) – Olympic sailor
- Paul Simonsson – All Black
- Owen Stephens – All Black and Wallaby; rugby union and rugby league
- Aisake Vakasiuola - Chiefs Rugby
- Roger White-Parsons – NZ Rowing – 1984 Olympian
- Kane Williamson – NZ Cricket - Head Boy 2008
- Royce Willis – All Black
