= National First XV Championship (New Zealand) =

Rugby competition

The National First XV Championship (or the Top 4) is the Premier Rugby Union competition for Secondary Schools/Colleges in New Zealand. Since 2016, the Top 4 tournament has been based at the Massey University Sport and Rugby Institute in Palmerston North. The New Zealand Schools' and New Zealand Barbarians Schools' teams are generally announced at the conclusion of the tournament, whereby a development camp will take place the following week at the institute.

The winning school of the Top 4 tournament is awarded the National Championship title and recognised as the top NZ 1st XV school in the nation. Additionally, they are nominated as the representative team for New Zealand at the SANIX World Rugby Tournament. If the scores are tied at fulltime, the title is shared and the SANIX nomination is decided as-per the semi-final tiebreaker process.

== Qualification ==
The National First XV Championship is determined through the Top 4, comprising the winners of the four regions: Blues, Chiefs, Hurricanes and South Island. The Top 4 was established in 1982 as an invitational tournament, with invitations extended to high school 1st XV teams based on their form in the previous season. This format was used throughout the 1980s. The qualification process has changed multiple times since then, before settling into its current format.

Each region operates its own qualification system:

Blues:
The Northland and North Harbour champions meet, with the winner facing the Auckland 1A Competition champion in the Blues Cup final. The winner of this match represents the Blues region in the National Top 4 Tournament.

Chiefs:
Each province within the Chiefs region determines their own winner, followed by a knockout bracket. The bracket includes the highest-ranked Chiefs region team from the Super 8 competition (Hamilton Boys' High School, Rotorua Boys' High School, Tauranga Boys' College or New Plymouth Boys' High School) and the highest-ranked Chiefs region team from the Central North Island 1st XV competition. These teams play for a place in the Chiefs semi-final, joined by the winner of a Chiefs playoff match (between the next two highest-ranked Chiefs region teams from the Super 8), a New Plymouth representative and a Waikato/Counties Manukau representative. The winners of the semi-finals meet in the Chiefs Cup Final, and the champion represents the Chiefs region in the National Top 4 Tournament.

Hurricanes:
The winner and runner-up of the Wellington Premiership and the two highest-ranked Hurricanes region teams from the Super 8 competition (Gisborne Boys' High School, Napier Boys' High School, Hastings Boys' High School or Palmerston North Boys' High School), compete in seeded semi-finals. A challenger place is available to any school in the region, including those outside the main competitions, with that match played before the semi-finals. The winners of the semi-finals meet in the Hurricanes Cup final, and the champion represents the Hurricanes region in the National Top 4 tournament.

South Island: The Crusaders Cup winner is the top side from the region-wide Miles Toyota Championship. Since the discontinuation of the Highlanders-region competition after 2015, a provincial knockout format has been used. The Otago Premier School winner may face a Waitaki representative, with the winner meeting a Southland representative in the Highlanders Cup final. The Highlanders Cup winner then plays the Crusaders Cup winner and the champion represents the South Island in the National Top 4 tournament.

Top 4 Tournament

The four regional-franchise winners advance to the Top 4 tournament, where two semi-finals are played at a single host venue each year. The winners advance to the National 1st XV Final. The semi-final matchups rotate annually; for example, the Blues winner may face the Hurricanes winner one year, the Chiefs winner the next, and the South Island winner the following year. This format does not necessarily ensure the four strongest High School 1st XVs qualify, as team strength is no evenly distributed across regions. However, it provides balanced regional representation while maintaining a high quality standard through the qualifying system.

The Moascar Cup may also be contested during the tournament, as the holder must defend it if present at the Top 4.

Some titles have been shared. Some feel that an extra-time period should be introduced to determine an outright winner, but extra-time is not allowed under World Rugby's Under-19 variations. In the event of a drawn semi-final, the team that advances is determined by a hierarchy of factors, starting with the number of tries scored.

== List of results ==
=== Top 4 results table ===
Below is a list of historical Top 4 results, with each school's New Zealand Super Rugby region shown in brackets. Where scores are tied at full-time (70min), the title is shared, as extra time is not played in 1st XV matches. Third and fourth playoff matches were not held from 2002 to 2004 and 2012–2014, which is indicated by a dash in place of the score. The losing semi-finalists from those years are recorded as third-equal, as is the case with a drawn result.

The tournament was cancelled for the first time in 2020 due to delays to the Rugby season caused by the COVID-19 pandemic, allowing schools to prioritise their local competitions. It was cancelled again in 2021 because of COVID-19 restrictions.

| Final | Winning team | Score | Losing team | 3rd/4th Playoff | Winning Team | Score | Losing team | Ref |
|---|---|---|---|---|---|---|---|---|
| 2026 | St Andrew's College (Crusaders, South Island) | 34–24 | Tauranga Boys' College (Chiefs) | 2026 | Westlake Boys High School (Blues) | 52–42 | St Pat's Silverstream (Hurricanes) | |
| 2025 | Rotorua Boys' High School (Chiefs) | 43–17 | Feilding High School (Hurricanes) | 2025 | Southland Boys' High School (Highlanders, South Island) | 21–19 | Westlake Boys High School (Blues) | |
| 2024 | Hamilton Boys' High School (Chiefs) | 27–17 | Nelson College (Crusaders, South Island) | 2024 | Feilding High School (Hurricanes) | 35–32 | Kelston Boys' High School (Blues) | |
| 2023 | Southland Boys' High School (Highlanders, South Island) | 32–29 | Westlake Boys High School (Blues) | 2023 | Palmerston North Boys' High School (Hurricanes) | 31–24 | Tauranga Boys' College (Chiefs) | |
| 2022 | Hamilton Boys' High School (Chiefs) | 17–15 | Napier Boys' High School (Hurricanes) | 2022 | Westlake Boys High School (Blues) | 36–22 | John McGlashan College (Highlanders, South Island) | |
| 2021 | Cancelled | – | Cancelled | 2021 | Cancelled | – | Cancelled | |
| 2020 | Cancelled | – | Cancelled | 2020 | Cancelled | – | Cancelled | |
| 2019 | Hastings Boys' High School (Hurricanes) | 27–14 | King's College (Blues) | 2019 | Hamilton Boys' High School (Chiefs) | 26–14 | Nelson College (Crusaders, South Island) | |
| 2018 | St Peter's College, Auckland (Blues) | 31–28 | Napier Boys' High School (Hurricanes) | 2018 | Hamilton Boys' High School (Chiefs) | 43–25 | Christchurch Boys' High School (Crusaders, South Island) | |
| 2017 | Hastings Boys' High School (Hurricanes) | 25–17 | Hamilton Boys' High School (Chiefs) | 2017 | Saint Kentigern College (Blues) | 21–3 | Southland Boys' High School (Highlanders, South Island) | |
| 2016 | Mount Albert Grammar (Blues) | 14–13 | Hastings Boys' High School (Hurricanes) | 2016 | Hamilton Boys' High School (Chiefs) | 36–10 | Southland Boys' High School (Highlanders, South Island) | |
| 2015 | Rotorua Boys' High School (Chiefs) | 36–27 | Scots College (Hurricanes) | 2015 | Saint Kentigern College (Blues) | 31–27 | Otago Boys' High School (Highlanders, South Island) | |
| 2014 | Hamilton Boys' High School (Chiefs) | 26–26 | Scots College (Hurricanes) | 2014 | Auckland Grammar (Blues) | – | Christchurch Boys' High School (Crusaders, South Island) | |
| 2013 | Hamilton Boys' High School (Chiefs) | 12–10 | Saint Kentigern College (Blues) | 2013 | Wellington College (Hurricanes) | – | Otago Boys' High School (Highlanders, South Island) | |
| 2012 | Saint Kentigern College (Blues) | 31–5 | Otago Boys' High School (Highlanders, South Island) | 2012 | Hamilton Boys' High School (Chiefs) | – | Napier Boys' High School (Hurricanes) | |
| 2011 | Kelston Boys' High School (Blues) | 24–14 | Wesley College (Chiefs) | 2011 | St Bede's College (Crusaders, South Island) | 36–36 | Napier Boys' High School (Hurricanes) | |
| 2010 | Mount Albert Grammar (Blues) | 20–17 | Hamilton Boys' High School (Chiefs) | 2010 | Gisborne Boys' High School (Hurricanes) | 26–14 | St Bede's College (Crusaders, South Island) | |
| 2009 | Hamilton Boys' High School (Chiefs) | 17–0 | St Bede's College (Crusaders, South Island) | 2009 | Mount Albert Grammar (Blues) | 48–17 | Napier Boys' High School (Hurricanes) | |
| 2008 | De La Salle' College Mangere East (Blues) | 6–6 | Hamilton Boys High (Chiefs) | 2008 | St Bede's College (Crusaders, South Island) | 14–12 | Wellington College (Hurricanes) | |
| 2007 | Gisborne Boys' High School (Hurricanes) | 35–24 | Mount Albert Grammar (Blues) | 2007 | Hamilton Boys' High School (Chiefs) | 31–3 | Nelson College (Crusaders, South Island) | |
| 2006 | Christchurch Boys' High School (Crusaders, South Island) | 18–14 | Auckland Grammar (Blues) | 2006 | Gisborne Boys' High School (Hurricanes) | 32–17 | Rotorua Boys' High School (Chiefs) | |
| 2005 | Christchurch Boys' High School (Crusaders, South Island) | 23–10 | King's College (Blues) | 2005 | Palmerston North Boys' High School (Hurricanes) | 40–34 | Wesley College (Chiefs) | |
| 2004 | Christchurch Boys' High School (Crusaders, South Island) | 22–22 | Wesley College (Chiefs) | 2004 | Hastings Boys' High School (Hurricanes) | – | Hamilton Boys' High School (Chiefs) | |
| 2003 | Rotorua Boys' High School (Chiefs) | 31–11 | Napier Boys' High School (Hurricanes) | 2003 | Southland Boys' High School (Highlanders, South Island) | – | De La Salle College (Blues) | |
| 2002 | Napier Boys' High School (Hurricanes) | 6–6 | Rotorua Boys' High School (Chiefs) | 2002 | Auckland Grammar (Blues) | – | Otago Boys' High School (Highlanders, South Island) | |
| 2001 | Wesley College (Chiefs) | 53–32 | Rotorua Boys' High School (Chiefs) | 2001 | Napier Boys' High School (Hurricanes) | 26–0 | Southland Boys' High School (Highlanders, South Island) | |
| 2000 | St Peter's College, Auckland (Blues) | 20–12 | Wellington College (Hurricanes) | 2000 | Gisborne Boys' High School (Hurricanes) | 41–28 | Otago Boys' High School (Highlanders, South Island) | |
| 1999 | Kelston Boys' High School (Blues) | 21–18 | Christchurch Boys' High School (Crusaders, South Island) | 1999 | Rotorua Boys' High School (Chiefs) | 24–22 | Wellington College (Hurricanes) | |
| 1998 | Otago Boys' High School (Highlanders, South Island) | 5–5 | Rotorua Boys' High School (Chiefs) | 1998 | Kelston Boys' High School (Blues) | 46–7 | Wellington College (Hurricanes) | |
| 1997 | Wesley College (Chiefs) | 41–3 | Palmerston North Boys' High School (Hurricanes) | 1997 | Southland Boys' High School (Highlanders, South Island) | 28–27 | Rongotai College (Hurricanes) | |
| 1996 | Kelston Boys' High School (Blues) | 29–11 | Palmerston North Boys' High School (Hurricanes) | 1996 | Rongotai College (Hurricanes) | 37–13 | King's High School (Highlanders, South Island) | |
| 1995 | Kelston Boys' High School (Blues) | 19–10 | Wellington College (Hurricanes) | 1995 | Timaru Boys' High School (Crusaders, South Island) | 25–10 | Southland Boys' High School (Highlanders, South Island) | |
| 1994 | Gisborne Boys' High School (Hurricanes) | 14–3 | St Stephen's School (Chiefs) | 1994 | Wellington College (Hurricanes) | 19–15 | Otago Boys' High School (Highlanders, South Island) | |
| 1993 | Wesley College (Chiefs) | 13–7 | St Paul's Collegiate (Chiefs) | 1993 | Gisborne Boys' High School (Hurricanes) | 53–18 | Southland Boys' High School (Highlanders, South Island) | |
| 1992 | Auckland Grammar (Blues) | 17–3 | Napier Boys' High School (Hurricanes) | 1992 | Otago Boys' High School (Highlanders, South Island) | 19–19 | Christchurch Boys' High School (Crusaders, South Island) | |
| 1991 | St Stephen's School (Chiefs) | 21–6 | Gisborne Boys' High School (Hurricanes) | 1991 | St Augustine's College (Hurricanes) | 13–7 | St Andrew's College (Crusaders, South Island) | |
| 1990 | Wesley College (Chiefs) | 21–6 | Gisborne Boys' High School (Hurricanes) | 1990 | Southland Boys' High School (Highlanders, South Island) | 18–10 | King's High School (Highlanders, South Island) | |
| 1989 | Kelston Boys' High School (Blues) | 22–19 | Wesley College (Chiefs) | 1989 | Otago Boys' High School (Highlanders, South Island) | 13–10 | Hastings Boys' High School (Hurricanes) | |
| 1988 | Gisborne Boys' High School (Hurricanes) | 24–15 | Napier Boys' High School (Hurricanes) | 1988 | Western Heights High School (Chiefs) | 13–10 | Shirley Boys' High School (Crusaders, South Island) | |
| 1987 | St Peter's College, Auckland (Blues) | 25–3 | Southland Boys' High School (Highlanders, South Island) | 1987 | Otago Boys' High School (Highlanders, South Island) | 29–9 | Hutt Valley High School (Hurricanes) | |
| 1986 | Auckland Grammar (Blues) | 15–6 | St Stephen's School (Chiefs) | 1986 | Napier Boys' High School (Hurricanes) | 31–8 | St Andrew's College (Crusaders, South Island) | |
| 1985 | St Stephen's School (Chiefs) | 26–3 | Napier Boys' High School (Hurricanes) | 1985 | Rongotai College (Hurricanes) | 37–13 | St Kevin's College (Highlanders, South Island) | |
| 1984 | Te Aute College (Hurricanes) | 7–4 | St Stephen's School (Chiefs) | 1984 | St Bede's College (Crusaders, South Island) | 22–17 | Otago Boys' High School (Highlanders, South Island) | |
| 1983 | Auckland Grammar (Blues) | 20–10 | St Bede's College (Crusaders, South Island) | 1983 | Gisborne Boys' High School (Hurricanes) | 12–10 | Tauranga Boys' College (Chiefs) | |
| 1982 | Mount Albert Grammar (Blues) | 11–4 | Waitaki Boys' High School (Highlanders, South Island) | 1982 | Western Heights High School (Chiefs) | 16–4 | Rathkeale College (Hurricanes) | |

=== Summary table ===
Below is a summary table of the results of each school that has appeared in the Top 4. The most successful school is Hamilton Boys' High School of the Chiefs region, with 13 appearances and 6 titles, all achieved since 2004.Wesley College (Chiefs region) follows with 5 titles and 7 finals appearances, and Kelston Boys' High School (Blues region) also has 5 titles, winning the top 4 in all of their five appearances. Napier Boys' High School (Hurricanes region) and Otago Boys' High School (Highlanders/South Island region) have each made 11 Top 4 appearances. The record for most consecutive titles is held by Christchurch Boys' High School (Crusaders/South Island region) with three championships from 2004 to 2006. Two other schools have successfully defended their titles: Hamilton Boys' High School (2008–2009 and 2013–2014) and Kelston Boys' High School (1995–1996).

All-time Top 4 appearances by school
| Team | Titles | Years | Second | Years | Finals | Third | Fourth | Apps. |
|---|---|---|---|---|---|---|---|---|
| Hamilton Boys' High School (Chiefs) | 6 | 2008, 2009, 2013, 2014, 2022, 2024 | 2 | 2010, 2017 | 8 | 2004, 2007, 2012, 2016, 2018, 2019 | – | 14 |
| Wesley College (Chiefs) | 5 | 1990, 1993, 1997, 2001, 2004 | 2 | 1989, 2011 | 7 | – | 2005 | 8 |
| Rotorua Boys' High School (Chiefs) | 5 | 1998, 2002, 2003, 2015, 2025 | 1 | 2001 | 6 | 1999 | 2006 | 8 |
| Kelston Boys' High School (Blues) | 5 | 1989, 1995, 1996, 1999, 2011 | 0 | – | 5 | 1998 | 2024 | 7 |
| Gisborne Boys' High School (Hurricanes) | 3 | 1988, 1994, 2007 | 2 | 1990, 1991 | 5 | 1983, 1993, 2000, 2006, 2010 | – | 10 |
| Christchurch Boys' High School (Crusaders, South Island) | 3 | 2004, 2005, 2006 | 1 | 1999 | 4 | 1992, 2014 | 2018 | 7 |
| Auckland Grammar (Blues) | 3 | 1983, 1986, 1992 | 1 | 2006 | 4 | 2002, 2014 | – | 6 |
| Mount Albert Grammar (Blues) | 3 | 1982, 2010, 2016 | 1 | 2007 | 4 | 2009 | – | 5 |
| St Peter's College, Auckland (Blues) | 3 | 1987, 2000, 2018 | 0 | – | 3 | – | – | 3 |
| St Stephen's School (Chiefs) | 2 | 1985, 1991 | 3 | 1984, 1986, 1994 | 5 | – | – | 5 |
| Hastings Boys' High School (Hurricanes) | 2 | 2017, 2019 | 1 | 2016 | 3 | 2004 | 1989 | 5 |
| Napier Boys' High School (Hurricanes) | 1 | 2002 | 6 | 1985, 1988, 1992, 2003, 2018, 2022 | 7 | 1986, 2001, 2011, 2012 | 2009 | 12 |
| Otago Boys' High School (Highlanders, South Island) | 1 | 1998 | 1 | 2012 | 2 | 1987, 1989, 1992, 2002, 2013 | 1984, 1994, 2000, 2015 | 11 |
| Southland Boys' High School (Highlanders, South Island) | 1 | 2023 | 1 | 1987 | 2 | 1990, 1997, 2003, 2025 | 1993, 1995, 2001, 2016, 2017 | 11 |
| Saint Kentigern College (Blues) | 1 | 2012 | 1 | 2013 | 2 | 2015, 2017 | – | 4 |
| Scots College (Hurricanes) | 1 | 2014 | 1 | 2015 | 2 | – | – | 2 |
| De La Salle College (Blues) | 1 | 2008 | 0 | – | 1 | 2003 | – | 2 |
| Te Aute College (Hurricanes) | 1 | 1984 | 0 | – | 1 | – | – | 1 |
| St Bede's College (Crusaders, South Island) | 0 | | 2 | 1983, 2009 | 2 | 1984, 2008, 2011 | 2010 | 6 |
| Wellington College (Hurricanes) | 0 | – | 2 | 1995, 2000 | 2 | 1994, 2013 | 1998, 1999, 2008 | 7 |
| Palmerston North Boys' High School (Hurricanes) | 0 | – | 2 | 1996, 1997 | 2 | 2005, 2023 | – | 4 |
| King's College (Blues) | 0 | – | 2 | 2005, 2019 | 2 | – | – | 2 |
| Westlake Boys High School (Blues) | 0 | – | 1 | 2023 | 1 | 2022 | 2025 | 3 |
| Feilding High School (Hurricanes) | 0 | – | 1 | 2025 | 1 | 2024 | – | 2 |
| Nelson College (Crusaders, South Island) | 0 | – | 1 | 2024 | 1 | – | 2007, 2019 | 3 |
| Waitaki Boys' High School (Highlanders, South Island) | 0 | – | 1 | 1982 | 1 | – | – | 1 |
| St Paul's Collegiate (Chiefs) | 0 | – | 1 | 1993 | 1 | – | – | 1 |
| Rongotai College (Hurricanes) | 0 | – | 0 | – | 0 | 1985, 1996 | 1997 | 3 |
| Western Heights High School (Chiefs) | 0 | – | 0 | – | 0 | 1982, 1988 | – | 2 |
| St Augustine's College (Hurricanes) | 0 | – | 0 | – | 0 | 1991 | – | 1 |
| Timaru Boys' High School (Crusaders, South Island) | 0 | – | 0 | – | 0 | 1995 | – | 1 |
| Tauranga Boys' College (Chiefs) | 0 | – | 0 | – | 0 | – | 1983, 2023 | 2 |
| St Andrew's College (Crusaders, South Island) | 0 | – | 0 | – | 0 | – | 1986, 1991 | 2 |
| King's High School (Highlanders, South Island) | 0 | – | 0 | – | 0 | – | 1990, 1996 | 2 |
| Rathkeale College (Hurricanes) | 0 | – | 0 | – | 0 | – | 1982 | 1 |
| St Kevin's College (Highlanders, South Island) | 0 | – | 0 | – | 0 | – | 1985 | 1 |
| Hutt Valley High School (Hurricanes) | 0 | – | 0 | – | 0 | – | 1987 | 1 |
| Shirley Boys' High School (Crusaders, South Island) | 0 | – | 0 | – | 0 | – | 1988 | 1 |
| John McGlashan College (Highlanders, South Island) | 0 | – | 0 | – | 0 | – | 2022 | 1 |

=== Summary table by region ===
Below is a summary table of Top 4 results sorted by the representative Super Rugby regions. Due to the tournament previously being invitational, the number of appearances by Blues, Chiefs, Hurricanes and South Island representations are not equal – some years multiple teams from one region were present, whilst in other years, no teams from a particular region were present. The region that has produced the most title wins is the Blues with 16 titles from 28 appearances, closely followed by the Chiefs region with 15 titles from 36 Top 4 appearances. The Hurricanes region has produced the most finals appearances, having schools from the Hurricanes region present 45 times in the Top 4, in the 38 editions since its inception.

All-time Top 4 appearances by region
| Team | Titles | Years | 2nd | Years | Finals | 3rd | Years | 4th | Years | Apps. |
|---|---|---|---|---|---|---|---|---|---|---|
| Chiefs | 18 | 1985, 1990–91, 1993, 1997–98, 2001–04, 2008–09, 2013–15, 2022, 2024–25 | 9 | 1984, 1986, 1989, 1993–94, 2001, 2010–11, 2017 | 27 | 9 | 1982, 1988, 1999, 2004, 2007, 2012, 2016, 2018–19 | 4 | 1983, 2005–06, 2023 | 40 |
| Blues | 16 | 1982–83, 1986–87, 1989, 1992, 1995–96, 1999–00, 2008, 2010–12, 2016, 2018 | 6 | 2005–07, 2013, 2019, 2023 | 22 | 8 | 1998, 2002–03, 2009, 2014–15, 2017, 2022 | 2 | 2024–25 | 32 |
| Hurricanes | 8 | 1984, 1988, 1994, 2002, 2007, 2014, 2017, 2019 | 15 | 1985, 1988, 1990–92, 1995–97, 2000, 2003, 2015–16, 2018, 2022, 2025 | 23 | 18 | 1983, 1985–86, 1991, 1993–94, 1996, 2000–01, 2004–06, 2010–13, 2023–24 | 8 | 1982, 1987, 1989, 1997–99, 2008–09 | 49 |
| South Island | 5 | 1998, 2004–06, 2023 | 7 | 1982–83, 1987, 1999, 2009, 2012, 2024 | 12 | 15 | 1984, 1987, 1989–90, 1992/1992, 1995, 1997, 2002–03, 2008, 2011, 2013–14, 2025 | 20 | 1984–86, 1988, 1990–91, 1993–96, 2000–01, 2007, 2010, 2015–19, 2022 | 47 |
| Crusaders | 3 | 2004–06 | 4 | 1983, 1999, 2009, 2024 | 7 | 6 | 1984, 1992, 1995, 2008, 2011, 2014 | 7 | 1986, 1988, 1991, 2007, 2010, 2018–19 | 20 |
| Highlanders | 2 | 1998, 2023 | 3 | 1982, 1987, 2012 | 5 | 9 | 1987, 1989–90, 1992, 1997, 2002–03, 2013, 2025 | 13 | 1984–1985, 1990, 1993–96, 2000–01, 2015–17, 2022 | 27 |

=== Results by local competition ===
Below is a summary table of Top 4 results sorted by the representative local competition. Because some competitions include schools from multiple Super Rugby regions, certain years feature more that one team from the same competition. The Auckland 1A 1st XV competition has produced the most titles, with 16 titles from 28 appearances, followed by the Super 8 1st XV competition with 14 titles from 49 Top 4 appearances. Super 8 schools have made the most overall Top 4 appearances, appearing 49 times across 38 editions held since its inception. In 2002, Napier Boys' High School (Hurricanes) and Rotorua Boys' High School (Chiefs) drew the final and shared the title. In 2004 and 2012 the playoff for third place was not held, and the teams involved (Napier Boys' High School (Hurricanes) and Hamilton Boys' High School (Chiefs) in 2004, and Hamilton Boys' High School and Hastings Boys' High School (Hurricanes) in 2012) shared third place. All of these schools are members of the Super 8 1st XV competition, so those years appear twice to reflect each schools' result.

All-time Top 4 appearances by competition
| Team | Titles | Years | 2nd | Years | Finals | 3rd | Years | 4th | Years | Apps. |
|---|---|---|---|---|---|---|---|---|---|---|
| Super 8 1st XV | 17 | 1988, 1994, 1998, 2002, 2002–03, 2007–09, 2013–15, 2017, 2019, 2022, 2024–25 | 14 | 1985, 1988, 1990–92, 1996–97, 2001, 2003, 2010, 2016–18, 2022 | 31 | 19 | 1983, 1986, 1993, 1999–01, 2004, 2004–07, 2007, 2010–12, 2012, 2016, 2018–19, 2023 | 5 | 1983, 1989, 2006, 2009, 2023 | 55 |
| Auckland 1A | 16 | 1982–83, 1986–87, 1989, 1992, 1995–96, 1999–00, 2008, 2010–12, 2016, 2018 | 5 | 2005–07, 2013, 2019 | 21 | 7 | 1998, 2002–03, 2009, 2014–15, 2017 | 1 | 2024 | 29 |
| Central North Island 1st XV | 7 | 1985, 1990, 1991, 1993, 1997, 2001, 2004 | 7 | 1985, 1986, 1989, 1993–94, 2011, 2025 | 14 | 1 | 2024 | 2 | 1982, 2005 | 17 |
| UC Championship | 3 | 2004–06 | 4 | 1983, 1999, 2009, 2024 | 7 | 6 | 1984, 1992, 1995, 2008, 2011, 2014 | 7 | 1986, 1988, 1991, 2007, 2010, 2018–19 | 20 |
| Otago Premier Schools | 2 | 1998, 2023 | 3 | 1982, 1987, 2012 | 5 | 9 | 1987, 1989, 1990, 1992, 1997, 2002–03, 2013, 2025 | 13 | 1984–1985, 1990, 1993–96, 2000–01, 2015–17,2022 | 27 |
| Wellington 1st XV Premiership | 1 | 2014 | 3 | 1995, 2000, 2015 | 4 | 4 | 1985, 1994, 1996, 1992, 2013 | 5 | 1987, 1997, 1998, 1999, 2008 | 13 |
| Whanganui 1st XV | 1 | 1984 | 0 | – | 1 | 0 | – | 0 | – | 1 |
| North Harbour 1A | 0 | – | 1 | 2023 | 1 | 1 | 2022 | 1 | 2025 | 3 |
| BOP SS Championship | 0 | – | 0 | – | 0 | 2 | 1982, 1988 | 0 | – | 2 |
| HB SS Championship | 0 | – | 0 | – | 0 | 1 | 1991 | 0 | – | 1 |

=== Semifinal results table ===
Below is a list of historical Top 4 semifinal results, with their New Zealand Super Rugby regions in brackets.

In the event of a drawn semi-final at full-time (70min), the team that advances is determined by a number of different factors, as no extra time is played in 1st XV matches. The hierarchy begins with which team scored the most tries in the match, followed by which team scored the first try. If no tries have been scored, the winner is the team that scored the first points. If the score is 0–0 at fulltime, the team that progresses is decided by the flip of a coin.

Third/fourth playoff matches were not played from 2002 to 2004 and from 2012 to 2014. The losing semi-finalists from those years are treated as third-equal, as is the case with a drawn result in a normal 3rd/4th playoff match.

| SF1 | Winning team | Score | Losing team | SF2 | Winning Team | Score | Losing team | Ref |
|---|---|---|---|---|---|---|---|---|
| 2025 | Feilding High School (Hurricanes) | 39–34 | Westlake Boys High School (Blues) | 2024 | Rotorua Boys' High School (Chiefs) | 41–10 | Southland Boys' High School (Highlanders) | |
| 2024 | Hamilton Boys' High School (Chiefs) | 23–19 | Feilding High School (Hurricanes) | 2024 | Nelson College (Crusaders, South Island) | 26–18 | Kelston Boys' High School (Blues) | |
| 2023 | Southland Boys' High School (Highlanders) | 20–19 | Palmerston North Boys' High School (Hurricanes) | 2023 | Westlake Boys High School (Blues) | 48–14 | Tauranga Boys' College (Chiefs) | |
| 2022 | Napier Boys' High School (Hurricanes) | 40–17 | Westlake Boys High School (Blues) | 2022 | Hamilton Boys' High School (Chiefs) | 48–14 | John McGlashan College (Highlanders) | |
| 2021 | Cancelled | – | Cancelled | 2021 | Cancelled | – | Cancelled | |
| 2020 | Cancelled | – | Cancelled | 2020 | Cancelled | – | Cancelled | |
| 2019 | King's College (Blues) | 49–17 | Nelson College (Crusaders, South Island) | 2019 | Hastings Boys' High School (Hurricanes) | 11–10 | Hamilton Boys' High School (Chiefs) | |
| 2018 | St Peter's College, Auckland (Blues) | 8–7 | Hamilton Boys' High School (Chiefs) | 2018 | Napier Boys' High School (Hurricanes) | 31–14 | Christchurch Boys' High School (Crusaders, South Island) | |
| 2017 | Hastings Boys' High School (Hurricanes) | 29–10 | Saint Kentigern College (Blues) | 2017 | Hamilton Boys' High School (Chiefs) | 49–0 | Southland Boys' High School (Highlanders, South Island) | |
| 2016 | Mount Albert Grammar (Blues) | 41–0 | Southland Boys' High School (Highlanders, South Island) | 2016 | Hastings Boys' High School (Hurricanes) | 18–10 | Hamilton Boys' High School (Chiefs) | |
| 2015 | Scots College (Hurricanes) | 35–27 | Otago Boys' High School (Highlanders, South Island) | 2015 | Rotorua Boys' High School (Chiefs) | 7–5 | Saint Kentigern College (Blues) | |
| 2014 | Scots College (Hurricanes) | 39–22 | Auckland Grammar (Blues) | 2014 | Hamilton Boys' High School (Chiefs) | 20–19 | Christchurch Boys' High School (Crusaders, South Island) | |
| 2013 | Saint Kentigern College (Blues) | 27–7 | Otago Boys' High School (Highlanders, South Island) | 2013 | Hamilton Boys' High School (Chiefs) | 28–16 | Wellington College (Hurricanes) | |
| 2012 | Saint Kentigern College (Blues) | 29–13 | Hamilton Boys' High School (Chiefs) | 2012 | Otago Boys' High School (Highlanders, South Island) | 30–16 | Napier Boys' High School (Hurricanes) | |
| 2011 | Kelston Boys' High School (Blues) | 29–26 | Napier Boys' High School (Hurricanes) | 2011 | Wesley College (Chiefs) | 37–24 | St Bede's College (Crusaders, South Island) | |
| 2010 | Mount Albert Grammar (Blues) | 34–19 | St Bede's College (Crusaders, South Island) | 2010 | Hamilton Boys' High School (Chiefs) | 19–17 | Gisborne Boys' High School (Hurricanes) | |
| 2009 | St Bede's College (Crusaders, South Island) | 26–9 | Napier Boys' High School (Hurricanes) | 2009 | Hamilton Boys' High School (Chiefs) | 20–8 | Mount Albert Grammar (Blues) | |
| 2008 | Hamilton Boys' High School (Chiefs) | 25–3 | St Bede's College (Crusaders, South Island) | 2008 | De La Salle College (Blues) | 19–16 | Wellington College (Hurricanes) | |
| 2007 | Mount Albert Grammar (Blues) | 26–10 | Nelson College (Crusaders, South Island) | 2007 | Gisborne Boys' High School (Hurricanes) | 12–7 | Hamilton Boys' High School (Chiefs) | |
| 2006 | Christchurch Boys' High School (Crusaders, South Island) | 38–0 | Rotorua Boys' High School (Chiefs) | 2006 | Auckland Grammar (Blues) | 24–22 | Gisborne Boys' High School (Hurricanes) | |
| 2005 | Christchurch Boys' High School (Crusaders, South Island) | 16–9 | Palmerston North Boys' High School (Hurricanes) | 2005 | King's College (Blues) | 16–14 | Wesley College (Chiefs) | |
| 2004 | Wesley College (Chiefs) | 34–10 | Hamilton Boys' High School (Chiefs) | 2004 | Christchurch Boys' High School (Crusaders, South Island) | 21–14 | Hastings Boys' High School (Hurricanes) | |
| 2003 | Rotorua Boys' High School (Chiefs) | 27–14 | De La Salle College (Blues) | 2003 | Napier Boys' High School (Hurricanes) | 28–21 | Southland Boys' High School (Highlanders, South Island) | |
| 2002 | Napier Boys' High School (Hurricanes) | 32–13 | Otago Boys' High School (Highlanders, South Island) | 2002 | Rotorua Boys' High School (Chiefs) | 16–3 | Auckland Grammar (Blues) | |
| 2001 | Wesley College (Chiefs) | 33–11 | Napier Boys' High School (Hurricanes) | 2001 | Rotorua Boys' High School (Chiefs) | 17–12 | Southland Boys' High School (Highlanders, South Island) | |
| 2000 | St Peter's College, Auckland (Blues) | 16–8 | Gisborne Boys' High School (Hurricanes) | 2000 | Wellington College (Hurricanes) | 24–21 | Otago Boys' High School (Highlanders, South Island) | |
| 1999 | Kelston Boys' High School (Blues) | 28–8 | Rotorua Boys' High School (Chiefs) | 1999 | Christchurch Boys' High School (Crusaders, South Island) | 8–0 | Wellington College (Hurricanes) | |
| 1998 | Rotorua Boys' High School (Chiefs) | 13–7 | Wellington College (Hurricanes) | 1998 | Otago Boys' High School (Highlanders, South Island) | 13–7 | Kelston Boys' High School (Blues) | |
| 1997 | Wesley College (Chiefs) | 31–11 | Rongotai College (Hurricanes) | 1997 | Palmerston North Boys' High School (Hurricanes) | 23–20 | Southland Boys' High School (Highlanders, South Island) | |
| 1996 | Kelston Boys' High School (Blues) | 22–8 | King's High School (Highlanders, South Island) | 1996 | Palmerston North Boys' High School (Hurricanes) | 19–18 | Rongotai College (Hurricanes) | |
| 1995 | Kelston Boys' High School (Blues) | 27–22 | Timaru Boys' High School (Crusaders, South Island) | 1995 | Wellington College (Hurricanes) | 24–7 | Southland Boys' High School (Highlanders, South Island) | |
| 1994 | St Stephen's School (Chiefs) | 29–16 | Wellington College (Hurricanes) | 1994 | Gisborne Boys' High School (Hurricanes) | 20–5 | Otago Boys' High School (Highlanders, South Island) | |
| 1993 | Wesley College (Chiefs) | 11–8 | Gisborne Boys' High School (Hurricanes) | 1993 | St Paul's Collegiate (Chiefs) | ?–? | Southland Boys' High School (Highlanders, South Island) | |
| 1992 | Auckland Grammar (Blues) | 29–15 | Christchurch Boys' High School (Crusaders, South Island) | 1992 | Napier Boys' High School (Hurricanes) | 28–24 | Otago Boys' High School (Highlanders, South Island) | |
| 1991 | St Stephen's School (Chiefs) | 14–6 | St Augustine's College (Hurricanes) | 1991 | Gisborne Boys' High School (Hurricanes) | 13–4 | St Andrew's College (Crusaders, South Island) | |
| 1990 | Wesley College (Chiefs) | 22–7 | King's High School (Highlanders, South Island) | 1990 | Gisborne Boys' High School (Hurricanes) | 13–12 | Southland Boys' High School (Highlanders, South Island) | |
| 1989 | Wesley College (Chiefs) | 13–10 | Otago Boys' High School (Highlanders, South Island) | 1989 | Kelston Boys' High School (Blues) | 28–9 | Hastings Boys' High School (Hurricanes) | |
| 1988 | Gisborne Boys' High School (Hurricanes) | 14–9 | Western Heights High School (Chiefs) | 1988 | Napier Boys' High School (Hurricanes) | 19–9 | Shirley Boys' High School (Crusaders, South Island) | |
| 1987 | Southland Boys' High School (Highlanders, South Island) | 18–15 | Hutt Valley High School (Hurricanes) | 1987 | St Peter's College, Auckland (Blues) | 13–10 | Otago Boys' High School (Highlanders, South Island) | |
| 1986 | St Stephen's School (Chiefs) | 17–4 | Napier Boys' High School (Hurricanes) | 1986 | Auckland Grammar (Blues) | 22–3 | St Andrew's College (Crusaders, South Island) | |
| 1985 | St Stephen's School (Chiefs) | 19–6 | Rongotai College (Hurricanes) | 1985 | Napier Boys' High School (Hurricanes) | 6–4 | St Kevin's College (Highlanders, South Island) | |
| 1984 | Te Aute College (Hurricanes) | 21–16 | St Bede's College (Crusaders, South Island) | 1984 | St Stephen's School (Chiefs) | 29–16 | Otago Boys' High School (Highlanders, South Island) | |
| 1983 | Auckland Grammar (Blues) | 17–3 | Tauranga Boys' College (Chiefs) | 1983 | St Bede's College (Crusaders, South Island) | 19–3 | Gisborne Boys' High School (Hurricanes) | |
| 1982 | Mount Albert Grammar (Blues) | 20–12 | Rathkeale College (Hurricanes) | 1982 | Waitaki Boys' High School (Highlanders, South Island) | 12–12 | Western Heights High School (Chiefs) | |

== Moascar Cup ==
The Moascar Cup is the oldest and most prestigious nationwide trophy in New Zealand 1st XV rugby, originating at the end of World War One. Allied military divisions (British, Australian and New Zealand) stationed in Ismailia, Egypt, organised a rugby tournament while waiting to be sent home. A Sterling Silver trophy stamped "Made in London, 1904", was obtained for the event. Named the Moascar Cup (derived from the Arabic word for "camp".), the trophy was mounted on part of a German aircraft propeller shot down in Palestine. The Cup, which was also contested by a South African division, was won by the New Zealand Mounted Rifle Brigade.

After returning to New Zealand, the Brigade presented the trophy to the New Zealand Rugby Union, which assigned it to secondary schools rugby, to help rebuild the sport after the war. The first Moascar Cup match was played in 1920, with Christchurch Boys' High School defeating Palmerston North Boys' High School 1–0. A knockout competition was introduced across both islands, with finals held at Athletic Park, Wellington. After three years, the expensive and time consuming format proved difficult to sustain, and it was replaced by the challenge system that continues today.

The rules state that holders must nominate which matches other schools can challenge for the cup. This includes all regular-season home games, plus at least one match against a school from outside the holder's Provincial Union. Once the cup is available to be challenged for, the holder must announce at least seven challenge matches. All games played by the holder at the National First XV Championship (Top 4) automatically become challenge matches. Any playoff game leading up to the Top 4 is also a mandatory challenge, no matter where it is played. In the past, some holders avoided putting the cup on the line against stronger teams and only offered it against weaker ones, lowering the risk of losing it. Because of the prestige and demand for the cup, many want it defended more often, ideally at every home game and in all knockout matches.

Another suggest change relates to drawn matches. Like the National Top 4, there is no extra time. If the score is tied at full time, the defending teams keeps the Moascar Cup.

== Super 8 and Quadrangular Tournament ==
Two other major tournaments are also played, but neither affects qualification for the National Top 4. However, the Moascar Cup can still be defended during these tournaments if the holder chooses to put it on the line.

Formed in 1997, the New Zealand Super Eight is group of eight boys' high schools from the central North Island. They compete against each other instead of playing in their local competitions. The first Super Eight sports events began in 1998, sponsored by Canterbury International and included rugby and cricket. Since then, the Super Eight has expanded to cover 10 sports, a cultural festival and professional development programmes for school staff. In rugby, many believe the Super 8 is equal in strength to the Auckland 1A competition. Both are considered the toughest pre-Top 4 round-robin competitions in New Zealand secondary school rugby. The Super 8 is contested between, Gisborne Boys' High School, Hamilton Boys' High School, Rotorua Boys' High School, Tauranga Boys' College, Napier Boys' High School, Hastings Boys' High School, New Plymouth Boys' High School and Palmerston North Boys' High School.

The Quadrangular Tournament is the oldest secondary school rugby tournament in New Zealand. It is contested by Wanganui Collegiate, Wellington College, Nelson College and Christ's College. From 1890 to 1924 it was known as the Triangular Tournament, until Nelson College joined in 1925. The 100th Quadrangular Tournament was held in Whanganui in 2026. Despite its long history, the tournament does not receive the same recognition as the National Top 4, Auckland 1A or Super 8. No school from the Quadrangular has ever won a national championship. However, Wanganui Collegiate (1972), Wellington College (1972), and Nelson College (2016, 2017, 2018), have held the Moascar Cup.
