= Hamilton Boys' High School =

New Zealand boys' high school

- Māori: Te Kura Tamatāne o Kirikiriroa

Location
- Peachgrove Road; Hamilton East; Hamilton 3216; New Zealand; 37.7868°S 175.2964°E

Information
- Type: State boys-only, Secondary (Year 9–13) with Boarding Facilities
- Motto: Sapiens fortunam fingit sibi (A wise man carves his own fortune)
- Established: 1955
- Ministry of Education Institution no.: 131
- Headmaster: Jarred Williams
- Enrolment: 2,281
- Socio-economic decile: 7O
- Website: www.hbhs.school.nz

Hamilton Boys' High School (Māori: Te Kura Tamatāne o Kirikiriroa) is a boys' secondary school in Hamilton, New Zealand and is the largest secondary school in the Waikato region. The school was established as Hamilton High School in 1911 but was later split into separate boys' and girls' schools, with the current school opened in February 1955. Its sister school is Hamilton Girls' High School. The school crest features a lion, sash and star, and bears the motto "Sapiens Fortunam Fingit Sibi" which translates to "a wise man carves his own fortune". The school colours are black and red.

Most of the school's approximately 2400 students are day boys from Hamilton and surrounding townships such as Cambridge, Te Awamutu, and Morrinsville. Around 170 boys are housed in an onsite boarding hostel, Argyle House, which forms one of the six houses into which the school is divided. The boarding house is located on the school grounds, but is essentially a private institution, with students paying approximately $17,000 per year to attend.

In 1999, the school appointed Susan Hassall to head the school. In doing so the school became one of the first boys' schools in New Zealand to appoint a female headmaster.

== Enrolment ==
Like all previously selective state schools, Hamilton Boys' High School operates an enrolment scheme.

Enrolment was traditionally by academic examination followed by an interview. Alternatively a student might be enrolled if he had a family connection to the school. The school still examines new students but only for the purposes of streaming students.

As of July 2026, Hamilton Boys' High School has a roll of 2,281 students, of which 519 (22.8%) identify as Māori.

As of 2026, the school has an Equity Index of 429, placing it amongst schools whose students have few socioeconomic barriers to achievement (roughly equivalent to decile 7 under the former socio-economic decile system).

== Academic ==
The school offers both the state run NCEA and external Cambridge International Examinations for students to undertake.

== Sport ==
In rugby, Hamilton Boys’ High School has the best record in New Zealand at the National 1st XV. It has also won the international Sanix World Rugby Youth Invitational Tournament more than any other school.

Hamilton Boys’ High School has won the Maadi Cup for rowing eights 11 times, and the Springbok Shield for fours 16 times.

Hamilton Boys' High School competes as part of the Super Eight group of boys' high schools from eight provincial cities in the central North Island of New Zealand. Their 1st XV Rugby team has won the Super Eight Rugby 1st XV competition twelve times, as of 2019.

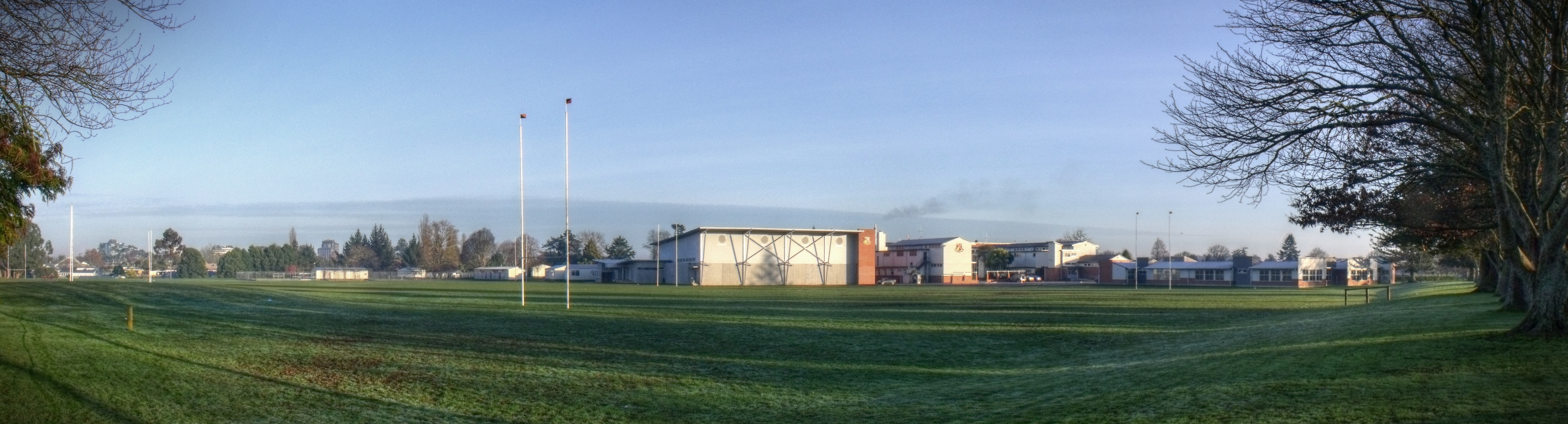
One of the school's fields, with the gym and main buildings visible behind.

== Houses ==
Hamilton Boys' High School currently has six houses. All of the day boy houses (all houses except Argyle House) are named after former headmasters of the school.

- Tait – Red
- Taylor – Green
- Wilson – Blue
- Steel – Grey
- Baigent – Yellow
- Argyle – Black

After every House competition, the new scores will be added to the previous scores. The House with the highest number of points at the end of the year gets to have its House name on the yearly House win list. No House has won more than twice consecutively.

== Notable alumni ==
As well as a number of All Blacks and All Whites, the following people are Old Boys of Hamilton Boys' High School:

=== The Arts ===
- Vincent Burke – film producer
- Daniel Gillies – actor
- Tony Martin – Australian-based comedian and writer
- Frank Sargeson – author
- Stan Walker – winner of Australian Idol
- Muroki – singer, songwriter & musician

=== Public Service ===
- Sir Colin Allan – former Governor of Seychelles
- Air Vice-Marshal Graham Lintott – Chief of the Royal New Zealand Air Force
- The Hon. John Luxton – Cabinet Minister 1990–1999
- Dr Shane Reti MP – MP and deputy leader, NZ National Party
- Doug Woolerton MP and former President, NZ First

=== Sport ===
- Craig Baird – multiple New Zealand and Australian motorsport champion
- Aled de Malmanche – former Chiefs (rugby union), Waikato Rugby Union and NZ All Black, now playing for Stade Français in France.
- Warren Gatland – former Waikato Rugby Union player and coach, coached the Wales national rugby union team from 2008 to 2019, former NZ All Black
- Daryl Halligan – ARL football player and TV commentator
- Ron Hemi – head boy at HBHS, former NZ All Black
- Tawera Kerr-Barlow – former New Zealand national under-20 rugby union team, Waikato Rugby Union, Chiefs (rugby union) and All Black player
- Josh Lord – current New Zealand All Black
- Scott McLeod – former NZ All Black
- Sean Maitland – former New Zealand national under-20 rugby union team, Canterbury Rugby Football Union, Crusaders (rugby union), Glasgow Warriors and current Saracens and Scottish Rugby Union player. Also played in the 2013 British & Irish Lions tour to Australia
- David Nyika – boxer
- Richard Petherick – current New Zealand Black Stick
- Dick Quax – Olympic Games silver medallist, 1976 5,000 metres and later world record holder 5,000m, Auckland City councillor
- Sam Rapira – Former New Zealand Warriors player and New Zealand national rugby league team representative
- Sevu Reece – current New Zealand All Black
- Trent Renata – Former Waikato Rugby Union and New Zealand national under-20 rugby union team, current Otago and Highlanders player
- Jake Robertson – Commonwealth games 5,000m and 10,000m finalist, 2014
- Zane Robertson – Olympic Games 10,000m finalist, 2016
- Mitchell Santner – current all-rounder for the New Zealand national cricket team.
- Aaron Scott – former All White NZ football player
- Caleb Shepherd – Former Olympic cosxswain
- Henry Speight – former Waikato and current ACT Brumbies player
- Scott Styris – former New Zealand Black Caps cricket player
- Dwayne Sweeney – Former Waikato, Chiefs Player, now plays rugby in Japan.
- Quinn Tupaea – current New Zealand All Black
- Chris van der Drift – former driver for New Zealand A1GP motor racing team
- BJ Watling – current New Zealand Black Caps cricket player
- Jackson Willison – Former New Zealand national under-20 rugby union team, Chiefs (rugby union) and Current Waikato Rugby Union, Blues (Super Rugby) and Māori All Blacks player
- Bryn Gatland – Rugby Union Player

=== Other ===
- Peter James Bethune – anti-whaling activist

== Headmasters ==
	Name	Term
1	Eben Wilson	1911–1937
2	Harold Tait	1938–1957
3	Aubrey Baigent	1958–1969
4	Richard Taylor	1970–1979
5	Tony Steel	1980–1989
6	James Bennett	1990–1999
7	Susan Hassall	1999–Apr 2024
8	Jarred Williams	Apr 2024–Present

== See also ==
- Hamilton Girls' High School
