= Hastings Boys' High School =

Location
- 800 Karamu Road South, Hastings, New Zealand; 39.6501°S 176.8357°E

Information
- Type: State single-sex boys, Secondary (Year 9–13)
- Motto: "Young men united by respect"
- Established: 1904
- Ministry of Education Institution no.: 227
- Headmaster: Mason Summerfield
- Enrolment: 755 (July 2026)
- Socio-economic decile: 2F
- Website: hastingsboys.school.nz

Hastings Boys' High School is a boys' secondary school in Hastings, New Zealand. The school is part of the Super 8. The school was founded in 1904 as Hastings High School. In 1922, it became Hastings Technical School under the leadership of William Penlington, who remained headmaster until 1949.

In the mid-1950s, the school split into Hastings Girls' High School and Hastings Boys' School. It has four Houses, Te Mata (red), Heretaunga (blue), Te Kahu (grey) and Manu Huia (black). These houses compete in many sporting events with each other throughout the year.

Students at Hastings Boys' High School organised a conference in 1999 to consider cloning the Huia, their school emblem. The Māori tribe Ngāti Huia agreed, in principle, to support the endeavour, which would be carried out at the University of Otago, and a California-based Internet start-up volunteered $100,000 of funding. The cloning did not ultimately take place.

== Headmasters ==
- L. F. Pegler: 1907–1922
- William Penlington: 1922–1949
- J. E. Tier: 1949–1964
- W. F. Crist: 1965–1984
- Graham Thomas: 1984–2002
- Rob Sturch: 2002–2023
- Mason Summerfield: 2024–Current

== Houses ==
Houses of Hastings Boys' High School
Te Mata	Named after the Heretaungan landmark, Te Mata Peak.
Heretaunga	Heretaunga is the original name of Hastings.
Te Kahu	Named after the hawk.
Manu Huia	Named after the huia bird.

== Notable alumni ==
- John Collinge – former president of the New Zealand National Party and High Commissioner to the United Kingdom
- Neil Dawson (born 1948) – sculptor
- Hika Elliot – All Black
- Bob Fenton (born 1923) – National MP for Hastings (1975–1978)
- Tohu Harris – NZ Kiwi's, Melbourne Storm
- Moana Jackson (1945–2022) – lawyer
- Sydney Jones (1894–1982) – National MP for Hastings (1949–1954)
- Phil Judd (born 1953) – composer, songwriter, musician, producer, performer and visual artist
- Josh Kronfeld – All Black
- Danny Lee – All Black
- George Lowe – mountaineer, including 1953 Everest expedition
- Ross McEwan – CEO National Australia Bank
- Hubert McLean – All Black
- Alby Mathewson – All Black
- Bruce Robertson – All Black
- Roger Randle – All Black
- Ernest Tacon – senior officer in the Royal Air Force
- Kevin Tamati – NZ Kiwi's
- Paora Winitana – NZ Breakers
