= List of Hurricanes (rugby union) players =

The following rugby union footballers have played for the Hurricanes in Super Rugby. This list includes any player that has played in a regular season match, semi-final or final for the Hurricanes, ordered by debut date and name. The Hurricanes were a foundation team in the 1996 Super 12 season.

== Players ==
No.	Name	Caps	Tries	C	P	DG	Points	Debut	Last
1	Bull Allen	30	5				25	01/03/1996	24/04/1998
2	Marty Berry	7	2	1	1		15	01/03/1996	27/04/1996
3	Jamie Cameron	7		14	21		91	01/03/1996	14/04/1996
4	Phil Coffin	22						01/03/1996	24/05/1997
5	Christian Cullen	85	56	8	3	1	308	01/03/1996	16/05/2003
6	Chresten Davis	20	2				10	01/03/1996	09/05/1998
7	Bruce Hansen	2						01/03/1996	15/03/1996
8	Norm Hewitt	66	2				10	01/03/1996	11/05/2001
9	Alama Ieremia	42	6				30	01/03/1996	12/05/2000
10	George Konia	7	1				5	01/03/1996	10/05/1996
11	Jon Preston	25	2	55	60		300	01/03/1996	16/05/1998
12	Roger Randle	5						01/03/1996	24/05/1997
13	Mike Russell	18						01/03/1996	24/05/1997
14	Dallas Seymour	8						01/03/1996	07/03/1997
15	Filo Tiatia	57	8				40	01/03/1996	11/05/2001
16	Tana Umaga	122	48				240	01/03/1996	05/05/2007
17	Dion Waller	65	1				5	01/03/1996	04/05/2002
18	Karl Williams	22	2				10	01/03/1996	16/05/1998
19	Rhys Duggan	7	2				10	09/03/1996	27/04/1996
20	Alex Telea	31	14				70	09/03/1996	10/04/1999
21	Bill Cavubati	19						24/03/1996	16/05/1998
22	Sam Doyle	2	1				5	24/03/1996	30/03/1996
23	Simon Mannix	5			2		6	24/03/1996	10/05/1996
24	Gordon Simpson	5						24/03/1996	27/04/1996
25	Inoke Afeaki	36	1				5	30/03/1996	11/05/2001
26	Joe Filemu	1						06/04/1996	06/04/1996
27	Richard Coventry	5						14/04/1996	10/05/1996
28	Neil Crowley	1						27/04/1996	27/04/1996
29	Jason O'Halloran	54	17				85	27/04/1996	11/05/2001
30	Daryl Williams	2						04/05/1996	10/05/1996
31	Stephen Bachop	21	3				15	28/02/1997	16/05/1998
32	Mark Cooksley	18	2				10	28/02/1997	07/05/1999
33	Jarrod Cunningham	12	2	2			14	28/02/1997	16/05/1998
34	Potu Leavasa	1						07/03/1997	07/03/1997
35	Mark Ranby	9						07/03/1997	24/05/1997
36	Richard Jarman	7						16/03/1997	16/05/1998
37	Martin Leslie	21	6				30	16/03/1997	16/05/1998
38	Finau Maka	12	3				15	16/03/1997	16/05/1998
39	Gordon Slater	56						16/03/1997	20/05/2005
40	Tala Leiasamaivao	6						12/04/1997	03/04/1998
41	Danny Lee	1						26/04/1997	26/04/1997
42	Kevin Barrett	14						02/05/1997	16/05/1998
43	Dean Anglesey	6						27/02/1998	19/04/1998
44	Doug Howlett	5	1				5	27/02/1998	16/05/1998
45	George Leaupepe	8	3				15	27/02/1998	16/05/1998
46	Glenn Taylor	11						27/02/1998	16/05/1998
47	Orcades Crawford	6						29/03/1998	16/05/1998
48	David Holwell	76	7	121	132		673	03/04/1998	27/05/2006
49	Mepi Faoagali	5	1				5	09/05/1998	04/05/2001
50	Andrew Blowers	11						27/02/1999	15/05/1999
51	Mike Edwards	11						27/02/1999	07/04/2000
52	Darryl Fale	2						27/02/1999	03/04/1999
53	Davin Heaps	16	1				5	27/02/1999	11/05/2001
54	Stu Loe	9						27/02/1999	15/05/1999
55	Glen Osborne	8	2				10	27/02/1999	15/05/1999
56	Reuben Parkinson	6						27/02/1999	25/04/1999
57	Ace Tiatia	1						27/02/1999	27/02/1999
58	Ofisa Tonu'u	9	1				5	27/02/1999	25/04/1999
59	Kupu Vanisi	43	1				5	27/02/1999	16/05/2003
60	Campbell Feather	31						07/03/1999	10/05/2002
61	Mal Arnold	9	2	3	5		31	13/03/1999	15/05/1999
62	Lio Falaniko	5						13/03/1999	15/05/1999
63	Damian Karauna	7						13/03/1999	15/05/1999
64	Jason Spice	64	9				45	13/03/1999	07/05/2004
65	Tama Tuirirangi	20						19/03/1999	16/05/2003
66	Orene Ai'i	2						16/04/1999	15/05/1999
67	Brad Fleming	18	5				25	25/04/1999	11/05/2001
68	Shane Carter	16						25/02/2000	10/05/2002
69	Gordon Falcon	4						25/02/2000	12/05/2000
70	Daryl Lilley	26	6	13	14		98	25/02/2000	10/05/2002
71	Jonah Lomu	29	11				55	25/02/2000	29/03/2003
72	Semo Sititi	5						25/02/2000	07/04/2000
73	Paul Tito	84	5				25	25/02/2000	05/05/2007
74	Joggie Viljoen	7						25/02/2000	07/05/2000
75	Kevin Yates	19	1				5	25/02/2000	04/05/2001
76	Tanner Vili	5	1	1			7	04/03/2000	27/04/2001
77	Paul Steinmetz	11	3				15	11/03/2000	11/05/2001
78	Matua Parkinson	5						18/03/2000	07/05/2000
79	Brent Thompson	28	1				5	18/03/2000	16/05/2003
80	Tony Coughlan	16	2				10	07/05/2000	10/05/2002
81	Jerry Collins	85	6	1			32	24/02/2001	24/05/2008
82	Rodney So'oialo	101	10				50	24/02/2001	14/05/2010
83	Brendan Haami	28	1				5	03/03/2001	27/05/2006
84	Tony Penn	27						11/05/2001	09/02/2007
85	Andy Slater	1						11/05/2001	11/05/2001
86	Pita Alatini	16	5				25	22/02/2002	09/05/2003
87	Luke Andrews	61						22/02/2002	05/05/2007
88	Lome Fa'atau	44	21				105	22/02/2002	05/05/2007
89	Riki Flutey	38	3	13	11		74	22/02/2002	13/05/2005
90	Andrew Hore	106	19				95	22/02/2002	18/06/2011
91	Shannon Paku	55	10		1		53	22/02/2002	16/05/2008
92	Milton Ngauamo	5						02/03/2002	10/05/2002
93	Bryce Robins	4	1				5	02/03/2002	10/05/2002
94	Jason Hooper	7						30/03/2002	09/05/2003
95	Neil Brew	3						22/02/2003	16/05/2003
96	Tim Fairbrother	59	1				5	22/02/2003	18/04/2009
97	Ross Kennedy	28	2				10	22/02/2003	13/05/2006
98	Chris Masoe	62	8				40	22/02/2003	24/05/2008
99	Ma'a Nonu	126	48				240	22/02/2003	04/07/2015
100	Kristian Ormsby	30	2				10	22/02/2003	22/04/2005
101	Brent Ward	26	13				65	22/02/2003	20/05/2005
102	Joe Ward	31	1				5	22/02/2003	20/05/2005
103	Daniel Smith	10						07/03/2003	16/05/2003
104	Sireli Bobo	5						21/02/2004	01/05/2004
105	Hosea Gear	70	26				130	21/02/2004	18/06/2011
106	Ben Herring	16	3				15	21/02/2004	20/05/2005
107	Joe McDonnell	31	1				5	21/02/2004	27/05/2006
108	Neemia Tialata	101	5				25	21/02/2004	18/06/2011
109	Tane Tuʻipulotu	34	5			1	28	21/02/2004	03/05/2008
110	Piri Weepu	84	4	45	45		245	28/02/2004	18/06/2011
111	Roy Kinikinilau	9	5				25	06/03/2004	07/05/2004
112	Thomas Waldrom	31	1				5	06/03/2004	20/03/2009
113	Conrad Smith	126	24				120	13/03/2004	04/07/2015
114	Isaac Boss	11	1				5	26/02/2005	13/05/2005
115	Jimmy Gopperth	51	8	71	57		353	26/02/2005	24/05/2008
116	Scott Waldrom	29	3				15	19/03/2005	14/05/2010
117	Justin Wilson	1						13/05/2005	13/05/2005
118	Jason Eaton	89	10				50	10/02/2006	17/05/2013
119	Luke Mahoney	9						10/02/2006	13/05/2006
120	Isaia Toeava	14	3				15	10/02/2006	27/05/2006
121	John Schwalger	84	3				15	18/02/2006	28/03/2014
122	Serge Lilo	18	3				15	04/03/2006	23/04/2011
123	Tamati Ellison	53	7				35	24/03/2006	14/05/2010
124	Cory Jane	121	32				160	03/02/2007	21/07/2017
125	Tone Kopelani	7						03/02/2007	17/03/2007
126	Nili Latu	3						03/02/2007	23/02/2007
127	Alby Mathewson	36	4				20	03/02/2007	22/05/2009
128	Brad Mika	10						03/02/2007	27/04/2007
129	Mahonri Schwalger	9						03/02/2007	05/05/2007
130	David Smith	36	12				60	03/02/2007	14/05/2010
131	Chris Smylie	43	2				10	03/02/2007	04/03/2017
132	Bernie Upton	11						03/02/2007	26/04/2008
133	Anthony Perenise	18	1				5	17/02/2007	18/06/2011
134	Hayden Hopgood	3						23/02/2007	17/03/2007
135	Blair Stewart	4		3	4		18	03/03/2007	24/03/2007
136	Hayden Triggs	1						03/03/2007	03/03/2007
137	Craig Clarke	14						16/02/2008	24/05/2008
138	Hika Elliot	12	1				5	16/02/2008	24/05/2008
139	Willie Ripia	29	1	31	30		157	16/02/2008	07/05/2010
140	Jeremy Thrush	110	10				50	16/02/2008	04/07/2015
141	Jacob Ellison	32						07/03/2008	10/06/2011
142	Zac Guildford	18	8				40	19/04/2008	16/05/2009
143	Brett Goodin	1						26/04/2008	26/04/2008
144	Dane Coles	140	29				145	14/02/2009	10/06/2023
145	Bryn Evans	25						14/02/2009	27/05/2011
146	Jason Kawau	12						14/02/2009	14/05/2010
147	Daniel Kirkpatrick	15	2	11	22		98	14/02/2009	31/03/2012
148	Faifili Levave	67	8				40	14/02/2009	31/05/2014
149	Karl Lowe	41	3				15	14/02/2009	12/07/2013
150	Ged Robinson	5						20/02/2009	16/05/2009
151	Victor Vito	100	12				60	20/02/2009	06/08/2016
152	Apisai Naikatini	3						07/03/2009	01/05/2009
153	Robbie Fruean	1						01/05/2009	01/05/2009
154	Nick Crosswell	9						12/02/2010	14/05/2010
155	Aaron Cruden	25	4	18	30		146	12/02/2010	18/06/2011
156	Michael Paterson	13	3				15	12/02/2010	14/05/2010
157	James Broadhurst	71	2				10	20/02/2010	04/07/2015
158	Tyson Keats	21	4				20	20/02/2010	10/06/2011
159	Andre Taylor	54	15	3	2		87	20/02/2010	24/05/2014
160	Alapati Leiua	49	9				45	06/03/2010	28/06/2014
161	Michael Bent	11						18/02/2011	21/04/2012
162	Chris Eaton	27	3				15	18/02/2011	13/07/2012
163	Jack Lam	53	3				15	18/02/2011	04/07/2014
164	Mark Reddish	29						18/02/2011	21/03/2014
165	Julian Savea	153	60				300	18/02/2011	27/05/2023
166	Jayden Hayward	15						12/03/2011	30/06/2012
167	Charlie Ngatai	11	1				5	12/03/2011	04/05/2012
168	Beauden Barrett	125	34	249	189	1	1238	16/04/2011	29/06/2019
169	Richard Buckman	3						04/06/2011	21/04/2012
170	Laurence Corlett	1						18/06/2011	18/06/2011
171	Tim Bateman	37	2				10	25/02/2012	04/07/2014
172	Motu Matu'u	48	3				15	25/02/2012	14/05/2016
173	Ben May	101	4				20	25/02/2012	26/02/2022
174	Tristan Moran	3						25/02/2012	31/03/2012
175	TJ Perenara	163	65	1			327	25/02/2012	15/06/2024
176	Brad Shields	143	15				75	25/02/2012	20/06/2026
177	Jeffery Toomaga-Allen	118	5				25	25/02/2012	29/06/2019
178	Tusi Pisi	17	1			1	8	06/04/2012	31/05/2013
179	Mike Coman	1						21/04/2012	21/04/2012
180	Reggie Goodes	60	7				35	28/04/2012	16/07/2016
181	Frae Wilson	4						30/06/2012	13/06/2015
182	Ben Franks	45	4				20	23/02/2013	04/07/2015
183	Rey Lee-Lo	24	1				5	23/02/2013	27/06/2015
184	James Marshall	54	7	17	6		87	08/03/2013	29/02/2020
185	Ash Dixon	15	1				5	15/03/2013	04/07/2014
186	Ardie Savea	131	32				160	06/04/2013	10/06/2023
187	Matt Proctor	66	12				60	26/04/2013	29/06/2019
188	Ope Peleseuma	1						12/07/2013	12/07/2013
189	Blade Thomson	51	11				55	12/07/2013	28/07/2018
190	Mark Abbott	47	6				30	22/02/2014	29/07/2017
191	Marty Banks	5		1	1		5	22/02/2014	21/03/2014
192	Chris Eves	86	2				10	22/02/2014	17/05/2019
193	Adam Hill	8						22/02/2014	26/04/2015
194	Hadleigh Parkes	6	1				5	22/02/2014	04/07/2014
195	Cardiff Vaega	1						07/03/2014	07/03/2014
196	Brendon Edmonds	1						18/04/2014	18/04/2014
197	Billy Guyton	1						03/05/2014	03/05/2014
198	Callum Gibbins	41	6				30	13/02/2015	29/07/2017
199	Brayden Mitchell	11						13/02/2015	27/06/2015
200	Jason Woodward	18	5	7	1		42	13/02/2015	06/08/2016
201	Nehe Milner-Skudder	36	8				40	27/02/2015	28/07/2018
202	Otere Black	22		21	4		54	27/03/2015	29/07/2017
203	Tolu Fahamokioa	1						23/05/2015	23/05/2015
204	Vaea Fifita	70	9				45	23/05/2015	11/04/2021
205	Willis Halaholo	18	2				10	23/05/2015	06/08/2016
206	Sam McNicol	1						13/06/2015	13/06/2015
207	Leni Apisai	19	3				15	26/02/2016	01/05/2022
208	Vince Aso	58	23				115	26/02/2016	28/05/2021
209	Jamison Gibson-Park	13						26/02/2016	06/08/2016
210	Ngani Laumape	85	49				245	26/02/2016	11/06/2021
211	Ricky Riccitelli	71	5				25	26/02/2016	05/06/2021
212	Loni Uhila	24	2				10	26/02/2016	29/07/2017
213	Michael Fatialofa	38	2				10	18/03/2016	28/07/2018
214	Geoff Cridge	1						25/03/2016	25/03/2016
215	Te Toiroa Tahuriorangi	11						25/03/2016	29/07/2017
216	Tony Lamborn	5						15/04/2016	06/08/2016
217	Wes Goosen	71	31				155	14/05/2016	04/06/2022
218	Mike Kainga	12						23/07/2016	09/06/2017
219	Jordie Barrett	125	33	200	93		846	25/02/2017	20/06/2026
220	James Blackwell	73	4				20	25/02/2017	10/06/2023
221	Reed Prinsep	74	6				30	25/02/2017	23/04/2022
222	Sam Lousi	28	2				10	18/03/2017	28/07/2018
223	Pita Ahki	1						01/04/2017	01/04/2017
224	Toa Halafihi	2						07/04/2017	13/05/2017
225	Ben Lam	50	32				160	21/04/2017	25/07/2020
226	Hugh Renton	1						20/05/2017	20/05/2017
227	Kemara Hauiti-Parapara	1						27/06/2017	27/06/2017
228	James O'Reilly	31	1				5	15/07/2017	15/06/2024
229	Fraser Armstrong	36						24/02/2018	30/04/2021
230	Jamie Booth	49	4				20	24/02/2018	10/06/2023
231	Murray Douglas	7						24/02/2018	01/06/2018
232	Gareth Evans	34	3				15	24/02/2018	05/06/2021
233	Toby Smith	21						24/02/2018	29/06/2019
234	Ihaia West	14		5	4		22	24/02/2018	28/07/2018
235	Alex Fidow	25	3				15	03/03/2018	12/04/2022
236	Jackson Garden-Bachop	31	1	6	8	1	44	03/03/2018	28/05/2022
237	Asafo Aumua	90	19				95	10/03/2018	20/06/2026
238	Richard Judd	21	1				5	10/03/2018	15/06/2024
239	Marcel Renata	2						10/03/2018	30/06/2018
240	Sam Henwood	10						30/03/2018	27/04/2019
241	Finlay Christie	14	1				5	27/04/2018	15/06/2019
242	Peter Umaga-Jensen	54	13				65	18/05/2018	07/06/2025
243	Jonah Lowe	4						25/05/2018	08/08/2020
244	Nathan Vella	1						25/05/2018	25/05/2018
245	Isaia Walker-Leawere	93	2				10	30/06/2018	20/06/2026
246	Du'Plessis Kirifi	106	16				80	16/02/2019	20/06/2026
247	Liam Mitchell	23						16/02/2019	11/06/2021
248	Xavier Numia	92	7				35	16/02/2019	20/06/2026
249	Billy Proctor	83	27				135	16/02/2019	20/06/2026
250	Fletcher Smith	13	2	9	1		31	16/02/2019	12/07/2020
251	Chase Tiatia	16	3	1			17	01/03/2019	15/08/2020
252	Heiden Bedwell-Curtis	2						15/03/2019	17/05/2019
253	Kane Le'aupepe	11	2				10	29/03/2019	08/08/2020
254	Salesi Rayasi	51	30				150	27/04/2019	15/06/2024
255	Ross Geldenhuys	5						10/05/2019	15/06/2019
256	Danny Toala	4						08/06/2019	11/06/2021
257	Devan Flanders	70	12				60	01/02/2020	20/06/2026
258	Tyrel Lomax	75	5				25	01/02/2020	20/06/2026
259	Tevita Mafileo	68	1				5	01/02/2020	29/05/2026
260	Pouri Rakete-Stones	61	3				15	01/02/2020	05/06/2026
261	Scott Scrafton	27						01/02/2020	21/05/2022
262	Jonathan Taumateine	9						29/02/2020	21/05/2021
263	Kobus van Wyk	8	8				40	29/02/2020	08/08/2020
264	Murphy Taramai	1						12/07/2020	12/07/2020
265	Luke Campbell	12	1				5	27/02/2021	11/06/2021
266	Orbyn Leger	6		1			2	20/03/2021	28/05/2021
267	Ruben Love	54	11	87	10		259	26/03/2021	20/06/2026
268	Cam Roigard	61	28				140	11/04/2021	20/06/2026
269	Brayden Iose	67	17				85	23/04/2021	20/06/2026
270	Pepesana Patafilo	2	1				5	30/04/2021	14/05/2021
271	Lolagi Visinia	1						21/05/2021	21/05/2021
272	Jacob Devery	25	4				20	19/02/2022	20/06/2026
273	Justin Sangster	26	3				15	19/02/2022	15/06/2024
274	Bailyn Sullivan	50	18				90	19/02/2022	29/05/2026
275	Blake Gibson	10	3				15	26/02/2022	04/06/2022
276	Caleb Delany	51	3				15	05/03/2022	13/06/2026
277	Logan Henry	2	1				5	05/03/2022	13/05/2023
278	Siua Maile	2	1				5	05/03/2022	21/05/2022
279	Raymond Tuputupu	25	4				20	05/03/2022	13/06/2026
280	Josh Moorby	54	38				190	25/03/2022	20/06/2026
281	Aidan Morgan	24	4	23	2		72	25/03/2022	17/05/2024
282	Tom Parsons	2						25/03/2022	12/04/2022
283	Teihorangi Walden	3						25/03/2022	28/05/2022
284	TK Howden	16						09/04/2022	24/05/2024
285	Pasilio Tosi	53	5				25	09/04/2022	20/06/2026
286	Bruce Kauika-Petersen	1						12/04/2022	12/04/2022
287	Kianu Kereru-Symes	4	1				5	12/04/2022	11/05/2024
288	Jared Proffit	1						12/04/2022	12/04/2022
289	Owen Franks	16						08/05/2022	10/06/2023
290	Riley Higgins	19	1				5	08/05/2022	13/03/2026
291	Tyler Laubscher	1						08/05/2022	08/05/2022
292	Harry Godfrey	15	3	12	7		60	25/02/2023	14/03/2025
293	Peter Lakai	51	13				65	25/02/2023	20/06/2026
294	Brett Cameron	25	3	52	10		149	11/03/2023	20/02/2026
295	Dominic Bird	5						17/03/2023	15/04/2023
296	Kini Naholo	39	27				135	17/03/2023	20/06/2026
297	Hame Faiva	5	2				10	25/03/2023	27/05/2023
298	Riley Hohepa	12		6	3		21	25/03/2023	03/05/2025
299	Hugo Plummer	13						02/04/2023	29/05/2026
300	Daniel Sinkinson	6						02/04/2023	23/05/2025
301	Jordi Viljoen	10	1				5	23/02/2024	29/05/2026
302	Veveni Lasaqa	1						03/03/2024	03/03/2024
303	James Tucker	5						09/03/2024	15/06/2024
304	Ngane Punivai	18	8				40	22/03/2024	05/06/2026
305	Ben Grant	5						19/04/2024	17/05/2024
306	Siale Lauaki	17	1				5	19/04/2024	20/06/2026
307	Fehi Fineanganofo	26	23				115	14/02/2025	20/06/2026
308	Callum Harkin	25	5	11	1		50	14/02/2025	20/06/2026
309	Ere Enari	27	4				20	14/02/2025	20/06/2026
310	Will Tucker	7						22/02/2025	31/05/2025
311	Kade Banks	2						01/03/2025	28/03/2025
312	Jone Rova	16	5				25	08/03/2025	20/06/2026
313	Nic Souchon	1						08/03/2025	08/03/2025
314	Zach Gallagher	9						14/03/2025	07/06/2025
315	Tjay Clarke	1	1				5	31/05/2025	31/05/2025
316	Warner Dearns	15	5				25	20/02/2026	20/06/2026
317	Arese Poliko	2						20/02/2026	29/05/2026
318	Matolu Petaia	2						20/02/2026	29/05/2026
319	Lucas Cashmore	6		2			4	28/02/2026	29/05/2026
320	Vernon Bason	3	1				5	20/03/2026	09/05/2026
321	Josh Gray	1						25/04/2026	25/04/2026
322	Tom Allen	2						23/05/2026	29/05/2026
323	Taniela Filimone	1						29/05/2026	29/05/2026
324	Cooper Flanders	1						29/05/2026	29/05/2026
325	Josh Timu	1						29/05/2026	29/05/2026
