= Potu =

Potu or POTU may refer to:

== People ==
- Potu Leavasa (born 1971), Samoan rugby union player
- Potu Leavasa Jr. (born 1996), Samoan rugby union player
- Potu Narsimha Reddy, Indian social reformer

== Places ==
- Potu, Goychay, Azerbaijan

== Other uses ==
- Potu (film), 2024 Bangladeshi film
- Potu (food), a traditional Chamorro rice cake
- Pershing Operational Test Unit

== See also ==
- Potoo
- Pottu
