= John Panting =

New Zealand sculptor (1940–1972)

John Panting (1940–1974) was an English-based New Zealand sculptor.

== History ==
Panting was born in Palmerston North and attended Palmerston North Boys' High School. In 1962 he graduated with honours from the University of Canterbury School of Fine Arts where he was taught by Tom Taylor and Eric Doudney among others. The following year he was awarded a three-year Government arts grant to train overseas and traveled to the UK.

== Teaching career ==
Panting was accepted into the Royal College of Art in 1964 where he studied alongside fellow New Zealander Stephen Furlonger. They both appear in a photograph by Lord Snowdon in the book about the British art scene, Private View. After graduating in 1966, Panting and Furlonger shared a studio space and ran a small basement gallery while Panting was asked to stay on as a lecturer in sculpture. In 1967 he began teaching at the Central School of Art and Design in London (now known as Central Saint Martins) and spent time in 1969 as a visiting lecturer at both Auckland and Christchurch University art schools. The New Zealand sculptor Neil Dawson remembers Panting's visit to the Canterbury University Art School as, 'just extraordinary...a human link with ideas that ranged the whole of the twentieth century but who also had a tangible link into Britain with Caro - a contemporary link with the Constructivists and Minimalists.' In 1972 Lund Humphries published Panting's book Sculpture in glass-fibre which was the first study of the use of polyester resin and glass-fibre in the production of sculpture. The same year he was appointed Head of the Sculpture at the Central School of Art and Design.

Panting died in a motor cycle accident near his studio in 1974.

== Selected exhibitions ==
Panting was exhibited by both dealer galleries and art museums through his short career. In 1972 he was selected for the major exhibition British Sculptors '72, curated by Bryan Kneale and shown at the Royal Academy. Here Panting was placed alongside leading artists of the time such as Kenneth Armitage, Barry Flanagan, Philip King and Eduardo Luigi Paolozzi. In a review the writer and curator John Wood described the exhibition as ‘groundbreaking’ Also in 1972 in New Zealand, the Manawatu Art Gallery organised the exhibition John Panting that was the subject of a nation-wide tour. Two years later he was included in Six New Zealand Artists which was first exhibited at New Zealand House in London. and then toured public galleries in New Zealand.

In 1975, a year after his death, the Serpentine Galleries mounted the survey exhibition John Panting 1940–74 with a catalogue published by the Arts Council of Great Britain. The exhibition was toured around New Zealand by the Arts Councils of Great Britain 1976–1977.

Panting was reintroduced to the public in 2005 by the Poussin Gallery established by the British painter Robin Greenwood in London. In 2013 the Poussin Gallery worked with Victoria University of Wellington's Adam Art Gallery and the British curator Sam Cornish to develop the exhibition John Panting Spatial Constructions.

A full list of Panting’s exhibitions is available in the publication John Panting: a Record of Structure.

== Collections ==
Panting's work is held in the permanent collection of the Tate Museum, Te Papa Tongarewa/Museum of New Zealand, Auckland Art Gallery, and the British Arts Council Collection.
