= H. W. Gretton =

New Zealand musician and writer

Harold William Gretton (16 March 1914 – 1983) was a New Zealand poet, lyricist, writer, teacher, journalist, linguist, diarist and Second World War soldier. In New Zealand, Gretton's tramping songs (popular between the 1950s and 1970s) are still well known today. His Second World War diary is also of note for its social history of military life, along with his soldier's poem 'Koru and Acanthus'.

== Life ==
Gretton grew up near Palmerston North on a dairy farm in Linton. He was the son of the farmer Thomas Henry Gretton and Margaret Gretton (née Geddes).

He attended Palmerston North Boys' High School and after Victoria University College (1935–1938). At Victoria, Gretton studied for his Bachelor of Arts degree and other interests included running, the University Tramping Club, and contributing to the annual student review, The Spike.

He found work as a copyholder and later cadet reporter for The Dominion before attending Wellington Teachers' Training College while he was also studying part-time at Victoria.

Gretton served in World War II. He was called up for military service in 1941 and served in the 2NZEF infantry. He was teaching at Manaia Primary School in Taranaki at the time of his call-up. In 1942, he became Registrar of the Births and Deaths of Maori at Waitapu.

At the conclusion of his service, Gretton returned to Victoria and teaching, and graduated with a Master of Arts degree in 1948. He next moved to the Bay of Plenty to teach at Rangitahi District High School in Murupara, but returned to Wellington in the 1950s to work at the Wellington Correspondence School, and after lived and taught for many years in Taupō at Taupo-nui-a-Tia College from 1962 to 1978.

Gretton married Derkje (Diana) Gretton (née Hof), who was Dutch.

He died in 1983 at the age of 69.

== Literary output ==
Gretton began writing poetry as a schoolboy at Palmerston North Boys' High School. By 1931, he could produce competent parodies of Romantic Scottish ballads.

He published much of his poetry and prose in The Spike: or, Victoria University College Review between 1935 and 1947.

In 1944, he co-edited (with Martyn Uren and J. L. Grimaldi) the February issue of the troopship magazine, Down the Hatch, which includes a number of sketches by Captain Peter McIntyre. The magazine was produced on Troopship 82 (Mooltan) which left New Zealand on 12 January 1944 carrying 11th Reinforcements.

In 1949, Gretton's poetry appeared in the third edition of the Victoria University College anthology, The Old Clay Patch. He also appears in the Glenco publication, Moa on Lambton Quay: Animal, Vegetable and Funereal Verse (1951).

He has tramping songs included in ephemeral songbooks such as the Tararua Songbook (1971) and collections distributed by New Zealand tramping clubs and student organisations. Gretton's songs were popular with these tramping organisations from the 1950s to the 1970s.

In 1967, Gretton's tramping songs were included in Shanties by the Way: A Selection of New Zealand Popular Songs and Ballads, collected and edited by Rona Bailey and Herbert Roth; with musical arrangements by Neil Colquhoun.

In 1984, his song 'A Fast Pair of Skis' appeared in A Thousand Mountains Shining: Stories From New Zealand's Mountain World edited by Ray Knox.

One privately published anthology of his writings, A Selection of Poems, Songs and Short Stories (c.1985), appeared after his death and printed at the Gisborne Herald. The only copy is held at the Victoria University of Wellington Library.

Gretton wrote in many forms, from popular songs and ballads to triolets and other forms of light verse.

Gretton also wrote one major post-Second World War soldier's poem, 'Koru and Acanthus', that he had plans for in Italy in 1945 and completed by 1946. It appears in The Spike 1947. The poem looks at the apocalyptic effects of war in Europe with reflections on New Zealand's future.

His papers consist of notebooks and a diary. The diary is a social history of the war period through the lens of a 2NZEF infantryman.

== Renewal of interest ==
In 1991, Les Cleveland included Gretton's 'No More Double Bunking' in The Great New Zealand Songbook; and Cleveland again mentions Gretton for his war poem 'Koru and Acanthus' in his essay on 'War Literature: World War 2' in the Oxford Companion to New Zealand Literature (1998).

Academics Harry Ricketts and Hugh Roberts further included seven of Gretton's comic verses and songs in their anthology of New Zealand comic and satiric verse, How You Doing? (1998). This can be seen as the first major inclusion of Gretton's work in a New Zealand anthology since the 1960s whose contributors date back to the 19th century.

In 2001, New Zealand poets and editors Bill Sewell and Lauris Edmond included two of Gretton's poems in their anthology of New Zealand poetry, Essential New Zealand Poems.

In 2002, Les Cleveland contributed an article on Gretton to New Zealand Books. Cleveland notes 'Gretton's poetry is energised by a wry, discerning wit and dexterous capacity for rhyme.' Cleveland's essay is the first significant article to appear discussing Gretton's critical neglect.

Cleveland notes further that: 'Today, Gretton is remembered by many of his generation as the composer of songs that celebrate the pleasures of the outdoors. H. W. Gretton's tramping songs 'A Fast Pair of Skis' and 'No More Double Bunking' are also included on the historical website NZ Folk Songs.

A poem by Gretton was included in Harry Ricketts, Paul Morris and Mike Grimshaw's Spirit Abroad: A Second Selection of New Zealand Spiritual Verse (2004).

Harry Ricketts in 99 Ways into New Zealand Poetry (2010) mentions Gretton in the chapter "Comic Verse".
