= Jeff Karika =

Cook Islands international rugby union player

- Born: Jeffrey Archer Karika
- Height: 1.78 m (5 ft 10 in)
- Weight: 85 kg (187 lb)

Rugby union career
- Position: Flanker
Provincial / State sides
Years	Team	Apps	(Points)
1992-1999	Hawke's Bay	53	(80)
1997-1998	Central Vikings	20	(35)
International career
Years	Team	Apps	(Points)
1997-1999	Cook Islands		

Jeffrey Archer Karika is a former New Zealand rugby player who played internationally for the Cook Islands.

== Biography ==
Karika made his debut in first-class rugby as a flanker for the Hawke's Bay team in 1992. He scored two tries in his first season. In the 1997 season he began playing for the Central Vikings, a combined team of Hawke's Bay and Manawatu. He was in the team that played the Vikings first ever game which was against the touring Fijian team. Towards the end of the 1998 season, he tore two-thirds of the ligaments off his left thumb in a round-robin game against Nelson Bays and was out of play for the rest of the season.

Karika was noted for his ability to outplay more established opposing openside flankers, despite being a lot shorter and a lot lighter than most flankers. His defensive work rate and ability to force turnovers was frequently recognised by rugby journalists. He had the nickname "Turbo" and played internationally for the Cook Islands team in the late 1990s, including qualification matches for the 1999 Rugby World Cup.

After retiring from playing, Karika was a development team coach for the Hawke's Bay Rugby Union.

His daughter Sarah won the gold medal for the under-19 girls beach relay team at the 2011 national surf lifesaving championships.
