= Colin Webster-Watson =

New Zealand sculptor and poet

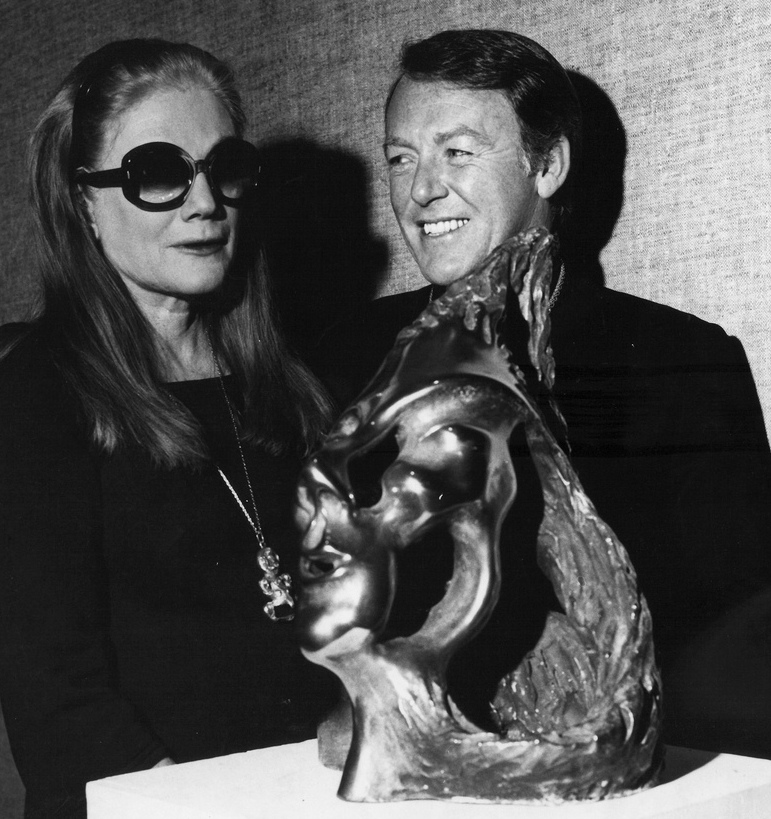
- Sarah Churchill with Colin Webster-Watson. New York. 1975.
- Born: Colin Webster-Watson; 6 May 1926; Palmerston North, New Zealand
- Died: 25 September 2007 (aged 81); Eastbourne, New Zealand
- Known for: Sculptor and Poet
- Patrons: Gloria Swanson, Carroll Baker, Morris West, Robert Ardrey, Harold Robbins

Colin Webster-Watson (6 May 1926, Palmerston North, New Zealand – 25 September 2007, Eastbourne) was a New Zealand sculptor and poet.

Webster-Watson (he hyphenated his name later in life) grew up in Palmerston North, where he attended Palmerston North Boys' High School. At the age of twenty, he traveled to Japan with the Commonwealth Occupation Force. While in Japan, his army superiors deemed that he would be better employed as an entertainer than a soldier, and gave him the responsibility to organise concerts for the troops.

In 1954, Webster-Watson moved to London to become a dancer and comedian at the Windmill Theatre. For a time, he also worked as a radio sports reporter in Wales.

Following the death of his father in 1960, Webster-Watson suffered a breakdown and moved to Italy. It was while running an orphanage in Alberobello that he discovered his love of sculpture and soon after established a studio in Rome. His patrons during this time included Gloria Swanson, Carroll Baker, Morris West, Robert Ardrey, Harold Robbins and Henry Rothschild. His work also graced the collection of Jacqueline Kennedy and Aristotle Onassis.

Webster-Watson married Jane Ewing in New York in the 1980s where they lived in Wainscott on Long Island.

In 1990, he moved to Palm Springs, California, where he lived until 2004 when he returned to New Zealand; he died in 2007.

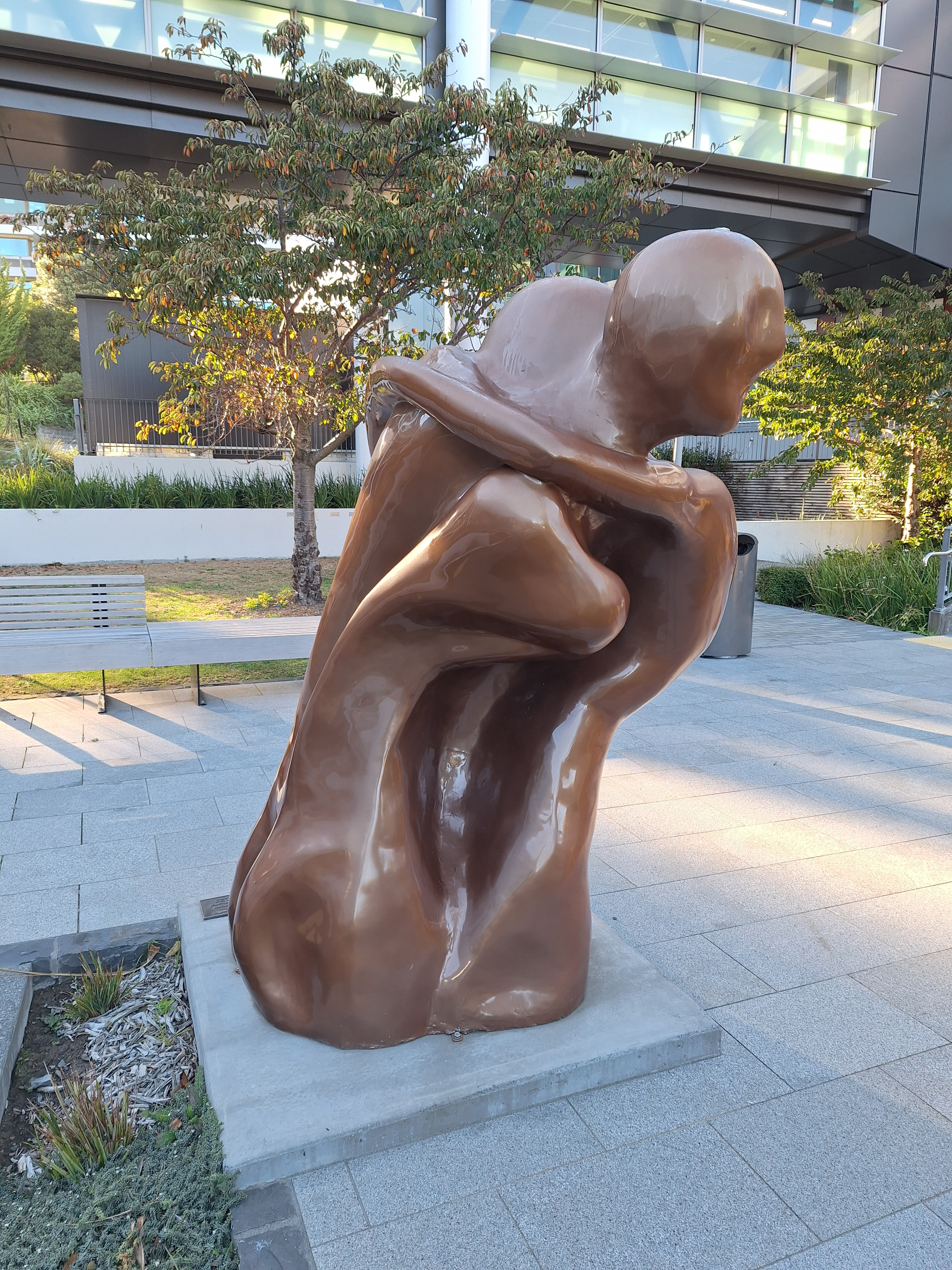
La Famiglia (the Family) sculpture at Wellington Hospital

Webster-Watson donated several works to Wellington including Tail of the Whale (Oriental Bay), Frenzy (Ōwhiro Bay), Prowling Cheetah (Wellington Zoo), Mountain of Dreams (Wellington Zoo), La Famiglia (Wellington Hospital).
