= Josh Bradnock =

- Born: 21 December 1982 (age 43) Masterton, New Zealand
- Height: 1.82 m (6 ft 0 in)
- Weight: 97 kg (15.3 st; 214 lb)
- School: Palmerston North Boys' High School
- University: Massey University

Rugby union career
- Position: Openside Flanker
Provincial / State sides
| Years | Team | Apps | (Points) |
| 2003-2011 | Manawatu | 56 | (30) |
Super Rugby
| Years | Team | Apps | (Points) |
| 2012 | Hurricanes | 5 | |

Josh Bradnock is a retired New Zealand Super Rugby rugby player. Bradnock captained the Manawatu Turbos in the Air New Zealand Cup. He was one of the top openside flankers in New Zealand rugby. Josh Bradnock was an exciting addition to 2009 Hurricanes squad by adding depth and enthusiasm to the loose forward stocks. However, injury severely limited his first season and eventually forced his early retirement from the game.

A former Hurricanes schoolboys star, Bradnock also missed most of the 2008 Air New Zealand Cup season with an Achilles tendon injury. The early part of 2009 saw his Hurricanes selection chances curtailed by the same injury. He worked his way back to provincial level but his Achilles went again while playing for Manawatu against Hawke's Bay in the 2009 ITM Cup. He subsequently retired in 2011, ending his playing days with 56 caps for Manawatu.

A member of the Crusaders' Wider Training squad in 2008, he was also ruled out of Super 14 contract contention that season due to a shoulder injury.

Bradnock is a former New Zealand Universities and Hurricanes Schools flanker and flew the flag as the sole Turbos representative in the 2009 Hurricanes team. Since retirement has continued to be involved in Manawatu Rugby both as a match commentator and member of the Manawatu Rugby Union Board of Directors.

== Background ==
Josh Bradnock is a former Hurricanes Schoolboys player, who played in the schoolboy team just as All Blacks Ma'a Nonu, Piri Weepu, and Neemia Tialata and Munster Rugby Star Lifeimi Mafi did. In 2007 he was selected as a New Zealand Universities representative. Bradnock has played 100+ games for Palmerston North rugby club Varsity, and 50 games for Manawatu during the 2008 Air NZ Cup. He was selected in the 2009 Hurricanes Super 14 team. He was an Old Boy of Palmerston North Boys' High School and a member of the school's Kia Ora club.
