= Brent Thompson (rugby union) =

- Full name: Brent Robert Thompson
- Born: 8 April 1978 (age 48) Manawatu, New Zealand
- Height: 191 cm (6 ft 3 in)
- Weight: 105 kg (231 lb)

Rugby union career
- Position: Loose forward
Provincial / State sides
Years	Team	Apps	(Points)
1998	Central Vikings	12	(20)
1999	Manawatu	7	(15)
2000–04	Taranaki	52	(80)
2009	Manawatu	11	(10)
Super Rugby
Years	Team	Apps	(Points)
2000–03	Hurricanes	28	(5)
2004	Blues	1	(0)

Brent Robert Thompson (born 8 April 1978) is a New Zealand former professional rugby union player.

Thompson is the son of 1960s Manawatu forward Francis Thompson and attended Palmerston North Boys' High School, where he had two in the 1st XV, which were coached by future Wallabies coach Joe Schmidt. He started life as a fullback, before moving up forward as a fifth form student. In 1999, Thompson represented NZ Colts, playing as a flanker.

After playing his early first-class rugby with the Central Vikings and Manawatu, Thompson switched to Taranaki in 2000 seeking a way into Super 14 contention and from 2000 to 2003 made 28 appearances for the Hurricanes, mostly off the bench. He then joined the Blues and played once during the 2004 Super 12 season.

Thompson competed with Japanese club Suntory Sungoliath between 2005 and 2007.

Returning to New Zealand, Thompson was player of the year for Manawatu in 2009, before a neck injury first suffered during his time in Japan forced him to announce his retirement.
