= Tom Taylor (sculptor) =

New Zealand sculptor and educator (1925–1994)

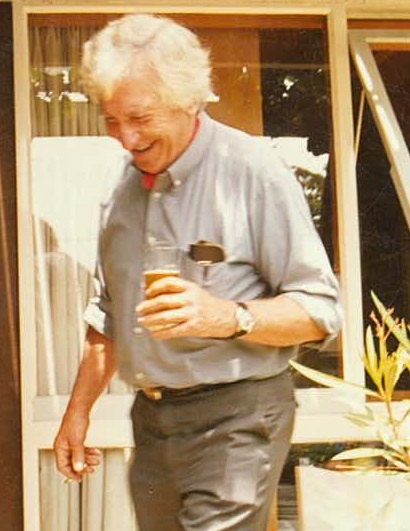
- Taylor in 1977
- Born: 7 May 1925; Christchurch
- Died: July 1994 (aged 69); Christchurch
- Education: Canterbury University College
- Known for: Teaching and sculpture
- Movement: Sculptural modernism

Thomas John Taylor (1925–1994) was a New Zealand sculptor and educator. He spent his life in Christchurch and became an influential lecturer at the University of Canterbury (UC; Māori: Te Whare Wānanga o Waitaha).

Taylor studied architecture followed by sculpture at UC's predecessor. He joined the UC School of Fine Arts in Ilam as a lecturer specialising in sculpture and later led the sculpture department for over 20 years. Taylor taught modernism but encouraged his students to explore other movements. Some of his students went on to become notable artists.

As a sculptor, Taylor's prolific early and sparse late periods were figurative and modernist. In between, he spent a decade producing abstract fusions of sculpture and architecture. Taylor also designed houses and theatre sets, and he organised in the Christchurch arts community.

Taylor's contribution to sculpture is generally regarded to be the artists he taught rather than the works he produced.

== Early life and education ==
Taylor was born in Christchurch on 7 May 1925. He completed his schooling at St Kevin's College, Oamaru. In 1939, while studying architectural drawing, Taylor passed the examination to enter university (or matriculated) at 14 1/2 years old. He worked as a draughtsman in the early years of World War II. From 1943 to 1945 Taylor served in the Royal New Zealand Navy as a surveyor in the East Indies. After the war he continued his studies at Canterbury University College. Taylor completed a degree in architectural construction in 1947, and he completed a diploma at the School of Fine Arts in 1952. Taylor studied figurative sculpture under Henry Eric John Doudney. (Note: Henry Eric John Doudney was called Eric in some sources, while others called him John.)

== Working life ==
=== Educator ===
Taylor spent the rest of his working life as an educator in Christchurch. He started as the art master of St Andrew's College, while he was also a part-time lecturer in architectural history at the university. In 1957 Canterbury University College became the University of Canterbury and the School of Fine Arts moved from the city centre to the suburb of Ilam. Taylor joined the school in 1960 as a lecturer specialising in sculpture. He led the sculpture department from 1969 until his retirement in January 1991.

As late as the mid-1980s Taylor taught and largely practiced modernism. But he was interested in his students's exploration of other movements and unconventional media. A history of art in Canterbury listed Taylor's students who became sculptors: Chris Booth, Neil Dawson, Rosemary Johnson, John Panting, Matt Pine, Phil Price, Pauline Rhodes, Carl Sydow, Bronwyn Taylor, Merylyn Tweedie and Boyd Webb. Interviewed in Christchurch newspaper The Press, Dawson remembered Taylor as a highly intelligent but tough sculpture and art history lecturer. He continued "[Taylor] set challenges which would last for the rest of your life, and you can't ask for more than that from your teacher."

Taylor continues to be generally regarded as an influential educator.

=== Sculptor ===
==== Periods ====
Taylor's early work was figurative and often in concrete (see Sculpture). By the mid-1960s he had the idea of fusing sculpture and architecture. In 1965 Taylor received the first Canterbury Society of Arts Guthrey Travel Award to visit Australia. (Note: Sources conflict on the year Taylor received the Canterbury Society of Arts (CSA) Guthrey Travel Award. According to Feeney (2008), a thesis on the CSA, it was 1965. But other sources give different years: 1964 and 1966.) He was inspired by the massive steel work of Clement Meadmore. For the next decade Taylor largely produced formal abstractions in steel.

In 1969 Taylor received a Queen Elizabeth II Arts Council travel grant. He visited Europe to study sculpture in bronze with Quinto Ghermandi and steel with Rudolf Hoflehner. On his return and without the knowledge of the University of Canterbury (UC) or the local authority, Taylor set up a foundry at the School of Fine Arts for casting bronze. It was later described as "... highly illegal ...".

In December 1973 Taylor's marriage ended in divorce and, in March 1975, a fire destroyed the UC sculpture block including Taylor's office. He completed his last known formal abstraction in 1976 then returned to figurative work. But Taylor only produced another two known works, both portrait heads, before he died in 1994.

==== Associations ====
Between the mid-1960s and early 1970s Taylor alternated between membership of the Canterbury Society of Arts (CSA) and The Group. He also helped to found two artists's groups: 20/20 Vision in the mid-1960s and The Sculptors' Group in the early 1970s (see Organiser). Taylor exhibited work with The Group, 20/20 Vision and the CSA (see Sculpture).

==== Critical evaluation ====
Few reviews of Taylor's sculptures have been found but those that have are positive.

Moraine (1967) was a freestanding sculpture and Taylor's first formal abstraction. It was composed of forms welded from sheet steel. The work is in the collection of Christchurch Art Gallery (CAG; Māori: Te Puna o Waiwhetū). They noted how the smooth finish hid the technique used to make it. In 1990 Taylor said it was his favourite work.

An architectural sculpture for the IBM Centre, Wellington (1971) was also composed of steel forms. At over 4 metres high by 5 metres long, it was Taylor's largest known work. Mounted in the portico at the front of the office block, vertical forms on the floor and ceiling curved to horizontal, merged then went through a gap in the glass curtain wall to end in the lobby. Architect Martin Hill sketched and reviewed the work for his Wellington Townscape column in The Dominion newspaper. He wrote it was "... a sensitively shaped vigorous form." which rewarded repeat viewing. It was removed c. 1980 and is presumed to have been destroyed.

Transit (1976) was another architectural sculpture and Taylor's last known formal abstraction. It was in the University of Auckland Medical School. Mounted in a stair landing with a window, it was made of sheet steel on beams running between the walls and ceiling. In his book New Zealand Sculpture: A History, art historian Michael Dunn wrote Transit was highly abstract and industrial looking. He noted how "... the beams appear to move in space, creating a contrast with the architecture and a frame for the view through the window ...".

W. A. Sutton C.B.E. (1991–1992) was a bronze head of Taylor's former School of Fine Arts colleague and close friend the painter better known as Bill Sutton. Produced during Taylor's retirement, it was his last known work. Also in the CAG collection, they described it as "... modelled in a loose, spontaneous style that gives the work a sense of liveliness and immediacy."

However, painter and art critic John Coley, who formed an artists's group with Taylor, and Dunn both wrote that Taylor's lasting contribution to sculpture was as an educator rather than a practitioner.

=== Designer ===
Although Taylor only had initial training in architecture, he designed four houses in and around Christchurch (see Houses). The most notable was a modernist house and studio for the painter Bill Sutton. Built in 1963 Sutton lived there until his death in 2000. It was one of the few houses in Richmond to survive the 2011 Christchurch earthquake. Owned by Christchurch City Council since 2019, it is used as an artist's residence. In 2022 Heritage New Zealand (Māori: Pouhere Taonga) listed Sutton House and Garden as a category one historic place of special or outstanding significance.

Between the early 1950s and early 1970s Taylor designed sets for seven theatrical productions (see Theatre sets). Three were works of Shakespeare performed by the University of Canterbury Drama Society under the direction of Taylor's friend the author Ngaio Marsh.

Taylor also worked on a few functional objects. He produced the lectern for the new modernist St Andrew's Church, Le Bons Bay, Canterbury opened in 1960. Taylor also designed the seats for spectators of the 1974 British Commonwealth Games, which were held in Christchurch.

=== Organiser ===
Taylor helped to found a number of art ventures, all based in Christchurch.

In 1964 John Coley and Taylor inspired contemporary artists interested in experimentation to form 20/20 Vision. The group held annual exhibitions until 1968.

Taylor and Carl Sydow, a former student of his, founded The Sculptors' Group in 1970. The group organised lectures and held three exhibitions, but it disbanded in 1972 when members moved from South to North Island or overseas for study or work opportunities. In the early 1970s Taylor also served on the council of the Canterbury Society of Arts.

In 1980 printmaker Jule Einhorn set up the Gingko Print Workshop and Gallery for Works on Paper with the help of Taylor and his School of Fine Arts colleague the printmaker Barry Cleavin. Gingko was in the Christchurch Arts Centre where Taylor served as a member of the board. The workshop closed in 1992.

== Personal life ==
Taylor and his wife Patricia, known as Paddy, had three children. They divorced in 1973 after Tom and his next partner Joan Livingstone began their relationship. The following year, Livingstone opened Labyrinth Gallery, a commercial art gallery in Christchurch city centre. It closed in the late 1970s. In Taylor's final years his partner was Jule Einhorn. Taylor died in July 1994 (aged 69).

== Works ==
=== Sculpture ===
Year	Title, subject or location	Type	Medium	Dimensions	Notes
1960	World War II airman in flying kit	Statue	Clay for concrete	10 ft 10 in (330 cm) tall	Commissioned for the Brevet Club, Christchurch. The model was completed. However, the sculpture was not cast as the mould had been damaged, and the club were concerned that the statue would become dated. See also Icarus falling (1964).
1962	John Baskcomb	Head	Plaster for bronze		Commissioned but not collected by the English character actor. Shown at The Group exhibition.
1963	Head of H. Winston Rhodes	Head	Concrete		Harold Winston Rhodes was a University of Canterbury (UC) lecturer in English. Shown at The Group exhibition. See also Harold Winston Rhodes (1989).
1964	Icarus falling	Bas-relief	Concrete		Commissioned for the Brevet Club, Christchurch. Viewable at Spitfire Square, Christchurch. See also Gallery.
1965	Echoing figure	Statue	Plaster	Life-size	Moulded from life. Shown at the first 20/20 Vision exhibition.
1966	Professor J.G.A. Pocock	Head	Plastic for bronze		Pocock was a political historian who studied and lectured at UC and its predecessors. Shown at the Canterbury Society of Arts (CSA) exhibition. Destroyed by the 1975 fire.
c. 1967	Sculpture of a girl		Plaster	120 cm × 25 cm × 20 cm (47.2 in × 9.8 in × 7.9 in)	Gifted to a friend. Now in the UC collection.
1967	Shakespeare	Memorial	Steel	13 ft × 3 ft (396 cm × 91 cm)	Commissioned by Ngaio Marsh for a theatre at UC. A 1964 design for concrete did not progress beyond a drawing and sketch model. The work in steel was etched with Shakespeare's portrait by Barry Cleavin. In 1990 Taylor said it was his least favourite work. Removed in the 1990s.
1967	Moraine	Freestanding	Steel	130 cm × 100 cm × 147 cm (51 in × 39 in × 58 in)	First formal abstraction. In 1990 Taylor said it was his favourite work. Bequeathed by Bill Sutton to Christchurch Art Gallery (CAG), it remains in their collection.
1967–1968	Tuarau	Freestanding	Steel	18 in × 15 in × 15 in (46 cm × 38 cm × 38 cm)	
1968	The Sum of the Squares	Freestanding	Steel	67.7 cm × 148.6 cm × 75 cm (26.7 in × 58.5 in × 29.5 in)	In the CAG collection.
1968	Climactic	Freestanding	Metal		Shown and offered for sale at The Group exhibition.
1968	St Ivo	Freestanding	Metal		Shown and offered for sale at The Group exhibition.
1971	IBM Centre, Wellington	Architectural	Steel	14.5 ft × 17 ft (440 cm × 520 cm)	Commissioned for 155–161 The Terrace, Wellington by owners A.M.P. Society, following an international competition. Reviewed. Removed c. 1980 and presumed destroyed.
1973	Palladian Subdivision	Installation	Multi-media		Located in a CSA gallery, a Palladian floor plan with piles of building materials later offered for sale in a mock auction. Conceptual and performance art.
1973	Queen Elizabeth II (QEII) Park, Christchurch	Fountain	Water		Commissioned for the 1974 British Commonwealth Games. Water arced into an artificial lake, just south of the QEII Stadium Sports Centre. Damaged beyond repair by the 2011 Christchurch earthquake, the stadium was demolished and the lake was filled in.
1976	Transit	Architectural	Steel	270 cm × 420 cm × 330 cm (110 in × 170 in × 130 in)	Commissioned for the University of Auckland Medical School. Reviewed. Last known formal abstraction.
1989	Harold Winston Rhodes	Head	Bronze	37 cm × 23 cm × 26 cm (14.6 in × 9.1 in × 10.2 in)	The model of the UC professor of English survived the 1975 fire. Cast as a memorial between 1987 and 1989. (Note: Sources conflict on the year the bronze head of Harold Winston Rhodes was completed. According to the Macmillan Brown Library it was 1973. According to other sources, the model was completed by 1975, but funds to cast the work were only found after Rhodes died in 1987. The model for this work may have been Head of H. Winston Rhodes (1963) in concrete. However, the whereabouts of that work is not known and there are no known dimensions for or photographs of it so a comparison cannot be made.) In the UC collection. See also Head of H. Winston Rhodes (1963).
1991–1992	W. A. Sutton C.B.E.	Head	Bronze	34 cm × 21 cm × 20 cm (13.4 in × 8.3 in × 7.9 in)	Produced during retirement. In the CAG collection.

The year of completion is not known for the following works: a head of Ngaio Marsh modelled c. 1975, Bust of Derrick Breach and Wave.

=== Houses ===
Year	Address	Notes
1950	6 Sherwood Lane, Cashmere, Christchurch	An art deco house.
1963	20 Templar Street, Richmond, Christchurch	Better known as Sutton House and Garden.
1968	23 Merlincote Crescent, Governors Bay, Canterbury	For author Margaret Mahy who lived there until her death in 2012.
Late 1980s	2202 West Coast Road, Kirwee, Canterbury	For a friend of Taylor's who built the house.

Sources conflict on whether Taylor designed a house and studio on Gloucester Street, Christchurch for his School of Fine Arts colleague the painter and potter Doris Lusk.

=== Theatre sets ===
Year	Work	Produced by
1953	Shakespeare, Julius Caesar	Canterbury University College Drama Society and Ngaio Marsh
1960	Edward Wooll, Libel!	St Andrew's College, Christchurch
1964	Shakespeare, Julius Caesar	University of Canterbury (UC) Drama Society and Marsh
1967	Shakespeare, Twelfth Night	UC Drama Society and Marsh
1972	Henry Purcell, The Fairy-Queen	UC School of Music
1972	Shakespeare, Henry V	Marsh
1972	Henrik Ibsen, Peer Gynt	UC Drama Society

== Gallery ==
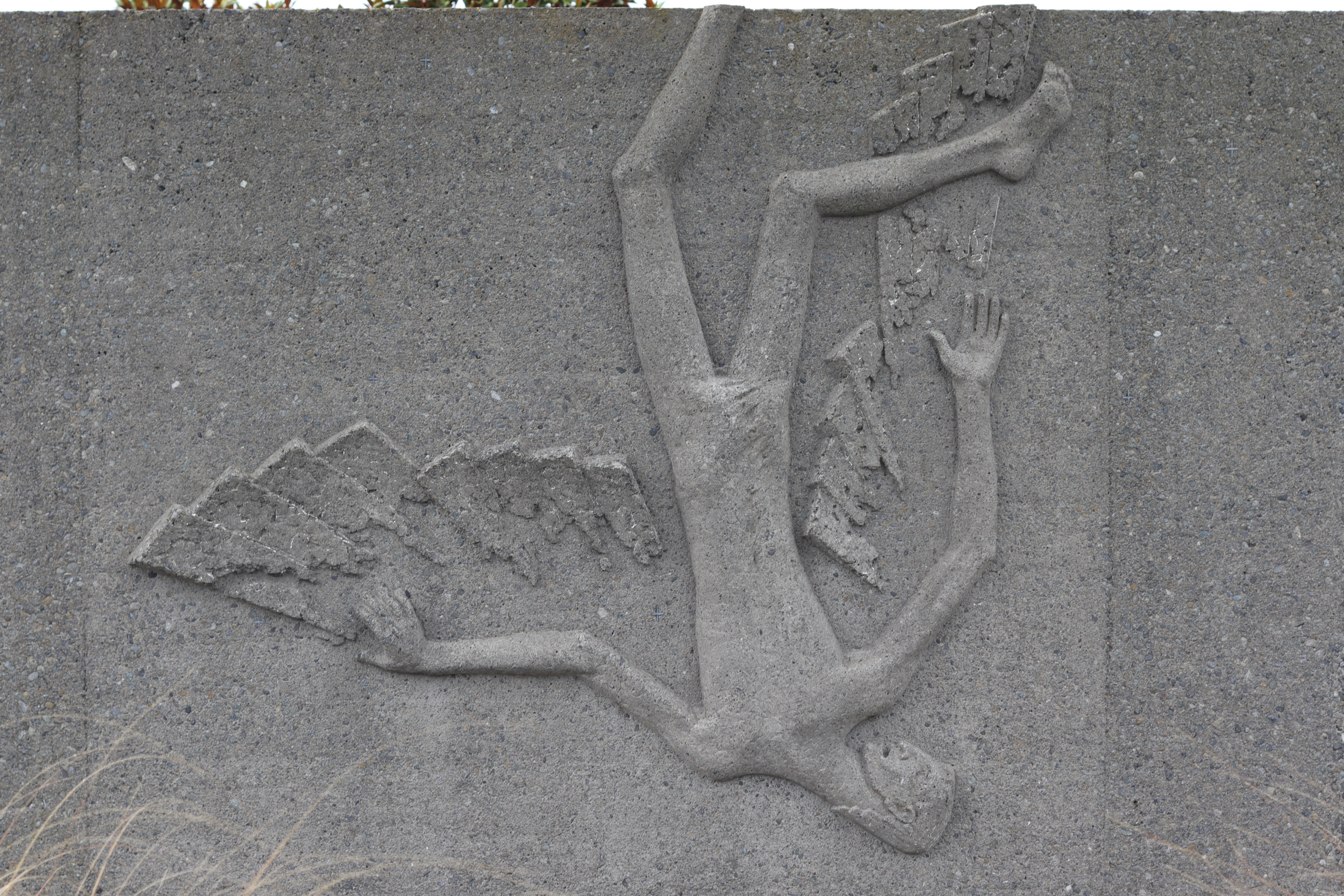
Tom Taylor, Icarus falling. c. 1964. Bas-relief in concrete. Spitfire Square, Christchurch.
