= Mark Finlay =

New Zealand rugby union player

- Born: Mark Clayton Finlay; 10 May 1963 (age 63) Palmerston North, New Zealand
- Height: 1.83 m (6 ft 0 in)
- Weight: 89 kg (196 lb)
- School: Palmerston North Boys' High School
- Occupation: Early childhood education centre owner

Rugby union career
- Position: Fullback
Senior career
Years	Team	Apps	(Points)
19??-88	Viadana		
1988-94	Isetan		
1994-??	Sanix		
Provincial / State sides
Years	Team	Apps	(Points)
1981–86	Manawatu	71	(511)
1988	North Harbour	13	
International career
Years	Team	Apps	(Points)
1984	New Zealand	0	(0)

Mark Clayton Finlay (born 10 May 1963) is a former New Zealand rugby union player. He was educated at Palmerston North Boys' High School, where he was a member of the 1st XV between 1979 and 1981. A fullback, Finlay represented Manawatu and North Harbour at a provincial level, and was a member of the New Zealand national side, the All Blacks, in 1984. He played two matches for the All Blacks where he scored a total of 18 points (2 tries, 5 conversions), but made no test appearances.
