= Reece Robinson (rugby union, born 1977) =

NZ rugby union player

- Full name: Reece Anthony Robinson
- Born: 18 December 1977 (age 48)
- Height: 196 cm (6 ft 5 in)
- Weight: 110 kg (243 lb)
- School: Tararua College
- Notable relative: Mark Robinson (cousin)

Rugby union career
- Position: Lock
Provincial / State sides
Years	Team	Apps	(Points)
1998	Central Vikings	13	(10)
1998–01	Hawke's Bay	30	(20)
2002–04	Taranaki	28	(20)
2009–12	Manawatu	39	(15)
Super Rugby
Years	Team	Apps	(Points)
2003	Chiefs	8	(0)

Reece Anthony Robinson (born 18 December 1977) is a New Zealand former professional rugby union player.

== Biography ==
Robinson was raised in Eketāhuna in the Manawatū-Whanganui region and attended Tararua College. He is of Maori descent on his mother's side and is cousin of All Blacks halfback Mark Robinson.

=== Rugby career ===
A New Zealand Colt, Robinson competed mostly in the second row and occasionally as a flanker during his career. His early senior rugby was played with the short-lived Central Vikings and for Hawke's Bay, where he won the 2001 NPC Division Two Player of the Year award. He was part of New Zealand Maori tours to Argentina in 2001 and Australia in 2002. While playing with Taranaki, Robinson was called up by the Chiefs in 2003 and featured eight times during their Super 12 campaign. He had several seasons in Japanese rugby with the Mitsubishi Dynaboars and played with Manawatu on his return home, before retiring in 2012 at the age of 34.

=== Coaching ===
Robinson coached the Palmerston North Old Boys Marist Premier team, winning the Manawatu club championship in 2017 and a losing finalist in 2022. He also coached the Manawatu Development team and the Manawatu Under 19 teams.

In the 2023 and 2024 seasons Robinson coached Wairarapa Bush in the Heartland Championship. In the 2023 Heartland Championship Wairarapa Bush placed 6th in the round-robin stage and made the semi-finals of the Lochore Cup but lost 27-33 to West Coast Rugby Football Union. He stood down after the 2024 season in which Wairarapa Bush placed 10th in the round-robin stage, not progressing to the Lochore Cup.
