= Palmerston North Boys' High School =

School in New Zealand

- Crest of Palmerston North Boys' High School

Location
- 263 Featherston St, Palmerston North, New Zealand; 40.3485°S 175.6073°E

Information
- Other names: PNBHS, Palmy Boys'
- Type: State, Single-sex, Secondary (Years 9-13), Day & Boarding
- Motto: Nihil Boni Sine Labore commonly translated as 'Nothing Achieved Without Hard Work'
- Established: 1902; 124 years ago
- Sister school: Palmerston North Girls' High School
- Ministry of Education Institution no.: 202
- Rector: David M. Bovey
- Grades: 9–13
- Gender: Boys
- Enrolment: 1,821 (July 2026)
- Socio-economic decile: 8P
- Website: pnbhs.school.nz

Palmerston North Boys' High School is a secondary day and boarding school for boys founded in 1902. It is located in Palmerston North, New Zealand.

== Location ==
Palmerston North Boys' High School has a campus located on Featherston Street between Rangitikei and North Streets in the central city. There are secondary entrances to the school on Wellesbourne Street, Ivanhoe Terrace, Edgeware Road and North Street. The rear boundary is shared with Queen Elizabeth College.

== Students and school culture ==
Most of the school's approximately 1,700 students are "day boys" from Palmerston North and surrounding townships such as Ashhurst, Levin, and Feilding. Around 180 boys are housed in an onsite boarding hostel – College House (also known as 'Murray House,' after former Rector John Murray; his former home is part of the hostel).

As of July 2026, Palmerston North Boys' High School has a roll of 1,821 students, of which 443 (24.3%) identify as Māori.

As of 2026, the school has an Equity Index of 441, placing it amongst schools whose students have below average socioeconomic barriers to achievement (roughly equivalent to decile 7 under the former socio-economic decile system).

== History and controversy ==
In 1902, Palmerston North High School was established by Scottish Presbyterian elders as a co-educational secondary school with an initial roll of 84 students (40 boys and 44 girls). The first classes were held at St Andrew's Presbyterian Church Sunday School hall. In 1920, Palmerston North High School was split into two single-sex schools: Palmerston North Girls' High School and Palmerston North Boys' High School.

In a 1990 case, M & R v Syms and the Board of Trustees of Palmerston North Boys High School [2003] NZAR 705, the plaintiffs challenged the steps taken by the rector in suspending both students for consumption of alcohol, and later by the board expelling M. McGechan J gave judgment for the plaintiffs holding that the rector's discretion as to whether to suspend the pupils "is not to be ignored, as if non-existent. Nor is it to be fettered by a principal through self-imposed rules permitting no exceptions". The judge further found that the board did not exercise its mind on the ultimate discretion whether or not to uplift suspension or procure removal.

In September 2006 the school had an outbreak of tuberculosis in which a substantial number of students contracted a latent form of tuberculosis, as well as a small number of students who had active tuberculosis. There was a second, smaller outbreak in 2010.

The then-rector, Tim O'Connor, was awarded a Woolf Fisher Fellowship and the Sir Peter Blake Leadership Award in 2007.

In August 2017 the school was hit with media attention as a year 12 student was denied access to the ball as he did not have a partner to go with.

=== Rectors ===
The school has had ten rectors since 1902:

Period	Rector
1902	William Gray
1902–1918	John E. Vernon
1919–1946	John Murray
1947–1954	O. J. Begg
1954–1963	Edward S. Craven
1963–1970	Percy A. Muirhead
1971–1987	Eric D. P. White
1987–2002	D. A. Syms
2002–2012	T. M. O'Connor
2012–present	D. M. Bovey

== Facilities ==
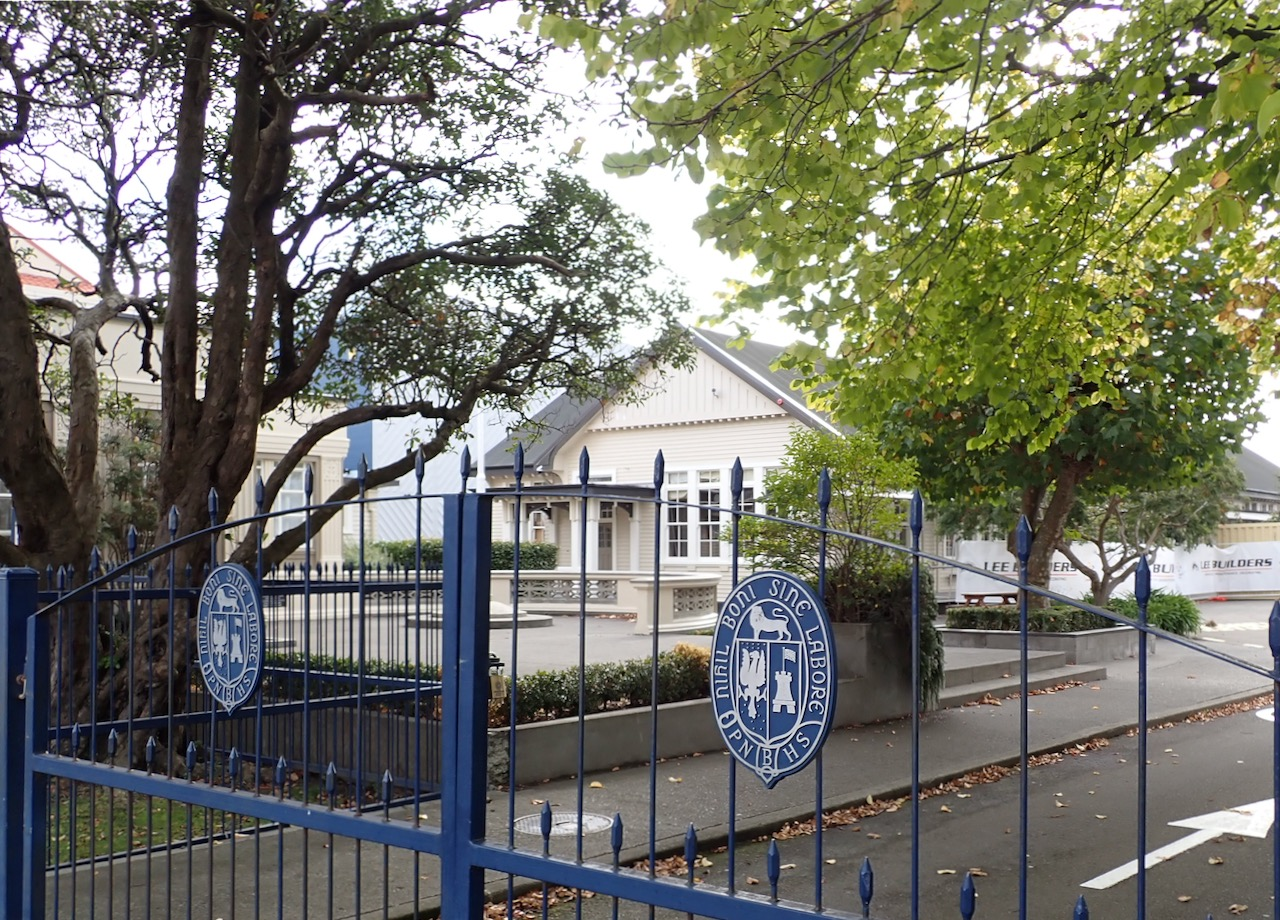
Palmerston North Boys' High School at the main entrance

The school has the following facilities:

These include:

- Library
- ICT computer suites
- Specialised technology/workshop block
- College House – Boarding facilities for approximately 180 students
- War Memorial Gallery and archive room

The school has 12 main teaching blocks.

=== College House ===
College House is a boarding facility for approximately 180 students College House provides seven day boarding for students that attend Palmerston North Boys' High School. Seven day boarding means that students can remain in the hostel during the weekends. Parents apply for weekend leave to allow their sons to go home in any given weekend.

=== Cultural ===
- Ian Colquhoun Memorial Hall – 1700-seat auditorium
- The Speirs Centre

- Recording facilities
- Rehearsal rooms
- David A. Syms Auditorium – 400-seat theatre

- Little Theatre – 80-seat theatre

=== Sporting ===
- Two multiuse gymnasiums
- Full-sized basketball court
- Weights room
- Heated indoor swimming pool
- Two rugby fields
- Football field
- Three artificial cricket wickets and a grass wicket
- Cricket training nets
- Astroturf all-weather tennis and hockey courts
- Two sports pavilions
- Grandstand

== Clubs ==
Palmerston North Boys' High School is divided into six 'clubs'. On enrolment students are placed in a club at random, or into a house with a family tie. Staff are also placed in clubs, with the exception of the Rector.

The clubs names and colours are as follows:

Colours	Name	Reason for name
	Albion	Named for the founding club secretary
	Gordon	Named for the founding club secretary
	Kia Ora	The reason for this name unknown. See: Kia Ora.
	Murray	Named for former Rector Mr John Murray
	Phoenix	Named for the Phoenix on the school crest
	Vernon	Named for the school's second Rector, Mr J. Vernon

Murray Club, also known as College House, is composed of the school's boarding students.

The Clubs compete in sports and codes, including team sports, individual sports, and whole club activities, such as Road-Race and Marching competitions. For each code the clubs are ranked first to last, with the winning club gaining one point, and the loser gaining six. The club with the fewest points at the end of the school year wins the Shand Shield.

== Sports ==
The school has experienced success nationally in sports such as football, cycling, badminton, squash, basketball, hockey and rugby.

The rugby union 1st XV plays in an all-white strip. Other rugby teams from Boys' High are likely to play in blue and white hooped jerseys, similar to Auckland or St Kentigern College.

== Notable alumni ==
=== Sport ===
==== Basketball ====
- Jake McKinlay – Manawatu Jets and Junior Tall Blacks

==== Cricket ====
- Dane Cleaver – Black Caps
- Jamie How – Black Caps
- Adam Milne – Black Caps
- Jacob Oram – Black Caps
- David O'Sullivan – Black Caps
- Victor Pollard – Black Caps and All White
- Mathew Sinclair – Black Caps
- Ian Smith – Black Caps and commentator
- Derek Stirling – Black Caps
- Ross Taylor – Black Caps
- George Worker – Black Caps
- Bryan Yuile – Black Caps

==== Cycling ====
- Jesse Sergent – Olympic bronze medalist
- Simon van Velthooven – Olympic bronze medalist
- Campbell Stewart - Olympic silver medalist

==== Football ====
- Stu Jacobs – All Whites, New Zealand Olympic coach
- Steven Old – All Whites
- Jarrod Smith – All Whites
- Alex Rufer – All Whites
- Adrian Elrick – All Whites
- Elijah Just – All Whites

==== Golf ====
- Craig Perks – former PGA tour golfer

==== Hockey ====
- Nick Wilson – Black Sticks
- Hayden Phillips – Black Sticks

==== Kayaking ====
- Ian Ferguson – Olympic gold medalist
- Ben Fouhy – Olympic silver medalist

==== Motor Racing ====
- Brendon Hartley – 2015 FIA World Endurance Championship
- Jono Lester – Japanese Super GT
- Chris Pither – V8 Supercars

==== Rugby ====
- Kurt Baker – IRB Sevens player, Manawatu and Taranaki representative
- Josh Bradnock – Hurricanes
- Francis Bryant – Manawatu Turbos
- Dean Budd – Italy, Benetton
- Craig Clare – Manawatu, Otago, Highlanders, Bay of Plenty
- Aaron Cruden – All Blacks
- Jason Eaton – All Blacks
- Jason Emery – Manawatu Turbos, Highlanders
- Ma'afu Fia – Highlanders
- Mark Finlay – All Blacks
- Ben Funnell – Crusaders
- Hamish Gard – Canterbury
- Jackson Hemopo – All Blacks, Highlanders, Manawatu Turbos
- Emosi Koloto – Manawatu, Wellington and Tonga
- Ngani Laumape – All Blacks, Hurricanes, Manawatu Turbos
- Johnny Leota – Highlanders
- Lifeimi Mafi – Munster
- Hadleigh Parkes – Scarlets, Southern Kings, Welsh Grand Slam Winner.
- Liam Squire – All Blacks, Highlanders, Tasman Mako
- Andre Taylor – New Zealand Maori
- Jade Te Rure – Manawatu Turbos, Edinburgh
- Brent Thompson – Hurricanes
- Rob Thompson – Canterbury, Highlanders, Maori All Blacks
- Doug Tietjens – Highlanders
- Grant Webb – Newport Gwent Dragons
- Craig Wickes – All Blacks
- Ruben Love - Wellington, Hurricanes, All Blacks
- Eli Oudenryn - Blues, Tasman
- Logan Wallace - Hurricanes, Manawatu

==== Rugby League ====
- Emosi Koloto – New Zealand Kiwis
- Ngani Laumape – New Zealand Warriors (rugby league), Hurricanes, Manawatu (rugby union), All Blacks

=== Politics and public service ===
- Harold Barrowclough (1894–1972), Chief Justice of New Zealand (1953–1966)
- Douglas Carter (1908–1988), National MP representing the Raglan electorate
- Trevor de Cleene (1933–2001), Labour MP representing the Palmerston North electorate
- Gaven Donne (1914–2010), Chief Justice of Samoa, Niue, the Cook Islands, Nauru and Tuvalu
- Jonathan Hunt (1938-2024), Speaker of the House and High Commissioner to the United Kingdom
- Major-General Brian Poananga (1924–1995), Chief of the General Staff, New Zealand Army
- Grant Smith, Mayor of Palmerston North (2015–present).
- Tim Costley (born 1979/1980), National MP representing the Ōtaki electorate

=== Television ===
- Shane Cortese – NZ theatre and TV actor
- Peter Land – UK theatre and TV actor
- Hamish McKay – NZ television presenter
- Richard Wilkins – television presenter
- Jed Brophy – TV and film actor – Lord of the Rings
- Clarke Gayford – Fisherman and TV personality
- Jeremy Corbett – TV presenter – Comedian

=== Other ===
- H. W. Gretton – poet, lyricist, teacher, journalist, diarist and soldier
- Simon Grigg – music industry entrepreneur, archivist and writer
- Aaron Hape – Fellow of the Royal Society of Arts
- Fred Hollows – ophthalmologist
- Bob McDowall – freshwater fish scientist
- Barry Mora – opera singer
- Simon Moutter – CEO of Spark NZ
- John Panting – artist
- David Shand – International Civil servant
- Colin Webster-Watson – artist
- Guthrie Wilson – novelist and educator
- Gregor W. Yeates – scientist

== See also ==
- Palmerston North Girls' High School
