= The Chalice =

Sculpture in Christchurch, New Zealand

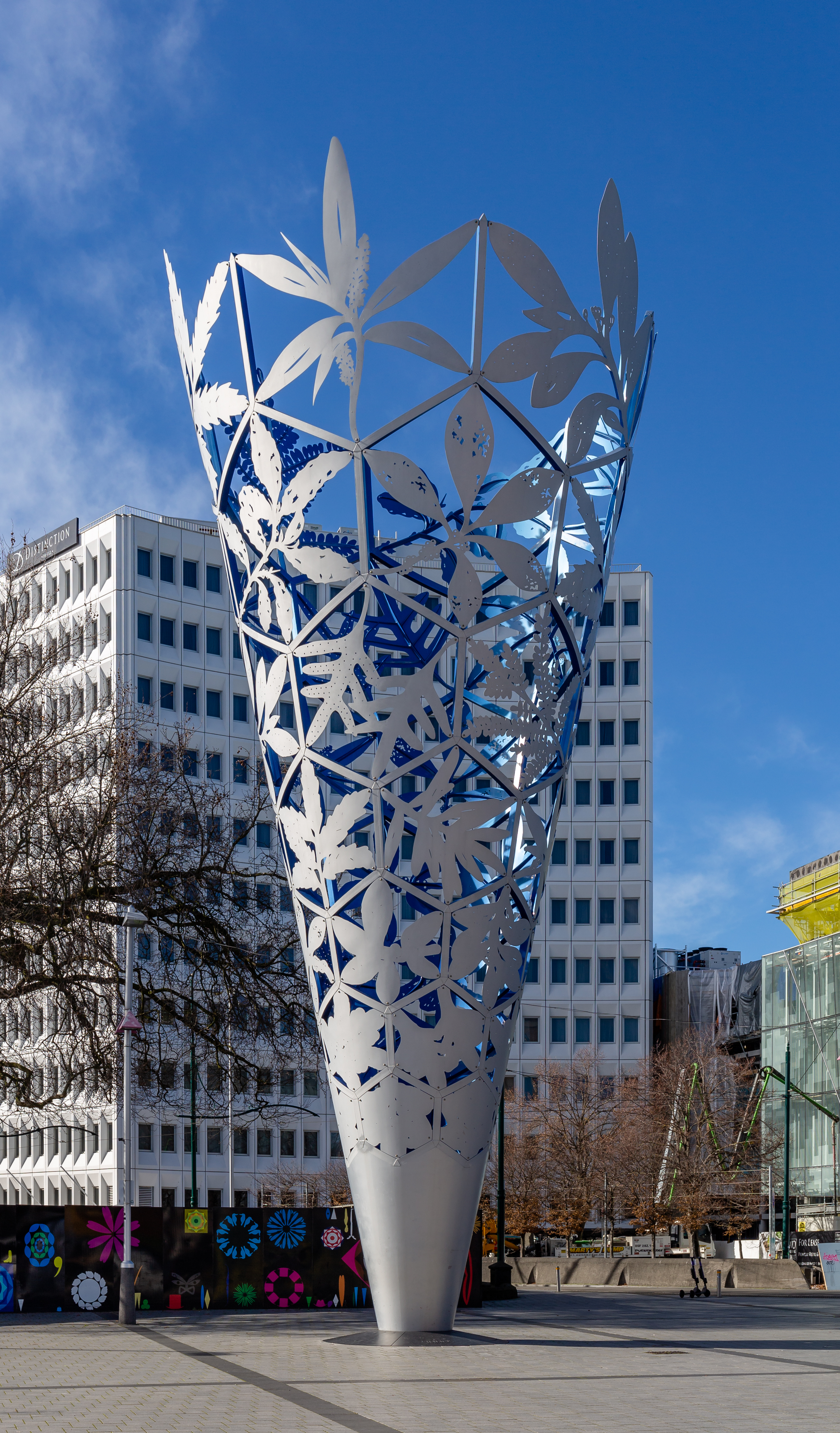
- The Chalice in 2019
- Artist: Neil Dawson
- Year: 2001
- Dimensions: 18 m (59 ft)
- Location: Christchurch, New Zealand
- 43°31′52.90″S 172°38′11.34″E

The Chalice is a sculpture in Cathedral Square, Christchurch, New Zealand. Designed by sculptor Neil Dawson, it was created to mark the 150th anniversary of the settlement of Canterbury, and installed in the square in 2001. The conical sculpture features the leaves of New Zealand native plants.

== Design ==
The Chalice was designed by sculptor Neil Dawson and is 18 metres tall. It is the shape of a cone, with its diameter at the ground being 2 metres and at the top 8.5 metres. It has steel hexagons with aluminium leaf patterns of native plants within them. The exterior is painted silver and the interior blue. The shape of the sculpture was made to reflect the shape of the spire of Christ Church Cathedral.

== History ==
The Chalice was made to celebrate the 150th anniversary of the settlement of Canterbury and was placed in Cathedral Square in 2001 at a cost of $400,000. Shortly after the sculpture's lighting ceremony on 10 September 2001, the September 11 attacks occurred and the Chalice became a location where the local community placed flowers and messages for the victims of the attacks.

When the 2011 Christchurch earthquake occurred, the Chalice was not damaged, unlike other structures in Cathedral Square, such as Christ Church Cathedral which lost its spire. At the time Dawson said, for this reason, that the sculpture "could become a sign of the recovery rather than a sign of the quake".

In March 2025 restoration began on the Chalice with a budget of $400,000. It involved temporarily removing the leaves for repainting, placing scaffolding around the structure and wrapping it to protect it from dust and the weather. The lighting was also replaced and corrosion was fixed. Christchurch City councillor James Gough criticised the cost and called for an "immediate halt" on the work, saying that the funds would be better allocated to "roads, footpaths and essential core services". The restoration was part of the council's long term plan and had been approved by a "delegated authority" however.

== Gallery ==
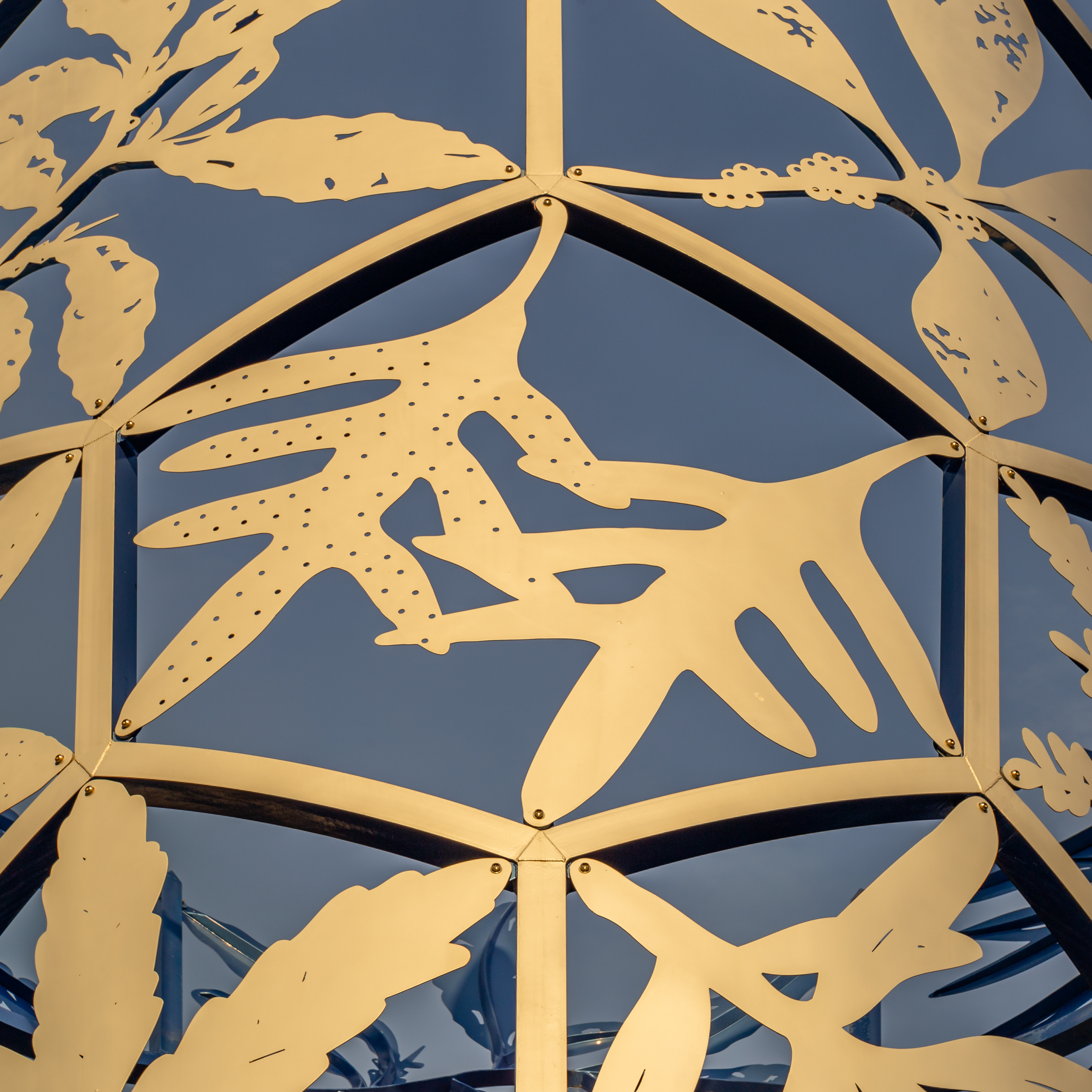
Close-up

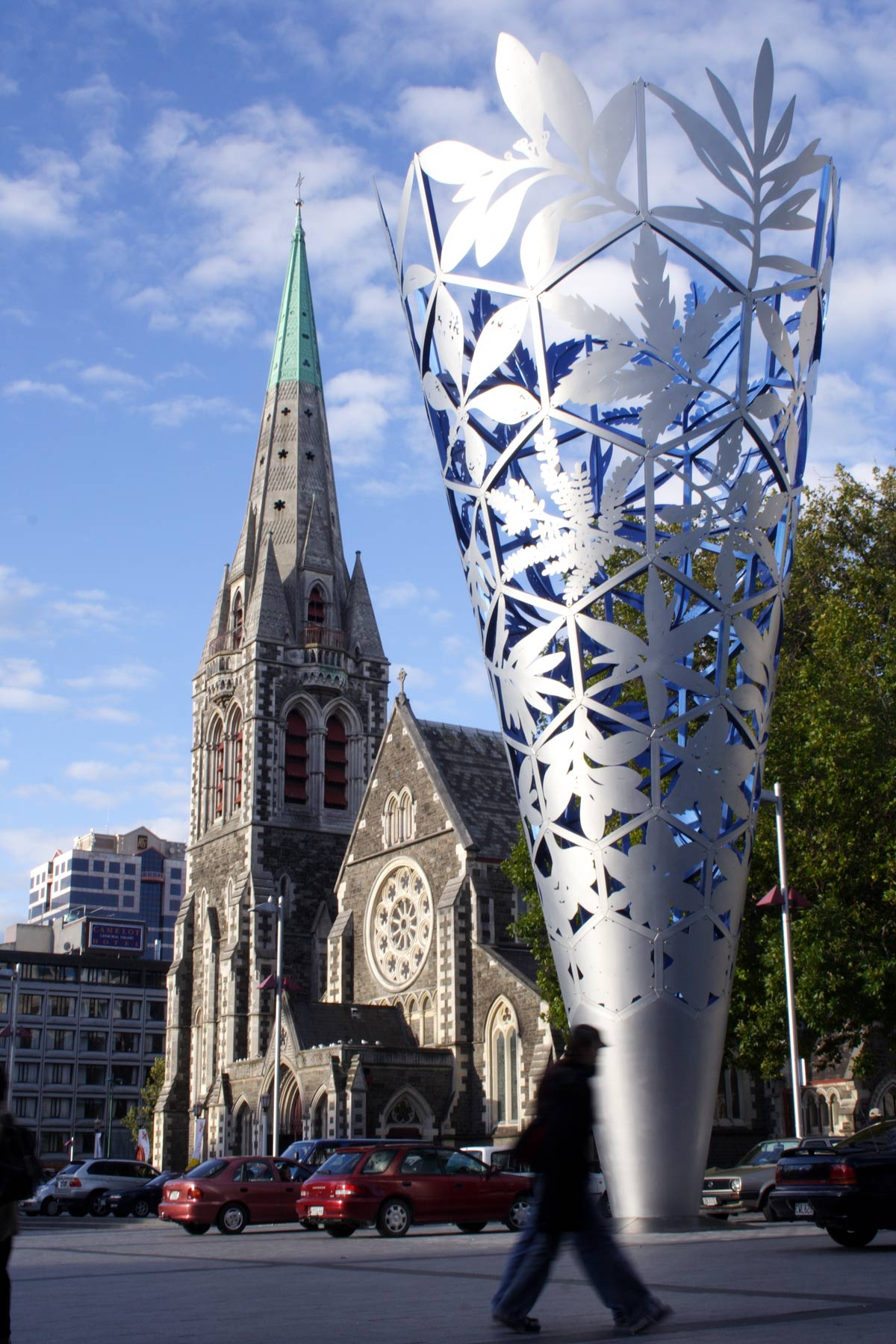
The sculpture beside Christ Church Cathedral, 2006

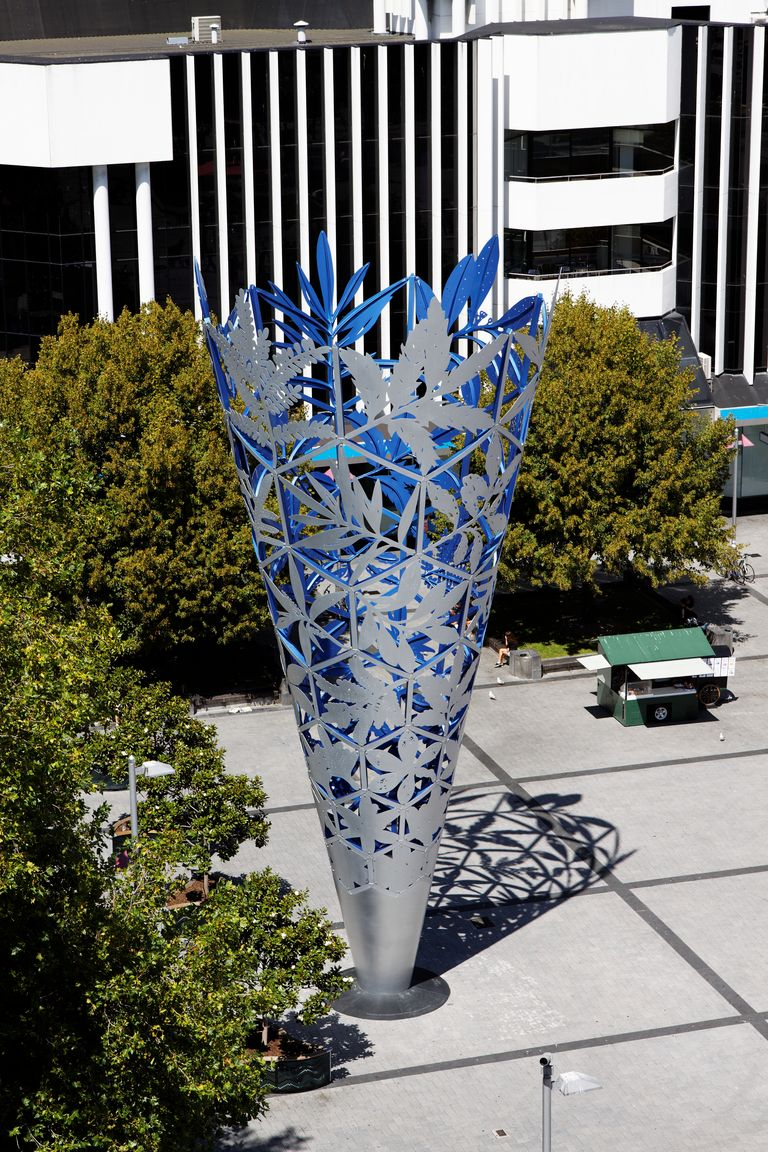
Above-ground view, 2010
