= Boyd Webb =

New Zealand visual artist (born 1947)

Boyd Webb (born 1947) is a New Zealand-born visual artist who works in the United Kingdom, mainly using the medium of photography although he has also produced sculpture and film. He was shortlisted for the Turner Prize in 1988. He has had solo shows at venues including the Hirshhorn Museum, Washington D.C., and Whitechapel Art Gallery, London.

== Life ==
He was born in New Zealand in 1947 and attended at the Ilam School of Art in Christchurch from 1968 to 1971 majoring in sculpture under Tom Taylor. He came to the UK and studied sculpture at the Royal College of Art, London from 1972 to 1975. He currently lives and works in Brighton, East Sussex, UK.

== Art ==
Initially he worked as a sculptor, making fibreglass forms. However he soon switched to photography, developing a practice based around constructing tableaux which he then photographs. His work has been cited as a major influence on the famous, long-running advertising campaigns by Silk Cut and Benson & Hedges.

Holly Arden described his art thus: "Many of them are shot in studio sets using man-made props to represent natural objects. Men, women and plastic animals adopt Monty Pythonesque poses against landscapes of plastic and carpet. The images have a literal quality, where Webb seems to go out of his way to show how they are constructed. Yet, they also pose bafflingly complex oppositions/connections between ideas of language and meaning, object and environment, scale and detail." Arden divides his art into three periods. The first, from the 1970s, is about "man's need to classify and analyse", and tends to combine text and image. In the 1980s he focused more on photographing installations, combining the large and the small in a harmonious relationship. Following that, in the 1990s, his works became more "scientific" and took greater effort to hide their construction, so it becomes hard to see how they are made.

Later he also moved into film, with Horse and Dog shown at the Estorick Collection in London in 2003. The film features a fox and a horse (a person in a fox costume and two people in a pantomime horse-style outfit) wandering English fields with suitcases and later pitching a tent. Adrian Searle found it obscure, lacking either in drama or pathos, comparing it unfavourably to the work of Matthew Barney, Paul McCarthy, and Peter Fischli & David Weiss.

== Exhibitions ==
Solo shows:

- Whitechapel Art Gallery, London 1978
- Whitechapel Art Gallery, 1987
- Directions, Hirshhorn Museum, Washington, D.C., 1990
- Boyd Webb, Brighton City Art Gallery and touring, 1994.
- Auckland Art Gallery and touring, 1997

Horse & Dog, Milton Keynes Gallery, 2002.

Other:

- At the Sydney Biennale in 1995, representing New Zealand

== Bibliography ==
- Louise Garrett, "The Contrary Vernacular of Boyd Webb", Art New Zealand, June 1998.
- Jenny Harper, "Unruly Truths", in Boyd Webb, exhibition catalogue, Auckland Art Gallery, 1997.
- S. Morgan, essay, in Boyd Webb, exhibition catalogue, London: Whitechapel Art Gallery, 1987.
