= Central Vikings Rugby Union =

Former NZ rugby union club, based in Hawke's Bay

(New Zealand) Central Vikings Rugby Union
- Founded: 1996; 30 years ago
- Disbanded: 1998; 28 years ago
- Region: Hawke's Bay; Manawatu
- Ground(s): McLean Park; Palmerston North Showgrounds
- Coach: Frank Oliver
- Captain: Bull Allen
- Most caps: Orcades Crawford; Tom Deighton (26)
- Top scorer: Jarrod Cunningham (382)
- Most tries: Roger Randle (16)
- League: NPC
- 1998: 1st

Central Vikings Rugby Union was a New Zealand rugby union team that played in the second division of the NPC for two seasons in 1997 and 1998. The team, formed from the merger of the Hawke's Bay and Manawatu unions, featured current and future All Blacks and a former All Black in coach Frank Oliver. It came second in its division in 1997, and first in 1998, and would have progressed to the first division. However, following financial trouble it split back into the two separate unions.

Reviving the Central Vikings as a Super Rugby team was floated in 2016, but this did not occur.

== History ==
The Central Vikings Rugby Union was founded in December 1996 with the merger of the Hawke's Bay and Manawatu unions. The Vikings were formed with the hopes of lifting themselves out of the 2nd division and to be competitive in the 1st division. The Central Vikings had two All Blacks in the team which included Bull Allen and Christian Cullen as well as featuring various Super 12 players such as Chiefs star Mark Ranby who later became an All Black himself. The Central Vikings finished 2nd in 1997 when they were beaten 63–10 by Northland but even if they had won, they weren't allowed to progress into the 1st division. They finished 1st in 1998 when they beat Bay of Plenty. They were subsequently allowed to progress to the 1st division. The Vikings however got into financial trouble and they split back to Hawke's Bay and Manawatu for the 1999 season.

The Vikings were largely hindered in their second season after not only losing All Black legend Christian Cullen but also losing the then All Blacks Coach John Hart after Hart was advised he could not coach NPC, Super Rugby and All Black teams at the same time. Despite these disadvantages the Vikings went on to win the second division and were picked to be a major force in the first division before financial problems prevented them from advancing and ultimately caused the end of the Vikings.

With the announcement that New Zealand might receive a 6th Super Franchise in the SANZAR Super Rugby competition beginning 2016, the Hawke's Bay union announced its interest in forming this franchise together with Manawatu, effectively resurrecting the Central Vikings brand as a Super Rugby franchise. This never came to fruition and instead Super Rugby added the South African Southern Kings, the Argentinian Jaguares and the Japanese Sunwolves.

== Controversy ==
In December 1997 a special meeting of the Hawke's Bay Rugby Football Union was held to decide the future of the Central Vikings Rugby Union. Eight of the Hawke's Bay Union's 21 clubs called the meeting to seek agreement for Hawke's Bay to withdraw from the Vikings. A vote on a resolution calling for Hawke's Bay to withdraw from the combined Hawke's Bay–Manawatu team was lost, 7–12, in a secret ballot. Once the resolution was lost, HBRFU president Tom Mulligan said there was no reason for the meeting to continue. The Vikings were then given the all-clear to continue as an NPC second division rugby team.

== Fixtures and results ==
=== 1997 Season ===
The Central Vikings played their first match against Fiji in Palmerston North on June 2, 1997.

Date	Comp	Home team	Score	Away team	Score	
02-05-97	PS	Central Vikings	10	Fiji	19	
06-08-97	PS	Central Vikings	38	Wellington	21	
23-08-97	NPC	Central Vikings	72	Thames Valley	0	
30-08-97	NPC	Wanganui	6	Central Vikings	42	
06-09-97	NPC	King Country	35	Central Vikings	41	
13-09-97	NPC	Central Vikings	90	Nelson Bays	21	
20-09-97	NPC	South Canterbury	7	Central Vikings	87	
26-09-97	NPC	Northland	42	Central Vikings	13	
03-10-97	NPC	Central Vikings	10	Bay of Plenty	31	
11-10-97	NPC	Central Vikings	95	Wairarapa Bush	12	
19-10-97	NPC	Bay of Plenty	6	Central Vikings	29	Semi final
25-10-97	NPC	Northland	63	Central Vikings	10	Final

- Note - PS = Pre Season, NPC = National Provincial Championship
- Overall Season standing: 2nd

=== 1998 Season ===
Former Manawatu rugby captain and All Black trialist Andrew McMaster returned from Ireland, where he had four years coaching the Monkstown club, to join the Central Vikings as the new Vikings assistant coach. The Central Vikings had a non-championship match against Southland on 1 August 1998. Southland only just managed to hold on to the game, although they scored five tries to the Vikings two. Southland 31 (P Taylor 2, P Alatini, B Leckner, P Miller tries; A Kimura 3 cons)

Central Vikings 29 (A Powdrell, D Bellamy tries; J Cunningham 2 cons, 5 pens). Halftime 19-13 to Southland.

Date	Comp	Home team	Score	Away team	Score	
01-07-98	PS	Central Vikings	30	New Zealand Marist XV	29	
01-08-98	PS	Central Vikings	29	Southland	31	
22-08-98	NPC	Central Vikings	79	Wairarapa Bush	12	
29-08-98	NPC	Central Vikings	43	Marlborough	11	
05-09-98	NPC	Thames Valley	5	Central Vikings	52	
12-09-98	NPC	Nelson Bays	18	Central Vikings	34	
19-09-98	NPC	Central Vikings	25	Wanganui	12	
26-09-98	NPC	Wairarapa Bush	3	Central Vikings	55	
03-10-98	NPC	Bay of Plenty	19	Central Vikings	37	
10-10-98	NPC	Central Vikings	29	King Country	8	
17-10-98	NPC	Central Vikings	23	King Country	20	Semi final
24-11-98	NPC	Central Vikings	33	Bay of Plenty	18	Final

- Note - PS = Pre Season, NPC = National Provincial Championship
- Overall Season standing: 1st

== Players ==
- Mark "Bull" Allen, University PN
- Mark Atkinson, Havelock North
- Stephen Bachop, Te Kawau
- Damon Bellamy, Taradale
- Charles Beetham, Dannevirke & Hastings Sports
- Aaron Britten, Havelock North
- Hugh Brown, Taradale
- Alphonse Carroll, Te Kawau
- Michael Chaffey, Taradale
- Roger Chappell, Napier Tech Old Boys
- Bradley Clarke, Havelock North
- Orcades Crawford, Colenso-Pirates
- Christian Cullen, Kia Toa
- Jarrod Cunningham, Havelock North
- Chresten Davis, University PN
- Tom Deighton, Dannevirke
- Steve Fee, Napier Old-Boys Marist
- William Furnell, Marist PN
- Simon Gibbs, University PN
- Greg Halford, Havelock North
- Simon Halford, Oroua
- Andrew Harris, Te Kawa
- Tim Kareko, Linton Army
- Jeff Karika, Hastings Sports
- Glenn Kenworthy, Taradale
- Lister Kire, Clive
- Potu Leavasa, Taradale
- Danny Lee, Havelock North
- Horace Lewis, Hastings Sports
- Tony Maidens, Havelock North
- Andrew Natusch, Havelock North
- Mutu Ngarimu, Taradale
- Brent Oliver, Harlequins (Wellington)
- Murdoch Paewai, Havelock North
- Mark Ranby, Harlequins (Wellington)
- Roger Randle, Hastings Sports
- Reece Robinson, Napier Old-Boys Marist
- Deryck Rowse, Marist PN
- Trevor Savou, Queen Elizabeth College Old Boys
- Paul Schmidt-Uili, Marist PN
- Anthony Stephenson, Feilding
- Scott Taylor, Napier Old Boys Marist
- Scott Waldergrave, High School Old Boys PN
- Dion Waller, Marist PN
- Dustin Watts, Napier Tech Old Boys
- Karl Williams, Marist PN
- Andrew Willock, Wellington
  - Julian White was set to play in 1997 but was ruled out with a broken leg

== Coaches ==
- Frank Oliver was the coach of the Central Vikings in the two seasons they played in the second division of the NPC 1997–98.
- Andrew McMaster, a former Manawatu rugby captain, Canterbury representative and All Black trialist, joined the Central Vikings as the Assistant coach after four years of coaching the Monkstown club in Ireland.
- Mark Shaw, a former All Black and Manawatu flanker, was set to replace Frank Oliver as the head coach of the Central Vikings for the 1999 season, however the Vikings were disbanded so Shaw did not coach them through the season.

== Sponsors ==
- Lowe Walker (originally signed a three-year contract, however they left the Vikings during 1998)
- Lion Red
