= Orcades Crawford =

NZ rugby union player

- Born: 23 August 1965 (age 61)
- Height: 185 cm (6 ft 1 in)
- Weight: 111 kg (245 lb)
- School: Te Aute College

Rugby union career
- Position: Prop
Provincial / State sides
Years	Team	Apps	(Points)
1988–89	Hawke's Bay	19	(12)
1990–91	Manawatu	11	(4)
1992–00	Hawke's Bay	92	(40)
1997–98	Central Vikings	26	(20)
2000–03	East Coast	36	(25)
Super Rugby
Years	Team	Apps	(Points)
1997	Blues	6	(0)
1998	Hurricanes	6	(0)

Orcades Crawford (born 23 August 1965) is a New Zealand former professional rugby union player.

Crawford was a NZ under-16s and NZ Secondary Schools representative while a pupil at Te Aute College.

A prop, Crawford gained a NZ Colts call up in 1986 and two years later debuted for Hawke's Bay, where he would play 111 games. He also played provincial rugby with Manawatu and the Central Vikings during the 1990s, while making the occasional Super 12 appearance with the Blues and Hurricanes. Further representative honours came in 1994 when he toured South Africa with New Zealand Maori. He finished his career playing for East Coast and was a member of their side that reached the 2001 NPC 2nd Division final, before retiring in 2003 having featured against all 27 provincial unions.
