= Dion Waller =

NZ international rugby union player

- Born: Dion Alan George Waller; 6 January 1974 (age 52) Tūrangi, New Zealand
- Height: 1.98 m (6 ft 6 in)
- Weight: 108 kg (238 lb)
- School: Tauhara College
- Occupation: Retired Professional Rugby Player

Rugby union career
- Position: Lock
Provincial / State sides
| Years | Team | Apps | (Points) |
| 1995-1996 | King Country | 21 | |
| 1997-1998 | Central Vikings | 25 | |
| 1999-2002 | Wellington | 43 | |
Super Rugby
| Years | Team | Apps | (Points) |
| 1996-2002 | Hurricanes | 65 | |
International career
| Years | Team | Apps | (Points) |
| 2001 | New Zealand | 1 | (0) |

Dion Alan George Waller (born 6 January 1974 in Tūrangi) is a former New Zealand rugby union footballer. He played for the Wellington Lions, Hurricanes, New Zealand Maori and All Blacks. He was one of the leading locks in New Zealand rugby at provincial level with great lineout attributes, but never got a real opportunity to play internationally as he left New Zealand to play in Japan.

He made his debut for King Country in 1995 after being selected for the New Zealand U21s tour to Argentina. He debuted for the New Zealand Maori in 1996 and went on to collect 14 caps from then and also represented New Zealand A Team in 2000 till his departure of New Zealand in 2002. Waller played for the now defunct Central Vikings 25 times and winning the Division Two NPC Final against Bay of Plenty in 1998, following their collapse moved to Wellington, between 1999 and 2002 he played 43 matches. In 2000 he played a major role in Wellington's win in the final against Canterbury.

He played 4 years in Japan for Toyota Shokki and then went on to finish his career in Italy playing 2 years for Viadana.

Dion retired in 2008 and went straight into giving back to rugby in New Zealand by coaching Aotea College U15s in Porirua. He then went on to be the Rugby Coaching Director at Tawa Rugby Club from 2012 to 2014. In 2013 he coached the Tawa Premier side to its first Jubilee Cup Championship, also winning the Swindale Shield, Andy Leslie trophy, and all inter club trophies available. 2014 he coached Tawa to the semi-finals of the Jubilee Cup.

Dion spent time in Japan coaching at the Honda Rugby Club in Japan. Now Dion is in his second year as Head Coach of the Wellington U19's and works in the Wellington Rugby High Performance Unit.
