= Chresten Davis =

NZ international rugby union player

- Born: Chresten Scott Davis; 16 September 1975 (age 51) Hamilton, New Zealand
- Height: 2.01 m (6 ft 7 in)
- Weight: 105 kg (231 lb)
- School: Morrinsville College
- University: Massey University
- Occupation: Assistant Principal

Rugby union career
- Position: Loose forward
Senior career
Years	Team	Apps	(Points)
2004–05	Kintetsu Liners		
2005–08	Petrarca Rugby		
Provincial / State sides
Years	Team	Apps	(Points)
1994–96	Manawatu		
1998	Central Vikings		
1999–2004	Waikato		
Super Rugby
Years	Team	Apps	(Points)
1996–98	Hurricanes	20	(10)
1999–2004	Chiefs		
2005	Blues	1	
International career
Years	Team	Apps	(Points)
1994–96	New Zealand Colts		
1996	New Zealand	0	(0)

Chresten Scott Davis (born 16 September 1975) is a former New Zealand rugby union player. A loose forward, Clark represented Manawatu, the Central Vikings and Waikato at a provincial level, and the Hurricanes, Chiefs and Blues in Super Rugby. He was a member of the New Zealand national side, the All Blacks, on the 1996 tour of South Africa, playing two matches but no internationals.
