= Potu Leavasa Jr. =

- Full name: Potu Leavasa Jr.
- Born: 10 January 1996 (age 30) Motoʻotua, Samoa
- Height: 1.96 m (6 ft 5 in)
- Weight: 120 kg (18 st 13 lb; 265 lb)
- Notable relative: Potu Leavasa (father)

Rugby union career
- Position: Lock/Flanker
- Current team: Palmyra Rugby Club
Youth career
- Auckland
- Hamilton Marist
- 2015: Melbourne Rebels
Senior career
| Years | Team | Apps | (Points) |
- Southend Saxons
| 2018−2019 | Warringah | 16 | (15) |
| 2020 | Austin Gilgronis | 6 | (0) |
| 2020 | Counties Manukau | 8 | (5) |
| 2021−2022 | Zebre | 21 | (0) |
| 2022 | Manawatu Turbos | 10 | (5) |
- Correct as of 1 Apr 2022
International career
| Years | Team | Apps | (Points) |
| 2018−2019 | Samoa A | 6 | (0) |
- Correct as of 15 Jan 2021

Potu Leavasa Jr. (Motoʻotua, 10 October 1996) is a Samoan rugby union player. His usual position is as a Flanker or Lock and he currently plays for Manawatu Turbos in NPC.

In 2020 Mitre 10 Cup season, he played for Counties Manukau. He played for Italian team for Zebre from 2021 to 2022.

In 2018 Leavasa was named in the Samoa A squad.
