= Stu Loe =

- Full name: Stuart Jonathan Loe
- Born: 19 February 1966 (age 60)
- Notable relative: Richard Loe (cousin)

Rugby union career
- Position: Prop
Provincial / State sides
Years	Team	Apps	(Points)
1990–98	Canterbury	122	(53)
1999	West Coast	10	(0)
Super Rugby
Years	Team	Apps	(Points)
1996–98	Crusaders	26	(0)
1999	Hurricanes	9	(0)

Stuart Jonathan Loe (born 19 February 1966) is a New Zealand former professional rugby union player.

A Scargill farmer, Loe was a NZ Colts representative and got capped 122 times by Canterbury during the 1990s, setting a record for a Canterbury prop. He finished up in provincial rugby with a season out on loan at West Coast in 1999. A foundation player with the Crusaders, Loe made 26 appearances for the Super 12 team and was a member of the side that beat the Blues in the 1998 Super 12 final. He played with the Hurricanes in the 1999 Super 12 season.

Loe is a first cousin of All Blacks prop Richard Loe.
