= Darryl Fale =

- Full name: Darryl Glen Fale
- Born: 28 May 1971 (age 55)
- Height: 192 cm (6 ft 4 in)
- Weight: 105 kg (231 lb)

Rugby union career
- Position: Loose forward
Provincial / State sides
| Years | Team | Apps | (Points) |
| 1997–00 | Taranaki | 46 | (15) |
| 2001–02 | Manawatu | 15 | (0) |
| 2003 | Wairarapa Bush | 6 | (5) |
Super Rugby
| Years | Team | Apps | (Points) |
| 1999 | Hurricanes | 2 | (0) |

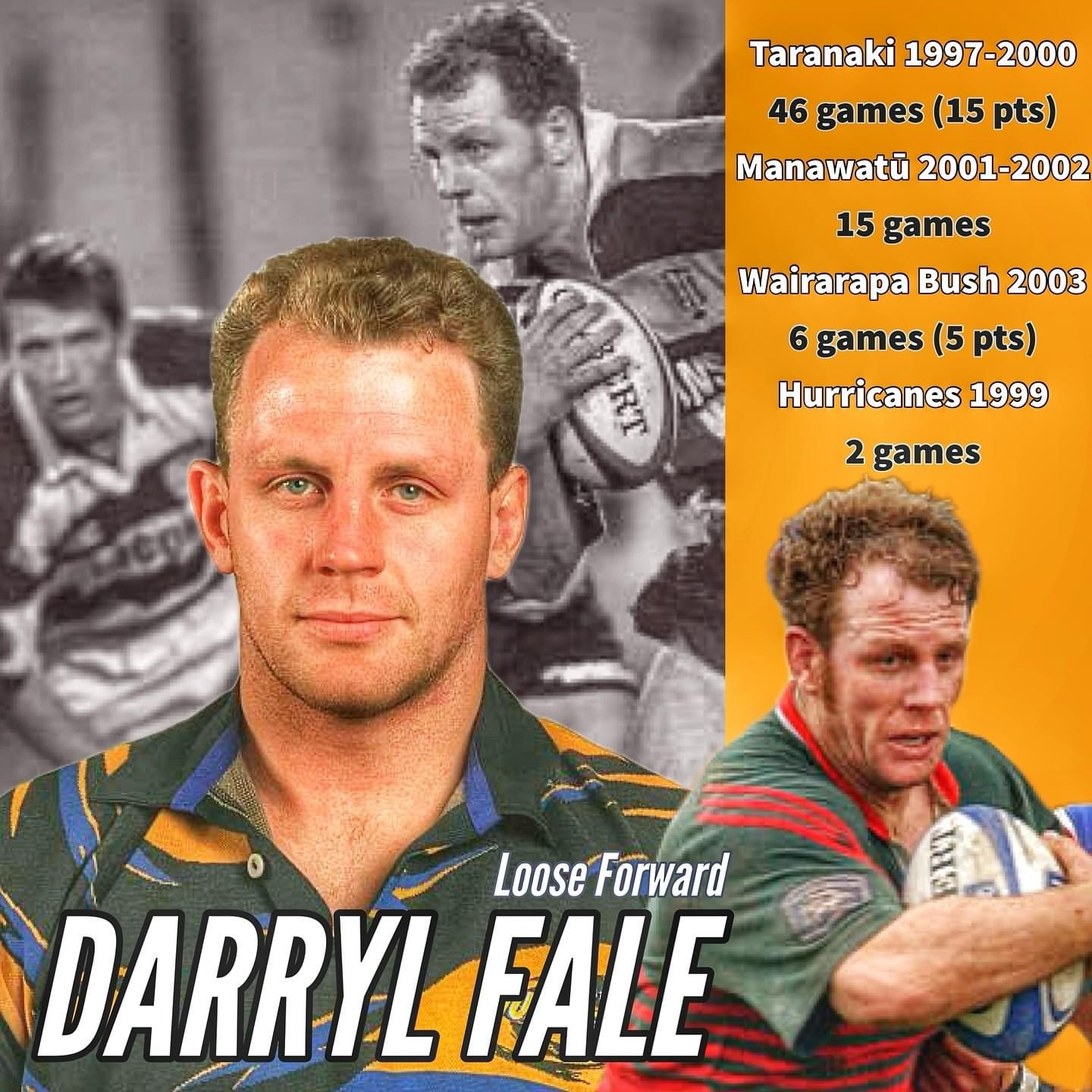
Playing Stats

Darryl Glen Fale (born 28 May 1971) is a New Zealand former professional rugby union player.

== Biography ==
A loose forward, Fale played some rugby in England early in his career and captained Bedford Queens to victory in the 1995 Pilkington Shield final against St Albans. He competed for Taranaki, Manawatu and Wairarapa Bush in New Zealand provincial rugby. In 1999, Fale made two Super 12 appearances for the Hurricanes, including a match as the starting No. 8 against the Sharks in East London, with Filo Tiatia out injured.

Fale became a referee after retiring and works in the insurance industry.
