= Danny Lee (rugby union) =

NZ international rugby union player

- Born: Daniel David Lee; 1 March 1976 (age 50) Hastings, New Zealand
- Height: 1.75 m (5 ft 9 in)
- Weight: 80 kg (180 lb)
- School: Hastings Boys' High School

Rugby union career
- Position: Halfback
Senior career
Years	Team	Apps	(Points)
2009–2011	Newport GD	12	(5)
Provincial / State sides
Years	Team	Apps	(Points)
1994–1996	Hawke's Bay		
1997–1998	Central Vikings		
1999–2001	Counties Manukau		
2002–2005	Otago		
2006–2008	Hawke's Bay		
Super Rugby
Years	Team	Apps	(Points)
1997	Hurricanes	1	(0)
1999–2002	Chiefs	31	(30)
2003–2005	Highlanders	17	(10)
2008	Blues	12	(10)
International career
Years	Team	Apps	(Points)
2002	New Zealand	2	(5)

Daniel David Lee (born 1 March 1976) is a New Zealand former professional rugby union player who is the head coach of the NOLA Gold of Major League Rugby (MLR).

Lee played for the Hurricanes, Chiefs, the Highlanders Super 14 and Hawke's Bay in the Air New Zealand Cup. In 2007 he joined the Blues in New Zealand. In June 2009, Lee joined the Newport Gwent Dragons in Wales on a two-year contract. In November 2010, after a series of injuries, Lee announced his retirement from rugby having made just 12 appearances for Newport Gwent Dragons.

Lee played two test matches for the All Blacks in 2002:

- the 28-31 loss to England at Twickenham Stadium. He was an injury replacement for Steve Devine after 24 minutes and scored a try.
- the 20-20 draw with France at Paris, in which he started.

His international career was limited due to the presence of Justin Marshall, Byron Kelleher, Devine, Piri Weepu and Jimmy Cowan.

== Coaching career ==
After retiring from professional rugby, Lee became a rugby coach. He coached Hawke's Bay from 2011 to 2017, and then Mie Honda Heat until 2021. As of 2025, Lee coaches the NOLA Gold rugby team of Major League Rugby (MLR).
