= Mike Russell (rugby union) =

New Zealand rugby player (born 1967)

- Full name: Michael Gordon Russell
- Born: 29 November 1967 (age 58)
- Height: 203 cm (6 ft 8 in)
- Weight: 105 kg (231 lb)

Rugby union career
- Position: Lock
Provincial / State sides
Years	Team	Apps	(Points)
1989–93	Waikato	36	(16)
1994–97	Wellington	48	(5)
Super Rugby
Years	Team	Apps	(Points)
1996–97	Hurricanes	18	(0)

Michael Gordon Russell (born 29 November 1967) is a New Zealand former professional rugby union player.

Russell attended Whangārei Boys' High School and pursued tertiary studies in Hamilton, during which time he competed for Waikato. He was a member of Waikato's 1992 NPC title-winning team. While with Waikato, Russell made All Black trials in 1992 and 1993. He competed in the top division of French rugby in 1992-93 and 1993–94 with Avenir Valencien.

Moving to Wellington in 1994, Russell made the Hurricanes' Super 12 foundation squad two years later and was one of five to play all 11 games in the inaugural season. He remained with the Hurricanes for two more seasons, though he didn't feature in 1998 due to injury. Before retiring, Russell had another stint at Avenir Valencien in 1999.

Russell, a builder by profession, set up the Hurricanes alumni network for past players.
