= Neil Dawson =

New Zealand sculptor

Neil Dawson CNZM
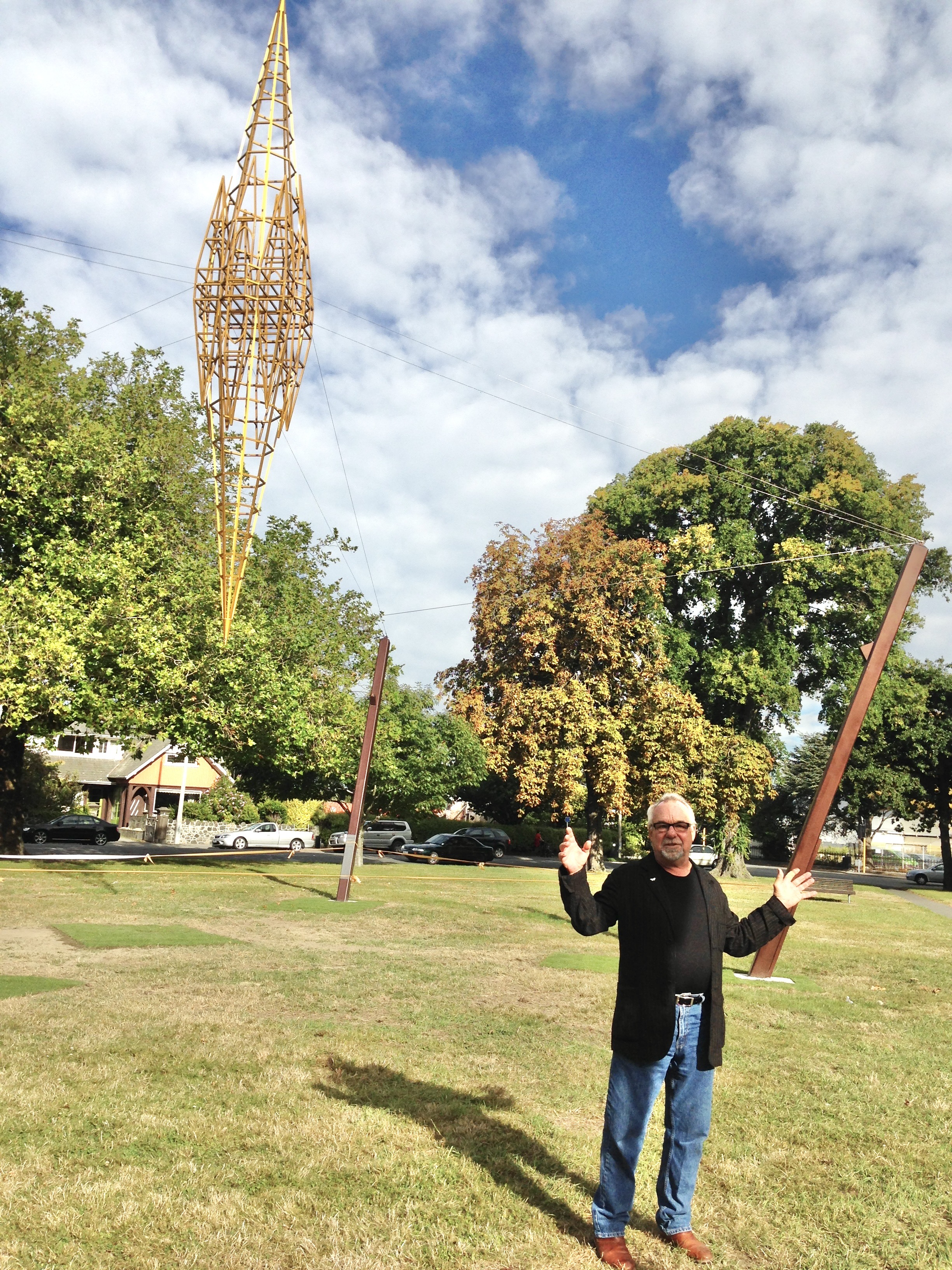
- Neil Dawson 2014
- Born: Francis Neil Dawson; 6 November 1948 (age 77); Christchurch, New Zealand
- Education: Diploma of Fine Arts (Hons), University of Canterbury; Graduate Diploma in Sculpture, Victorian College of the Arts
- Occupation: Sculptor
- Awards: Arts Foundation Laureate Award (2003)

Francis Neil Dawson CNZM (born 6 November 1948) is a New Zealand artist best known for his large-scale civic sculptures.

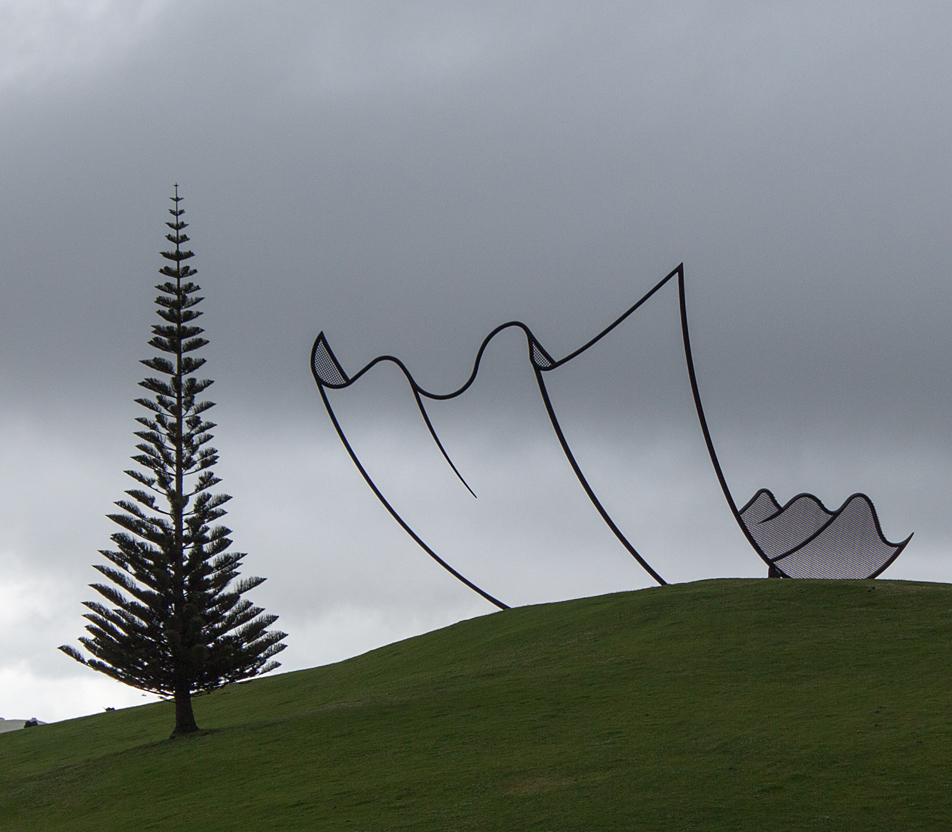
Horizons at Gibbs Farm

The Chalice, Cathedral Square, Christchurch

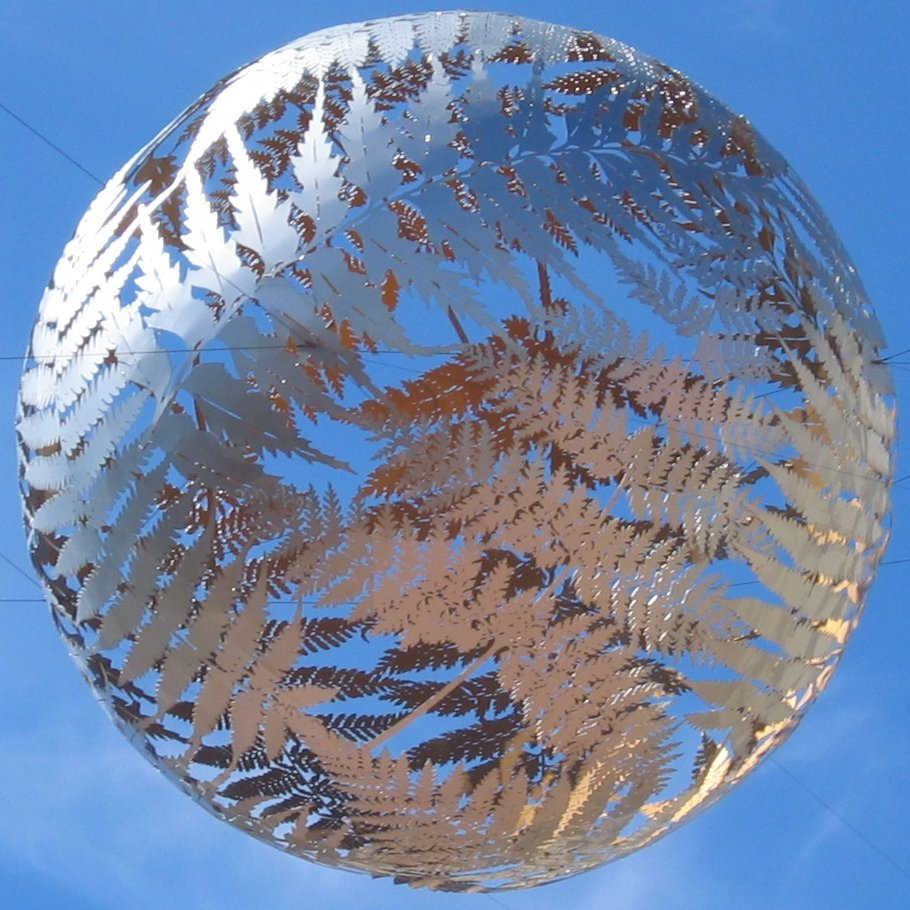
Neil Dawson's Ferns hangs above Wellington's Civic Square

== Early life ==
Dawson was born in Christchurch in 1948. The son of Methodist minister John Brent Dawson and Florence Emily (née Carlisle), he grew up in Masterton, Petone, and Hastings, and received his secondary education at Hastings Boys' High School where he was taught by Russ Williams.

While in the fourth form, Dawson climbed onto the assembly hall roof and painted April Fool in large white letters. This won him front page exposure in the Hawke's Bay Herald-Tribune and he regards this escapade as the "beginning of [his] career in public art."

Dawson attended the University of Canterbury (1966–1969) where he studied under Tom Taylor and Eric Doudney. He gained a Diploma of Fine Arts (Hons) and then spent a year at teachers' college. This was followed, with the help of a Queen Elizabeth II Arts Council grant, by a Graduate Diploma in Sculpture from the Victorian College of the Arts, Melbourne, in 1973. On his return, Dawson drove a truck for four years and in 1975 began teaching drawing and design at Christchurch Polytechnic. He resigned from the Polytechnic in 1984 to work as a full-time sculptor out of the former Oddfellows' Hall in Linwood.

== Exhibitions ==
Dawson's smaller works often use illusion and such optical patterns as moiré to achieve their effects. Many of these works are wall-hangings, although stand-alone pieces using such everyday patterned items as playing cards and willow pattern crockery are also among Dawson's themes.

Dr Michael Dunn, Emeritus Professor at the University of Auckland and a former head of Elam School of Fine Arts, describes Dawson in his book New Zealand Sculpture: A History as follows:

Dawson's sculpture is individual, unique and easy to recognise. In fact his sculptures flout convention in their lightness of feel, their transparency and their escape from the conventions of earthbound pedestal-based display.

Dawson has shown regularly with dealer galleries and public art museums since graduating from art school. Although he had already participated in a number of group exhibitions, his first solo dealer gallery show was House Alterations at the Brooke Gifford Gallery in Christchurch in 1978. The following year the Robert McDougall Art Gallery gave Dawson his first major public museum exhibition which he titled Seascape . Since then Dawson has held solo exhibitions regularly throughout New Zealand and in Australia. In 1989 The National Art Gallery in Wellington (now Te Papa Tongarewa) presented a survey exhibition of Dawson's work Neil Dawson Site Works 1981–1989.

== Public sculpture ==
Dawson is primarily known for his large scale civic sculpture. A selection of these is detailed below:

1981 Dawson's first public outdoor sculpture was installed at the Christchurch Arts Centre. Titled Echo, it was constructed out of fibre glass tubing and suspended above the quadrangle. Although it seemed an abstract composition from most angles, when seen from one particular point it formed the outlines of a simple house. Dawson described the installation as 'a three-dimensional life-sized drawing'. The work was removed after the Christchurch earthquake in 2010 and reinstalled in 2021.

1984 Dawson was commissioned by the Bank of New Zealand for a large sculpture outside its Wellington head office. The 5 metre by 4 metre sculpture titled The Rock was suspended 4 metres in the air in front of the building on its Willis street frontage. The rock-shaped 'drawing' was computer-generated and based on a rock found by Dawson in McCormack's Bay a few kilometres from his studio. The BNZ moved its head office to Auckland in 1998, and some time after that The Rock was moved to its current site on the Willeston Street side of the building.

1989 Dawson was invited to participate in the exhibition Magiciens de la Terre at the Pompidou Centre in Paris. The curator Jean-Hubert Martin intended the exhibition to offer a 'correcting perspective' on Euro-centric programming. Globe was an 85kg metallic sphere depicting the earth from space. It was suspended 25 metres above the courtyard outside the Pompidou which created considerable logistical problems.

1992 Throwback was installed in Albert Park behind the Auckland Art Gallery as a commission by the gallery to commemorate its centenary in 1988.

1994 Horizons was commissioned by Alan Gibbs as one of the first large-scale sculptural works that make up Gibbs Farm, the largest sculpture park in the Southern hemisphere.

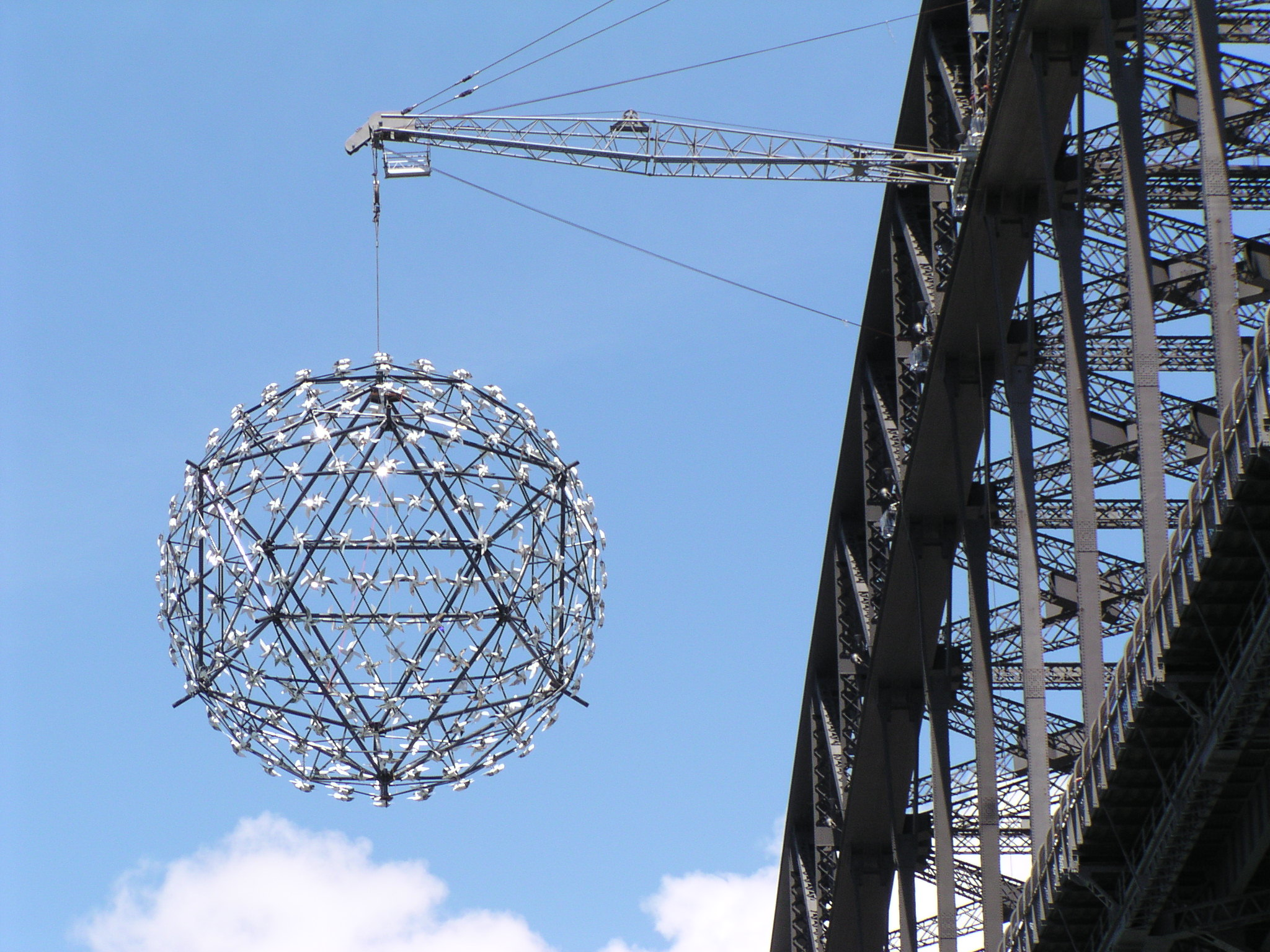
Fanfare suspended off the Sydney Harbour Bridge

1998 Ferns was commissioned by the Wellington Sculpture Trust. Dawson cut 11 fern shapes and formed them into a sphere 3.4 metres in diameter and suspended it above Wellington's Civic Square. The work was taken down in 2015 and a new stainless steel version installed three years later. Ferns is often used as a visual symbol for Wellington and is recognised as a city icon.

2001 The Chalice was commissioned to mark the 150th anniversary of Canterbury's foundation. This 18 metre high inverted cone was sited near the Christchurch Cathedral to reflect the spire. The surface of Chalice was cut to reveal shapes of plants indigenous to the area. Although the Cathedral suffered extensive damage from the 2011 Christchurch earthquake Chalice itself remained standing. Dawson told reporters he hoped the survival of the sculpture would be seen as 'a symbol of the recovery rather than the quake itself'.

2005–2015 Dawson's sculpture Fanfare was first suspended from the Sydney Harbour Bridge to welcome the 2005 year. The sculpture is made up of 350 reflective pinwheels arranged in a sphere. In 2007 Sydney's Lord Mayor, Clover Moore, presented the sculpture to the Christchurch City Council as a gift. After a long time in storage, it was eventually decided to install Fanfare next to State Highway 1, just south of the Waimakariri River Bridge to welcome visitors coming to the city from the north. Fanfare was officially unveiled on 10 June 2015 by mayor Lianne Dalziel and Dawson. Dalziel, with reference to Fanfare's first installation in Sydney and to the destructive Christchurch earthquakes, said at the ceremony: 'today feels like it's come home and it's really going to be a big statement about what our city is and what it's going to become'. Dawson himself was more humble and described his artwork as "basically just a ball with some propellers on it".

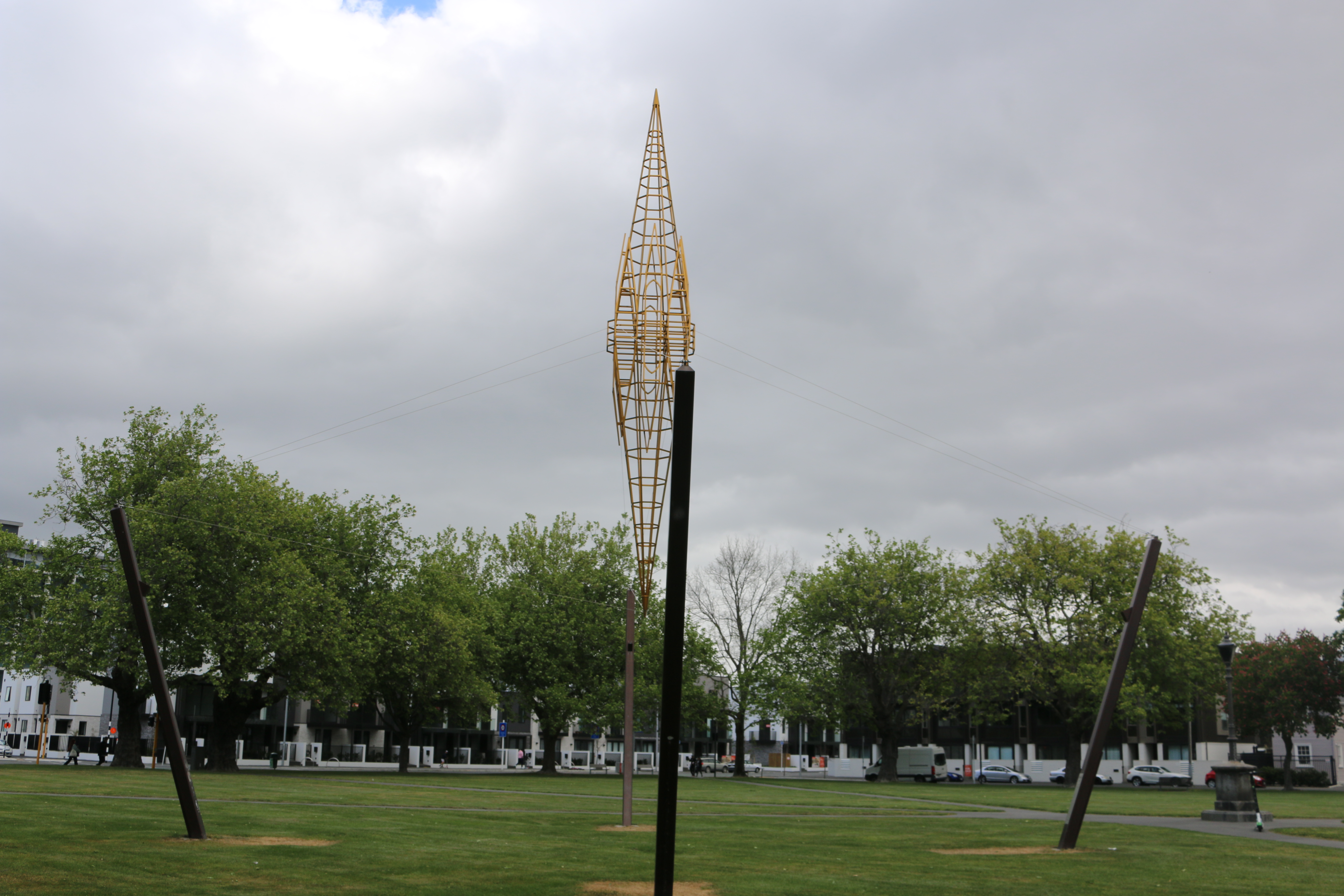
Spires is located in Christchurch's Latimer Square

2014, Dawson's Spires was installed in Christchurch's Latimer Square. The work was inspired by Dawson's attempts to draw from memory the demolished spire of Christchurch Cathedral. It was initially planned that the sculpture would hover over the centre of Latimer Square, along the axis of Worcester Street, so make a visual connection with Christchurch Cathedral. Its current placement, however, is in the southern half of Latimer Square, not far from the Cardboard Cathedral. A structural engineer had approached Dawson in 2012 to enquire whether he wanted to design another sculpture for Christchurch, and when he agreed, she donated her time to undertake the structural design for the installation.

2017 Dawson's sculpture Ascension can be seen suspended in the middle of Masterton's northern roundabout.

== Selected works ==
- Elongation from the series House Alterations 1978 view
- Interior 1979 view
- Seascape 1979 view
- Rock Construction 1984 view
- Tumble 1985 view
- Double Take 1987 view
- Throwback 1992 view
- Cones 2000 view
- Solardome 2004 view

== Honours and awards ==
In 1990, Dawson was awarded the New Zealand 1990 Commemoration Medal. He received the Arts Foundation of New Zealand Arts Laureate Award in 2003, and in the 2004 New Year Honours he was appointed a Companion of the New Zealand Order of Merit, for services to sculpture.
