= Jason Hooper (rugby union) =

- Full name: Jason Lewis Hooper
- Born: 10 December 1973 (age 52)
- Height: 182 cm (6 ft 0 in)
- Weight: 117 kg (258 lb)

Rugby union career
- Position: Prop
Provincial / State sides
Years	Team	Apps	(Points)
1998–99	Wanganui	13	(0)
1999–03	Taranaki	33	(0)
Super Rugby
Years	Team	Apps	(Points)
2002–03	Hurricanes	7	(0)

Jason Lewis Hooper (born 10 December 1973) is a New Zealand former professional rugby union player.

A prop, Hooper played much of his club rugby at Borders and began in first-class rugby at Wanganui in 1998. He moved on to Taranaki in 1999 and gained a place in the Hurricanes squad for the 2002 Super 12 season. After featuring seven times for the Hurricanes in two seasons, Hooper continued his career in France, where he competed with FC Auch and RC Narbonne. He won a Taranaki championship title with Southern at the age of 39 in 2013.

Hooper was worked as a panel beater outside of rugby.
