= Potu Leavasa =

Samoa international rugby union player

- Born: Mailo Potumoe Leavasa; 27 November 1971 (age 54) Apia, Samoa
- Height: 6 ft 5 in (1.96 m)
- Weight: 242 lb (110 kg)

Rugby union career
- Position: Lock
Amateur team(s)
Years	Team	Apps	(Points)
1993-1997	Taradale		
Senior career
Years	Team	Apps	(Points)
1993-1999	Taradale		
Provincial / State sides
Years	Team	Apps	(Points)
1993–1999	Hawke's Bay	5	(0)
1997	Central Vikings	34	(0)
1998	Northland	3	(0)
Super Rugby
Years	Team	Apps	(Points)
1997	Wellington Hurricanes	1	(0)
International career
Years	Team	Apps	(Points)
1993–2002	Samoa	17	(0)

Potumoe Leavasa, better known as Potu Leavasa, (born 27 November 1971 in Apia) is a Samoan former rugby union player who played as a lock and coach.

== Career ==
He was selected for the Hurricanes in 1997 on the strength of a strong 1996 NPC season with Hawke's Bay and an impressive tour to Britain with Western Samoa that followed.

His only appearance in the Super 12 competition was when he came as a flanker against the Crusaders in the second round.

Leavasa played for the Central Vikings five times in 1997, previously capped 29 times for Hawke's Bay.

His first cap for Samoa was during a match against Tonga, at Nuku'alofa, on 29 May 1993. He was part of the 1995 Rugby World Cup roster, playing three matches. Leavasa took also part to the 1996 Samoa tour to Britain. His last international cap was during a match against South Africa, at Pretoria, on 6 July 2002.

=== Coaching career ===
Since 2016 he has been working in the coaching staff of the second national team of Samoa, preparing it for matches in the framework of the Americas Pacific Challenge. He holds the post of backs coach under Brian Lima as head of the coaching staff.

== Personal life ==
He is father of Potu Leavasa Jr. (born 1996), also a rugby player, who plays as lock for Samoa A national team. He was formed at the Melbourne Rebels Academy and was recruited by the Warringah Rats.

In 1997, Leavasa Sr. was a suspect in the case of the rape of a woman by one of the Hurricanes players in Durban.
