= 1992 National Provincial Championship =

New Zealand rugby union tournament in 1992

The 1992 season was the fourteenth year of the National Provincial Championship (NPC), a provincial rugby union competition in New Zealand. Waikato were the winners of Division 1.

== Division 1 ==
=== Standings ===
The following table gives the final standings:

Qualified for semi-finals
Relegated to Division Two

Pos	Team	Pld	W	D	L	PF	PA	PD	Pts
1	Auckland	8	7	0	1	253	127	+126	28
2	Otago	8	6	0	2	203	147	+56	25
3	North Harbour	8	6	0	2	222	157	+65	24
4	Waikato	8	5	0	3	268	153	+115	20
5	Wellington	8	4	0	4	183	182	+1	18
6	King Country	8	3	0	5	144	245	-101	12
7	Canterbury	8	2	0	6	197	198	-1	10
8	Hawke's Bay	8	2	0	6	131	267	-136	8
9	North Auckland	8	1	0	7	134	259	-125	7

=== Results ===
June

1 June 1992

North Harbour	33–16	King Country
Try: Richard Turner (2); Richard Kapa; Tu Nu'uali'itia; Warren Burton; Walter Little; Con: Warren Burton (3/6); Pen: Warren Burton (1/1)		Try: Richard Watts; Dion Mathews; Con: Phil Coffin (1/2); Pen: Phil Coffin (2/2)

Onewa Domain, Takapuna

This game scored 4 point tries

13 June 1992

Waikato	13–20	Auckland
Try: Andrew Strawbridge; Con: Matthew Cooper (1/1); Drop: Matthew Cooper (2/2)		Try: Shane Howarth (2); Pat Lam; Con: Grant Fox (1/3); Pen: Grant Fox (1/1)

Rugby Park, Hamilton

August

8 August 1992

Hawke's Bay	32–22	Wellington
Try: Jamie Saker (2); Con: Jarrod Cunningham (2/2); Pen: Jarrod Cunningham (6/6)		Try: Alama Ieremia; Lolani Koko; Penalty try Con: Simon Mannix (2/3); Pen: Simon Mannix (1/1)

McLean Park, Napier

12 August 1992

North Auckland	9–34	Otago
Pen: Warren Johnston (3/3)		Try: Greg Cooper (2); Jason Wright; David Latta; Con: Greg Cooper (4/4); Pen: Greg Cooper (2/2)

Okara Park, Whangārei

12 August 1992

Waikato	22–17	Canterbury
Try: Wayne Warlow; Brent Anderson; John Mitchell; Con: Brett Craies (1/3)		Try: Greg Smith (2); Con: Craig Philpott (2/2); Pen: Craig Philpott (1/1)

Rugby Park, Hamilton

15 August 1992

King Country	22–9	Hawke's Bay
Try: Jason Wells; Simon Bradley; Con: Phil Coffin (0/2); Pen: Phil Coffin (4/4)		Pen: Jarrod Cunningham (3/3)

Rugby Park, Te Kūiti

15 August 1992

North Auckland	24–16	Canterbury
Try: Quinten Going; Michael Younger; Richard Le Bas; Con: Warren Johnston (3/3); Drop: Richard Le Bas (1/1)		Try: Paula Bale; Rob Penney; Con: Shayne Philpott (0/2); Pen: Shayne Philpott (2/2)

Okara Park, Whangārei

15 August 1992

North Harbour	30–8	Otago
Try: Richard Kapa; Richard Turner; Tu Nu'uali'itia; Con: Warren Burton (2/3); Pen: Warren Burton (2/2)		Try: Paul Cooke; Con: Greg Cooper (0/1); Pen: Greg Cooper (1/1)

Onewa Domain, Takapuna

15 August 1992

Wellington	17–9	Auckland
Try: Lolani Koko; Con: Simon Mannix (0/1); Pen: Simon Mannix (4/4)		Pen: John Carter (3/3)

Athletic Park, Wellington

22 August 1992

Hawke's Bay	29–21	North Auckland
Try: Mick Dennehy; Huia Gordon; Murdoch Paewai; Con: Jarrod Cunningham (1/3); Pen: Jarrod Cunningham (4/4)		Try: Michael Younger; Richard Le Bas; Con: Warren Johnston (1/2); Pen: Warren Johnston (3/3)

McLean Park, Napier

22 August 1992

Waikato	17–30	North Harbour
Try: Darren Henare; Con: Matthew Cooper (0/1); Pen: Matthew Cooper (4/4)		Try: Walter Little (2); Frank Bunce; Eric Rush; Con: Warren Burton (2/4); Pen: Warren Burton (2/2)

Rugby Park, Hamilton

22 August 1992

Canterbury	v	King Country
Try: Shayne Philpott; Todd Blackadder; Con: Greg Coffey (2/2); Pen: Greg Coffey (2/2)		Try: Simon Bradley (2); Joeli Veitayaki; Con: Phil Coffin (0/3); Pen: Phil Coffin (2/2); Drop: Kurt McQuilkin (1/1)

Lancaster Park, Christchurch

22 August 1992

Auckland	21–16	Otago
Try: Terry Wright; Eroni Clarke; Mark Carter; Con: Grant Fox (0/3); Pen: Grant Fox (2/2)		Try: Paul Cooke; Con: Greg Cooper (1/1); Pen: Greg Cooper (3/3)

Eden Park, Auckland
Attendance: 33,000
Referee: Alan Riley (Waikato)

25 August 1992

King Country	23–18	North Auckland
Try: Simon Bradley; Kurt McQuilkin; Con: Phil Coffin (2/2); Pen: Phil Coffin (2/2); Drop: Chris Wills (1/1)		Try: Quinten Going; Norm Berryman; Con: Warren Johnston (1/2); Pen: Warren Johnston (2/2)

Rugby Park, Te Kūiti

26 August 1992

Canterbury	27–11	North Harbour
Try: Todd Blackadder; Tala Kele; Con: Greg Coffey (1/2); Pen: Greg Coffey (5/5)		Try: Walter Little; Con: Warren Burton (0/1); Pen: Warren Burton (2/2)

Lancaster Park, Christchurch

29 August 1992

Hawke's Bay	9–40	Auckland
Pen: Jarrod Cunningham (3/3)		Try: Shane Howarth; Terry Wright; Jason Hewett; Mark Carter; Con: Grant Fox (3/4); Pen: Grant Fox (2/2); Drop: Terry Wright (1/1)

McLean Park, Napier
Attendance: 13,000
Referee: Colin Hawke (South Canterbury)

29 August 1992

North Harbour	26–23	Wellington
Try: Timo Tagaloa; Myles Ferris; Ian Calder; Con: Ian Calder (1/3); Pen: Ian Calder (3/3)		Try: Isaac Adams; Kelley Rolleston; Con: Simon Mannix (2/2); Pen: Simon Mannix (2/2); Drop: Simon Mannix (1/1)

Onewa Domain, Takapuna

29 August 1992

North Auckland	22–63	Waikato
Try: Duncan Bell (2); Mark Seymour; Con: Warren Johnston (2/3); Pen: Warren Johnston (1/1)		Try: Wayne Warlow (2); John Mitchell (2); Matthew Cooper; Richard Loe; Rodney McIntosh; Darren Henare; Con: Matthew Cooper (7/8); Pen: Matthew Cooper (3/3)

Okara Park, Whangārei

September

1 September 1992

King Country	15–42	Auckland
Pen: Phil Coffin (5/5)		Try: Shane Howarth; Terry Wright; Eroni Clarke; John Kirwan; Con: Grant Fox (4/4); Pen: Grant Fox (2/2); Drop: Shane Howarth (1/1)

Owen Delany Park, Taupō
Attendance: 8,000
Referee: Mike Fitzgibbon (Canterbury)

1 September 1992

Canterbury	15–27	Otago
Pen: Greg Coffey (5/5)		Try: Paul Cooke (2); Stephen Bachop; Con: Greg Cooper (3/3); Pen: Greg Cooper (2/2)

Lancaster Park, Christchurch

2 September 1992

Wellington	10–39	Waikato
Try: Lolani Koko; Con: Simon Mannix (1/1); Pen: Simon Mannix (1/1)		Try: Tom Coventry (3); Brent Anderson; Eugene Martin; Con: Matthew Cooper (4/5); Pen: Matthew Cooper (2/2)

Athletic Park, Wellington

5 September 1992

Waikato	52–10	King Country
Try: Doug Wilson (3); Andrew Strawbridge (2); Wayne Warlow (2); Con: Matthew Cooper (4/7); Pen: Matthew Cooper (3/3)		Try: Joeli Veitayaki; Con: Phil Coffin (1/1); Pen: Phil Coffin (1/1)

Rugby Park, Hamilton

5 September 1992

Otago	20–17	Wellington
Try: John Timu; Marc Ellis; Con: Greg Cooper (2/2); Pen: Greg Cooper (2/2)		Try: Simon Tremain; Ofisa Tonu'u; Con: Steve Hirini (1/2); Pen: Steve Hirini (1/1)

Carisbrook, Dunedin

5 September 1992

Canterbury	34–9	Hawke's Bay
Try: Paula Bale (2); Kose Seinafo; Con: Greg Coffey (2/2); Pen: Greg Coffey (5/5)		Pen: Jarrod Cunningham (3/3)

Lancaster Park, Christchurch

5 September 1992

Auckland	49–3	North Auckland
Try: Terry Wright (3); Robin Brooke (2); Shane Howarth; Con: Grant Fox (5/6); Pen: Grant Fox (3/3)		Pen: Warren Johnston (1/1)

Eden Park, Auckland
Attendance: 11,000
Referee: Grant Lempriere (Manawatu)

9 September 1992

North Auckland	24–28	North Harbour
Try: Norm Berryman; Adrian Going; Con: Warren Johnston (1/2); Pen: Warren Johnston (4/4)		Try: Dyrol Lowe; Timo Tagaloa; Frank Bunce; Con: Ian Calder (2/3); Pen: Ian Calder (3/3)

Okara Park, Whangārei

9 September 1992

Otago	36–16	Hawke's Bay
Try: Paul Cooke; Marc Ellis; Stephen Bachop; Con: Greg Cooper (2/3); Pen: Greg Cooper (4/4)		Try: Jeff Karika; Con: Jarrod Cunningham (1/1); Pen: Jarrod Cunningham (3/3)

Carisbrook, Dunedin

12 August 1992

King Country	13–43	Wellington
Try: Kurt McQuilkin; Con: Phil Coffin (1/1); Pen: Phil Coffin (2/2)		Try: Alama Ieremia; Tala Leiasamaivao; Simon Mannix; Paul Schmidt-Uili; Con: Simon Mannix (4/4); Pen: Simon Mannix (5/5)

Rugby Park, Te Kūiti

12 September 1992

Otago	34–18	Waikato
Try: Marc Ellis (2); Stephen Bachop (2); Paul Cooke; Con: Greg Cooper (3/5); Pen: Greg Cooper (1/1)		Try: Doug Wilson; Wayne Warlow; Con: Matthew Cooper (1/2); Pen: Matthew Cooper (2/2)

Carisbrook, Dunedin

12 September 1992

Auckland	47–38	Canterbury
Try: Shane Howarth; Sean Fitzpatrick; Jason Hewett; Grant Fox; Penalty try Con: Grant Fox (5/5); Pen: Grant Fox (4/4)		Try: Craig Philpott; Dion Kerr; Shayne Philpott; Wiremu Maunsell; Con: Greg Coffey (2/3); Graeme Bachop (1/1); Pen: Greg Coffey (4/4)

Eden Park, Auckland
Attendance: 22,000
Referee: David Bishop (Southland)

13 September 1992

North Harbour	48–17	Hawke's Bay
Try: Eric Rush (3); Timo Tagaloa (2); Richard Turner; Ant Strachan; Con: Walter Little (5/7); Pen: Walter Little (1/1)		Try: Terrence Taylor; Jarrod Cunningham; Con: Jarrod Cunningham (2/2); Pen: Jarrod Cunningham (1/1)

Onewa Domain, Takapuna

19 September 1992

Hawke's Bay	10–44	Waikato
Try: Peter Davis; Con: Jarrod Cunningham (1/1); Pen: Jarrod Cunningham (1/1)		Try: Darren Henare (2); Rhys Ellison; John Mitchell; Richard Loe; Con: Matthew Cooper (4/5); Pen: Matthew Cooper (2/2)

McLean Park, Napier

19 September 1992

Otago	28–21	King Country
Try: Greg Cooper; Paul Cooke; Arran Pene; Andrew Rich; Con: Greg Cooper (1/4); Pen: Greg Cooper (2/2)		Try: Glynn Meads; Joeli Veitayaki; Con: Phil Coffin (0/1); Pen: Phil Coffin (2/2)

Carisbrook, Dunedin

19 September 1992

Auckland	25–16	North Harbour
Try: John Kirwan; Con: Grant Fox (1/1); Pen: Grant Fox (6/6)		Try: Ant Strachan; Con: Walter Little (1/1); Pen: Walter Little (3/3)

Eden Park, Auckland
Attendance: 43,000
Referee: Lindsay McLachlan (Otago)

19 September 1992

Wellington	34–30	Canterbury
Try: Ofisa Tonu'u (2); Paul Schmidt-Uili; Alama Ieremia; Phil Proctor; Con: Simon Mannix (2/4); Steve Hirini (1/1); Pen: Simon Mannix (1/1)		Try: Shayne Philpott; Wiremu Maunsell; Todd Blackadder; Con: Greg Coffey (3/3); Pen: Greg Coffey (3/3)

Athletic Park, Wellington

=== Finals ===
Semi-finals

26 September 1992

Auckland	21–27	Waikato
Pen: Grant Fox (7/7)		Try: Wayne Warlow; Simon Crabb (2); Con: Matthew Cooper (3/3); Pen: Matthew Cooper (2/2)

Eden Park, Auckland
Attendance: 10,000
Referee: Lindsay McLachlan (Otago)

27 September 1992

Otago	26–23	North Harbour
Try: Greg Cooper; Paul Cooke; Con: Greg Cooper (2/2); Pen: Greg Cooper (3/3); Drop: John Timu (1/1)		Try: Ant Strachan; Walter Little; Con: Walter Little (2/2); Pen: Walter Little (3/3)

Carisbrook, Dunedin
Attendance: 20,000
Referee: Colin Hawke (South Canterbury)

Final

4 October 1992

Waikato	40–5	Otago
Try: Ian Foster; Richard Loe; Simon Crabb (2); Con: Matthew Cooper (4/4); Pen: Matthew Cooper (3/3); Drop: Ian Foster (1/1); Cards: John Mitchell (yellow card)		Try: Stu Forster; Con: Marc Ellis (0/1)

Rugby Park, Hamilton
Attendance: 30,000
Referee: David Bishop (Southland)

== Division 2 ==
The following table gives the final standings:

Qualified for semi-finals
Relegated to Division Three

Pos	Team	Pld	W	D	L	PF	PA	PD	Pts
1	Taranaki	8	7	0	1	317	150	+167	29
2	Counties	8	7	0	1	317	91	+226	29
3	Bay of Plenty	8	5	0	3	171	128	+43	21
4	Manawatu	8	5	0	3	263	202	+61	21
5	Southland	8	5	0	3	283	161	+122	21
6	South Canterbury	8	4	0	4	216	230	-14	17
7	Wairarapa Bush	8	2	0	6	143	325	-182	8
8	Poverty Bay	8	1	0	7	100	382	-282	4
9	Thames Valley	8	0	0	8	133	274	-141	1

=== Results ===
May

23 May 1992

Manawatu	32–25	Thames Valley
Try: Phil Doyle (2); Karl Williams; Steve Maxwell; Steven Hall; Danny Love; Con: Danny Love (0/6); Pen: Danny Love (3/3)		Try: Mark Darrah; Dave McCallum; Irvine Campbell; Con: David East (2/3); Pen: David East (3/3)

Palmerston North Showgrounds, Palmerston North

August

8 August 1992

Bay of Plenty	19–21	Taranaki
Try: Peter Woods; Con: Andy Miller (1/1); Pen: Andy Miller (4/4)		Pen: Jamie Cameron (7/7)

Rugby Park, Rotorua

12 August 1992

Thames Valley	14–31	Counties
Try: Glen Dalgety; Con: Glen Dalgety (0/1); Pen: Glen Dalgety (3/3)		Try: Errol Brain; Luke Erenavula; Con: Brett Crawford (2/2); Pen: Brett Crawford (4/4)

Paeroa Domain, Paeroa

12 August 1992

South Canterbury	55–10	Wairarapa Bush
Try: Craig Dorgan (3); Stephen Todd; John Mawhinney; Steve Tarrant; John Simpson; Brendan Laney; Con: David Hunter (3/8); Pen: David Hunter (2/2); David Monteath (1/1)		Try: Mike Foster; Con: Neil Foote (1/1); Pen: Neil Foote (1/1)

Fraser Park, Timaru

12 August 1992

Southland	79–5	Poverty Bay
Try: Simon Forrest (5); Wayne Miller (2); Simon Culhane (2); Phil Johnston; Paul Henderson; Grant Beardsley; Con: Simon Culhane (5/12); Pen: Simon Culhane (3/3)		Try: Aaron Collins; Con: Shane Brown (0/1)

Rugby Park, Invercargill

15 August 1992

South Canterbury	35–6	Poverty Bay
Try: Brendan Laney (3); Craig Dorgan; Garry Stanley; Con: David Hunter (5/5)		Pen: Api Rangihuna (2/2)

Fraser Park, Timaru

15 August 1992

Southland	31–11	Wairarapa Bush
Try: Simon Forrest; Jeff Wilson; Phil Johnston; Paul Henderson; Con: Simon Culhane (1/4); Pen: Simon Culhane (2/2); Grant Beardsley (1//1)		Try: James Shirkey; Con: Neil Foote (0/1); Pen: Neil Foote (1/1); Drop: Greg Gray (1/1)

Rugby Park, Invercargill

15 August 1992

Manawatu	15–18	Bay of Plenty
Try: Sam Doyle; Paul Crosswell; Con: Jody Smith (1/2); Pen: Jody Smith (1/1)		Try: Damon Kaui; Dean Oswald; Martin Jones; Con: Andy Miller (0/3); Pen: Andy Miller (1/1)

Palmerston North Showgrounds, Palmerston North

15 August 1992

Counties	11–17	Taranaki
Try: Luke Erenavula; Con: Dean Sheppard (0/1); Pen: Dean Sheppard (2/2)		Try: Gary Mellow; Con: Jamie Cameron (0/1); Pen: Jamie Cameron (1/1); Peter Wisnewski (3/3)

Pukekohe Stadium, Pukekohe

19 August 1992

Bay of Plenty	13–38	Counties
Try: Steve Axtens; Con: Andy Miller (1/1); Pen: Andy Miller (2/2)		Try: Ora John; Jim Coe; Carlos Hassan; Junior Paramore; Luke Erenavula; Con: Dean Sheppard (2/4); Pen: Dean Sheppard (3/3)

Rugby Park, Rotorua

22 August 1992

Thames Valley	6–52	Southland
Pen: Glen Dalgety (2/2)		Try: Phil Johnston (3); Eric Todd (2); Grant Beardsley; Paul Henderson; Simon Forrest; Con: Grant Beardsley (2/7); Simon Culhane (1/1); Pen: Grant Beardsley (2/2)

Rhodes Park, Thames

22 August 1992

Poverty Bay	20–77	Manawatu
Try: Aaron Collins; Brett Mataira; Con: Api Rangihuna (1/2); Pen: Api Rangihuna (1/1)		Try: Carl Izatt (3); George Konia; Pita Lloyd; Stu Cruden; Dean Coleman; Lee Stensness; Mana Otai; Phil Doyle; Paul Alston; Con: Sam Doyle (4/4); Jody Smith (3/6); Phonse Carroll (1/1); Pen: Jody Smith (2/2)

Rugby Park, Gisborne

22 August 1992

Wairarapa Bush	3–33	Bay of Plenty
Pen: Neil Foote (1/1)		Try: Vern Cotter (2); Rex George (2); Milton Haig; Con: Andy Miller (4/5)

Memorial Park, Masterton

22 August 1992

Taranaki	41–27	South Canterbury
Try: Aaron Whiteman; Grant Paterson; Jamie Cameron; Bull Allen; Con: Jamie Cameron (3/4); Pen: Jamie Cameron (5/5)		Try: Brendan Laney; David Hunter; Craig Dorgan; Alister Stevenson; Con: David Hunter (2/4); Pen: David Hunter (1/1)

Rugby Park, New Plymouth

25 August 1992

Counties	36–14	Southland
Try: Luke Erenavula (3); Afa Leu'u; Andrew Roose; Mark Cooksley; Con: Dean Sheppard (3/6)		Try: Phil Johnston; David Henderson; Con: Simon Culhane (2/2)

Pukekohe Stadium, Pukekohe

26 August 1992

Thames Valley	25–31	South Canterbury
Try: Scott Honeybun; Roger Wilton; Mike Crawford; Con: Glen Dalgety (2/3); Pen: Glen Dalgety (2/2)		Try: Craig Dorgan (2); Brendan Laney (2); Con: David Hunter (4/4); Pen: David Hunter (1/1)

Paeroa Domain, Paeroa

26 August 1992

Poverty Bay	13–54	Taranaki
Try: Richard Riwaka; Con: Api Rangihuna (1/1); Pen: Api Rangihuna (2/2)		Try: Tony Martin; Dwight Murfitt; Darren Mann; Bull Allen; Andy Slater; Richard Jarman; Aaron Whiteman; Shane McDonald; Con: Kerry Eynon (3/7); Chris Sutton (1/1); Pen: Kerry Eynon (1/1); Chris Sutton (1/1)

Rugby Park, Gisborne

29 August 1992

Wairarapa Bush	16–48	Manawatu
Try: Marty Berry; Matthew Hoggard; Con: Neil Foote (0/2); Pen: Neil Foote (2/2)		Try: Sam Doyle (3); George Konia; Lee Stensness; Karl Williams; Steven Hall; Mana Otai; Con: Phonse Carroll (4/8)

Memorial Park, Masterton

29 August 1992

Bay of Plenty	35–5	Poverty Bay
Try: Adrian Cashmore; Shane Stone; Andrew Young; Mike Howe; Con: Adrian Cashmore (3/4); Pen: Adrian Cashmore (3/3)		Try: Ron Tamatea; Con: Shane Brown (0/1)

Rugby Park, Whakatāne

29 August 1992

Taranaki	31–12	Thames Valley
Try: Bull Allen; Kieran Crowley; Kevin Barrett; Con: Peter Wisnewski (2/2); Kerry Eynon (1/1); Pen: Peter Wisnewski (3/3)		Try: Glen Dalgety (4/4)

Rugby Park, New Plymouth

29 August 1992

Counties	63–5	South Canterbury
Try: Luke Erenavula (2); Errol Brain (2); Carl Murray (2); Henare Leach; Carlos Hassan (2); Andrew Fleming; Dean Sheppard; Con: Dean Sheppard (4/11)		Try: Craig Dorgan; Con: David Hunter (0/1)

Pukekohe Stadium, Pukekohe

September

5 September 1992

Poverty Bay	14–49	Counties
Try: Barry Madden; Con: Shane Brown (0/1); Pen: Shane Brown (2/2); Drop: Shane Brown (1/1)		Try: Dean Sheppard (3); Luke Erenavula (2); Errol Brain (2); Carlos Hassan; Ora John; Con: Dean Sheppard (1/8); Brett Crawford (1/1)

Rugby Park, Gisborne

5 September 1992

Wairarapa Bush	36–22	Thames Valley
Try: Matthew Hoggard; Joseph Huriama; Darren Guildford; Danny Boyle; James Shirkey; Con: Marty Berry (0/4); Neil Foote (1/1); Pen: Marty Berry (3/3)		Try: Scott Honeybun (2); Dave McCallum; Con: Glen Dalgety (2/3); Pen: Glen Dalgety (1/1)

Memorial Park, Masterton

5 September 1992

South Canterbury	24–6	Bay of Plenty
Try: David Hunter; Brendan Laney; Con: David Hunter (1/1); Pen: David Hunter (3/3); Drop: David Hunter (1/1)		Con: Adrian Cashmore (2/2)

Fraser Park, Timaru

5 September 1992

Manawatu	42–12	Southland
Try: Paul Alston; Lee Stensness; Karl Williams; Jody Smith penalty try Con: Jody Smith (4/5); Pen: Jody Smith (3/3)		Pen: Simon Culhane (4/4)

Palmerston North Showgrounds, Palmerston North

9 September 1992

Poverty Bay	25–16	Thames Valley
Try: Merv Dudley; Con: Shane Brown (1/1); Pen: Shane Brown (6/6)		Try: Jason McFetridge; Con: Glen Dalgety (1/1); Pen: Glen Dalgety (3/3)

Rugby Park, Gisborne

9 September 1992

Bay of Plenty	14–9	Southland
Try: Damon Kaui; Con: Adrian Cashmore (0/1); Pen: Adrian Cashmore (3/3)		Pen: Simon Culhane (3/3)

Rugby Park, Rotorua

9 September 1992

Manawatu	0–35	Counties
		Try: Errol Brain (2); Lino Foa'i; Mark Cooksley; Carlos Hassan; Con: Dean Sheppard (2/5); Pen: Dean Sheppard (2/2)

Palmerston North Showgrounds, Palmerston North

12 September 1992

Wairarapa Bush	37–13	Poverty Bay
Try: Andrew Langley (2); Marty Berry; Andy Wharrie; Jason Reedy; Con: Marty Berry (3/5); Pen: Marty Berry (2/2)		Try: Brett Mataira; Johnny Martin; Con: Shane Brown (0/2); Pen: Shane Brown (1/1)

Memorial Park, Masterton

12 September 1992

South Canterbury	12–18	Manawatu
Pen: Chris Gard (4/4)		Try: Paul Alston; Pita Lloyd; Karl Williams; Con: Jody Smith (0/3); Pen: Jody Smith (1/1)

Fraser Park, Timaru

12 September 1992

Southland	25–20	Taranaki
Try: Bobby Murrell; Jeff Wilson; Con: Simon Culhane (0/2); Pen: Simon Culhane (4/4); Drop: Simon Culhane (1/1)		Try: Kieran Crowley; Shane McDonald; Con: Peter Wisnewski (2/2); Pen: Peter Wisnewski (2/2)

Rugby Park, Invercargill

16 September 1992

Taranaki	69–15	Wairarapa Bush
Try: Richard Te Ngahue (3); Bull Allen (2); Richard Jarman (2); Jamie Cameron; Shane McDonald; Tony Martin; Con: Jamie Cameron (6/8); Peter Wisnewski (2/2); Pen: Peter Wisnewski (1/1)		Try: Marty Berry; Vern Boyce; Con: Matthew Hoggard (1/1); Pen: Matthew Hoggard (1/1)

Rugby Park, New Plymouth

19 September 1992

Thames Valley	13–33	Bay of Plenty
Try: Jason McFetridge; Greg Ellis; Con: Glen Dalgety (0/2); Pen: Glen Dalgety (1/1)		Try: Ross Symington; Dean Oswald; Damon Kaui; Peter Woods; Ray Peacock; Con: Adrian Cashmore (4/5)

Paeroa Domain, Paeroa

19 September 1992

Southland	61–27	South Canterbury
Try: Jeff Wilson (2); Simon Forrest (2); Eric Todd; Simon Culhane; Grant Beardsley; Bobby Murrell; Con: Simon Culhane (3/8); Pen: Simon Culhane (4/4); Grant Beardsley (1/1)		Try: Craig Dorgan; John Mawhinney; Brendan Laney; Con: Chris Gard (3/3); Pen: Chris Gard (2/2)

Rugby Park, Invercargill

19 September 1992

Counties	54–15	Wairarapa Bush
Try: Gary Millington; Errol Brain; Jim Coe; Mark Cooksley; Junior Paramore; Lino Foa'i; Brett Crawford; Con: Dean Sheppard (5/7); Pen: Dean Sheppard (3/3)		Try: Darren Guildford; Jason Reedy; Con: Marty Berry (1/1); Pen: Marty Berry (1/1)

Pukekohe Stadium, Pukekohe

20 September 1992

Taranaki	64–28	Manawatu
Try: Kieran Crowley (2); Kevin Barrett (2); Shane McDonald (2); Nathan Hill; Tony Martin; Con: Jamie Cameron (6/8); Pen: Jamie Cameron (4/4)		Try: Sam Doyle; Jody Smith; Karl Williams; Jason Chandler; Con: Jody Smith (4/4)

Rugby Park, New Plymouth

=== Finals ===
Semi-finals

26 September 1992

Counties	31–29	Bay of Plenty
Try: Luke Erenavula; Junior Paramore; Ora John; Con: Dean Sheppard (2/3); Pen: Dean Sheppard (4/4)		Try: Damon Kaui; Dean Oswald; Adrian Cashmore; Con: Adrian Cashmore (1/3); Pen: Adrian Cashmore (4/4)

Pukekohe Stadium, Pukekohe
Attendance: 3,150
Referee: Grant Lemprerie (Manawatu)

26 September 1992

Manawatu	18–29	Taranaki
Try: Stu Cruden (2); Con: Jody Smith (1/2); Pen: Jody Smith (2/2)		Try: Dwight Murfitt; Bull Allen (2); Richard Jarman; Con: Peter Wisnewski (3/4); Pen: Kelvin Mahon (1/1)

Palmerston North Showgrounds, Palmerston North
Attendance: 3,000
Referee: Alan Riley (Waikato)

Final

3 October 1992

Taranaki	12–0	Counties
Pen: Kelvin Mahon (4/4)

Rugby Park, New Plymouth
Attendance: 9,000
Referee: Terry Marshall (Canterbury)

== Division 3 ==
The following table gives the final standings:

Qualified for semi-finals

Pos	Team	Pld	W	D	L	PF	PA	PD	Pts
1	Nelson Bays	8	8	0	0	328	94	+234	32
2	Wanganui	8	7	0	1	306	101	+205	28
3	Horowhenua	8	6	0	2	244	121	+123	24
4	Mid Canterbury	8	5	0	3	165	113	+52	20
5	Buller	8	4	0	4	154	129	+25	17
6	Marlborough	8	3	0	5	198	192	+6	13
7	East Coast	8	2	0	6	160	243	+83	8
8	North Otago	8	1	0	7	113	309	-196	5
9	West Coast	8	0	0	8	47	413	366	0

=== Results ===
June

1 June 1992

West Coast	3–31	Buller
Pen: Michael Foster (1/1)		Try: Thomas Stuart (4); Con: Craig Neill (3/4); Pen: Craig Neill (3/3)

Rugby Park, Greymouth

This game scored 4 point tries

July

29 July 1992

Wanganui	57–18	Horowhenua
Try: Thomas Scott (2); Bruce Hansen (2); Slade Sturmey (2); Nigel Ward; Brent Scott; Roger Byam; Con: Guy Lennox (6/9)		Try: Kere Akuhata; Sam Tovo; Trevor Mason; Con: Chris Graham (0/3); Pen: Chris Graham (1/1)

Cooks Gardens, Wanganui

August

5 August 1992

Horowhenua	46–15	East Coast
Try: Cory Kennett (3); Aaron Hirini; Stu Palmer; Carlos Spencer; Con: Carlos Spencer (5/6); Pen: Carlos Spencer (2/2)		Con: Morgan Waitoa; Jack Higgins; Pen: Eli Manuel (1/2); Drop: Eli Manuel (1/1)

Levin Domain, Levin

11 August 1992

Buller	8–10	Mid Canterbury
Try: Graeme O'Dea; Con: Tony Pratt (0/1); Pen: Tony Pratt (1/1)		Try: Gary Burgess; Con: Grant Breach (1/1); Pen: Grant Breach (1/1)

Victoria Square, Westport

12 August 1992

North Otago	18–57	Wanganui
Try: Peter Rowland; Shayne Curle; Con: Craig Hore (0/2); Pen: Craig Hore (3/3)		Try: Neil Bell (4); Jerome Nahona (2); Stu Selby (2); Ralph Wallace; Danny Thompson; Con: Guy Lennox (7/10); Pen: Guy Lennox (1/1)

Centennial Park, Oamaru

15 August 1992

Nelson Bays	92–9	West Coast
Try: Allen Prince (5); Chris Trathen (2); Mark Milne (2); Murray Henderson; Murray Silcock; Dion Mytton; David Rutene; Kyle Byers; Con: Chris Trathen (8/14); Pen: Chris Trathen (2/2)		Pen: Michael Foster (3/3)

Trafalgar Park, Nelson

15 August 1992

Buller	27–3	Marlborough
Try: Thomas Stuart; Penalty try Con: Tony Pratt (1/2); Pen: Tony Pratt (5/5)		Pen: Craig Forsyth (1/1)

Victoria Square, Westport

15 August 1992

Mid Canterbury	6–22	Wanganui
Pen: Grant Breach (1/1); Drop: Richard Ellis (1/1)		Try: Brent Scott; Adrian Bull; Bruce Hansen; Roger Byam; Con: Guy Lennox (1/4)

Ashburton Showgrounds, Ashburton

16 August 1992

North Otago	6–23	Horowhenua
Pen: Craig Hore (2/2)		Try: Mike Chase; Paul Hirini; Con: Carlos Spencer (2/2); Pen: Carlos Spencer (3/3)

Centennial Park, Oamaru

19 August 1992

Nelson Bays	26–13	Horowhenua
Try: David Inch; Kyle Byers; Con: Chris Trathen (1/2); Pen: Chris Trathen (3/3)		Try: Chris Graham; Cory Kennett; Con: Chris Graham (0/2); Pen: Chris Graham (1/1)

Trafalgar Park, Nelson

19 August 1992

West Coast	5–24	Wanganui
Try: Tony Lindbom; Con: Michael Foster (0/1)		Try: Jason Hamlin; Roger Byam; Stu Selby; Penalty try Con: Guy Lennox (2/4)

Cass Square, Hokitika

19 August 1992

North Otago	18–20	East Coast
Try: John Taieloa; Nathan Cunningham; Con: Craig Hore (1/2); Pen: Craig Hore (2/2)		Try: Monty Manuel; Allan Callaghan; Joe Kiwara; Con: Eli Manuel (1/3); Pen: Eli Manuel (1/1)

Centennial Park, Oamaru

22 August 1992

Marlborough	3–35	Horowhenua
Pen: Shane Jones (1/1)		Try: Mike Chase; Trevor Mason; Andrew Hopkins; Paul Hirini; Con: Chris Graham (3/4); Pen: Chris Graham (3/3)

Lansdowne Park, Blenheim

22 August 1992

Buller	28–10	East Coast
Try: Danny Pratt (2); Con: Tony Pratt (0/2); Pen: Tony Pratt (5/5); Drop: Kerry Roche (1/1)		Try: Mani Waititi; Con: Eli Manuel (1/1); Pen: Eli Manuel (1/1)

Victoria Square, Westport

22 August 1992

Mid Canterbury	16–24	Nelson Bays
Try: Grant Lloyd; Con: Grant Breach (1/2); Pen: Grant Breach (3/3)		Try: Murray Henderson; David Rutene; Con: Chris Trathen (1/2); Pen: Chris Trathen (3/3); Drop: Mark Milne (1/1)

Ashburton Showgrounds, Ashburton

25 August 1992

Marlborough	47–3	East Coast
Try: Josh Crimmins (3); Ken Hart; Matthew Kerr; Ken Boyd; Con: Tony Ziolo (4/6); Pen: Tony Ziolo (3/3)		Pen: Eli Manuel (1/1)

Lansdowne Park, Blenheim

26 August 1992

Buller	34–6	North Otago
Try: Warrick Tepping (2); Thomas Stuart; Glen Elley; Con: Tony Pratt (1/4); Pen: Tony Pratt (4/4)		Pen: Craig Hore (2/2)

Victoria Square, Westport

29 August 1992

Wanganui	13–23	Nelson Bays
Try: Guy Lennox; Con: Guy Lennox (1/1); Pen: Guy Lennox (2/2)		Try: Will Dempster; Kyle Byers; Chris Trathen; Con: Chris Trathen (1/3); Pen: Chris Trathen (2/2)

Cooks Gardens, Wanganui

29 August 1992

Mid Canterbury	20–15	Marlborough
Try: Craig Carter; Mark Breach; Con: Grant Breach (2/2); Pen: Grant Breach (2/2)		Pen: Tony Ziolo (5/5)

Ashburton Showgrounds, Ashburton

29 August 1992

West Coast	11–45	North Otago
Try: Michael Foster; Con: Michael Foster (0/1); Pen: Michael Foster (2/2)		Try: Ross Skinner (3); Ross McColl; Jason Drummond; Anton Matthews; Con: Craig Hore (3/6); Pen: Craig Hore (2/2); Drop: Kelvin Mansfield (1/1)

Rugby Park, Greymouth

September

1 September 1992

East Coast	13–35	Nelson Bays
Try: Craig McCarthy; Robert Tuari; Con: Mason Haenga (0/2); Pen: Mason Haenga (1/1)		Try: Gary Ford; Will Dempster; Gregory Win; Craig Williamson; Chris Trathen; Con: Chris Trathen (2/5); Pen: Chris Trathen (2/2)

Hatea-a-Rangi Memorial Park, Tokomaru Bay

2 September 1992

Wanganui	29–0	Buller
Try: Charles Osborne (2); Brent Scott; Stu Selby; Con: Guy Lennox (3/4); Pen: Guy Lennox (1/1)

Cooks Gardens, Wanganui

5 September 1992

East Coast	10–36	Wanganui
Try: Nigel Henare; Harawira Matahiki; Con: Mason Haenga (0/2)		Try: Ralph Wallace (2); Charles Osborne; Tim Cundy; Stu Selby; Con: Guy Lennox (1/5); Pen: Guy Lennox (3/3)

Te Araroa Domain, Te Araroa

5 September 1992

Nelson Bays	69–3	North Otago
Try: Kelvin Farrington (3); Murray Henderson (2); Bevan Cadwallader; Craig Williamson; Mark Milne; Murray Silcock; Ross Lienert; Kyle Byers; Con: Mark Milne (7/11)		Pen: Craig Hore (1/1)

Trafalgar Park, Nelson

5 September 1992

Horowhenua	41–11	Buller
Try: Sam Tovo; Aaron O'Rielly; Paul Hirini; Gerald Baines; Con: Chris Graham (3/4); Pen: Chris Graham (5/5)		Try: Graeme O'Dea; Con: Tony Pratt (0/1); Pen: Tony Pratt (2/2)

Levin Domain, Levin

5 September 1992

West Coast	6–34	Marlborough
Pen: Shaun Fahey (2/2)		Try: Shane Jones; Craig Forsyth; Jason Landon-Lane; Paul O'Fagan; Con: Tony Ziolo (1/4); Pen: Tony Ziolo (4/4)

Rugby Park, Greymouth

8 September 1992

Mid Canterbury	58–10	West Coast
Try: Mark Breach (2); John Smitheram (2); Mark Cousins; Hamish Elliott; Mark Sullivan; Steve MacAskill; Con: Grant Breach (5/8); Pen: Grant Breach (1/1)		Try: Glen Aitken; Michael Foster; Con: Michael Foster (0/2)

Ashburton Showgrounds, Ashburton

8 September 1992

Marlborough	63–11	North Otago
Try: Matthew Kerr (3); Roger Burrows (2); Len Mason; Denis Marfell; Craig Forsyth; Penalty try Con: Tony Ziolo (9/9)		Try: Ross McColl; Con: Craig Hore (0/1); Pen: Craig Hore (2/2)

Lansdowne Park, Blenheim

12 September 1992

Wanganui	58–21	Marlborough
Try: Stu Selby (3); Roger Byam (2); Charles Osborne (2); Danny Thompson; Con: Guy Lennox (3/8); Pen: Guy Lennox (4/4)		Try: Ken Boyd (2); Con: Tony Ziolo (1/1); Pen: Tony Ziolo (3/3)

Cooks Gardens, Wanganui

12 September 1992

East Coast	17–30	Mid Canterbury
Try: Jimmy Kururangi; Harawira Matahiki; Con: Eli Manuel (2/2); Pen: Eli Manuel (1/1)		Try: John Smitheram; Caryl McKibbin; Mark Breach; Ian Howden; Con: Grant Breach (2/4); Pen: Grant Breach (2/2)

George Nepia Memorial Park, Tikitiki

12 September 1992

Nelson Bays	27–15	Buller
Try: Kyle Byers (2); Craig Garner; Pouesi Fitisemanu; Con: Mark Milne (2/4); Pen: Mark Milne (1/1)		Try: Wayne Patterson; Thomas Stuart; Con: Tony Pratt (1/2); Pen: Tony Pratt (1/1)

Trafalgar Park, Nelson

15 September 1992

Horowhenua	12–3	Mid Canterbury
Try: Paul Hirini; Chris Graham; Con: Chris Graham (1/2)		Try: Grant Breach (1/1)

Levin Domain, Levin

16 September 1992

East Coast	72–3	West Coast
Try: Jimmy Kururangi (3); Nigel Henare (2); Morgan Waitoa (2); Robert Tuari (2); Graeme Walker (2); Monty Manuel; Con: Leroy Apiata (2/12); Drop: Eli Manuel (1/1)		Pen: Michael Foster (1/1)

Uawa Reserve, Tolaga Bay

19 September 1992

Marlborough	12–32	Nelson Bays
Pen: Tony Ziolo (4/4)		Try: Allen Prince; Riki Taikato; Ross Lienert; Pouesi Fitisemanu; Murray Silcock; Con: Mark Milne (2/5); Pen: Mark Milne (1/1)

Lansdowne Park, Blenheim

19 September 1992

Horowhenua	57–0	West Coast
Try: Paul Hirini (2); Carlos Spencer (2); Aaron O'Rielly (2); Riki Te Tomo; Willie Fletcher; Hamish Ruawai; Con: Chris Graham (5/8); Carlos Spencer (1/1)

Easton Park, Foxton

19 September 1992

North Otago	5–22	Mid Canterbury
Try: John Taieloa; Con: Craig Hore (0/1)		Try: John Smitheram (2); Mark Sullivan; Con: Grant Breach (2/2); Pen: Grant Breach (1/1)

Centennial Park, Oamaru

=== Finals ===
Semi-finals

26 September 1992

Horowhenua	30–22	Wanganui
Try: Riki Te Tomo (3); Con: Chris Graham (3/3); Pen: Chris Graham (3/3)		Try: Jason Hamlin; Stu Selby; Danny Thompson; Bruce Hansen; Con: Guy Lennox (1/4)

Levin Domain, Levin
Attendance: 1,000
Referee: Jim Taylor (Counties)

26 September 1992

Nelson Bays	27–13	Mid Canterbury
Try: Kelvin Farrington; Mark Milne; Murray Henderson; Steve Berkett; Con: Mark Milne (2/4); Pen: Mark Milne (1/1)		Try: Ian Howden; Con: Grant Breach (1/1); Pen: Grant Breach (2/2)

Trafalgar Park, Nelson
Referee: Paddy O'Brien (North Otago)

Final

3 October 1992

Horowhenua	23–25	Nelson Bays
Try: Aaron O'Reilly; Chris Graham; Con: Chris Graham (2/2); Pen: Chris Graham (3/3)		Try: Colin Lott; Mark Milne; Dion Mytton; Con: Mark Milne (2/3); Pen: Mark Milne (2/2)

Levin Domain, Levin
Attendance: 4,000
Referee: Steve Walsh (Wellington)

== Promotion/relegation ==
Division Two winner Taranaki were promoted to Division One to replace North Auckland who were relegated. Division Three winner Nelson Bays were elevated to Division Two to replace Thames Valley who were relegated.
