= New Zealand Heartland XV =

NZ representative rugby union team

New Zealand
- Union: New Zealand Rugby Union
- Coach: (New Zealand) David Harrison
- Captain(s): (New Zealand) Declan McCormack, Mid Canterbury
- Most caps: (-)
- Top scorer: (-)
Team kit	Change kit

Official website
- www.allblacks.com/teams/heartland-xv/

The Heartland XV is one of several New Zealand representative rugby union teams, although it is at a lower level than the All Blacks and the Māori All Blacks. The side is drawn exclusively from players for provincial unions that compete in the Heartland Championship, a nominally amateur domestic competition below the fully professional National Provincial Championship (NPC).

== History ==
Founded in 1988 and originally known as the New Zealand Divisional XV, it was designed to expose players from Divisions Two and Three in the Air New Zealand National Provincial Championship (NPC) to rugby at a higher level.

As well as playing local and international teams that may visit (such as Ireland and Italy in 2002) the New Zealand Divisional XV also toured Australia, Canada and various Pacific Islands.

Upon the 2006 reorganisation of the NPC into the Air New Zealand Cup and Heartland Championship, the side was revamped into a Heartland-only side and received its current name.

The first team known as the New Zealand Heartland XV side toured the Pacific Islands in 2005 and they played six games (which they won), including matches against Tonga and Fiji. The team then toured Argentina in 2006 and the United States in 2008, beating the Pacific Coast Grizzlies and a USA Select XV. They have subsequently toured Pacific Islands.

== Results ==
Date	Opponent	F	A	Venue	Notes/references
1988-10-13	Cook Islands XV	56	4	Rarotonga	1988 tour to Cook Islands, Tonga and Fiji
1988-10-15	Cook Islands	9	6	Rarotonga	
1988-10-20	Presidents Selection	28	8	Teufaiva	
1988-10-22	Tonga	25	8	Nuku'alofa	
1988-10-26	Nadi	30	16	Nadi	
1988-10-29	Fiji	24	20	Suva	
1989-4-1	Waikato	25	32	Hamilton	
1990-3-18	Poverty Bay	55	6	Gisborne	
1990-3-21	Western Samoa	57	9	Taupō	
1990-3-24	Counties	45	4	Pukekohe	
1991-3-18	Australian Capital Territory	13	18	Canberra	1991 Australian tour
1991-3-21	New South Wales Country	31	17	Batemans Bay	
1991-3-24	Victoria	40	4	Melbourne	
1991-3-27	South Australia	43	0	Adelaide	
1991-4-1	Sydney	19	45	Sydney	
1992-3-22	Thames Valley	30	6	Te Aroha	
1992-3-25	Waikato Rugby Union	30	30	Hamilton	
1992-3-29	Counties	20	17	Pukekohe	
1993-4-18	King Country	70	8	Otorohanga	
1993-4-21	Hawke's Bay	35	18	Napier	
1993-4-25	Wellington	34	22	Wellington	
1993-10-16	Presidents XV	66	0	Nuku'alofa	1993 tour of Tonga, Fiji, Rarotonga and Samoa
1993-10-19	Tonga	18	21	Nuku'alofa	
1993-10-23	Western Division	31	29	Nandi	
1993-10-26	Eastern Division	39	3	Suva	
1993-10-28	Presidents XV	30	24	Rarotonga	
1993-10-30	Cook Islands	26	15	Rarotonga	
1993-11-3	Western Samoa Presidents XV	35	26	Apia	
1995-3-15	British Columbia Presidents XV	84	6	Abbotsford	1995 tour to Canada and Fiji tour
1995-3-18	British Columbia	16	16	Vancouver	
1995-3-25	Fiji XV	10	7	Suva	
1995-3-28	Fiji XV	19	23	Nadi	
1995-4-1	NZRU President's XV	71	22	Wanganui	
1996-7-10	Otago	18	23	Dunedin	
1996-7-13	North Otago Invitation XV	25	33	Dunedin	
1996-7-16	Canterbury	33	27	Timaru	
1997	No matches were played				
1998	No matches were played				
1999	No matches were played				
2000-11-15	Apia XV	47	11	Apia	2000 tour to Samoa and Tonga
2000-11-18	Samoa XV	30	23	Apia	
2000-11-22	Tonga XV	17	34	Nuku'alofa	
2001	No matches were played				
2002-6-2	Italy XV	35	35	Palmerston North	2002 Italy rugby union tour of New Zealand
2002-6-6	Ireland XV	3	56	Timaru	2002 Ireland rugby union tour of New Zealand
2003-03-31	Samoa	27	30	Pukekohe	
2003-06-07	Tonga	10	10	Napier	
2004-11-6	Fiji	34	25	Suva	2004 Fiji tour
2004-11-10	Fiji A	13	16	Suva	
2004-11-13	Fiji	22	61	Nadi	
2005-10-29	Fiji Pacific Warriors	11	24	Prince Charles Park, Nadi	2005 Fiji tour
2005-11-13	Fiji	29	39	Churchill Park, Lautoka	
2006-11-1	Salta	39	5	Salta	2006 Argentina Tour
2006-11-11	Tucuman	13	35	Tucuman	
2006-11-11	Argentina A	5	39	Rosario	
2007	No matches were played				
2008-11-4	Pacific Coast Grizzlies	35	12	San Francisco	2008 USA tour
2008-11-8	United States Select XV	19	14	Salt Lake City	
2009-11-14	New Zealand Marist	11	23	Masterton	
2010-11-6	New Zealand Marist	22	31	Wanganui	
2010-11-0	New Zealand Defence Force	47	13	Levin	
2011-10-15	New Zealand Marist	14	15	Pukekohe	
2012-11-03	New Zealand Marist	15	10	College Rifles Rugby Club, Auckland	
2012-11-07	Apia	21	23	Apia	2012 Samoa tour
2012-11-13	Samoa A	17	13	Apia	
2013-11-06	New Zealand Defence Force	60	34	Methven	
2013-11-09	New Zealand Marist	25	12	Timaru	
2014-11-08	New Zealand Marist	46	31	Albany	
2014-11-11	Cook Islands Residents XV	64	6	BCI National Stadium, Nikao, Rarotonga	2014 tour to Rarotonga
2014-11-14	Cook Islands Residents XV	20	33	BCI National Stadium, Nikao, Rarotonga	
2015-11-07	New Zealand Marist	47	42	Masterton	
2015-11-10	Australian Barbarians	32	38	Levin	
2015-11-13	Australian Barbarians	24	40	Cooks Gardens, Whanganui	
2016-11-5	New Zealand Marist	35	14	Ardmore Marist Rugby Club, Papakura	McRea Cup
2016-11-08	Nadi	26	19	Nadi	2016 Fiji tour
2016-11-11	Nadroga	22	26	Lawaqa Park, Sigatoka	
2017-11-04	New Zealand Marist	41	39	Timaru	McRea Cup
2018-11-01	Vanua Fiji XV	60	0	Owen Delany Park, Taupō	
2018-11-05	New Zealand Marist	46	19	Taupō	McRea Cup
2019-08-31	Samoa	19	36	Eden Park, Auckland	
2019-11-02	New Zealand Marist	19	29	Boyd Park, Te Aroha	
2019-11-07	Vanua Fiji XV	12	7	Lautoka Churchill Park	2019 tour to Fiji
2019-11-09	Vanua Fiji XV	7	15	Sigatoka Lawaqa Park	
2020	No matches were played				COVID-19 restrictions
2021-12-05	New Zealand Barbarians	24	36	Owen Delany Park, Taupō	
2022-11-06	New Zealand Police	84	14	Owen Delany Park, Taupō	
2023-11-04	New Zealand Barbarians	26	49	Oamaru	
2024-10-29	New Zealand Maori Selection	14	47	Cooks Gardens, Whanganui	
2024-11-03	New Zealand Barbarians	21	40	Cooks Gardens, Whanganui	
2025-11-04	Samoa President's XV	31	14	Apia Park, Samoa	2025 tour to Samoa
2025-11-08	Samoa XV	31	14	Apia Park, Samoa	

== Notable past players ==
Before the advent of professional Super Rugby in 1996 and the later change from three divisions of National Provincial Rugby to the current competition structure it was common for past, future or even current All Blacks to play for the New Zealand Divisional team.

Player	Province	Year	Other teams
Mark Allen	Taranaki	1996(c)	All Blacks
Brent Anderson	Wairarapa Bush	1988	All Blacks
Con Barrell	North Auckland/Northland	1993-95	All Blacks
Kevin Barrett	Taranaki	1996	Hurricanes (father of Beauden, Jordie and Scott Barrett)
Marty Berry	Wairarapa Bush	1992	All Blacks
Norm Berryman	Northland	1995-96	All Blacks
Todd Blackadder	Nelson Bays	1991	Captain of Crusaders and All Blacks
Jamie Cameron	Taranaki	1996	North Harbour, Taranaki, Hurricanes
Jim Coe	Counties	1993	Blues, Māori All Blacks
Phil Coffin	King Country	1991-92	All Blacks
Mark Cooksley	Counties	1993	All Blacks
Matthew Cooper	Hawkes Bay	1988	All Blacks
Eion Crossan	Southland	1989-90	NZ XV and NZ B Teams 1991, South Sydney Rabbitohs, Cronulla-Sutherland Sharks
Simon Culhane	Southland	1992-96	All Blacks
Jarrod Cunningham	Hawkes Bay	1995-96	Blues, Hurricanes, NZ Maori
Craig Dorgan	South Canterbury	1988-91	NZ Colts, All Black trialist
Sam Doyle	Manawatu	1992-93	Wellington, Hurricanes, Māori All Blacks
Luke Erenavula	Counties	1993	All Black Trialist, Fiji
Gordon Falcon	Hawkes Bay	1991-96	Māori All Blacks, All Black trialist, Penrith Panthers
Billy Guyton	North Otago	2010-12	Māori All Blacks
John Hainsworth	Wanganui	1993	Wellington, NZ Juniors, NZ Emerging Players
Bruce Hansen	Wanganui	1988-95	Hurricanes, NZ XV, All Black trialist
David Henderson	Southland	1992	South Island
Paul Henderson	Southland	1989-95	All Blacks
Jason Hewett	Manawatu	1989-90	All Blacks
Norm Hewitt	Hawkes Bay	1991-96	Māori All Blacks, All Blacks
Graham Hurunui	Horowhenua Kapiti	1993-95	Manawatu, Wellington, North Island, NZ XV, All Black trialist
Warren Johnston	Northland	1995	Chiefs, Maori All Blacks, NZ Colts
George Konia	Manawatu	1989-96	Hurricanes, North Island, NZ Colts, NZ XV, All Black Trialist, Japan
Tala Leiasamaivao	Wanganui	1991	Manu Samoa
Adrian McKenzie	Manawatu	1989-91	Wellington, Otago, NZ Colts, NZ Universities
Robbie McLean	Wairarapa Bush	1988-90	All Blacks
Justin Marshall	Southland	1993	All Blacks
Chris Masoe	Wanganui	2000	All Blacks
Glyn Meads	King Country	1988-92	NZ Emerging Players, All Black trialist
Mana Otai	Manawatu	1991-92	Tonga
Junior Paramore	Counties	1993	Manu Samoa
Roger Randle	Hawkes Bay	1996	All Blacks
Scott Robertson	Bay Of Plenty	1996	Played for and coached Canterbury, Crusaders, All Blacks
Kevin Schuler	Manawatu	1989-91	All Blacks
Dallas Seymour	Hawkes Bay	1996	All Blacks, NZ Sevens
Mark Shaw	Hawkes Bay	1988(c)	Manawatu, All Blacks
Gordon Slater	Taranaki	1993	Hurricanes, All Blacks
Lee Stensness	Manawatu	1992	All Blacks
Glenn Taylor	North Auckland/Northland	1993-96	All Blacks
Tony Thorpe	Poverty Bay	1989-90	All Black Reserve (1986), Canterbury, NZ Juniors, NZ Emerging Players
Jeff Wilson	Southland	1993	Otago, Highlanders, All Blacks

== Recent Squads ==
- 2019
- 2021
- 2022
- 2023
- 2024

Player	Province	Forward/Back	Year(s)
Anthony Amato	South Canterbury		2024
Connor Anderson	South Canterbury	Forward	2023
Shayne Anderson	West Coast	Back	2023
Matty Axtens	Thames Valley		2024
Sam Briggs	South Canterbury	Back	2023
Henry Bryce	South Canterbury	Forward	2022
Sireli Buliruarua	South Canterbury	Back	2021
Callum Burrell	Mid Canterbury	Forward	2021*
Scott Cameron	Horowhenua Kapiti	Forward	2019
Carl Carmichael	King Country	Forward	2019
Craig Clare	Whanganui	Back	2019, 2021
Josh Clark	North Otago	Forward	2019, 2023
Quinn Collard	Thames Valley		2024
Ralph Darling	North Otago	Forward	2019
Stefan Destounis	Poverty Bay	Forward	2021
Todd Doolan	Thames Valley	Back	2022, 2024
Cruise Dunstar	South Canterbury	Forward	2022
Hika Elliot	South Canterbury	Forward	2024
Sione Etoni	Thames Valley		2024
Oneone Faafou	Thames Valley		2024
Tokomaata Fakatava	South Canterbury	Forward	2021-24
Junior Fakatoufifita	North Otago	Forward	2022, 2023
Paula Fifita	South Canterbury	Back	2021-24
Kaleb Foote	King Country	Forward	2022-24
Te Rangi Fraser	Ngāti Porou East Coast	Back	2021
Kristian Gent-Standen	King Country		2024
James Goodger	Wairarapa Bush	Forward	2019
Hone Haerewa	Ngāti Porou East Coast	Forward	2021
Campbell Hart	Whanganui	Forward	2019, 2021
James Higgins	Poverty Bay	Forward	2021
Douglas Horrocks	Whanganui	Forward	2023
Lindsay Horrocks	Whanganui	Back	2019, 2021-23
Sione Holani	West Coast	Back	2019
Poleka Itielu	Horowhenua-Kapiti		2024
Finlay Joyce	South Canterbury		2023-24
Siu Kakala	South Canterbury		2024
Tyler Kearns	West Coast	Forward	2023
Meli Kolinisau	North Otago	Forward	2019
Seta Koroitamana	Mid Canterbury	Forward	2019, 2021
Te Huia Kutia	Thames Valley	Forward	2021, 2024
Harry Lafituanai	Thames Valley	Back	2019, 2022
Aaron Lahmert	Horowhenua Kapiti	Back	2019
Josh Lane	Whanganui	Forward	2021*
James Lash	Buller	Back	2019
Kalavini Leatigaga	South Canterbury	Back	2019
Jeff Lepa	Buller	Forward	2019
Declan McCormack	Mid Canterbury		2024
Glen McIntrye	Thames Valley	Forward	2019
Connor McVerry	Thames Valley	Forward	2021,2022
Peceli Malanicagi	Whanganui		2024
Leopino Maupese	Buller		2023
Clarence Moli	South Canterbury		2024
Fletcher Morgan	Thames Valley		2023
Peni Nabainvalu	Wanganui	Back	2019
Willie Paiaaua	Horowhenua Kapiti	Back	2019
Sam Parkes	Ngāti Porou East Coast	Back	2021*
Brett Ranga	Thames Valley	Forward	2019 (Cpt)
Ethan Robinson	Whanganui		2024
Tyler Rogers Holden	Whanganui		2024
Liam Rowlands	King Country	Forward	2022
Cam Russell	South Canterbury	Forward	2022
Saimone Samate	North Otago	Back	2022
Manasa Bari Samo	Mid Canterbury	Forward	2021
Zac Saunders	South Canterbury	Back	2021*, 2022
Timoci Seruwalu	Horowhenua Kapiti / Whanganui	Back	2019, 2021, 2022
Nick Strachan	South Canterbury	Forward	2021, 2022
Sam Sturgess	North Otago	Forward	2021
Vaka Taelega	South Canterbury	Forward	2021, 2022, 2023
Keanu Taumata	Poverty Bay		2023
Troy Tauwhare	West Coast	Forward	2019
Hakarangi Tichborne	East Coast	Forward	2022
Hayden Todd	North Otago	Back	2021, 2022
Loni Toumohuni	South Canterbury	Forward	2021*
Lennix Tovo	Horowhenua Kapiti	Back	2021
Roman Tutauha	Whanganui	Forward	2022
Sam Van Der Valk	Thames Valley	Forward	2021
Raitube Vasurakuta	Mid Canterbury	Back	2021, 2024
Logan Wakefield	Wairarapa Bush		2024
Dane Whale	Whanganui	Back	2021*, 2022
Dallas Wiki	Horowhenua-Kapiti		2024
Adam Williamson	Mid Canterbrury	Forward	2022-24
William Wright	South Canterbury	Back	2019,2021-24

- Denotes non-travelling reserve player

== Coaches/management ==
=== Head coaches ===
- Barry Matthews: 2016 and 2017
- Mark Rutene 2019
- Nigel Walsh (South Canterbury) 2021-2024

=== Management team ===
- Coll Campbell (Poverty Bay), Team Doctor 2021-2022
- Aleni Feagaiga (Horowhenua-Kapiti), Observer Coach 2024
- Jason Hamlin (Whanganui), Assistant Coach 2021-22
- David Harrison (Thames Valley), Observer Coach 2024
- Tony Harrison (Mid Canterbury), Manager 2021
- Slade King (King Country), Trainer 2021-24
- Miah Nikora, Assistant Coach 2023-24
- Shay O’Gorman (Wairarapa-Bush), Assistant Manager 2022
- Geoff Thompson (South Canterbury), Physio 2021-24
- Thomas Zimmerman (Horowhenua-Kapiti), Manager 2022-24

== See also ==
- RFU Championship XV
- New Zealand national schoolboy rugby union team
- New Zealand national under-19 rugby union team
- New Zealand national under-20 rugby union team
- New Zealand national under-21 rugby union team
- Junior All Blacks
- Maori All Blacks
