= Ranfurly Shield 1990–1999 =

New Zealand rugby union trophy

Ranfurly Shield
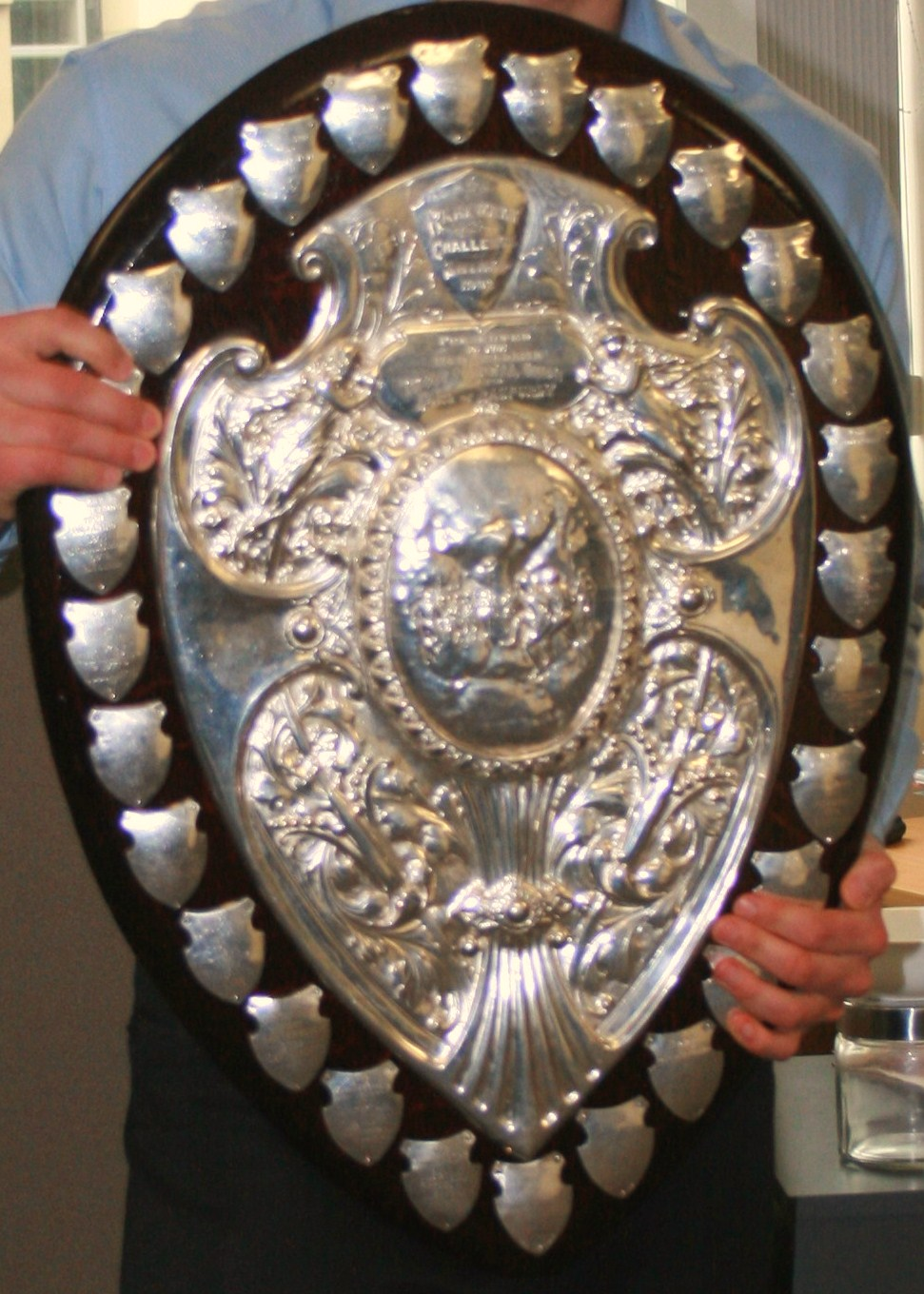
- Countries: New Zealand

Official website
- www.provincial.rugby/ranfurly-shield/

The Ranfurly Shield, colloquially known as the Log o' Wood, is perhaps the most prestigious trophy in New Zealand's domestic rugby union competition. First played for in 1904, the Ranfurly Shield is based on a challenge system, rather than a league or knockout competition as with most football trophies. The holding union must defend the Shield in challenge matches, and if a challenger defeats them, they become the new holder of the Shield.

Auckland began the decade as shield holders, before losing to Waikato in 1993 after a record 61 defences spanning from 1985. The shield changed hands seven times between four teams, ending up in Waikato's hands at the closing of the decade. Taranaki notably won the shield in 1996, holding it for only one successful defence. This was their fourth Ranfurly Shield stint, and their first since 1965.

== Fixtures ==
=== 1990 ===
29 May 1990	Auckland	58–3	King Country	Auckland

29 August 1990	Auckland	42–3	Poverty Bay	Gisborne

8 September 1990	Auckland	78–7	Southland	Auckland

15 September 1990	Auckland	45–9	Otago	Auckland

22 September 1990	Auckland	41–21	North Auckland	Auckland

29 September 1990	Auckland	18–9	North Harbour	Auckland

6 October 1990	Auckland	33–30	Canterbury	Auckland

=== 1991 ===
13 April 1991	Auckland	76–0	Nelson Bays	Nelson

1 June 1991	Auckland	29–18	Bay of Plenty	Auckland

27 July 1991	Auckland	27–0	Counties Manukau	Auckland

31 July 1991	Auckland	52–4	Manawatu	Auckland

31 August 1991	Auckland	55–9	Taranaki	Auckland

7 September 1991	Auckland	40–12	Waikato	Auckland

14 September 1991	Auckland	31–21	Wellington	Auckland

25 September 1991	Auckland	32–6	South Canterbury	Timaru

=== 1992 ===
12 August 1992	Auckland	55–3	Marlborough	Lansdowne Park, Blenheim
	Try: Shane Howarth (2); Toʻo Vaega; John Ngaumo (2); Jason Hewett; Mark Carter (3); Con: John Carter (5/9)		Pen: Craig Forsyth (1/1)	Attendance: 2,500; Referee: Terry Marshall (Canterbury)

22 August 1992	Auckland	21–16	Otago	Eden Park, Auckland
	Try: Terry Wright; Eroni Clarke; Mark Carter; Con: Grant Fox (0/3); Pen: Grant Fox (2/2)		Try: Paul Cooke; Con: Greg Cooper (1/1); Pen: Greg Cooper (3/3)	Attendance: 33,000; Referee: Alan Riley (Waikato)

29 August 1992	Auckland	40–9	Hawke's Bay	McLean Park, Napier
	Try: Shane Howarth; Terry Wright; Jason Hewett; Mark Carter; Con: Grant Fox (3/4); Pen: Grant Fox (2/2); Drop: Terry Wright (1/1)		Pen: Jarrod Cunningham (3/3)	Attendance: 13,000; Referee: Colin Hawke (South Canterbury)

1 September 1992	Auckland	42–15	King Country	Owen Delany Park, Taupō
	Try: Shane Howarth; Terry Wright; Eroni Clarke; John Kirwan; Con: Grant Fox (4/4); Pen: Grant Fox (2/2); Drop: Shane Howarth (1/1)		Pen: Phil Coffin (5/5)	Attendance: 8,000; Referee: Mike Fitzgibbon (Canterbury)

5 September 1992	Auckland	49–3	North Auckland	Eden Park, Auckland
	Try: Terry Wright (3); Robin Brooke (2); Shane Howarth; Con: Grant Fox (5/6); Pen: Grant Fox (3/3)		Pen: Warren Johnston (1/1)	Attendance: 11,000; Referee: Grant Lempriere (Manawatu)

12 September 1992	Auckland	47–38	Canterbury	Eden Park, Auckland
	Try: Shane Howarth; Sean Fitzpatrick; Jason Hewett; Grant Fox; Penalty try Con: Grant Fox (5/5); Pen: Grant Fox (4/4)		Try: Craig Philpott; Dion Kerr; Shayne Philpott; Wiremu Maunsell; Con: Greg Coffey (2/3); Graeme Bachop (1/1); Pen: Greg Coffey (4/4)	Attendance: 22,000; Referee: David Bishop (Southland)

15 September 1992	Auckland	24–19	Counties Manukau	Pukekohe Stadium, Pukekohe
	Try: Pat Lam; Penalty try Con: Grant Fox (1/2); Pen: Grant Fox (4/4)		Try: Luke Erenavula; Con: Dean Sheppard (1/1); Pen: Dean Sheppard (4/4)	Attendance: 10,000; Referee: Rod Hill (Wellington)

19 September 1992	Auckland	25–16	North Harbour	Eden Park, Auckland
	Try: John Kirwan; Con: Grant Fox (1/1); Pen: Grant Fox (6/6)		Try: Ant Strachan; Con: Walter Little (1/1); Pen: Walter Little (3/3)	Attendance: 43,000; Referee: Lindsay McLachlan (Otago)

=== 1993 ===
3 April 1993	Auckland	80–17	Horowhenua	Levin

6 April 1993	Auckland	48–3	Buller	Westport

5 June 1993	Auckland	69–31	Hawke's Bay	Auckland

1 September 1993	Auckland	139–5	North Otago	Oamaru

11 September 1993	Auckland	51–14	Wellington	Auckland

18 September 1993	Auckland	6–17	Waikato	Auckland

26 September 1993	Waikato	28–11	Otago	Hamilton

=== 1994 ===
6 June 1994	Waikato	74–3	Thames Valley	Hamilton

2 July 1994	Waikato	26–11	Manawatu	Hamilton

30 July 1994	Waikato	98–22	South Canterbury	Hamilton

13 August 1994	Waikato	45–10	King Country	Hamilton

3 September 1994	Waikato	26–29	Canterbury	Hamilton

18 September 1994	Canterbury	42–16	Counties Manukau	Christchurch

1 October 1994	Canterbury	22–20	Otago	Christchurch

=== 1995 ===
24 June 1995	Canterbury	64–19	Mid Canterbury	Ashburton

1 July 1995	Canterbury	43–17	Nelson Bays	Christchurch

15 July 1995	Canterbury	79–0	Marlborough	Christchurch

29 July 1995	Canterbury	72–17	South Canterbury	Christchurch

12 August 1995	Canterbury	27–22	Southland	Christchurch

19 August 1995	Canterbury	58–30	Waikato	Christchurch

10 September 1995	Canterbury	66–17	Wellington	Christchurch

23 September 1995	Canterbury	0–35	Auckland	Christchurch

1 October 1995	Auckland	26–17	Waikato	Auckland

=== 1996 ===
7 August 1996	Auckland	88–20	Poverty Bay	Gisborne

11 August 1996	Auckland	30–29	Bay of Plenty	Auckland

24 August 1996	Auckland	39–42	Taranaki	Auckland

31 August 1996	Taranaki	13–11	North Harbour	New Plymouth

8 September 1996	Taranaki	19–40	Waikato	New Plymouth

13 September 1996	Waikato	17–14	North Harbour	Hamilton

4 October 1996	Waikato	7–27	Auckland	Hamilton

12 October 1996	Auckland	69–27	North Harbour	Auckland

=== 1997 ===
22 July 1997	Auckland	115–6	East Coast	Ruatoria

23 August 1997	Auckland	47–14	Northland	Auckland

6 September 1997	Auckland	34–32	Southland	Auckland

13 September 1997	Auckland	27–12	Counties Manukau	Auckland

23 September 1997	Auckland	93–20	West Coast	Greymouth

4 October 1997	Auckland	29–31	Waikato	Auckland

=== 1998 ===
18 July 1998	Waikato	121–0	Poverty Bay	Hamilton

26 July 1998	Waikato	76–0	King Country	Hamilton

8 August 1998	Waikato	25–18	Bay of Plenty	Hamilton

15 August 1998	Waikato	24–23	Auckland	Hamilton

5 September 1998	Waikato	95–7	Southland	Hamilton

19 September 1998	Waikato	39–22	North Harbour	Hamilton

26 September 1998	Waikato	63–22	Northland	Hamilton

3 October 1998	Waikato	29–23	Canterbury	Hamilton

=== 1999 ===
24 July 1999	Waikato	74–6	Wairarapa Bush	Hamilton

28 July 1999	Waikato	37–8	Thames Valley	Hamilton

7 August 1999	Waikato	86–0	Hawke's Bay	Hamilton

21 August 1999	Waikato	27–11	Counties Manukau	Hamilton

4 September 1999	Waikato	33–15	Taranaki	Hamilton

18 September 1999	Waikato	30–24	Wellington	Hamilton

4 October 1999	Waikato	29–17	Otago	Hamilton
