= NZRFU Centenary Matches =

Celebration of Centenary in 1992

The New Zealand Rugby Football Union celebrated its centenary in 1992, which included New Zealand playing three tests against a World XV.

== World XV squad ==
Player	Date of birth	Position	Country
Naas Botha	27 February 1958	Fly-half	South Africa
Didier Camberabero	9 January 1961	Fly-half	France
Marc Cécillon	30 July 1959	Lock	France
Jannie Claassens	30 June 1969	Centre	South Africa
Troy Coker (Note: Joined the team for the final test only)	30 May 1965	Number eight	Australia
John Eales	27 June 1970	Lock	Australia
Nick Farr-Jones (c)	18 April 1962	Scrum-half	Australia
Peter Fatialofa	26 April 1959	Prop	Western Samoa
Peter FitzSimons	29 June 1961	Lock	Australia
Jeremy Guscott	7 July 1965	Centre	England
Gavin Hastings	3 January 1962	Fullback	Scotland
Pieter Hendriks	13 April 1970	Wing	South Africa
Tim Horan	18 May 1970	Fly-half	Australia
André Joubert	15 April 1964	Fullback	South Africa
Phil Kearns	27 June 1967	Hooker	Australia
Martin Knoetze	18 June 1963	Wing	South Africa
Jason Little	26 August 1970	Centre	Australia
Gord MacKinnon	27 August 1958	Flanker	Canada
Ewen McKenzie	21 June 1965	Prop	Australia
Federico Méndez	2 August 1972	Prop	Argentina
Brendan Nasser	6 June 1964	Flanker	Australia
Andy Nicol	12 March 1971	Scrum-half	Scotland
Viliami Ofahengaue	3 May 1968	Number eight	Australia
Apollo Perelini	16 July 1969	Flanker	Western Samoa
Olivier Roumat	16 June 1966	Lock	France
Uli Schmidt	10 July 1961	Hooker	South Africa
David Sole	8 May 1962	Prop	Scotland
Gary Whetton	15 December 1959	Lock	New Zealand
Derek White	30 January 1958	Flanker	Scotland
Yoshihito Yoshida	18 February 1969	Wing	Japan

== Matches ==
=== Tour match ===
15 April 1992

Hanan Shield Districts	3–74	World XV
Pen: Barry Fairbrother (1/1)		Try: André Joubert (3); Jeremy Guscott (2); Derek White (2); Pieter Hendriks (2); Marc Cécillon; Tim Horan; Viliami Ofahengaue; Andy Nicol; Con: Didier Camberabero (11/13)

Fraser Park, Timaru
Attendance: 6,500
Referee: Mike Fitzgibbon (Canterbury)

=== First Test ===
18 April 1992

New Zealand	14–28	World XV
Try: Va'aiga Tuigamala; Richard Turner; Con: Grant Fox (0/2); Pen: Grant Fox (2/2)		Try: Pieter Hendriks (2); Martin Knoetze; Con: Didier Camberabero (2); Gavin Hastings; Pen: Didier Camberabero

Lancaster Park, Christchurch
Attendance: 22,000
Referee: Derek Bevan (Wales)

=== Second Test ===
22 April 1992

New Zealand	54–26	World XV
Try: Greg Cooper (2); Eroni Clarke (2); Ant Strachan; Arran Pene; Blair Larsen; Richard Loe (2); Con: Greg Cooper (6/8); Grant Fox (1/1)		Try: Pieter Hendriks; Yoshihito Yoshida; Marc Cécillon; John Eales; Gavin Hastings; Con: Naas Botha (3/5); Cards: Olivier Roumat (red card)

Athletic Park, Wellington
Attendance: 25,000
Referee: David Bishop (New Zealand)

The World XV made four substitutions, exceeding the limit of three per match

=== Third Test ===
25 April 1992

New Zealand	26–15	World XV
Try: John Kirwan; Eroni Clarke; Arran Pene; Richard Loe; Con: Greg Cooper (2/4); Pen: Greg Cooper (2/3)		Try: Peter Fatialofa; Con: Naas Botha (1/1); Pen: Naas Botha (3/3)

Eden Park, Auckland
Attendance: 34,000
Referee: Derek Bevan (Wales)
