= Sam Doyle (disambiguation) =

Sam Doyle (1906–1985) was a Gullah folk artist.

Sam or Samuel Doyle may also refer to:

- Sam Doyle (musician), drummer with The Maccabees
- Sam Doyle (rugby union) (1970–2022), New Zealand rugby player
- Sam Doyle, character in Flight Lieutenant
- Samuel Doyle (politician) for 74th New York State Legislature
