= Bruce Hansen =

Bruce Hansen may refer to:

- Bruce Hansen (American football) (1961–2015), New England Patriots running back
- Bruce Hansen (equestrian) (1928–2002), New Zealand equestrian at the 1964 Summer Olympics
- Bruce Hansen (rugby union) (born 1964), New Zealand rugby union player
