= Tala Leiasamaivao =

Samoa international rugby union player

- Born: Talamasene Leasamaivao; 12 June 1967 (age 59) Sauago, Fagaloa, Samoa
- Height: 5 ft 11 in (1.80 m)
- Weight: 232 lb (105 kg)
- School: Wanganui High School

Rugby union career
- Position: Hooker
Amateur team(s)
Years	Team	Apps	(Points)
1988–1990	Wanganui High School Old Boys		
1991–1994	Avalon RFC		
Senior career
Years	Team	Apps	(Points)
1994–1996	Moata'a		
Provincial / State sides
Years	Team	Apps	(Points)
1988–1990	Wanganui	20	(8)
1991–1997	Wellington	27	(29)
Super Rugby
Years	Team	Apps	(Points)
1997–1998	Wellington Hurricanes	6	(0)
International career
Years	Team	Apps	(Points)
1988	New Zealand Colts	4	(1)
1991	New Zealand Divisional XV	2	(0)
1993–1997	Samoa	18	(5)

Talamasene "Tala" Leiasamaivao (born Fagaloa, 12 June 1967) is a Samoan rugby union player. He plays as a hooker.

== Career ==
=== Club career ===
His last international cap was during a match against Fiji, at Apia, on 5 July 1997. He played for the Hurricanes in the Super 14, but he had his career cut short in 1998 as a result of a serious neck injury. Leiasamaivao played three times off the bench for the Hurricanes in 1997 as an understudy to Norm Hewitt, and again made three appearances in 1998, again all as substitute appearances. He played for Wellington between 1991–1994 and 1996–1997, winning a total of 29 caps. He scored a try in his final NPC match for Wellington in a high scoring end of season 42–44 loss to Auckland. Leiasamaivao also played for New Zealand Divisional XV in 1991, with two caps. His career ended in 1998 due to a neck injury.

=== International career ===
He played internationals for Samoa for a number of years, with his first international cap during a match against Tonga at Nuku'alofa, on 29 May 1993. He lined up against the All Blacks in Auckland in 1993 and was part of the 1995 Rugby World Cup roster. He also made the New Zealand Colts early in his career and was an All Black trialist.

== After career ==
After his retirement, he worked as Pacific Island Liaison coordinator for the Ministry of Pacific Island Affairs for three years. He contested the 2005 general election for Destiny New Zealand in the Mana electorate.
