= Karl Williams (rugby union) =

- Born: Karl John Williams

Rugby union career
- Position: No. 8
Provincial / State sides
Years	Team	Apps	(Points)
1989-1997, 2000	Manawatu	85	(107)
1997	Central Vikings	6	(0)
1998-1999, 2000-2001	CA Périgueux		
Super Rugby
Years	Team	Apps	(Points)
1996-1998	Hurricanes	22	(10)

Karl John Williams is a former New Zealand professional rugby player.

== Biography ==
Williams played as a Number 8 for Manawatu for 8 seasons from 1989 to 2000. His most prolific season was in 1992 when he scored 43 points (9 tries). He had two seasons playing abroad in France for CA Périgueux. He played his final game in 2000 for Manawatu against Nelson Bays where he was sinbinned for a professional foul, for halting a quick tap kick.

He played three seasons for the Hurricanes from 1996 to 1998. He made his Super Rugby debut in March 1996 as an injury replacement for Bruce Hansen who had dislocated his sterno-clavicular joint. In his first game, which was against the Highlanders he scored a try from a five-metre scrum.

== Personal life ==
While in France he married a Frenchwoman, Catherine.
