= Dean Coleman (rugby union) =

New Zealand rugby union player

- Born: Dean Adrian Charles Coleman
- Height: 1.98 m (6 ft 6 in)

Rugby union career
- Position(s): Lock, Flanker
Provincial / State sides
Years	Team	Apps	(Points)
1991-1992	Manawatu	29	(5)
1993	King Country	16	(5)
1994-1995	Waikato	29	(20)
1996	Bay of Plenty	4	(0)
Super Rugby
Years	Team	Apps	(Points)
1996	Crusaders	8	(0)

Dean Adrian Charles Coleman is a former New Zealand professional rugby player.

== Biography ==
Coleman debuted in representative rugby playing as a lock for Manawatu for two seasons until 1992. He scored only one try for Manawatu which he scored during the 1992 National Provincial Championship. He later played for several other unions including King Country, Waikato and Bay of Plenty.

In 1996 he was signed to play for the Crusaders in the inaugural Super 12 season.

In 1997 he was not offered a Super Rugby contract, though would have been available anyway because of work commitments after becoming as Wrightson's Taranaki region finance manager in September 1996. He then signed to play for Taranaki, but did not play a match for them.

After retiring from professional rugby Coleman became the owner of a Mount Maunganui-based company Marexim which is a manufacturer and distributor of advanced lighting and electrical products.
