= Simon Forrest =

New Zealand rugby league and union footballer

- Born: Simon John Forrest; 2 August 1969 (age 56) New Zealand
- Height: 180 cm (5 ft 11 in)
- Weight: 189 lb (86 kg)
- University: University of Otago

Rugby union career
Senior career
Years	Team	Apps	(Points)
1996	Crusaders	4	(8)
1998-99	London Scottish	9	(10)
- Rugby league career

Playing information
Club
Years	Team	Pld	T	G	FG	P
1998–98	South Sydney	9	1	0	0	4

Simon John Forrest (born 2 August 1969) is a former rugby league and rugby union player who currently serves on the board of the Crusaders. He is the husband of Commonwealth Games medalist Anna Simcic.

== Playing career ==
=== Rugby Union ===
Forrest played two seasons for Southland as a back. In the 1992 National Provincial Championship he scored 13 tries. He scored 5 tries in one game against Poverty Bay. He played for the Crusaders in 1996, and for London Scottish F.C. from 1998 to 1999.

=== Rugby League ===
Forrest made his debut for the South Sydney Rabbitohs in the 1998 season, in their round 9 game against the North Sydney Bears.

== Post-playing career ==
Forrest served as co-coach of the New Zealand universities rugby union squad from 2014 to 2019.
