= St John's College, Hastings =

St. John's College

Location
- Hastings, Hawkes Bay; New Zealand; 39°38′22″S 176°51′22″E

Information
- Type: State Integrated, Single-sex, Day, Secondary (Year 9–13)
- Motto: Latin: Opere et Veritate; ("In Word and in Deed")
- Denomination: Catholic
- Established: 1941; 85 years ago
- Ministry of Education Institution no.: 226
- Principal: George Rogers
- Employees: ~ 35 (full time)
- Enrolment: 406 (July 2026)
- Colours: Maroon, blue and white
- Socio-economic decile: 4K
- Website: www.stjohns.school.nz

St. John's College is a State Integrated, Catholic, Day School for boys, located in Hastings, a provincial city in Hawkes Bay, New Zealand.

Founded in 1941 by the Marist Fathers, St. John's College has a non-selective enrolment policy (although it does give preference to students from Catholic families) and currently caters for approximately 450 students from Year 9 (3rd Form) to Year 13 (7th Form).

In 2006 its ethnic composition was Pākehā 73%, Māori 23%, and Pacific 4%. Academically, the school offers senior years the National Certificate of Educational Achievement assessment system (NCEA).

St. John's College is the oldest private/state integrated secondary for boys in New Zealand outside the traditional main centres of Auckland, Wellington, Christchurch, and Dunedin (Te Aute College, also in Hawke's Bay was previously the title holder but became coed during the 1990s).

== History ==
St John's College was established in 1941, on Frederick St, Hastings (the current site of St Mary's Primary School). It was founded by the Marist Fathers in response to the lack of Catholic education for young men in Hawkes Bay. It was also to be a brother school to the already established all girls Sacred Heart College, Napier, some 20 km north.

Enrolment proved so popular that the school needed to expand, so in 1956, with an allotment of donated land, St John's College moved to its present site on Jervois St, Mayfair. Old boys recall that on the day of the move, they carried the school furniture, back and forth to the new premises over 3 km away, and still had to attend afternoon class. The roll grew more slowly after that. Part of the problem was the transportation of students from around the Hawkes Bay region as many students from Napier found it difficult to reach school before school bus lines were established. There were even calls to make both Sacred Heart and St Johns co-ed, to prevent Napier boys travelling to Hastings and Hastings girls travelling to Napier. Today this issue is non-existent, although around 40% of St John's College students still come from the Napier area.

In 1975, St John's College was integrated into the state system under the Private Schools Conditional Integration Act 1975 "on a basis which will preserve and safeguard the special character of the education provided by them."

Over time St John's quietly expanded with the addition of new buildings and land. The 1990s saw drastic changes with the completion of 'The Centre' (the school gymnasium), the music suite and geography room, and the purchase of the old Firth industrial land to expand the playing fields. This gave St John's an additional rugby field, a new area for cricket nets, and another drive way towards Karamu road with additional car spaces. Since 2000 several remodels have been undertaken and includes the construction of the new technology wing.

St John's College celebrated its 50th Jubilee in 1991 which was the colleges biggest event ever. An abundance of old students returned for the weekend and included several speakers and functions as well as a variety of activities and inter house competitions for the students.

== Campus ==
St John's College is situated on Jervois St, Mayfair, in Hastings' northern suburbs. The site layout has all academic buildings close to the main road and are named after former rectors of the school, for example 'The Dowling Block' which contains the Library and Humanities subjects. Behind the buildings are the school playing fields, which separate the swimming pool and the tennis courts from the academic areas.

=== Facilities ===
Current facilities of St John's include:

- 'The Centre', which is a gymnasium used for sports, games and physical education (PE) classes. Also used as the venue for weekly Friday assemblies and other official school occasions such as college masses and the Year 13 Leavers' Mass.
- The Kenneth Guthrie Pool, located at the rear of the school property, next to the tennis courts.
- Playing Fields, which consist of a variety of interconnected fields containing two rugby fields, a cricket pitch and soccer field, with field hockey students practicing at the Mitre 10 Mega Sports Park in Hastings

== St John's tradition ==
=== Crest ===
The school crest incorporates four symbols. It incorporates the major elements of Archbishop Redwood's Crest: the star, the AM, and the "Redwood Cross" i.e. the cross on top of a pile of rocks. The five 5 pointed stars that sits on the upper left side represents the Virgin Mary. Originally it was a six-pointed star but was quickly corrected. The second is the cross that appears on the right side of the crest. It is the Calvary Cross, which represents the place where Jesus was crucified while also representing Christianity. Third directly below the star, is an A imposed over an M, a common symbol for Ave Maria, Latin for Hail Mary. The fourth is the Eagle situated across the top section of the shield, which represents St John. The Latin phrase "Opere et Veritate" or "In Word and In Deed" is the college's motto, represented in a banner stitched beneath the crest.

=== House system ===
The current house system was bought into the college in 1999, and was named after early Catholic missionaries who came to New Zealand. All except Redwood are French, and staff and students pronounce them in the traditional ways. The names and colours of the St John's College Houses are:

- Colin – green
- Forest – yellow
- Redwood – red
- Reignier – blue

== Curriculum ==
=== Academic results ===
The number of students achieving national qualifications is well above the national mean for similar decile schools at all levels of NCEA. The percentage of students obtaining NCEA Level 1 increased from 61% in 2003 to 66% in 2004. Levels of attainment in the literacy requirement have recently improved to the current level of over 91%. Achievement in university entrance results has steadily improved over the past three years and is above the national average for schools at this decile level. The percentage of Year 12 Māori students leaving school with qualifications is well above the national rates for schools in this decile. Retention of Māori students to complete their Year 12 studies is high.

== Historical abuse ==
Father Alan Woodcock SM sexually abused children at St John's College in Hastings, St Patrick's College in Upper Hutt, Highden in the Manawatu and Futuna in Wellington. After he left the Marist Priesthood and left New Zealand to live in England, he was extradited back to New Zealand and was convicted in 2004 of 21 sex offences committed against 11 children between 1978 and 1987 and sentenced to 7 years in prison. The abuse at St Pats Silverstream continued even after being reported to school rector Father Michael “Vince” Curtain and Marist order head Father Fred Bliss. Woodcock was moved to another Catholic institution in Palmerston North by Bliss where he continued to abuse children. Tracking him down abroad was done with the assistance of the Sisters of St Joseph of Nazareth. In the late 1980s, he took up residence in the England, where he was arrested in 2002

== Principals ==
- Paul Melloy (2014–2019)
- Rob Ferriera (2020 – April 2022)
- George Rogers (2022–present)

== Notable alumni ==
- Greg Cooper – former All Black
- Matt Cooper – former All Black
- Paddy Donovan (1936–2018) – amateur boxer and rugby union player
- Liam Dudding (born 1994) – cricketer
- Chris Eaton (rugby union) (born 1984) – professional rugby union footballer
- Greg Foran – Air New Zealand CEO, former president and CEO Walmart USA
- Peter Hayden MNZM (born 1948/49) – actor, and television series writer, producer and presenter
- Jonah Lowe (born 1996) – professional rugby union player
- Paul Martin (born 1967) – Roman Catholic Bishop of Christchurch (2018–2021); Coadjutor-Archbishop of Wellington (2021–present)
- Elijah Niko (born 1990) – professional rugby football player
- Dean Parker – Arts Foundation Laureate
- Brian Roche KNZM – business executive; Public Service Commissioner (2024–present)
- John Scott – architect
- Gerard Van Bohemen – Justice of the High Court of New Zealand, former Permanent Representative of New Zealand to the United Nations
- Michael Wintringham – State Services Commissioner (1997 to 2004)
- Eric Young – lead news anchor, Prime News, New Zealand
