= Timo Tagaloa =

NZ & Samoa international rugby union player

- Born: 17 October 1964 (age 62) Auckland, New Zealand
- Height: 5 ft 11 in (1.80 m)
- Weight: 201 lb (91 kg)

Rugby union career
- Position: Wing
Amateur team(s)
Years	Team	Apps	(Points)
1983-1984	Waitemata		
1990-1991	Marist St Pats		
1992-1993	North Shore		
Provincial / State sides
Years	Team	Apps	(Points)
1983-1984	Auckland	4	(12)
1984	Auckland B	1	(4)
1990-1991	Wellington	26	(64)
1992-1993	North Harbour	21	(46)
International career
Years	Team	Apps	(Points)
1983	New Zealand Colts	3	(4)
1990-1991	Samoa	37	(220)
1991-1992	New Zealand	6	(28)

Timo Danny Lawrence Tagaloa (born 17 October 1964 in Auckland) is a New Zealand-born Samoan rugby union player. He played as left winger. He played for Samoa national rugby union team and for the All Blacks.

== Career ==
=== Career start ===
Tagaloa began his rugby career in Auckland, playing for the amateur club Waitemata and the Auckland provincial team (first-grade and reserve teams). In 1983 he played several games for the youth team of New Zealand.

=== College football ===
In 1985, Timo Tagaloa moved to the United States and entered the Utah State University, playing for the university team in the college football championship. Team coach Chris Pell has named Tagaloa as one of the top 15-20 defenders in American college football. From 1985 to 1989, Tagaloa played 44 games, scoring 30 points thanks to 5 touchdowns, but abandoned the career of a professional NFL player.

=== Return to rugby ===
In 1990, Tagaloa returned to rugby, continuing his career with the Wellington Provincial team and playing for the Marist St Pats amateur club. He also played for the North Shore and North Harbour provincial team. In the 1990–1991 season, he was involved in the Samoa national team, in which Tagaloa debuted with Western Samoa in the match against Korea national rugby union team, on 8 April 1990, at Tokyo. He was part of the 1991 Rugby World Cup roster. During the World Cup, he scored 2 tries against Argentina. His last international match for Samoa was during the test match against Scotland on 19 October 1991, at Murrayfield. For Samoa, he scored 220 points in 37 matches (test and non-test). Later, he played for New Zealand and for the Al Blacks Sevens. According to his own words, due to the impossibility of getting into the All Blacks, Tagaloa was on the verge of suicide for some time, but stopped in time. Currently, he works for the Association "Athletes in Action", which is actively involved in psychological rehabilitation of athletes in difficult situations.
