= Jason Wright (rugby union) =

New Zealand rugby player (born 1969)

- Full name: Jason Anthony Wright
- Born: 5 July 1969 (age 57) Wellington, New Zealand
- Height: 6 ft 2 in (188 cm)
- Weight: 213 lb (97 kg)
- University: University of Otago; University of Cambridge

Rugby union career
- Position: Centre / Wing
Senior career
Years	Team	Apps	(Points)
1997–99	Richmond		
1999–00	Benetton Treviso		
2000–02	London Irish		
2002–03	Cambridge University		
Provincial / State sides
Years	Team	Apps	(Points)
1992–97	Otago	54	(123)
Super Rugby
Years	Team	Apps	(Points)
1996–97	Highlanders	4	(0)

Jason Anthony Wright (born 5 July 1969) is a New Zealand former professional rugby union player.

== Biography ==
Born in Wellington, Wright attended the University of Otago and was New Zealand Universities representative wing three-quarter in 1992. He played as a centre three-quarter and wing with Otago from 1992 to 1997, while making four Super 12 appearances for the Highlanders across 1996 and 1997.

Wright continued his career in the English Premiership in 1997 with Richmond, where he played until the 1999–00 season, which he spent at Italian club Benetton Treviso, before returning to England in 2000 and joining London Irish.

A two-time Cambridge blue, Wright featured in the 2002 and 2003 Varsity matches, for a win and a draw. He read Social and Political Sciences at the University of Cambridge.
