= Rhys Ellison =

- Born: Daniel Rhys Ellison; 6 March 1966 (age 60) Raglan, New Zealand
- Height: 1.80 m (5 ft 11 in)
- Weight: 94 kg (14 st 11 lb; 207 lb)
- School: Raglan Area School; Hamilton Boys' High School
- University: University of Otago; University of Waikato
- Notable relative: Thomas Ellison (Great-uncle)

Rugby union career
- Position: Wing
Senior career
Years	Team	Apps	(Points)
1985	Bay of Plenty	4	(19)
1986–89	Otago	60	(161)
1990–95	Waikato	90	(129)
1997–98	Munster	12	(11)
- Correct as of 29 April 2017
International career
Years	Team	Apps	(Points)
1986–94	Māori All Blacks	20+	(27)

Daniel Rhys Ellison (born 6 March 1966) is a former New Zealand rugby union player.

== Career ==
After playing for Otago while at university, Ellison debuted for the Mooloos in 1990. He played in 60 games for Otago, 90 games for Waikato, over 20 games for the Maori All Blacks and played in three All Blacks Trials. In 1993, with Waikato, Ellison helped to beat the touring British and Irish Lions and to win the Ranfurly Shield. After a year in Japan, he joined Irish club side Munster, playing for them and Shannon RFC from 1997 until 2000.

== Outside of rugby ==
Ellison graduated with a law degree in and was admitted to the bar in 1994. He is qualified to practice law in both New Zealand and Ireland and is a member of the New Zealand Law Society, Auckland District Law Society, The Irish Law society, the Zealand Society of Notary Publics and the World Society of Notary Publics. He is now the Principal of Rhys Ellison Law.

== Family ==
Thomas Ellison is Rhys' great-uncle. Thomas was the first Maori to graduate from a NZ University with a law degree and the first All Black Captain. While in Ireland, Rhys met his wife, Karen, and they have two sons; Jake and Tristan. They now live in New Zealand.
