= Mana Otai =

Tonga international rugby union player

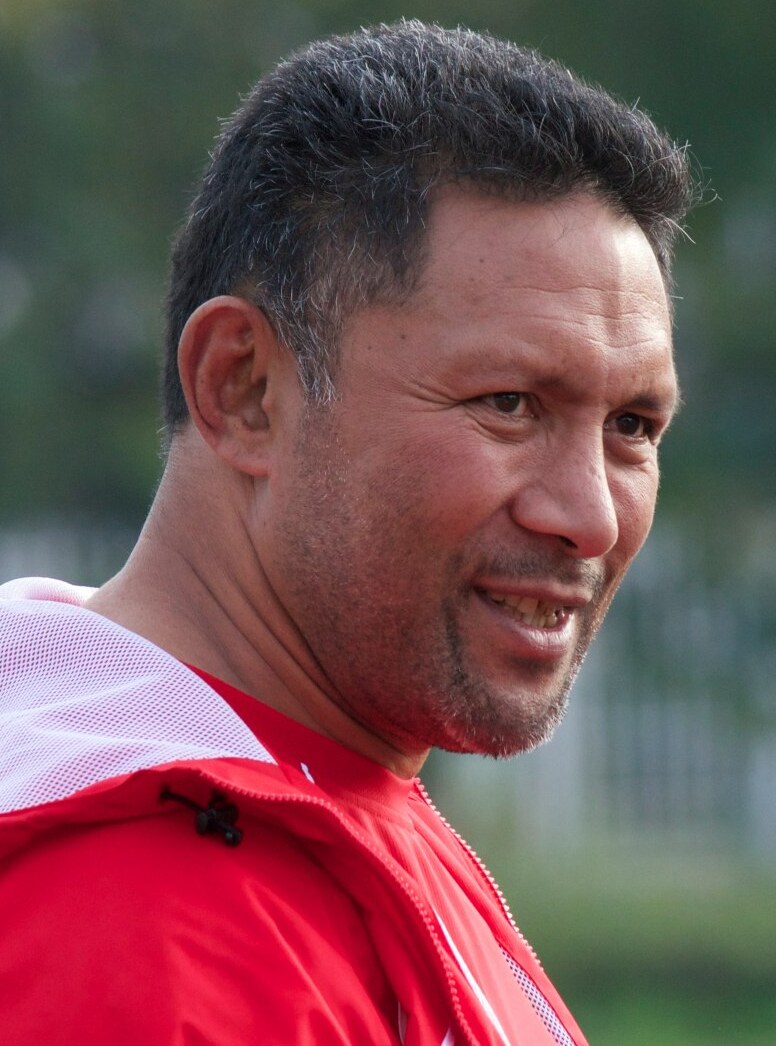
- Mana Otai in 2012
- Born: Kolo-Ki-Lakepa Manakaetau Filipe 'Otai; 21 September 1968 (age 58)

Rugby union career
- Position: Flanker
Amateur team(s)
Years	Team	Apps	(Points)
1988-1994	Massey University		
1996	Kia Toa RFC		
1999	Marist Brothers Old Boys RFC		
Provincial / State sides
Years	Team	Apps	(Points)
1988-1994	Manawatu		
1996	North Harbour		
1999	Auckland St Patricks College Wellington 1st 15 1986		
International career
Years	Team	Apps	(Points)
1988	New Zealand U-21	1	(0)
1991-1993	New Zealand Divisional Team	15	(34)
1995	Tonga	5	(5)
Coaching career
- Years: Team
- 2009–2012: Auckland RFU
- 2012-2015: Tonga
- 2017-: Poverty Bay

K. Manakaetau F. 'Otai (born 21 September 1968) is coach of the Tonga national team (ʻIkale Tahi (Sea Eagles)). He was educated at St Peter's College, Auckland and played club rugby in Auckland. His playing position was as flanker (No 8). Otai represented Tonga, being capped for the first time on 11 February 1995 against Japan at Nagoya. Otai was the Tongan team captain in the 1995 Rugby World Cup competition, in which he scored a try. Otai was an All Black trialist in 1994.

== Coaching career ==
In September 2012, Otai was named head coach of the Tonga national team, taking over from Toutai Kefu, who was acting head coach for the ʻIkale Tahi at the time. His two-year contract would see Otai through to 3 September 2014, and a possible re-sign is allowed based on his performance until then.

Otai's first match in charge was a 28–23 loss to Italy during Tonga's 2012 European tour. His first win came a week later, a 22–13 win against the United States, which was backed up by a first-ever victory for Tonga over Scotland, running out 21–15 victors. His maiden IRB Pacific Nations Cup ended with Tonga finishing third with two wins from four; a 27–17 win over Japan and an 18–9 win over the United States. However, Tonga's final game in the 2013 IRB Pacific Nations Cup (a 34–21 loss to Fiji), started a six consecutive streak without a win. This included a winless 2013 European tour, consisting of a loss on a first-ever meeting against Romania, and back-to-back losses to Tier 1 nations France and Wales. An 18-all draw against Samoa and another loss to Fiji in the 2014 IRB Pacific Nations Cup saw them finish last in their conference, before Otai earned a win - 36–14, in an uncapped match against the Pacific Barbarians.

In August 2014, it was announced that the Tonga Rugby Union would not be re-signing his two-year contract, despite it being reported that Otai had been working hard to finalize players that would be available to play for the Tonga on their 2014 European Tour in November, and the 2015 Rugby World Cup. However, on 24 September 2014, following negotiations between the International Rugby Board and the Tonga Rugby Union, it was announced that Mana Otai would remain as head coach for Tonga's 2014 European Tour with another chance to redeem himself on the tour, which included matches against Georgia, the United States and Scotland. Ahead of their tour, Mana Otai brought in former South African World Cup-winning coach, Jake White, to his coaching set-up, to act as a technical advisor to Mana.

White and Otai led Tonga to 2 from 3 wins during their 2014 European Tour. The Tonga Rugby Union were encouraged by the tour, re-signing Mana Otai contract to see him through to the end of the 2015 Rugby World Cup.

During the 2015 World Rugby Pacific Nations Cup, Tonga finished third at the end of the tournament. They opened with a match against Fiji in Suva, losing 30–22, before going onto beat Canada 28–18 and the United States 33–19. They beat Japan 31–20 in the 3rd Place play-off to claim third place. Otai later led Tonga to two victories in their 2015 Rugby World Cup warm-up matches, beating English club side Nottingham 69–14, before beating Romania for the first ever time in Bucharest 21–16. During the 2015 Rugby World Cup, Tonga opened their campaign with a surprise 17–10 loss to Georgia, before picking up their first win against Namibia 35–21. They went on to lose to New Zealand and Argentina 45–10 and 45–16, to finish fourth in the pool. This meant Tonga failed to automatically qualify for the 2019 Rugby World Cup.

On 17 December 2015, Tonga Rugby Union president Feʻao Vunipola announced that the TRU would not extend Otai's contract when it expires at the end of 2015, with Otai's match against the All Blacks being his last in charge of the team.

== See also ==
- Tonga national rugby union team
- List of people educated at St Peter's College, Auckland

Sporting positions
Preceded by (Australia) Toutai Kefu (caretaker)	Tonga National Rugby Union Coach; 2012-2015	Succeeded by (Australia) Toutai Kefu
