= Paula Bale =

- Born: 27 December 1965 (age 60) Levuka, Fiji
- Height: 6 ft 1 in (185 cm)
- Weight: 206 lb (93 kg)

Rugby union career
- Position: Centre / Wing
Provincial / State sides
Years	Team	Apps	(Points)
1989–96	Canterbury	102	(429)
1997	Mid Canterbury	3	(0)
Super Rugby
Years	Team	Apps	(Points)
1996–97	Crusaders	13	(5)
International career
Years	Team	Apps	(Points)
1995	Fiji	5	(5)

Paula Bale (born 27 December 1965) is a Fijian former rugby union international.

Born in Levuka, Fiji, Bale was a New Zealand-based three-quarter. He trialled for the All Blacks and represented New Zealand in rugby sevens, before making the Fiji national side for five Test matches in 1995.

Bale played provincial rugby with Canterbury and was the top try scorer in the 1989 National Provincial Championship season. He made 93 total tries in 102 appearances for Canterbury and had two Super 12 seasons with the Crusaders.

== See also ==
- List of Fiji national rugby union players
