= Greg Smith (rugby union, born 1968) =

Japan international rugby union player

- Born: Gregory Robert Smith; July 16, 1968 (age 58) Fiji
- Height: 6 ft 2 in (1.88 m)
- Weight: 231 lb (105 kg; 16.5 st)

Rugby union career
- Position: Flanker
Amateur team(s)
Years	Team	Apps	(Points)
1992-1995	Burnside		
Senior career
Years	Team	Apps	(Points)
1996-1999	Toyota Motors		
Provincial / State sides
Years	Team	Apps	(Points)
1992-1995	Canterbury	30	(40)
International career
Years	Team	Apps	(Points)
1998-1999	Japan	17	(15)

Gregory Robert Smith (born 16 July 1968) is a Fijian former rugby union player. He played for Japan as flanker.

== Career ==
Smith first played for Japan on 3 May 1998, against Canada at the Chichibunomiya Rugby Stadium. He was present in the 1999 Rugby World Cup roster, where he played all the 3 matches in the tournament, against Samoa, Wales and Argentina, at the Millennium Stadium, Cardiff, on 16 October, which would be his last international cap. Throughout all his career, Smith earned 17 caps, 15 points and 3 tries scored. At club level, he played for Canterbury in the NPC and then, he moved in Japan to play for the Toyota Motors club.
