= Richard Jarman (rugby union) =

- Full name: Richard Arthur Jarman
- Born: 29 January 1972 (age 54)
- Occupation: Police officer

Rugby union career
- Position: Halfback
Provincial / State sides
Years	Team	Apps	(Points)
1992–00	Taranaki	82	(100)
2001–02	Manawatu	13	(5)
Super Rugby
Years	Team	Apps	(Points)
1997–98	Hurricanes	7	(0)

Richard Arthur Jarman (born 29 January 1972) is a New Zealand former professional rugby union player.

Jarman represented New Zealand at under-17s and under-19s level.

A halfback, Jarman was a fixture in the Taranaki side throughout most of the 1990s and scored their only try when they defended the Ranfurly Shield in 1996 with a 13–11 win over North Harbour. He served as back up to Jon Preston during the Hurricanes' 1997 and 1998 Super 12 campaigns, making seven appearances. At the back end of his career, Jarman had a stint in England with Worcester and captained Manawatu in provincial rugby.

Jarman is now a Senior Constable with New Zealand Police.
