= Afagaloa =

Village in Samoa

Coordinates: 13°45′S 172°31′W

Afagaloa is a village on the island of Savai'i in Samoa. It is situated on the south coast of the island in the electoral constituency (faipule district) of Palauli West which is part of the larger political district of Palauli.
