= Shane McDonald (rugby union) =

- Full name: Shane Richard McDonald
- Born: 21 June 1971 (age 55) Stratford, New Zealand
- Height: 5 ft 11 in (180 cm)
- Weight: 240 lb (109 kg)
- School: Saint Patrick's Silverstream
- Occupation: Cattle farmer

Rugby union career
- Position: Hooker
Provincial / State sides
Years	Team	Apps	(Points)
1991–00	Taranaki	116	(90)
Super Rugby
Years	Team	Apps	(Points)
1998	Blues	2	(0)

Shane Richard McDonald (born 21 June 1971) is a New Zealand former professional rugby union player.

== Rugby career ==
Born in Stratford, McDonald was the primary Taranaki hooker of the 1990s, making 116 appearances. He played twice for the Blues during the 1998 Super 12 season. Heading off to Europe in 1998, McDonald had a season with West Hartlepool, before joining Irish team Connacht. He was capped for Ireland "A" during his time with Connacht.

McDonald served as Taranaki manager from 2010 to 2013 and has coached his hometown club Stratford.
