= David Hunter (New Zealand cricketer) =

New Zealand cricketer (born 1968)

Personal information
- Full name: David Jeremy Hunter
- Born: 5 December 1968 (age 57); Mosgiel, Otago, New Zealand
- Batting: Right-handed
- Bowling: Right-arm fast-medium

Domestic team information
- Years: Team
- 1989/90–1991/92: Otago
- Source: ESPNcricinfo, 14 May 2016

David Jeremy Hunter (born 5 December 1968) is a New Zealand cricketer, teacher, and cricket administrator.

Hunter was a pace bowler who took 43 wickets in 16 first-class matches for Otago between 1989 and 1992. His best first-class figures were 4 for 35 in Otago's victory over Auckland in the 1989–90 Shell Trophy.

He also played representative rugby for South Canterbury. He played four seasons as fullback in the National Provincial Championship between 1992 and 1995. A goal kicker, in 49 games he scored 206 points.

A former pupil of Taieri College in Mosgiel, Hunter has been the Principal of Taieri College since August 2013. He was previously Deputy Principal of Roxburgh Area School in Central Otago and Principal of Maniototo Area School in Ranfurly, also in Central Otago.

In August 2026, Hunter was appointed chief executive of the Otago Cricket Association, to begin his duties in November 2026.
