= Simon Mannix =

New Zealand international rugby union player

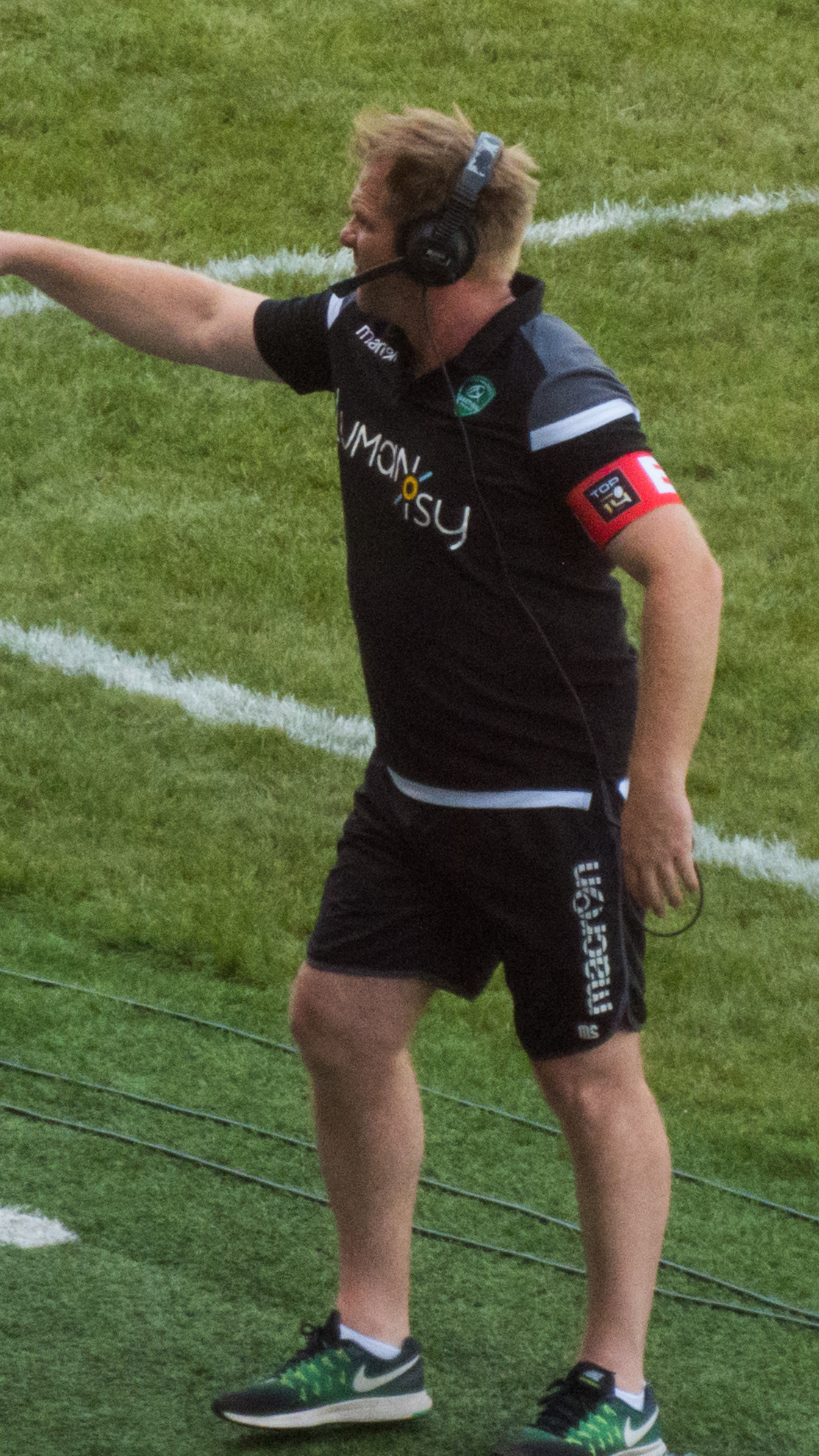
- Simon Mannix
- Born: Simon James Mannix; 10 August 1971 (age 55) Lower Hutt, New Zealand
- Height: 6 ft 3 in (1.91 m)
- Weight: 184 lb (83 kg)
- School: St. Patrick's College, Silverstream

Rugby union career
- Position: Fly-half
Senior career
Years	Team	Apps	(Points)
1990–96	Wellington Lions	83	(648)
1996	Wellington Hurricanes	5	(6)
1997–98	Sale Sharks	10	(48)
1998–2001	Gloucester	53	(540)
International career
Years	Team	Apps	(Points)
1994	New Zealand	1	(0)
Coaching career
- Years: Team
- 2007–11: Racing 92
- 2012–14: Munster
- 2014–2019: Pau
- 2019–2021: Singapore
- 2023-2024: Biarritz Olympique
- 2024–: Portugal

Simon James Mannix (born 10 August 1971 in Lower Hutt, New Zealand) is a former rugby union footballer. He served as head coach of Biarritz Olympique in the French second division D2, having previously worked at Pau and as a backs coach for Munster and Racing Metro. Mannix played one test for the New Zealand national rugby union team against France in 1994. He was educated at St Patrick's College, Silverstream.

== Playing career ==
Mannix played for Wellington, and Wellington Hurricanes in his native New Zealand. Later in his playing career, he moved to Europe and played for Sale Sharks, Gloucester Rugby and Racing Métro 92. He made eight appearances, including one test match, for New Zealand between 1990 and 1994.

== Coaching ==
Mannix was backs coach for Racing Metro from 2006 until December 2011, when he was dismissed. He was part of the management team that gained the club promotion to the Top 14 in 2009. In 2012, Mannix was appointed backs coach of Munster on a two-year contract from the 2012–13 season under head coach Rob Penney. He was appointed head coach of Pau, then in the Pro D2, for the start of the 2014–2015 season. He went on to top the Pro D2 in his first season, earning the team promotion to the top 14. In 2019, Mannix was appointed coach of the Singapore rugby team on a three-year contract. He resigned in 2021. Mannix has been coach of the Portugal national rugby union team, the Wolves, since 2024, and got the qualification for 2027 World Cup in Australia.
