= Danny Love =

- Born: Daniel Andrew Ngatata Love

Rugby union career
- Position(s): Halfback, Fullback
Provincial / State sides
Years	Team	Apps	(Points)
1990-1992	Manawatu	14	(138)
1993-1996	Counties	54	(698)
Super Rugby
Years	Team	Apps	(Points)
1996	Crusaders	1	(0)
International career
Years	Team	Apps	(Points)
1995	NZ Maori	2	(29)

Daniel Andrew Ngatata Love is a former New Zealand professional rugby union player.

== Biography ==
Love played as a halfback for Manawatu for three seasons until 1992. He then shifted teams to play for Counties. He was in the Counties team which won promotion to the first division in 1993. In just four seasons Love scored a record 698 points for the union.

In 1995 Love played two matches for the New Zealand Maori team. He was picked for New Zealand Maori's three-match tour of Tonga and Fiji in 1996, but was unable to join the tour because of an injury.
