= Paul Cooke (rugby union, born 1967) =

New Zealand rugby player

Paul James Cooke (born 9 January 1967) is a former New Zealand rugby player who played on the left wing and amassed 107 games and 72 tries for Otago. Described as a "superb finisher", his 134 tries in 192 first class games is considered an excellent strike rate.

Known as "Cookie", Paul Cooke played 51 games for Hawkes Bay between 1985 and 1989 scoring 180 points. He also played for the New Zealand Colts in 1986 and 1987 scoring 4 tries. He moved to Otago in 1990 and played for Otago until 1996. He also played 9 games for the Highlanders in the 1996 season.

In 1991 Paul Cooke played 14 games for Otago scoring 6 tries when they won the first division championship. He played in Otago's victory over the British and Irish Lions in 1993, scoring two tries in the 37-24 final scoreline. He holds the Otago record jointly (with John Timu and Brendan Laney) for most tries in a season when scored 16 tries in 1995.

Paul Cooke played in six Ranfurly Shield Challenges (four for Otago and two for Hawke's Bay) but was never on the winning team. He played for the New Zealand Maori team between 1991 and 1996.
