= Kerry Eynon =

New Zealand rugby player (born 1971)

- Born: Kerry Wayne Eynon; 17 December 1971 (age 54) Kaponga, Taranaki, New Zealand

Rugby union career
- Position(s): Centre, Second Five-Eight, Flyhalf
Provincial / State sides
Years	Team	Apps	(Points)
1991-2000	Taranaki	104	(94)
2001	Manawatu	7	(0)
Coaching career
- Years: Team
- 2022–2024: Taranaki Whio

Kerry Wayne Eynon (born 17 December 1971) is a former New Zealand professional rugby player.

== Biography ==
Eynon played as a utility back for Taranaki for ten seasons from 1991 to 2000. He was part of the Taranaki squad that won the second division NPC final to secure promotion to the first division in 1992. During the 2000 season he played his 100th game for Taranaki. For the 2001 season he played for Manawatu as a loan player.

He switched codes in 2002 to play rugby league for the Taranaki Wildcats, debuting in 2002.

In 2022, Eynon was named the coach of the Taranaki Whio squad in the Farah Palmer Cup.
