= Mark Carter (rugby) =

NZ international rugby union & league player

- Born: Mark Peter Carter; 7 November 1968 (age 58) Auckland, New Zealand
- Height: 1.88 m (6 ft 2 in)
- Weight: 100 kg (15 st 10 lb)
- School: Liston College

Rugby union career
- Position: Openside flanker
- Current team: Retired
Amateur team(s)
Years	Team	Apps	(Points)
- Auckland Suburbs
Provincial / State sides
Years	Team	Apps	(Points)
1990-1996	Auckland		
1996-98	Blues		
International career
Years	Team	Apps	(Points)
1991–98	New Zealand	10	(5)
- Rugby league career

Playing information
- Position: Second-row
Club
Years	Team	Pld	T	G	FG	P
1996	Auckland Warriors	8				0

Mark Carter is a former rugby football footballer. He represented Auckland in both rugby union and rugby league and represented New Zealand in rugby union. He has a street named after him in South Auckland.

== Early life ==
Carter attended Liston College in Henderson, West Auckland.

== Rugby Union ==
He played in the 1991 Rugby World Cup. He became the first forward for the Auckland Blues to score three tries in a Super Rugby match, which he did in 1998 while playing the Stormers.
