= Matthew Cooper (rugby union) =

NZ & Croatia international rugby union player

Matthew Cooper MNZM
- Born: Matthew James Andrew Cooper; 10 October 1966 (age 60) Gisborne, New Zealand
- Height: 1.88 m (6 ft 2 in)
- Weight: 90 kg (200 lb)
- School: St John's College, Hastings
- Notable relative: Greg Cooper (brother)
- Occupation(s): CEO of Sport Waikato; Television rugby commentator

Rugby union career
- Position(s): Second five-eighth Fullback
Provincial / State sides
Years	Team	Apps	(Points)
1985–88	Hawke's Bay		
1989–99	Waikato	124	(1604)
Super Rugby
Years	Team	Apps	(Points)
1996	Highlanders		
1997–99	Chiefs		
International career
Years	Team	Apps	(Points)
1987, 92–94, 96	New Zealand	8	(55)
1998	Croatia	1	(24)

Matthew James Andrew Cooper MNZM (born 10 October 1966) is a former New Zealand international rugby union player. He made his All Black test debut against Ireland on 6 June 1992, setting a then-world record of 23 points on test debut, with the last of his eight caps coming on 3 July 1994 against France.

Born in Gisborne on 10 October 1966, Cooper was educated at Napier Marist Brothers and St John's College Schools where he was a member of the 1st XV from 1982 to 1984. In 1984 he played for New Zealand secondary schools against Australia then toured with the team to Britain. He made his Hawke's Bay debut in 1985 as an 18-year-old.

Chosen to play for the Otago Highlanders in the inaugural Super 12 series in 1996, Cooper soon proved his value with a couple of match-winning performances and that form saw him called up for the All Black tour to South Africa. On his return, Cooper topped 1000 points for Waikato. He continued to represent Waikato until 1999 and with 1604 points holds the union's scoring record. He also appeared for Waikato Chiefs 1997–99.

== International career ==
Cooper had already played for the All Blacks in a 'B' international on the tour to Japan in 1987 after some outstanding performances for Hawke's Bay, but he saw Waikato as providing the first division base on which he could further establish his game. Soon after linking up with the Hamilton Marist club he was in the Waikato squad where he played both at centre and at fullback and became goalkicker.

His solid performances and points scoring efforts for Waikato kept him to the forefront and eventually he was given his chance at international level against Ireland at Athletic Park, Wellington in 1992. His 23 points in his debut test was a record and on the strength of that showing he was chosen for the All Black tour to Australia and South Africa that same year.

He played against the British Lions in New Zealand in 1993 and went to Scotland and England later that year where he became firmly established in the All Black midfield and took over the goalkicking role with great success. However, injury ruled him out of the test against England. He returned to play two tests against France in 1994. After retirement, he became the CEO of Sport Waikato and in 2005 became a Member of the New Zealand Order of Merit.

His elder brother Greg, a fullback, was an All Black in 1986 and 1992, winning seven caps. The brothers are of partial Croatian descent. Before the one country rule for qualifying came into effect for international rugby, Matthew Cooper took advantage of his dual qualification and represented Croatia against Italy in their 1999 Rugby World Cup qualification campaign, during New Zealand-born Anthony Sumic's reign as Croatian coach.

In the 2006 New Year Honours, Cooper was appointed a Member of the New Zealand Order of Merit, for services to rugby and sports administration.
