= Mark Cooksley =

- Born: Mark Stephen "Rigga" Bill Cooksley; 11 April 1971 (age 55) Auckland, New Zealand
- Height: 2.05 m (6 ft 9 in)
- Weight: 125 kg (19 st 10 lb)
- School: Manurewa High School

Rugby union career
- Position: Lock
Provincial / State sides
Years	Team	Apps	(Points)
1990–1993	Counties Manukau	36	
1994–2001	Waikato	75	
Super Rugby
Years	Team	Apps	(Points)
1996, 1998, 2000–2001	Chiefs		
1997	Hurricanes		
International career
Years	Team	Apps	(Points)
1992–	NZ Māori		
1992–1995, 1997, 2001	New Zealand	11	(0)

Mark Stephen Bill Cooksley (born 11 April 1971 in Auckland, New Zealand) is a former professional rugby union player and All Black lock.

Cooksley was the tallest All Black ever at 2.05 metres and 125 kg, until this was surpassed by Dominic Bird (2.08 metres), who made his test debut for the All Blacks in 2013. He had a long All Black career, spanning from 1992 until 2001. Despite this, Cooksley only played in 23 All Black matches, and only 11 All Black tests. This could be attributed to many injuries he sustained during his career, as well as Robin Brooke and Ian Jones often being the favoured locking pair during this time.

A descendant of Ngāpuhi, he regularly played for New Zealand Māori throughout his career, from 1992 up until 2001, when he featured in the match against the Wallabies.

In 1995, Cooksley gained another distinction when he was a replacement on the end of year tour of France; in his one appearance on tour he became the first All Black to be shown a yellow card, with Irish referee Gordon Black apparently unaware that the red and yellow card system did not then apply to international rugby.

In 1997, having been out of the All Black side since the 1995 tour of France, Cooksley was drafted into the Wellington Hurricanes for the Super 12. Cooksley consistently played well that season, helping the Hurricanes to reach the semi-finals, and he was rewarded with an All Black recall for the end of year tour to Britain and Ireland, although he only featured in the mid-week matches.

In 2000, it appeared that his rugby career was over as he struggled to make the Waikato NPC side. However, he was selected for the Chiefs side for the Super 12 in 2001, and earned an All Black recall that year, where he played in two Tri-Nations matches. A serious back injury forced Cooksley to retire at the end of that year.

Cooksley now works as General Manager for the Central North Island branch of Directionz in Hamilton. He has also been involved in coaching rugby at club level.
