= Marty Berry =

New Zealand rugby player (born 1966)

- Born: Martin Joseph Berry; 13 July 1966 (age 60) Wellington, New Zealand
- Height: 1.88 m (6 ft 2 in)
- Weight: 85 kg (187 lb)
- School: Chanel College
- Notable relative: Rocco Berry (son)

Rugby union career
- Position: Utility back
Senior career
Years	Team	Apps	(Points)
1997–2000	Petrarca Rugby		
Provincial / State sides
Years	Team	Apps	(Points)
1985–88, 91–92, 95	Wairarapa Bush		
1988	Transvaal	1	
1989–90, 93–94	Wellington		
1996	Manawatu		
Super Rugby
Years	Team	Apps	(Points)
1996	Hurricanes	7	(17)
International career
Years	Team	Apps	(Points)
1986, 1993	New Zealand	10	(9)

Martin Joseph Berry (born 13 July 1966) is a former New Zealand rugby union player. A utility back, Berry represented Wairarapa Bush, Wellington and Manawatu at a provincial level, and the Hurricanes in Super Rugby. Following a successful spell playing with Glasgow Academicals in Scotland, he was a member of the New Zealand national side, the All Blacks, in 1986 and 1993, playing 10 matches, including a single test match appearance as a substitute. He is the father of Rocco Berry, a rugby league player for the New Zealand Warriors.
