= Shane Howarth =

NZ & Wales international rugby union & league player

- Born: Shane Paul Howarth; 8 July 1968 (age 58) Auckland, New Zealand
- Height: 1.72 m (5 ft 7 1/2 in)
- Weight: 82 kg (12 st 13 lb)
- Notable relative(s): Calvin Howarth, brother

Rugby union career
- Position: Fullback
Senior career
| Years | Team | Apps | (Points) |
| 1997-1999 | Sale | | |
| 1999–2003 | Newport | 108 | (1035) |
Provincial / State sides
| Years | Team | Apps | (Points) |
| 1990–1995 | Auckland | 62 | |
- Correct as of 2008-05-26
International career
| Years | Team | Apps | (Points) |
| 1994 | New Zealand | 4 | (54) |
| 1998–2000 | Wales | 19 | (23) |
- Correct as of 2008-05-26
Coaching career
- Years: Team
- 2006: Pacific Islanders (assistant)
- 2004–2010: Auckland (assistant)
- 2013: Worcester Warriors (backs coach)
- Correct as of 2008-05-26
- Rugby league career

Playing information
- Position: Fullback
Club
| Years | Team | Pld | T | G | FG | P |
|---|---|---|---|---|---|---|
| 1996 | North Queensland Cowboys | 12 | | | | 49 |
Representative
| Years | Team | Pld | T | G | FG | P |
| | New Zealand |

Shane Paul Howarth (born 8 July 1968) is a former international rugby union player who gained four caps and scored 54 points for the All Blacks before later switching allegiance to Wales, attaining 19 Welsh caps.

An outside-half or full-back, he was a prolific goal-kicker and a fast runner. He scored 23 points for Wales including a try in the 32–31 victory over England in 1999 played at Wembley as the Millennium Stadium was under construction in Cardiff.

== Background ==
Howarth was born in Auckland, New Zealand. He was educated at St Peter's College, Auckland.

== Rugby career ==
He played for the Auckland Marist club and Auckland. He made his All Black debut against South Africa in 1994 and played in three tests in the series.

In 1996 he switched to rugby league, signing with the North Queensland Cowboys in the Australian Rugby League competition. He played 12 games for the club and scored 49 points, including three field goals. However he was not re-signed by the club and instead returned to rugby union, playing three games for the Auckland Blues during the 1997 Super 12 season.

He moved to England to play domestic rugby for Sale at outside-half, and subsequently moved to Newport RFC in 1999 and played for the club until 2003, scoring 1,035 points and helping the Black & Ambers win the WRU Principality Cup.

Both England and Wales wanted him to play for their national teams since he qualified through allegedly Welsh/English grandparents (although eligibility rules now restrict a player to representing one country, at the time this restriction did not exist, meaning his previous caps for New Zealand did not affect him) but he chose Wales (turning down an England offer to play against New Zealand in 1997).

== Grannygate scandal ==
During the 2000 Six Nations Championship, The Sunday Telegraph revealed that Howarth (along with fellow player Brett Sinkinson) was ineligible to represent Wales. Howarth had claimed Welsh eligibility through a Welsh-born grandfather. However, following the revelations in March 2000, Howarth was unable to provide the documents to prove his eligibility and was subsequently not considered for selection in that season's remaining matches.

Howarth continued to play rugby for Newport RFC and in 2001 announced he intended to qualify for Wales under residency laws (which would have made him eligible again on 14 May 2002). However, by this time the IRB had changed the rules so that players could only represent one country and Howarth was considered a New Zealand player only. During a 2022 interview with Sky Sport New Zealand, Howarth reiterated his belief that he was Welsh qualified, noting that he chose to represent Wales over many lucrative offers: "I can tell you now if I went to England, financially I'd have been better off. I believed I was Welsh, I still believe I'm Welsh and I was proud to put the jersey on."

== Coaching ==
Howarth commenced a coaching in Auckland. He was assistant coach of the Pacific Islanders, New Zealand in 2004 and 2005. Howarth was assistant coach for the Auckland NPC team from 2006 until 2010 under Pat Lam. Auckland claimed four championships in 10 years. Howarth's tenure was ended after Auckland slumped to seventh in 2010.

In June 2012 he was appointed as backs coach to London Wasps. From September 2013 until late 2014, Howarth was backs coach for the Worcester Warriors.

== Personal life ==
Howarth is married to Marcella, and has two children. As of 2020, he owned a supermarket in Auckland.
