= Jamie Cameron =

New Zealand rugby union player (born 1970)

- Full name: James Buchan Cameron
- Born: 23 March 1970 (age 56) Stratford, New Zealand
- Height: 5 ft 9 in (175 cm)
- Weight: 187 lb (85 kg)

Rugby union career
- Position: First five-eighth
Provincial / State sides
Years	Team	Apps	(Points)
1990–91	North Harbour	16	(104)
1992–99	Taranaki	75	(614)
Super Rugby
Years	Team	Apps	(Points)
1996	Hurricanes	7	(91)

James Buchan Cameron (born 23 March 1970) is a New Zealand former professional rugby union player.

Cameron was born in Stratford and educated at Forest View High School, Tokoroa.

A first five-eighth, Cameron was a NZ Secondary Schools representative and started his provincial career at North Harbour in 1990, before moving on to Taranaki after two seasons. He accumulated 233 points in 1995 to set a Taranaki season record, with 34 points coming in a single match against Nelson Bays (another Taranaki record), then in 1996 featured in their Ranfurly Shield win. A foundation player for the Hurricanes, Cameron kicked seven penalties and a conversion in their opening match against the Auckland Blues. He spent a season in England in 1997/98 playing with London Scottish.
