= Brendan Laney =

Scotland international rugby union player

Brendan Chainsaw Laney
- Born: Brendan James Laney; 16 November 1973 (age 52) Invercargill, New Zealand
- School: Timaru Boys' High School

Rugby union career
- Position(s): flyhalf, centre, fullback
Senior career
| Years | Team | Apps | (Points) |
| 2001-05 | Edinburgh | 76 | (409) |
Provincial / State sides
| Years | Team | Apps | (Points) |
| 1991-94 | South Canterbury | 41 | (216) |
| 1995-01 | Otago | 82 | (534) |
Super Rugby
| Years | Team | Apps | (Points) |
| 1997-01 | Highlanders | 44 | (62) |
International career
| Years | Team | Apps | (Points) |
| 1993 | NZ U21 | 3 | (25) |
| 2001-04 | Scotland | 20 | (141) |

Brendan James Laney (born 16 November 1973 in Invercargill, New Zealand) is a former professional rugby union player who represented Scotland as one of the original 'kilted Kiwis'. Nicknamed "Chainsaw" for the way he cut through defences, he was also a good goal kicker. From South Canterbury in New Zealand, he began his professional rugby career at full back for the Highlanders in the Super 12. He played for Yamaha Jubilo in Japan at the end of his career.

== Scotland ==
He was controversially rushed straight into the Scottish national team by the then national coach, Ian McGeechan just two days after he arrived from New Zealand. This annoyed many ex-Scottish internationals, particularly Gavin Hastings who voiced his feelings publicly, and this was hard for Laney who had hero-worshipped Hastings as a child.

After the initial controversy died down, however, he became a popular figure with teammates and fans, through his personality and leadership. He also made his mark with Scotland, setting a new record of 24 points in a Six Nations game, and went on to equal Gavin Hastings’ record of scoring 100 points in just nine Test matches. Perhaps most significantly, he contributed 11 points in the 21-6 defeat of the Springboks at Murrayfield in 2002, Scotland’s first win over one of the tri-nations teams in 20 years. His Scotland career was not without disappointment. After heavy criticism, Laney was left out of the Six Nations fixture against Ireland due to the "psychological effect of an injury" and was not to be seen in a Scotland jersey again.

== Edinburgh Rugby ==
Laney played at flyhalf, centre and fullback for Edinburgh from 2001 to 2005. He played 76 times and scored 409 points from 15 tries, 69 penalties, 53 conversions and seven drop-goals.

== Japan ==
Laney left Edinburgh for Yamaha Jubilo in March 2005.

== After rugby ==
Laney was a rugby commentator for SKY Sport (New Zealand), but now manages a sports and rugby clothing company in Christchurch.
