= Brent Anderson (rugby union) =

- Born: Brent Leslie Anderson; 10 March 1960 (age 66) Lower Hutt, New Zealand
- Height: 1.95 m (6 ft 5 in)
- Weight: 108 kg (238 lb)
- School: Bishop Viard College

Rugby union career
- Position: Lock
Provincial / State sides
Years	Team	Apps	(Points)
1982–88	Wairarapa Bush	69	(92)
1989–93	Waikato	72	(56)
International career
Years	Team	Apps	(Points)
1986–87	New Zealand	1	(0)

Brent Leslie Anderson (born 10 March 1960) is a former New Zealand rugby union player. A lock, Anderson represented Wairarapa Bush and Waikato at a provincial level, and was a member of the New Zealand national side, the All Blacks, in 1986 and 1987. He played three matches for the All Blacks: namely a test match against Australia; and two matches against Japan that were not accorded full international status. He later used his rugby expertise as a comments person on Sky TV rugby shows
