= Arran Pene =

- Born: Arran Rewi Brett Pene; 26 October 1967 (age 59) Hamilton, New Zealand
- Height: 1.91 m (6 ft 3 in)
- Weight: 114 kg (251 lb)
- School: Fairfield College
- University: University of Otago
- Occupation(s): Hospitality owner and manager

Rugby union career
- Position: Number 8
Senior career
Years	Team	Apps	(Points)
1996–2003	Kaneka		
2003–2005	Fukuoka Sanix Bombs		
Provincial / State sides
Years	Team	Apps	(Points)
1988–1995	Otago	111	
International career
Years	Team	Apps	(Points)
1992–1994	New Zealand	15	(16)
1993–1994	New Zealand Māori	8	

Arran Rewi Brett Pene (born 26 October 1967) is a New Zealand former rugby union player. A number 8, Pene represented Otago at a provincial level, and was a member of the New Zealand national team, the All Blacks, from 1992 to 1994. He played 26 matches for the All Blacks including 15 internationals.

Awards
Preceded by Zinzan Brooke	Tom French Memorial; Māori rugby union player of the year 1993	Succeeded by Zinzan Brooke
