= Dean Sheppard =

- Born: Dean Ross Sheppard; 22 October 1970 (age 56)
- Height: 1.85 m (6 ft 1 in)
- Weight: 85 kg (187 lb)

Rugby union career
- Position: Fullback
Provincial / State sides
Years	Team	Apps	(Points)
1992-1997	Counties	38	(240)
Super Rugby
Years	Team	Apps	(Points)
1997	Blues	2	(0)

Dean Ross Sheppard (born 22 October 1970) is a former New Zealand professional rugby player.

== Biography ==
Sheppard debuted for Counties in 1992 as a fullback. He became a goal kicker mid-season as an injury cover, but performed so well with his goal kicking he became the team's regular kicker for the rest of the year. He top scored for the team for the 1992 season with 130 points and was awarded the union's most promising player award that year. His final game was the 1997 National Provincial Championship (NPC) final, which Counties lost to Canterbury.

He played one season for the Blues in 1997. He played only two Super Rugby matches that season.

After retiring from professional rugby he became the owner of the Monarch cafe in Pukekohe. He was also the chief executive of the Counties Manukau Rugby Union during the transition from the NPC in 2005 to the Air New Zealand Cup in 2006.
