= Jim Coe =

- Full name: James Neil Coe
- Born: 21 May 1964 (age 62) Wauku, New Zealand
- Height: 6 ft 6 in (198 cm)
- Weight: 233 lb (106 kg)

Rugby union career
- Position: Lock
Provincial / State sides
Years	Team	Apps	(Points)
1986–99	Counties Manukau	179	(103)
Super Rugby
Years	Team	Apps	(Points)
1997	Blues	3	(0)
International career
Years	Team	Apps	(Points)
1992–99	New Zealand Maori	20	(15)

James Neil Coe (born 21 May 1964) is a New Zealand former professional rugby union player.

A Glenbrook steel worker, Coe was a New Zealand Colts representative in 1985 and had a long career as a Counties Manukau lock, making 179 provincial appearances from 1986 to 1999. He was a regular with New Zealand Maori during the 1990s and played the 1997 Super 12 season with the Auckland Blues. The closest he came to All Blacks honours was in 1992, when he was a reserve in the national squad.

Coe was named in 2000 as the NPC's "greatest legend" for the competition's first 25 years by a panel of 50 journalists, with the award open to anyone who hadn't appeared in more than five Test matches with the All Blacks.
