= Ant Strachan =

New Zealand rugby union player

- Born: Anthony Duncan Strachan; 7 June 1966 (age 60) Te Awamutu, New Zealand
- Height: 1.75 m (5 ft 9 in)
- Weight: 82 kg (181 lb)
- School: Auckland Grammar School
- University: University of Otago

Rugby union career
- Position: Halfback
Senior career
Years	Team	Apps	(Points)
1996–2000	Kaneka		
Provincial / State sides
Years	Team	Apps	(Points)
1987–1988	Otago	6	
1989–1992	Auckland	9	
1992–1995	North Harbour	52	
International career
Years	Team	Apps	(Points)
1992–1995	New Zealand	11	(8)

Anthony Duncan Strachan (born 7 June 1966) is a former New Zealand rugby union player. A halfback, Strachan represented Otago, Auckland, and North Harbour at a provincial level, and was a member of the New Zealand national side, the All Blacks, between 1992 and 1995. He played 17 matches for the All Blacks, including 11 internationals.
