= Phil Coffin =

- Born: Phillip Hone Coffin; 24 July 1964 (age 62) Ōtorohanga, New Zealand
- Height: 1.88 m (6 ft 2 in)
- Weight: 120 kg (260 lb)
- School: Otorohanga High School

Rugby union career
- Position: Prop
Provincial / State sides
Years	Team	Apps	(Points)
1985–96	King Country	142	
1997	Wellington	6	
Super Rugby
Years	Team	Apps	(Points)
1996–97	Hurricanes	22	
International career
Years	Team	Apps	(Points)
1991–97	New Zealand Māori		
1996	New Zealand	3	(0)

Phillip Hone Coffin (born 24 July 1964) is a former New Zealand rugby union player. A prop, Coffin represented King Country and Wellington at a provincial level and played two seasons for the Hurricanes in Super Rugby.

In 1996, the inaugural year of the Super 12, Coffin was not selected for his local team, the Chiefs, but was picked up for the Wellington based franchise in the draft. After his strong performances for the Hurricanes he was selected for the New Zealand national side, the All Blacks, on the 1996 tour of South Africa, playing three matches but no internationals. These games were the wins against Eastern Province and Western Transvaal and off the bench in the draw with Griqualand West.

He played for New Zealand Māori from 1991 to 1997.
