= Greg Cooper =

- Born: Gregory John Luke Cooper; 10 June 1965 (age 61) Gisborne, New Zealand
- Height: 1.83 m (6 ft 0 in)
- Weight: 90 kg (200 lb)
- School: St John's College, Hastings
- Notable relative: Matthew Cooper (brother)

Rugby union career
- Position: Fullback
Provincial / State sides
Years	Team	Apps	(Points)
1984, 1987	Hawke's Bay		
1984–85, 1988–96	Otago		(1520)
1986–87	Auckland	23	
Super Rugby
Years	Team	Apps	(Points)
1996	Blues	3	
International career
Years	Team	Apps	(Points)
1986, 1992	New Zealand	7	(63)

Gregory John Luke Cooper (born 10 June 1965) is a New Zealand rugby union former player and current coach. A fullback, Cooper represented Hawke's Bay, Otago and Auckland at a provincial level and the Blues in Super Rugby.

In the Rugby Almanack of New Zealand, Cooper was selected as one of the "Five promising players" from the 1984 season and one of the "Five players of the year" for the 1991 season.

He was a member of the New Zealand national side, the All Blacks, in 1986 and 1992, and played seven matches, all of them tests, for the team. As of 2017 he holds the record for the most points scored for Otago.

Cooper was appointed coach of the Otago team for the 2003 and 2004 seasons.

In 2022 Cooper was named coach of the Utah Warriors in the Major League Rugby competition.
