= Jason Hewett =

- Born: Jason Alexander Hewett; 17 October 1968 (age 58) Clyde, New Zealand
- Height: 1.78 m (5 ft 10 in)
- Weight: 75 kg (165 lb)
- School: Kelston Boys' High School
- University: Massey University
- Notable relative: Dave Hewett (cousin)

Rugby union career
- Position: Halfback
Senior career
Years	Team	Apps	(Points)
1996–2002	Mitsubishi Sagamihara DynaBoars		
2002–03	Dundee HSFP		
Provincial / State sides
Years	Team	Apps	(Points)
1988–90	Manawatu	25	
1990–94	Auckland	43	
International career
Years	Team	Apps	(Points)
1991	New Zealand	1	(4)
Coaching career
- Years: Team
- 1996–2002: Mitsubishi Sagamihara DynaBoars
- 2002–03: Dundee HSFP

Jason Alexander Hewett (born 17 October 1968) is a former New Zealand rugby union player. A halfback, Hewett represented Manawatu and Auckland at domestic level. He was a member of the New Zealand national side, the All Blacks, in 1991, playing one international against Italy. In 2002, he was reported to be in talks to coach Carlow.
