= Jarrod Cunningham =

NZ rugby union player (1968–2007)

- Born: 7 September 1968 Hawke's Bay, New Zealand
- Died: 23 July 2007 (aged 38)
- Height: 1.82 m (6 ft 0 in)
- Weight: 89 kg (196 lb)
- School: Havelock North High School
- Occupation: Professional Rugby Player

Rugby union career
- Position: Fullback
Provincial / State sides
Years	Team	Apps	(Points)
2002	London Wasps		
1998–2002	London Irish	82	(848)
1997–1998	Central Vikings		(173)
1990–1996	Hawke's Bay	77	(998)
Super Rugby
Years	Team	Apps	(Points)
1997–1998	Hurricanes	12	(14)
1996	Blues		

Jarrod Cunningham (7 September 1968 – 23 July 2007) was a New Zealand rugby union fullback. Born in Hawke's Bay, Cunningham played for his home town rugby club from 1990 to 1997, during which time he was trialed for the All Blacks in 1993, but was kept out of the side by Andrew Mehrtens. He played Super 12 rugby for Auckland Blues in 1996, and then Wellington Hurricanes in the 1997/98 season. In July 1998, he joined English Premiership Rugby side London Irish, playing 82 games and scoring 18 tries and 848 points. In the 2000/1 season he was the leagues leading points scorer, with 324.

After tests at Charing Cross Hospital, Cunningham was diagnosed with suffering from amyotrophic lateral sclerosis (ALS; also known as Lou Gehrig's disease), in June 2002. He immediately retired from professional rugby, and started the Jarrod Cunningham SALSA Foundation in March 2003 with the aim of providing hope, education and inspiration for fellow sufferers of ALS. In November 2004 he was awarded the IRB Spirit of Rugby award in recognition of his work in raising awareness of the disease. He returned home to New Zealand in December 2004. He died at his home on 23 July 2007.
