= Sam Doyle (rugby union) =

- Full name: Samuel Campbell Doyle
- Born: 28 January 1970 Ōtaki, New Zealand
- Died: 1 October 2022 (aged 52)
- Height: 5 ft 10 in (178 cm)
- Weight: 188 lb (85 kg)

Rugby union career
- Position: Fullback
Provincial / State sides
Years	Team	Apps	(Points)
1991–93	Manawatu	43	(129)
1994–97	Wellington	30	(55)
1998–99	Horowhenua-Kapiti	19	(65)
Super Rugby
Years	Team	Apps	(Points)
1996	Hurricanes	2	(5)
International career
Years	Team	Apps	(Points)
1992–94	NZ Māori	15	(51)

Samuel Campbell Doyle (28 January 1970 — 1 October 2022) was a New Zealand professional rugby union player.

Raised in Ōtaki, Doyle was the oldest of four children and played locally for the Rāhui club.

Doyle, primarily a fullback, played top-level rugby in New Zealand through the 1990s. He was an All Black triallist and made several appearances for New Zealand Māori, including a match against the touring 1993 British Lions. In 1996, Doyle joined the Hurricanes as an injury replacement for Christian Cullen and played two Super 12 matches, scoring a try in their win over the Highlanders at Carisbrook.

A teacher by profession, Doyle taught at te reo Māori-speaking schools and had five years as a principal.

Doyle died of leukemia in 2022 at the age of 52.
