= Bruce Hansen (rugby union) =

- Full name: Bruce William Hansen
- Born: 31 October 1964 (age 62)
- Height: 186 cm (6 ft 1 in)
- Weight: 106 kg (234 lb)

Rugby union career
- Position: Flanker
Provincial / State sides
Years	Team	Apps	(Points)
1986–89	Wanganui	50	(68)
1990	Hawke's Bay	2	(4)
1991–93	Wanganui	33	(79)
1994–96	Manawatu	18	(5)
Super Rugby
Years	Team	Apps	(Points)
1996	Hurricanes	2	(0)

Bruce William Hansen (born 31 October 1964) is a New Zealand former professional rugby union player.

Hailing from Taihape, Hansen was a boarder at Palmerston North Boys' High School.

Hansen, a NZ under-18s representative, worked as a stock buyer during his rugby career, which included All Blacks trials in both 1990 and 1992. He made the Hurricanes squad for the inaugural Super 12 season in 1996 and was a flanker in their tournament opener against the Auckland Blues, then succumbed to a shoulder injury in the round three win over Transvaal at McLean Park. Seeing out the season at Manawatu, Hansen became one of few players to feature against all 27 New Zealand NPC unions, before the injury caused him to retire from rugby.
