= List of 2023–24 Super Rugby transfers =

This is a list of player movements for Super Rugby teams prior to the end of the 2024 Super Rugby Pacific season. Departure and arrivals of all players that were included in a Super Rugby squad for 2023 or 2024 are listed here, regardless of when it occurred. Future-dated transfers are only included if confirmed by the player or his agent, his former team or his new team.

Notes

- 2023 players listed are all players that were named in the initial senior squad, or subsequently included in a 23-man match day squad at any game during the season.
- (did not play) denotes that a player did not play at all during the season due to injury or non-selection. These players are included to indicate they were contracted to the team.
- (short-term) denotes that a player wasn't initially contracted, but came in during the season. This could either be a club rugby player coming in as injury cover, or a player whose contract had expired at another team (typically in the northern hemisphere).
- (development squad) denotes a player that wasn't named in the original squad, but was announced as signing as a development player. These are often younger players or club players. Different teams use different names for development players. Other names used include (wider training group) or (wider training squad).
- Flags are only shown for players moving to or from another country.
- Players may play in several positions, but are listed in only one.

== Fiji ==
=== Drua ===
Drua transfers 2023–2024
Pos	2023 squad	Out	In	2024 players
PR	Mesake Doge; Haereiti Hetet; Jone Koroiduadua; Livai Natave; Timoci Sauvoli (did not play); Samu Tawake; Jone Tiko (short-term); Meli Tuni; Emosi Tuqiri; Kaliopasi Uluilakepa	(substituted off) Timoci Sauvoli (to (Australia) Wests); (substituted off) Jone Tiko (returned to (Australia) Wests); (substituted off) Kaliopasi Uluilakepa (released)		Mesake Doge; Haereiti Hetet; Jone Koroiduadua; Livai Natave; Samu Tawake; Meli Tuni; Emosi Tuqiri
HK	Mesu Dolokoto; Tevita Ikanivere; Zuriel Togiatama			Mesu Dolokoto; Tevita Ikanivere; Zuriel Togiatama
LK	Te Ahiwaru Cirikidaveta; Chris Minimbi; Isoa Nasilasila; Ratu Leone Rotuisolia; Sorovakatini Tuifagalele; Sailosi Vukalokalo (development squad, did not play); Etonia Waqa (short-term)	(substituted off) Chris Minimbi (to (Australia) University of Queensland); (substituted off) Sorovakatini Tuifagalele (to Suva)	(substituted in) Mesake Vocevoce (from Nadi)	Te Ahiwaru Cirikidaveta; Isoa Nasilasila; Ratu Leone Rotuisolia; Sailosi Vukalokalo; Mesake Vocevoce (development squad); Etonia Waqa
BR	Elia Canakaivata; Meli Derenalagi; Vilive Miramira; Raikabula Momoedonu (did not play); Motikai Murray (development squad); Rusiate Nasove; Kitione Salawa Jr. Joseva Tamani	(substituted off) Raikabula Momoedonu (released); (substituted off) Rusiate Nasove (to (Italy) Valorugby Emilia); (substituted off) Joseva Tamani (to (France) Colomiers)		Elia Canakaivata; Meli Derenalagi; Vilive Miramira; Motikai Murray; Kitione Salawa Jr.
SH	Philip Baselala; Simione Kuruvoli (did not play); Frank Lomani; Ratu Peni Matawalu		(substituted in) Moses Sorovi (from (Australia) Rebels)	Philip Baselala; Simione Kuruvoli; Frank Lomani; Ratu Peni Matawalu; Moses Sorovi (short-term)
FH	Caleb Muntz; Isikeli Rabitu (development squad, did not play); Teti Tela; Kemu Valetini (short-term)	(substituted off) Teti Tela (retired)	(substituted in) Isaiah Armstrong-Ravula (from (New Zealand) Manawatu)	Isaiah Armstrong-Ravula; Caleb Muntz; Isikeli Rabitu; Kemu Valetini
CE	Iosefo Masi; Michael Naitokani; Kalione Nasoko; Apisalome Vota	(substituted off) Kalione Nasoko (to (France) Tarbes)	(substituted in) Waqa Nalaga (from (New Zealand) Manawatu)	Iosefo Masi; Michael Naitokani; Waqa Nalaga; Apisalome Vota
WG	Taniela Rakuro (short-term); Kalaveti Ravouvou; Selestino Ravutaumada; Tuidraki Samusamuvodre; Eroni Sau	(substituted off) Kalaveti Ravouvou (to (England) Bristol Bears); (substituted off) Eroni Sau (to (France) Stade Montois)	(substituted in) Epeli Momo (from (France) Montauban); (substituted in) Junior Ratuva (from (France) Soyaux Angoulême)	Epeli Momo; Taniela Rakuro; Junior Ratuva (short-term); Selestino Ravutaumada; Tuidraki Samusamuvodre
FB	Ilaisa Droasese; Kitione Taliga	(substituted off) Kitione Taliga (to Nadi)		Ilaisa Droasese
Coach	Mick Byrne			Mick Byrne

== Pacific Islands ==
=== Moana Pasifika ===
Moana Pasifika transfers 2023–2024
Pos	2023 squad	Out	In	2024 players
PR	Joe Apikotoa; Chris Apoua; Suetena Asomua (short-term); Sekope Kepu (did not play); Tau Koloamatangi; Ezekiel Lindenmuth; Abraham Pole; Isi Tuʻungafasi	(substituted off) Joe Apikotoa (to (United States) Anthem Rugby Carolina); (substituted off) Chris Apoua (to (New Zealand) Northland); (substituted off) Tau Koloamatangi (to (New Zealand) Otago); (substituted off) Ezekiel Lindenmuth (to (United States) Houston SaberCats); (substituted off) Isi Tuʻungafasi (to (New Zealand) Hawke's Bay)	(substituted in) Donald Brighouse (from (New Zealand) Taranaki); (substituted in) Ivan Fepuleai (from (Australia) Manly); (substituted in) Tevita Langi (from (New Zealand) North Harbour); (substituted in) Sateki Latu (from (Australia) Waratahs); (substituted in) James Lay (from (New Zealand) Blues); (substituted in) Sione Mafileo (from (New Zealand) North Harbour)	Suetena Asomua; Donald Brighouse; Ivan Fepuleai (short-term); Sekope Kepu; Tevita Langi (short-term); Sateki Latu; James Lay; Sione Mafileo (short-term); Abraham Pole
HK	Sam Moli; Ray Niuia; Joe Royal (short-term); Luteru Tolai	(substituted off) Ray Niuia (retired); (substituted off) Joe Royal (to (New Zealand) Auckland); (substituted off) Luteru Tolai (to (France) Biarritz)	(substituted in) Thomas Maka (from (Australia) Gordon); (substituted in) Sama Malolo (from (United States) San Diego Legion)	Thomas Maka; Sama Malolo; Sam Moli
LK	Michael Curry; Potu Leavasa Jr. (short-term); Mike McKee; Alex McRobbie; Mahonri Ngakuru; Sam Slade	(substituted off) Potu Leavasa Jr. (released); (substituted off) Mike McKee (to (New Zealand) Southland); (substituted off) Alex McRobbie (to (New Zealand) Counties Manukau); (substituted off) Mahonri Ngakuru (to (United States) Seattle Seawolves)	(substituted in) Allan Craig (from (New Zealand) Northland); (substituted in) Viliami Napa'a (from (New Zealand) Tasman); (substituted in) Irie Papuni (from (Australia) Western Sydney Two Blues); (substituted in) Tom Savage (from (Japan) Tokyo Sungoliath); (substituted in) Ofa Tauatevalu (from (New Zealand) Manawatu)	Allan Craig (short-term); Michael Curry (short-term); Viliami Napa'a; Irie Papuni; Tom Savage; Sam Slade; Ofa Tauatevalu
BR	Miracle Faiʻilagi; Penitoa Finau; Solomone Funaki; Lotu Inisi; Niko Jones (short-term); Jack Lam (did not play); Jonah Mau'u (short-term); Alamanda Motuga; Sione Tuipulotu	(substituted off) Penitoa Finau (to (New Zealand) Bay of Plenty); (substituted off) Jack Lam (to (New Zealand) Waikato); (substituted off) Jonah Mau'u (to (United States) New Orleans Gold); (substituted off) Sione Tuipulotu (to (New Zealand) Auckland)	(substituted in) Sione Havili Talitui (from (New Zealand) Crusaders); (substituted in) Jacob Norris (from (Australia) Force); (substituted in) Semisi Paea (from (United States) New England Free Jacks); (substituted in) Ola Tauelangi (from (Australia) Waratahs)	Miracle Faiʻilagi; Solomone Funaki; Sione Havili Talitui; Lotu Inisi; Niko Jones (short-term); Alamanda Motuga; Jacob Norris (short-term); Semisi Paea; Ola Tauelangi
SH	Ere Enari; Manu Paea; Jonathan Taumateine; Sam Wye (short-term)	(substituted off) Manu Paea (released); (substituted off) Sam Wye (to (New Zealand) Hawke's Bay)	(substituted in) Aisea Halo (from (New Zealand) North Harbour); (substituted in) Melani Matavao (from Samoa Sevens); (substituted in) Siaosi Nginingini (from (New Zealand) North Harbour)	Ere Enari; Aisea Halo; Melani Matavao (short-term); Siaosi Nginingini (development squad); Jonathan Taumateine
FH	William Havili; Christian Lealiifano; Lincoln McClutchie	(substituted off) Lincoln McClutchie (to (United States) San Diego Legion)		William Havili; Christian Lealiifano
CE	Levi Aumua; Fine Inisi; D'Angelo Leuila; Henry Taefu	(substituted off) Levi Aumua (to (New Zealand) Crusaders)	(substituted in) Lalomilo Lalomilo (from (New Zealand) Chiefs); (substituted in) Pepesana Patafilo (from (New Zealand) Crusaders)	Fine Inisi; Lalomilo Lalomilo; D'Angelo Leuila; Pepesana Patafilo; Henry Taefu
WG	Tomasi Alosio; Tima Fainga'anuku; Neria Fomai; Timoci Tavatavanawai; Danny Toala; Anzelo Tuitavuki	(substituted off) Tomasi Alosio (to (United States) Anthem Rugby Carolina); (substituted off) Tima Fainga'anuku (to (New Zealand) Manawatu); (substituted off) Timoci Tavatavanawai (to (New Zealand) Highlanders)	(substituted in) Nigel Ah Wong (unattached); (substituted in) Viliami Fine (from (New Zealand) Southland); (substituted in) Julian Savea (from (New Zealand) Hurricanes); Kyren Taumoefolau (from Tonga Sevens)	Nigel Ah Wong; Viliami Fine; Neria Fomai; Julian Savea; Kyren Taumoefolau (development squad); Danny Toala; Anzelo Tuitavuki
FB	Lolagi Visinia	(substituted off) Lolagi Visinia (to (New Zealand) Hawke's Bay)	(substituted in) Otumaka Mausia (from (Australia) Western Sydney Two Blues)	Otumaka Mausia
Coach	Aaron Mauger	(substituted off) Aaron Mauger (released)	(substituted in) Tana Umaga (from Blues (assistant))	Tana Umaga

== See also ==
- List of 2023–24 Premiership Rugby transfers
- List of 2023–24 United Rugby Championship transfers
- List of 2023–24 Top 14 transfers
- List of 2023–24 RFU Championship transfers
- List of 2023–24 Rugby Pro D2 transfers
- SANZAAR
- Super Rugby franchise areas
