= List of 2024–25 Super Rugby transfers =

This is a list of player transfers involving Super Rugby teams before or during 2025 Super Rugby Pacific season.

== Blues ==
=== Players in ===
- (New Zealand) Ben Ake from (New Zealand) Auckland
- (New Zealand) Beauden Barrett returned from (Japan) Toyota Verblitz
- (New Zealand) Cam Christie from (New Zealand) North Harbour
- (New Zealand) James Mullan from (New Zealand) Crusaders
- (New Zealand) Reon Paul from (New Zealand) Bay of Plenty
- (New Zealand) Payton Spencer from (New Zealand) Auckland
- (New Zealand) Xavi Taele from (New Zealand) Auckland
- (New Zealand) Nathaniel Pole promoted from academy, short-term
- (New Zealand) Tristyn Cook from (New Zealand) North Harbour short-term
- (New Zealand) Bryn Gordon from (New Zealand) North Harbour short-term
- (New Zealand) Hamdahn Tuipulotu from (New Zealand) Southland short-term

=== Players out ===
- (New Zealand) Kade Banks to (New Zealand) Hurricanes
- (New Zealand) Lucas Cashmore to (New Zealand) Hurricanes
- (New Zealand) Bryce Heem injured
- (New Zealand) Akira Ioane to (Japan) Hanazono Kintetsu Liners
- Rob Rush to New Zealand Sevens
- (New Zealand) Caleb Tangitau to (New Zealand) Highlanders
- (New Zealand) James Thompson to (New Zealand) Chiefs
- (New Zealand) Soane Vikena to (New Zealand) Highlanders

== Brumbies ==
=== Players in ===
- (Australia) Tevita Alatini promoted from academy
- (Samoa) David Feliuai from (Australia) Melbourne Rebels
- (Australia) Lachlan Hooper promoted from academy
- (Australia) Kadin Pritchard promoted from academy
- (Australia) Tuaina Taii Tualima from (Australia) Melbourne Rebels
- (Australia) Shane Wilcox promoted from academy
- (Tonga) Feao Fotuaika from (France) Lyon
- (Australia) Lington Ieli promoted from academy, short-term
- (Fiji) Judah Saumaisue from (Australia) Melbourne Rebels Academy (short-term)

=== Players out ===
- (New Zealand) Jahrome Brown to (New Zealand) Chiefs
- (Australia) Fred Kaihea released
- (New Zealand) Sefo Kautai to (New Zealand) Highlanders
- (Australia) Ed Kennedy retired
- (Australia) Connal McInerney to (United States) New England Free Jacks
- (Australia) Darcy Swain to (Australia) Western Force
- (New Zealand) Tamati Tua to (England) Exeter Chiefs

== Chiefs ==
=== Players in ===
- (New Zealand) Jahrome Brown from (Australia) Brumbies
- (New Zealand) Leroy Carter from (New Zealand) Bay of Plenty
- (New Zealand) Brodie McAlister from (New Zealand) Crusaders
- (New Zealand) Fiti Sa from (New Zealand) Taranaki
- (Fiji) Manasa Mataele from (New Zealand) Crusaders short-term
- (New Zealand) James Thompson from (New Zealand) Blues short-term

=== Players out ===
- (Scotland) Hamilton Burr returned to (New Zealand) Waikato
- (New Zealand) Tom Florence to (Japan) Toyota Industries Shuttles Aichi
- (New Zealand) Josh Ioane to (Ireland) Connacht
- (New Zealand) Kauvaka Kaivelata to (Japan) Kobelco Kobe Steelers
- (Fiji) Peniasi Malimali to (New Zealand) Counties Manukau
- (New Zealand) Mills Sanerivi to (New Zealand) Moana Pasifika
- (New Zealand) Tyrone Thompson to (Australia) Newcastle Knights

== Crusaders ==
=== Players in ===
- (New Zealand) Braydon Ennor returned from injury
- (Australia) James O'Connor from (Australia) Queensland Reds
- (New Zealand) Kyle Preston from (New Zealand) Wellington
- (New Zealand) Xavier Saifoloi from (New Zealand) Waikato
- (New Zealand) Aki Tuivailala from (New Zealand) Waikato
- (New Zealand) Manumaua Letiu promoted from academy, short-term
- (New Zealand) Sam Matenga from (New Zealand) Tasman short-term
- (New Zealand) Matt Moulds from (New Zealand) Northland short-term
- (New Zealand) Lewis Ponini from (Australia) NSW Waratahs short-term

=== Players out ===
- (New Zealand) Toby Arnold retired
- (New Zealand) Fergus Burke to (England) Saracens
- (New Zealand) Ryan Crotty retired
- (New Zealand) Owen Franks retired
- (New Zealand) Zach Gallagher to (New Zealand) Hurricanes
- (Wales) Leigh Halfpenny to (England) Harlequins
- (England) Willi Heinz retired
- (New Zealand) Riley Hohepa to (New Zealand) Hurricanes
- (New Zealand) Quentin MacDonald returned to (New Zealand) Tasman
- (Fiji) Manasa Mataele to (New Zealand) Chiefs
- (New Zealand) Brodie McAlister to (New Zealand) Chiefs
- (New Zealand) Joe Moody retired
- (New Zealand) James Mullan to (New Zealand) Blues
- (New Zealand) Heremaia Murray to (Australia) Queensland Reds
- (New Zealand) Taine Robinson to (New Zealand) Highlanders
- (New Zealand) Jone Rova to (New Zealand) Hurricanes

== Drua ==
=== Players in ===
- (Fiji) Vuate Karawalevu from (Australia) NSW Waratahs
- Ponepati Loganimasi from Fiji Sevens
- (Fiji) Peni Ravai from (Australia) Queensland Reds
- (Fiji) Inia Tabuavou from (France) Racing 92
- (Fiji) Joseva Tamani from (France) Colomiers
- (Fiji) Isoa Tuwai promoted from development squad, short-term
- (Fiji) Leone Nawai from (New Zealand) Taranaki short-term

=== Players out ===
- (Fiji) Jone Koroiduadua to (United States) New England Free Jacks
- (Fiji) Michael Naitokani released
- (Fiji) Moses Sorovi released
- (Fiji) Apisalome Vota released
- (Fiji) Waqa Nalaga to (New Zealand) Otago

== Force ==
=== Players in ===
- (Australia) Nick Champion de Crespigny from (France) Castres
- (England) Nic Dolly from (England) Leicester Tigers
- (New Zealand) Vaiolini Ekuasi from (Australia) Melbourne Rebels
- (Australia) Mac Grealy from (Australia) Queensland Reds
- (Australia) Harry Johnson-Holmes from (Australia) NSW Waratahs
- (Australia) Kane Koteka returned from suspension
- (Australia) Brandon Paenga-Amosa from (France) Montpellier
- (Australia) Divad Palu from (Australia) Melbourne Rebels
- (Australia) Doug Philipson promoted from academy
- (Australia) Dylan Pietsch from (Australia) NSW Waratahs
- (New Zealand) Matt Proctor from (Australia) Melbourne Rebels
- (Australia) Henry Robertson returned from injury
- (Australia) Tom Robertson returned from sabbatical
- (Australia) Darcy Swain from (Australia) Brumbies
- (Fiji) Josh Thompson from (Australia) West Harbour
- (New Zealand) Sio Tomkinson from (Wales) Dragons
- (Australia) Mitch Watts from (Australia) Randwick
- (New Zealand) Joshua Smith from (New Zealand) Hawke's Bay short-term
- (Australia) Tom Osborne from (England) Harlequins short-term
- (New Zealand) Coby Miln from (Australia) Warringah short-term
- (New Zealand) Fatongia Paea from (New Zealand) North Harbour short-term
- (Australia) Albert Alcock from (Australia) West Harbour short-term
- (New Zealand) Alex Harford from (New Zealand) Auckland short-term

=== Players out ===
- (Australia) Siosifa Amone to (Australia) NSW Waratahs
- (Australia) Tim Anstee to (United States) RFC Los Angeles
- (New Zealand) Josh Bartlett to (New Zealand) Highlanders
- (Australia) Ollie Callan released
- (Australia) Ollie Cummins to (France) Agen
- (Tonga) Nikolai Foliaki to (United States) New Orleans Gold
- (New Zealand) Tom Franklin to (France) Pau
- (New Zealand) Ben Funnell returned to (New Zealand) Canterbury
- (Australia) Charlie Hancock released
- (New Zealand) Joel Hintz returned to (New Zealand) Hawke's Bay
- (Australia) Feleti Kaitu'u to (France) Racing 92
- (New Zealand) Felix Kalapu to (Australia) NSW Waratahs
- (Argentina) Santiago Medrano to (France) Vannes
- (Australia) Henry O'Donnell to (Australia) NSW Waratahs
- (New Zealand) Campbell Parata to (New Zealand) Tasman
- (Zimbabwe) Ian Prior released
- (Australia) Izack Rodda to (France) Provence
- (England) Sam Spink to (England) Saracens
- (Samoa) Chase Tiatia to (Japan) Secom Rugguts
- (Australia) Angus Wagner released
- (Australia) Michael Wells retired

== Highlanders ==
=== Players in ===
- (New Zealand) Josh Bartlett from (Australia) Western Force
- (New Zealand) TK Howden from (New Zealand) Hurricanes
- (New Zealand) Sefo Kautai from (Australia) Brumbies
- (New Zealand) Veveni Lasaqa from (Australia) Hurricanes
- (New Zealand) Michael Manson from (United States) Utah Warriors
- (Tonga) Lui Naeata from (New Zealand) Otago
- (New Zealand) Taine Robinson from (New Zealand) Crusaders
- (New Zealand) Caleb Tangitau from (New Zealand) Blues
- (New Zealand) Thomas Umaga-Jensen returned from injury
- (New Zealand) Soane Vikena from (New Zealand) Blues
- (New Zealand) Josh Whaanga from (New Zealand) Otago
- (New Zealand) Adam Lennox from (New Zealand) Taranaki short-term
- (New Zealand) Michael Loft from (New Zealand) Taranaki short-term
- (New Zealand) Tai Cribb from (New Zealand) Waikato short-term
- (Tonga) Taniela Filimone from (New Zealand) Manawatu short-term

=== Players out ===
- (New Zealand) Jermaine Ainsley to (France) Lyon
- (Argentina) Martín Bogado to (France) Oyonnax
- (New Zealand) Connor Garden-Bachop deceased
- (New Zealand) Billy Harmon to (Japan) Yokohama Canon Eagles
- (New Zealand) Max Hicks to (France) Perpignan
- (New Zealand) Ricky Jackson released
- (New Zealand) Ayden Johnstone to (New Zealand) Waikato
- (New Zealand) Pari Pari Parkinson to (Japan) Green Rockets Tokatsu
- (Wales) Rhys Patchell to (Japan) Green Rockets Tokatsu
- (New Zealand) Hugo Plummer to (New Zealand) Hurricanes
- (New Zealand) Tom Sanders injured
- (New Zealand) Josh Timu injured
- (New Zealand) Will Tucker to (New Zealand) Hurricanes
- (New Zealand) Solomone Tukuafu to (France) Biarritz
- (New Zealand) Matt Whaanga to (New Zealand) Southland

== Hurricanes ==
=== Players in ===
- (New Zealand) Tom Allen from (New Zealand) Hawke's Bay
- (New Zealand) Kade Banks from (New Zealand) Blues
- (New Zealand) Lucas Cashmore from (New Zealand) Blues
- (New Zealand) Tjay Clarke from (New Zealand) Wellington
- (Samoa) Ere Enari from (New Zealand) Moana Pasifika
- (New Zealand) Fehi Fineanganofo from (New Zealand) Bay of Plenty
- (New Zealand) Zach Gallagher from (New Zealand) Crusaders
- (New Zealand) Riley Hohepa from (New Zealand) Crusaders
- (New Zealand) Arese Poliko from (New Zealand) Taranaki
- (New Zealand) Will Tucker from (New Zealand) Highlanders
- (New Zealand) Callum Harkin from (New Zealand) Wellington short-term
- (New Zealand) Hugo Plummer from (New Zealand) Highlanders short-term
- (New Zealand) Jone Rova from (New Zealand) Crusaders short-term
- (New Zealand) Nic Souchon from (New Zealand) Southland short-term

=== Players out ===
- (New Zealand) Jordie Barrett to (Ireland) Leinster
- (Australia) Ben Grant to (Australia) NSW Waratahs
- (New Zealand) TK Howden to (New Zealand) Highlanders
- (New Zealand) Richard Judd to (United States) San Diego Legion
- (New Zealand) Kianu Kereru-Symes to (Japan) Urayasu D-Rocks
- (New Zealand) Veveni Lasaqa to (New Zealand) Highlanders
- (New Zealand) Josh Moorby to (France) Montpellier
- (New Zealand) Aidan Morgan to (Ireland) Ulster
- (New Zealand) James O'Reilly released
- (New Zealand) TJ Perenara to (Japan) Black Rams Tokyo
- (New Zealand) Salesi Rayasi to (France) Vannes
- (New Zealand) Justin Sangster to (Japan) Shizuoka Blue Revs
- (New Zealand) James Tucker to (Japan) Yakult Levins Toda

== Moana Pasifika ==
=== Players in ===
- (New Zealand) Solomon Alaimalo from (Australia) Wests Tigers
- (New Zealand) Chris Apoua from (New Zealand) Northland
- (Australia) Pone Fa'amausili from (Australia) Melbourne Rebels
- (Samoa) Losi Filipo from (New Zealand) Wellington
- (New Zealand) Jackson Garden-Bachop from (New Zealand) Wellington
- (Tonga) Patrick Pellegrini from (England) Coventry
- (New Zealand) Ardie Savea from (Japan) Kobelco Kobe Steelers
- (New Zealand) Tito Tuipulotu from (New Zealand) Auckland
- Tuna Tuitama from Samoa Sevens
- (New Zealand) Tevita Ofa from (New Zealand) Counties Manukau
- (New Zealand) Feleti Sae-Taʻufoʻou from (New Zealand) Manawatu short-term}
- (New Zealand) Mills Sanerivi from (New Zealand) Chiefs short-term
- (New Zealand) Semisi Tupou Ta'eiloa from (New Zealand) Southland short-term
- (New Zealand) Monu Moli from (New Zealand) Tasman short-term

=== Players out ===
- (Samoa) Nigel Ah Wong to (New Zealand) Auckland
- (New Zealand) Suetena Asomua to (New Zealand) Counties Manukau
- (Samoa) Donald Brighouse released
- (Samoa) Ere Enari to (New Zealand) Hurricanes
- (Samoa) Ivan Fepuleai released
- (Tonga) Viliami Fine to (New Zealand) Southland
- (Samoa) Solomone Funaki to (Wales) Dragons
- (New Zealand) Niko Jones returned to (New Zealand) Auckland
- (Australia) Sekope Kepu retired
- (New Zealand) Tevita Langi returned to (New Zealand) North Harbour
- (Australia) Sateki Latu to (New Zealand) Counties Manukau
- (Samoa) Christian Leali'ifano to (United States) RFC Los Angeles
- (Samoa) D'Angelo Leuila to (United States) Utah Warriors
- (Tonga) Otumaka Mausia released
- (Tonga) Viliami Napa'a to (New Zealand) Tasman
- (Tonga) Siaosi Nginingini returned to (New Zealand) North Harbour
- (New Zealand) Jacob Norris returned to (New Zealand) Bay of Plenty
- (Samoa) Henry Taefu to (Japan) Red Hurricanes Osaka
- (Tonga) Anzelo Tuitavuki to (France) Colomiers

== Rebels ==
=== Players out ===
- (Australia) Lachie Anderson to (Australia) Queensland Reds
- (Australia) Luke Callan to (Japan) Yakult Levins Toda
- (Australia) Josh Canham to (Australia) Queensland Reds
- (Australia) Filipo Daugunu to (Australia) Queensland Reds
- (Australia) Ethan Dobbins to (Australia) NSW Waratahs
- (New Zealand) Vaiolini Ekuasi to (Australia) Western Force
- (South Africa) Cabous Eloff to (South Africa) Western Province
- (Australia) Pone Fa'amausili to (New Zealand) Moana Pasifika
- (Samoa) David Feliuai to (Australia) Brumbies
- (Australia) Matt Gibbon to (Australia) Queensland Reds
- (Australia) Carter Gordon to (Australia) Gold Coast Titans
- (Australia) Mason Gordon to (Australia) Queensland Reds
- (Australia) Zac Hough released
- (Australia) Nick Jooste to (United States) San Diego Legion
- (Australia) Isaac Aedo Kailea to (Australia) NSW Waratahs
- (Australia) Andrew Kellaway to (Australia) NSW Waratahs
- (Australia) Josh Kemeny to (England) Northampton Saints
- (Australia) Darby Lancaster to (Australia) NSW Waratahs
- (Australia) Rob Leota to (Australia) NSW Waratahs
- (South Africa) Ryan Louwrens to (France) Montpellier
- (Australia) Alex Mafi to (Japan) Tokyo Sungoliath
- (Australia) Daniel Maiava to (New Zealand) Southland
- (England) Jack Maunder to (France) Agen
- (Fiji) Maciu Nabolakasi released
- (Australia) Lebron Naea released
- (Australia) Divad Palu to (Australia) Western Force
- (Australia) Joe Pincus retired
- (New Zealand) Matt Proctor to (Australia) Western Force
- (Australia) Lukas Ripley to (Australia) NSW Waratahs
- (Australia) Lukhan Salakaia-Loto to (Australia) Queensland Reds
- (Fiji) Angelo Smith to (Australia) NSW Waratahs
- (Australia) Jake Strachan to (France) Aurillac
- (Australia) Sam Talakai to (Scotland) Glasgow Warriors
- (Australia) Tuaina Taii Tualima to (Australia) Brumbies
- (Australia) Taniela Tupou to (Australia) NSW Waratahs
- (Australia) James Tuttle retired
- (Australia) Jordan Uelese to (France) Montpellier
- (Australia) David Vaihu released
- (Australia) Glen Vaihu to (Australia) Souths Logan Magpies
- (Australia) Brad Wilkin to (United States) San Diego Legion

== Reds ==
=== Players in ===
- (Australia) Lachie Anderson from (Australia) Melbourne Rebels
- (Australia) Josh Canham from (Australia) Melbourne Rebels
- (Australia) Filipo Daugunu from (Australia) Melbourne Rebels
- (Australia) Jude Gibbs from (Australia) Northern Suburbs
- (Australia) Matt Gibbon from (Australia) Melbourne Rebels
- (Australia) Mason Gordon from (Australia) Melbourne Rebels
- (Australia) Trevor King promoted from academy
- (Australia) Will McCulloch promoted from academy
- (Australia) Dre Pakeho promoted from academy
- (Australia) Lukhan Salakaia-Loto from (Australia) Melbourne Rebels
- (New Zealand) Heremaia Murray from (New Zealand) Crusaders
- (Australia) Matt Brice promoted from academy, short-term
- (Australia) Nick Bloomfield from (Australia) Easts Tigers short-term

=== Players out ===
- (Australia) Connor Anderson to (Japan) Chugoku Red Regulions
- (Australia) Taj Annan to (Australia) Newcastle Knights
- (Australia) Floyd Aubrey to (Australia) Souths Logan Magpies
- (Australia) Lawson Creighton to (Australia) NSW Waratahs
- (Ireland) Cormac Daly to (Japan) Yokohama Canon Eagles
- (Australia) Mac Grealy to (Australia) Western Force
- (Australia) James O'Connor to (New Zealand) Crusaders
- (Australia) Jordan Petaia released
- (Fiji) Peni Ravai to (Fiji) Fijian Drua
- (Australia) Taine Roiri released
- (Australia) Suliasi Vunivalu to (France) La Rochelle
- (Australia) Mason Gordon retired

== Waratahs ==
=== Players in ===
- (New Zealand) Ale Aho from (New Zealand) Otago
- (Australia) Siosifa Amone from (Australia) Western Force
- (Australia) Adrian Brown from (Australia) Warringah
- (Australia) Lawson Creighton from (Australia) Queensland Reds
- (Australia) Ethan Dobbins from (Australia) Melbourne Rebels
- (Australia) Ben Grant from (New Zealand) Hurricanes
- (Australia) Clem Halaholo from (Australia) Sydney University
- (Australia) James Hendren from (Australia) Randwick
- (Australia) Isaac Aedo Kailea from (Australia) Melbourne Rebels
- (Australia) Andrew Kellaway from (Australia) Melbourne Rebels
- (Australia) Darby Lancaster from (Australia) Melbourne Rebels
- (Australia) Rob Leota from (Australia) Melbourne Rebels
- (Australia) Henry O'Donnell from (Australia) Western Force
- (Australia) Lukas Ripley from (Australia) Melbourne Rebels
- (Australia) Jackson Ropata from (Australia) Southern Districts
- (Australia) Archie Saunders from (Australia) Randwick
- (Fiji) Angelo Smith from (Australia) Melbourne Rebels
- (Australia) Joseph Sua'ali'i from (Australia) Sydney Roosters
- (Australia) Leafi Talataina from (Australia) Melbourne Rebels Academy
- (Australia) Taniela Tupou from (Australia) Melbourne Rebels
- (England) Jamie Adamson from (Australia) Easts
- (New Zealand) Felix Kalapu from (Australia) Western Force short-term
- (Ireland) Michael McDonald from (Ireland) Ulster short-term

=== Players out ===
- (Australia) Pone Fa'amausili returned to (Australia) Melbourne Rebels
- (Tonga) Jay Fonokalafi released
- (Australia) Theo Fourie released
- (Australia) Ned Hanigan to (France) Provence
- (Australia) Will Harrison to (Japan) Hanazono Kintetsu Liners
- (Australia) Jed Holloway to (United States) San Diego Legion
- (Australia) Archer Holz to (Wales) Scarlets
- (Australia) Harry Johnson-Holmes to (Australia) Western Force
- (Fiji) Vuate Karawalevu to (Fiji) Fijian Drua
- (Australia) Harry Lloyd retired
- (New Zealand) Sione Misiloi released
- (Australia) Mark Nawaqanitawase to (Australia) Sydney Roosters
- (Australia) Izaia Perese to (England) Leicester Tigers
- (Argentina) Enrique Pieretto to (France) Provence
- (Australia) Dylan Pietsch to (Australia) Western Force
- (New Zealand) Lewis Ponini to (New Zealand) Crusaders
- (Australia) Tom Ross to (France) Nice
- (Australia) Paddy Ryan returned to (Japan) Black Rams Tokyo
- (Scotland) Michael Scott to (United States) Houston SaberCats
- (Australia) Ned Slack-Smith released
- (England) Ben Sugars to (United States) RFC Los Angeles
- (Australia) Lachlan Swinton to (France) Bordeaux
- (England) Hayden Thompson-Stringer to (France) Provence
- (Scotland) Sam Thomson released
- (Scotland) George Thornton released
- (Australia) Mosese Tuipulotu to (Scotland) Edinburgh
- (Australia) Hunter Ward released
- (Australia) Harry Wilson to (Wales) Dragons

== See also ==
- List of 2024–25 Premiership Rugby transfers
- List of 2024–25 United Rugby Championship transfers
- List of 2024–25 RFU Championship transfers
- List of 2024–25 Top 14 transfers
- List of 2024–25 Rugby Pro D2 transfers
- List of 2024–25 Major League Rugby transfers
- SANZAAR
- Super Rugby franchise areas
