= List of Moana Pasifika players =

This is a list of rugby union footballers who have played for Moana Pasifika in Super Rugby. The list includes any player that has played in a regular season match, semi-final or final for Moana Pasifika, ordered by debut date and name. Moana Pasifika first competed in the 2022 Super Rugby Pacific season and ceased competing at the end of the 2026 Super Rugby Pacific season.

== Players ==
No.	Name	Caps	Tries	C	P	DG	Points	Debut	Last
1	Joe Apikotoa (Tonga)	16	2				10	04/03/2022	03/06/2023
2	Levi Aumua (Fiji) / (Samoa)	22	8				40	04/03/2022	03/06/2023
3	Ere Enari (Samoa)	33						04/03/2022	04/05/2024
4	Tima Fainga'anuku (Tonga)	14	4				20	04/03/2022	03/06/2023
5	Neria Fomai (Samoa)	17	2				10	04/03/2022	25/05/2024
6	Solomone Funaki (Tonga)	24	7				35	04/03/2022	04/05/2024
7	William Havili (Tonga)	61	10	28	15		151	04/03/2022	30/05/2026
8	Fine Inisi (Tonga)	35	11				55	04/03/2022	26/04/2025
9	Sekope Kepu (Tonga)	22	2				10	04/03/2022	31/05/2024
10	Tau Koloamatangi (Tonga)	10	1				5	04/03/2022	13/05/2023
11	Jack Lam (Samoa)	6						04/03/2022	20/05/2022
12	Christian Leali'ifano (Samoa)	30	3	40	17		146	04/03/2022	31/05/2024
13	Ezekiel Lindenmuth (Samoa)	25	2				10	04/03/2022	03/06/2023
14	Lincoln McClutchie (Māori people)	20		23	4		58	04/03/2022	03/06/2023
15	Mike McKee (Cook Islands)	14						04/03/2022	03/06/2023
16	Alex McRobbie (Niue)	17	1				5	04/03/2022	19/05/2023
17	Sam Moli (Tonga)	48	5				25	04/03/2022	17/04/2026
18	Alamanda Motuga (Samoa)	23	4				20	04/03/2022	29/03/2025
19	Sam Slade (Samoa)	29						04/03/2022	31/05/2025
20	Henry Stowers (Samoa)	10	2				10	04/03/2022	28/05/2022
21	Jonathan Taumateine (Samoa)	37	1				5	04/03/2022	26/04/2026
22	Danny Toala (Samoa)	40	7				35	04/03/2022	24/05/2025
23	Luteru Tolai (Samoa)	19	2				10	04/03/2022	03/06/2023
24	Josh Kaifa (Tonga)	4						19/03/2022	16/04/2022
25	Sione Tuipulotu (Tonga) / (Samoa)	12	1				5	19/03/2022	13/05/2023
26	Ray Niuia (Samoa)	12						25/03/2022	29/04/2023
27	Manu Paea (Tonga)	12						25/03/2022	14/04/2023
28	Veikoso Poloniati (Tonga)	18						25/03/2022	30/05/2026
29	Henry Taefu (Samoa)	25	3				15	25/03/2022	31/05/2024
30	Nigel Ah Wong (Samoa)	11	1				5	29/03/2022	31/05/2024
31	Tomasi Alosio (Samoa)	4	2				10	29/03/2022	13/05/2023
32	Chris Apoua (Samoa)	33	2				10	29/03/2022	02/05/2026
33	Suetena Asomua (Samoa)	12						29/03/2022	31/05/2024
34	Xavier Cowley-Tuioti (Samoa)	1						29/03/2022	29/03/2022
35	Michael Curry (Samoa)	21	2				10	29/03/2022	19/04/2025
36	Penitoa Finau (Tonga)	7						29/03/2022	03/06/2023
37	Solomone Kata (Tonga)	7	1				5	29/03/2022	28/05/2022
38	D'Angelo Leuila (Samoa)	10		4	1		11	29/03/2022	10/05/2024
39	Dwayne Polataivao (Samoa)	2						29/03/2022	02/04/2022
40	Abraham Pole (Tonga)	59	13				65	29/03/2022	30/05/2026
41	Joe Royal (Māori people)	2						29/03/2022	13/05/2023
42	Anzelo Tuitavuki (Tonga)	12	3				15	29/03/2022	17/05/2024
43	Lolagi Visinia (Samoa)	5						29/03/2022	13/05/2023
44	Mahonri Ngakuru (Tonga)	9						02/04/2022	27/05/2023
45	Timoci Tavatavanawai (Fiji)	20	7				35	02/04/2022	03/06/2023
46	Niko Jones (Samoa)	7	1				5	16/04/2022	11/04/2026
47	Lotu Inisi (Tonga)	20	3				15	28/05/2022	31/05/2025
48	Jonah Mau'u (Samoa)	10						25/02/2023	27/05/2023
49	Miracle Faiʻilagi (Samoa)	44	18				90	04/03/2023	30/05/2026
50	Isi Tuʻungafasi (Tonga)	7						04/03/2023	13/05/2023
51	Potu Leavasa Jr. (Samoa)	6						11/03/2023	19/05/2023
52	Sam Wye (Fiji)	1						13/05/2023	13/05/2023
53	Donald Brighouse (Samoa)	4						24/02/2024	10/05/2024
54	Allan Craig	37	4				20	24/02/2024	30/05/2026
55	Viliami Fine (Tonga)	6						24/02/2024	04/05/2024
56	Aisea Halo (Tonga)	9						24/02/2024	12/04/2025
57	James Lay (Samoa)	6						24/02/2024	12/04/2025
58	Sione Mafileo (Tonga)	16	3				15	24/02/2024	19/04/2025
59	Sama Malolo (Samoa)	18	3				15	24/02/2024	19/04/2025
60	Jacob Norris (Māori people)	12	1				5	24/02/2024	31/05/2024
61	Pepesana Patafilo (Samoa)	18	3				15	24/02/2024	31/05/2025
62	Tom Savage	35						24/02/2024	26/04/2026
63	Julian Savea (Samoa)	19	3				15	24/02/2024	21/03/2026
64	Sione Havili Talitui (Tonga)	16	2				10	02/03/2024	17/05/2025
65	Sateki Latu (Tonga)	7						02/03/2024	04/05/2024
66	Irie Papuni (Tonga)	7						02/03/2024	10/05/2024
67	Ola Tauelangi (Tonga)	24						02/03/2024	26/04/2026
68	Kyren Taumoefolau (Tonga)	21	12				60	02/03/2024	31/05/2025
69	Tomasi Maka (Tonga)	7						08/03/2024	04/05/2025
70	Melani Matavao (Samoa)	22	6				30	08/03/2024	30/05/2026
71	Semisi Paea (Tonga)	19						22/03/2024	30/05/2026
72	Otumaka Mausia (Tonga)	2		1			2	06/04/2024	10/05/2024
73	Siaosi Nginingini (Tonga)	9	1				5	10/05/2024	23/05/2026
74	Tevita Langi (Tonga)	2						17/05/2024	25/05/2024
75	Ivan Fepuleai (Samoa)	1						31/05/2024	31/05/2024
76	Solomon Alaimalo (Samoa)	19	2				10	15/02/2025	30/05/2026
77	Jackson Garden-Bachop (Cook Islands) / (Samoa)	19	1	9		1	26	15/02/2025	09/05/2026
78	Lalomilo Lalomilo (Samoa)	17	1				5	15/02/2025	26/04/2026
79	Feleti Sae-Taʻufoʻou (Tonga)	13	3				15	15/02/2025	27/03/2026
80	Mills Sanerivi (Samoa)	26	6				30	15/02/2025	30/05/2026
81	Ardie Savea (Samoa)	12	7				35	15/02/2025	31/05/2025
82	Tito Tuipulotu (Samoa)	15						15/02/2025	21/03/2026
83	Semisi Tupou Ta'eiloa (Tonga)	25	11				55	15/02/2025	30/05/2026
84	Losi Filipo (Samoa)	2						22/02/2025	21/03/2025
85	Patrick Pellegrini (Tonga)	24	5	47	6		137	28/02/2025	30/05/2026
86	Tevita Ofa (Samoa) / (Tonga)	17	4				20	28/02/2025	27/03/2026
87	Tuna Tuitama (Samoa)	9	4				20	21/03/2025	30/05/2026
88	Monu Moli (Tonga)	3						19/04/2025	04/05/2025
89	Ofa Tauatevalu (Tonga)	3	1				5	04/05/2025	06/03/2026
90	Pone Fa'amausili (Samoa)	1						04/05/2025	04/05/2025
91	Ngani Laumape (Tonga)	4						14/02/2026	15/03/2026
92	Dominic Ropeti (Samoa)	6						14/02/2026	23/05/2026
93	Glen Vaihu (Tonga)	13	2				10	14/02/2026	30/05/2026
94	Denzel Samoa	2						14/02/2026	27/02/2026
95	Alefosio Aho (Tonga)	4						20/02/2026	30/05/2026
96	Israel Leota (Samoa)	6	3				15	20/02/2026	30/05/2026
97	Faletoi Peni (Samoa)	7						20/02/2026	30/05/2026
98	Konrad Toleafoa (Samoa)	1						20/02/2026	20/02/2026
99	Simon-Peter Toleafoa (Samoa) / (Tonga)	1						20/02/2026	20/02/2026
100	Lolani Faleiva (Samoa)	5						20/02/2026	09/05/2026
101	Mamoru Harada	8						20/02/2026	30/05/2026
102	Sam Tuitupou (Tonga)	3						20/02/2026	30/05/2026
103	Tupou Afungia (Tonga)	1						27/02/2026	27/02/2026
104	Tevita Latu (Tonga)	12						27/02/2026	30/05/2026
105	Malakai Hala-Ngatai (Tonga)	10						27/02/2026	30/05/2026
106	Augustine Pulu (Tonga)	8	2				10	06/03/2026	30/05/2026
107	Joel Lam (Samoa)	4	1				5	06/03/2026	27/03/2026
108	Tyler Pulini (Tonga)	4						06/03/2026	23/05/2026
109	Atu Moli (Tonga)	7						15/03/2026	30/05/2026
110	Paula Latu (Tonga)	6						27/03/2026	30/05/2026
111	Jimmy Tupou (Tonga)	5						11/04/2026	09/05/2026
