= Sky Sport (Italy) =

Italian TV channel

- Logo used since 2026
- Country: Italy
- Broadcast area: Italy; Vatican City; San Marino

Programming
- Language: Italian
- Picture format: 576i (16:9 SDTV); 1080i (HDTV); 2160p (UHDTV)

Ownership
- Owner: Sky Italia

History
- Launched: July 31, 2003

Links
- Website: sport.sky.it

Sky Sport is a group of nine sports satellite and IPTV TV channels in the Italian language produced and broadcast by Sky Italia.

== Channels ==
Sky Sport manages 14 continuative channels, of which 12 are available for all subscribers. Sky Sport 4K and Sky Sport Business’s channels are available only for users with a UHD option active and the other one for business subscription.

The Sky Sport Calcio channel is available only on the Sky Calcio package and on the NOW Sports pass.

EPG	Logo	Channel name	Main Contents	Launch
200, 250, 503		Sky Sport 24	News across all of sport	August 30, 2008
201		Sky Sport Uno	Flagship events	July 31, 2003
202, 249		Sky Sport Calcio	Serie A • Serie C • European league football	August 24, 2021
203		Sky Sport Tennis	Wimbledon • US Open • ATP Tour • WTA Tour	June 28, 2021
204		Sky Sport Arena	Alternative sports (rugby, athletics, baseball, volleyball)	July 31, 2003
205		Sky Sport Basket	NBA • EuroLeague • LBA	July 1, 2025
206		Sky Sport Max	General sports	September 4, 2023
207		Sky Sport F1	Formula One • Formula 2 • Formula 3 • IndyCar Series	February 18, 2013
208		Sky Sport MotoGP	MotoGP (incl. Moto2, Moto3, MotoE) • WorldSBK	March 10, 2014
209		Sky Sport Golf	Golf events	January 12, 2023
210		Sky Sport Legend	Classic sporting events and documentary shows	June 30, 2025
211		Sky Sport Mix	General sports	July 1, 2025
213		Sky Sport 4K	4K feed of selected events	August 20, 2021
215		Sky Sport Business 1	Flagship events • Serie A	August 21, 2021
216		Sky Sport Business 2	Serie A	August 21, 2021
251-259		Sky Sport	Serie A • Champions League • Europa League • Conference League • WorldSBK • Minor events	July 31, 2003

• The Sky Sport channels starting from 251(to 259) don't always have an event and are accessible depending time to time for the Sky Sport and Sky Calcio packadges. They are the new version of the Sky Calcio channels.

•The channel “Prime Video Sportsbar” may also be included in the Sky Sport package for business venues.

== Programming rights ==
=== Athletics ===
- Diamond League (excluding the Golden Gala, until 2025)
- World Athletics Continental Tour (all Gold events exclusively)

=== Baseball ===
- MLB (up to 7 games per week during the regular season, All-Star Game, major postseason games, and all World Series games live non-exclusively through 2026)

=== Basketball ===
- FIBA World Cup 2027 (non-exclusive live qualifying and finals)
- FIBA Women's World Cup 2026 (non-exclusive live qualifying and finals)
- FIBA EuroBasket 2025 (non-exclusive live coverage of the qualifiers and finals)
- Women's Eurobasket 2025 (non-exclusive live coverage of the qualifiers and finals)
- EuroLeague (main matches live non-exclusively until the 2024/2025 season and live exclusively until the 2027/2028 season)
- EuroCup Basketball (main matches live non-exclusively until the 2024/2025 season and live exclusively until the 2027/2028 season)
- Serie A (men's basketball) (two games per gameday until 2028, always the big game of the day; two games per gameday of the playoff quarterfinals; all semifinals and all finals)
- Supercoppa Italiana (all games until 2028)
- NBA (until 2026, at least seven games per week during the regular season, all All-Star Weekend events, key playoff games, and all Finals games live exclusively)
- WNBA

=== Football ===
==== Italian ====
- Serie A (3 matches per round in co-exclusive, for a total of 114 matches out of 380 seasonal matches until the 2028/2029 season)
- Serie C (1,143 national exclusive matches and 48 co-exclusive matches per season with regular season, play-offs, play-outs, Coppa Italia Serie C from the round of 16 to the final and Supercoppa Serie C until the 2027/2028 season)
- Coppa Italia (women's football) (until 2027)
- Italian Super Cup (women's football) (until 2027)

==== European ====
- UEFA Champions League (185 exclusive matches out of 203 per season from 2024/2025 to 2030/2031)
- UEFA Europa League (all matches exclusively until the 2030/2031 season, also thanks to Diretta Gol)
- UEFA Conference League (all matches exclusively until the 2030/2031 season, also thanks to Diretta Gol)
- UEFA Super Cup (exclusive until the 2030/2031 season)
- UEFA Youth League (key matches from the 2024/25, 2025/26 and 2030/31 seasons, live and exclusive)

==== English ====
- Premier League (up to seven matches per round until the 2024/2025 season exclusively and up to ten matches per round, including Friday and Monday nights, exclusively until 2027/2028)
- Women's Super League

==== German ====
- Bundesliga (up to five matches per round exclusively until the 2028/2029 season)
- 2.Bundesliga (two exclusive matches per round)
- DFL-Supercup (exclusive until 2028)

==== International ====
- UEFA Euro 2028 (all 51 matches live, including exclusive coverage for 24 matches)
- European Qualifiers (all matches live with the exception for Italy national team)

=== Futsal ===
- UEFA Futsal Champions League (final four only until 2026-27)

=== Golf ===
- Italian Open
- The Masters Tournament
- US Open
- PGA Championship
- The Open Championship (until 2024)
- DP World Tour (all tournaments exclusive until 2025)
- World Golf Championships (all tournaments exclusive until 2025)
- TGL (exclusive until 2026)
- Ryder Cup

=== Judo ===
- World Judo Championships

=== Motorsports ===
- Formula 1 (free practice sessions of all Grand Prix races, exclusively live, qualifying and the race of the Italian GP and 4 other Grand Prix races, non-exclusively live, and the remaining Grand Prix races, exclusively live until 2032)
- FIA F2 Championship (free practice, qualifying and races of all Grand Prix races live and exclusive until 2027)
- FIA F3 Championship (until 2027, free practice, qualifying and races of all Grand Prix events live and exclusive)
- MotoGP (free practice and warm-ups of all Grand Prix races live exclusively, qualifying and race of the Italian GP and 5 other GPs live non-exclusively and of the remaining Grand Prix races live exclusively until 2025)
- Moto2 (free practice and warm-ups of all Grand Prix races live, exclusively live, qualifying and race of the Italian GP and 5 other GPs live, non-exclusively live, and the remaining Grand Prix races live exclusively until 2025)
- Moto3 (free practice and warm-ups of all Grand Prix races live, exclusively live, qualifying and race of the Italian GP and 5 other GPs live, non-exclusively live, and the remaining Grand Prix races live exclusively until 2025)
- Porsche Mobil 1 Supercup (free practice, qualifying, and races of all Grand Prix races live and exclusively until 2027)
- NTT IndyCar Series (all Grand Prix races live and exclusive through 2025)
- SBK (free practice, qualifying, Superpole and races of all Grand Prix races live and exclusively until 2025)
- Supersport (free practice, qualifying, Superpole and races of all Grand Prix races live and exclusively until 2025)
- Supersport 300 (free practice, qualifying, Superpole and races of all Grand Prix races live and exclusively until 2025)

=== Swimming ===
- 2025 World Aquatics Championships

=== Padel ===
- Premier Padel (until 2026)

=== Handball ===
- 2025 World Men's Handball Championship (Italy matches live, exclusive coverage)

=== Volleyball ===
- CEV Champions League (men) (live non-exclusive until 2026)
- CEV Champions League (women) (live non-exclusive until 2026)

=== Rugby ===
- Six Nations Championship(all matches live and exclusive)
- Six Nations Under 20s Championship (all matches live and exclusive until 2025)
- Women's Six Nations Championship (all matches live, exclusive until 2025)
- Currie Cup (semi-finals and final, live exclusive)
- National Provincial Championship (exclusive live final)
- The Rugby Championship(all matches live and exclusive until 2025)
- Super Rugby (main matches live exclusively until 2025)
- Autumn Nations Series (all Test matches live and exclusive until 2025)
- United Rugby Championship (all Benetton Treviso and Zebre matches and the big matches of the day, live and exclusive until 2025)

=== Fencing ===
- European Fencing Championship 2025
- 2025 World Fencing Championship

=== Tennis ===
- Wimbledon (exclusive until 2030)
- ATP Tour (all Masters 1000, 500 and 250 tournaments, all ATP Finals and NextGenATP Finals matches live and exclusively broadcast until 2028)
- WTA Tour(all WTA1000, WTA500 and WTA250 tournaments, all WTA Finals and WTA Elite Trophy matches live and exclusively until 2028)
- US Open (until 2027 thanks to the agreement with SuperTennis)

=== Sail ===
- America's Cup
- Sail GP
