= UEFA European Qualifiers =

UEFA European Qualifiers (French: UEFA Éliminatoires européens, German: UEFA Europäische Qualifikationsspiele) are the qualifying matches for the UEFA qualification matches as a part of the FIFA World Cup and the UEFA European Championship, trademarked from 2016. For details:

- FIFA World Cup qualifiers
- UEFA European Championship qualifying
