= UEFA European Championship qualifying =

- Founded: 1958
- Region: Europe (UEFA)
- Teams: 55 (currently eligible); 56 (overall)
- Qualifier for: UEFA European Championship
- Related competitions: UEFA Nations League
- Website: Official website
- UEFA Euro 2028 qualifying

The UEFA European Championship qualifying, branded as the European Qualifiers, is the process that UEFA-affiliated national football teams go through in order to qualify for the UEFA European Championship. In this article, the years represent the final tournaments of the European Championship and are not meant to correspond to the actual dates when the qualification matches were played.

== Format evolution ==
Qualifying groups
Year	Groups	Teams
1960	—	—
1964	—	—
1968	8	3–4
1972	8	4
1976	8	4
1980	7	4–5
1984	7	4–5
1988	7	4–5
1992	7	4–5
1996	8	5–6
2000	9	5–6
2004	10	5
2008	7	7–8
2012	9	5–6
2016	9	5–6
2020	10	5–6
2024	10	5–6
2028	12	4–5

=== Pre-2000 ===
The 1960 and 1964 qualifications were knock-out tournaments. The four quarter-final-winning teams qualified for the final stages, and one of them was chosen to host the competition.

From 1968 onwards, a group stage began to be used as the main, or sole, component of qualification. In 1968, 1972 and 1976, the winners of the eight groups advanced to a quarter-final stage, which was still part of the qualifying. The four quarter-final winners progressed to the finals. Again, the host nation was selected among the four finalists.

From 1980, the hosting rights would be assigned in advance, and the host teams would be guaranteed automatic qualification. The format of the finals was expanded to feature eight teams. Winners of qualifying groups now proceeded to the finals directly. The 1980, 1984, 1988, and 1992 qualifications included seven groups – the winners of which would join the hosts in the finals. However, in 1992, one winner was eventually banned from appearing and replaced by the runner-up of its group. (Note: As group winner, Yugoslavia qualified for Euro 1992 (where it was going to compete as FR Yugoslavia), but was banned from participating as the country was placed under international sanctions because of the Yugoslav Wars. The spot was offered to Denmark, which as group runner-up had originally failed to qualify. In this article, the 1992 tournament was treated as successful for Yugoslavia and unsuccessful for Denmark.)

From 1996, a 16-team format was employed for the main tournament. Runners-up in qualifying groups now could also gain access to the finals. Play-off pairings were introduced as a second opportunity for teams that narrowly miss out on direct qualification. The 1996 qualifying consisted of eight groups: The group winners as well as the six best runners-up qualified, so did the winner of the play-off between the remaining two runners-up, joining the host country.

=== 2000s ===
In 2000, the first-placed teams in the nine qualifying groups as well as the best runner-up progressed directly to the finals, while another four spots were taken by winners of play-offs contested by the remaining runners-up. For the first time, there were two host countries who both received automatic berths in the finals.

In 2004, along with the host team, the ten qualifying group winners advanced, as did the winners of the five play-off ties formed by the runners-up.

In 2008, the top two teams from each of the seven qualifying groups joined the two host teams to bring the number of finalists to 16. No play-off stage was held.

The 2012 qualification replicated the format of that of 2000: places were taken by nine group winners and the best runner-up, while the other runners-up determined four more finalists via play-offs, with the two host countries qualifying by default.

Starting from 2016, the finals format was expanded again, now featuring 24 teams. It became possible for third-placed teams in qualifying groups to get to the Euros too. The 2016 qualifying included nine groups; the winners, the runners-up, and the best third-placed team advanced directly, while play-offs played by the other third-placed teams determined the last four finalists. The host nation still qualified automatically. The 2016 qualification tournament was the first one to be branded as the European Qualifiers, a trademark used from that point on for both the European Championship qualifications and the FIFA World Cup qualification tournaments in Europe.

=== 2020s–present ===
From 2020, qualification began to be linked with the newly created UEFA Nations League: participation in the qualifying play-offs was now determined based on the teams' performances in that competition and not in qualification itself. The play-offs themselves were restructured into four-team brackets consisting of semi-finals and a final. In the UEFA Euro 2020 qualifying, the top two teams of the ten qualifying groups took twenty places in the main tournament. From each of the four divisions of the 2018–19 UEFA Nations League, the four best-ranked teams that were not yet qualified for Euro 2020 filled in a play-off bracket for that division, and the winner of each bracket got a spot in the Euros as well. There were no automatic berths for Euro 2020 as it was hosted by multiple cities across the continent. However, the tournament was postponed until 2021 due to the COVID-19 pandemic, but retained its original branding.

Much like the 2020 tournament, the 2024 qualifying granted spots to the winners and runners-up of the ten qualifying groups, while this time only the top three divisions of the 2022–23 Nations League formed play-off brackets to determine three more finalists, and the host country got an automatic spot.

For 2028, the number of groups will be increased to twelve. The winners will advance to the finals, while the runners-up will either also advance directly or participate in play-offs. The four hosts will join the qualfiying group stage, and the top two host teams that do not qualify directly through the group stage will receive automatic qualification berths, if available. The number of teams advancing via play-offs depends on how many host slots are used. The play-off slots will be filled with 2–4 remaining group runners-up and 4–9 teams through the 2026–27 Nations League. If both host berths are used, eight teams will compete in two four-team play-off paths, with the winner of each advancing to Euro 2028. If three hosts qualify directly to the finals and only one host receives the automatic berth, twelve teams will compete in three four-team play-off paths. If all four hosts qualify directly, four home-and-away two-legged ties between a group runner-up and a team qualified through the Nations League will be played.

=== Number of teams entering ===
	(France) 1960	(Spain) 1964	(Italy) 1968	(Belgium) 1972	(Socialist Federal Republic of Yugoslavia) 1976	(Italy) 1980	(France) 1984	(West Germany) 1988	(Sweden) 1992	(England) 1996	(Belgium) (Netherlands) 2000	(Portugal) 2004	(Austria) (Switzerland) 2008	(Poland) (Ukraine) 2012	(France) 2016	(Europe) 2020	(Germany) 2024	(England) (Republic of Ireland) (Scotland) (Wales) 2028	(Italy) (Turkey) 2032
Total valid entries (Note: Data is about qualifications only (automatic qualifiers are not counted).)	17	29	31	32	32	31	32	32	34	47	49	50	50	51	53	55	53		
Played at least one match	17	28	31	32	32	31	32	32	33	47	49	50	50	51	53	55	53		
Qualified through qualification	4	4	4	4	4	7	7	7	7	15	14	15	14	14	23	24	23		
Qualified automatically	0	0	0	0	0	1	1	1	1	1	2	1	2	2	1	0	1	0–2 (Note: Automatic qualification berths will be awarded after the qualifying group stage.)	2
Total finalists	4	4	4	4	4	8	8	8	8	16	16	16	16	16	24	24	24	24	

== Participating teams ==
National teams that are members of UEFA are eligible to enter the European Championship qualification. A total of 56 distinct entities have made attempts to qualify for the European Championship. Of those, 55 are still active in the competition as of 2024. Due to political changes, a few of the entities have appeared under multiple incarnations (see the footnotes to the below table). For instance, the East Germany team has defunct since the German reunification on 3 October 1990.

Saarland, a former UEFA member, merged into West Germany in 1957. As a result, they did not enter the qualifiers of any European Championships.

Year	Debuting teams			Successor teams	Renamed teams
Year	Teams	No.	CT	Successor teams	Renamed teams
1960	Austria, Bulgaria, Czechoslovakia, (Note: As recognised by UEFA, the Czech Republic and Slovakia are considered equal successors of Czechoslovakia from the 1996 qualification.) Denmark, East Germany, (Note: East Germany has competed as part of the reunited Germany since the 1992 qualification.) France, Greece, Hungary, Norway, Poland, Portugal, Republic of Ireland, Romania, Soviet Union, (Note: The Soviet Union was succeeded and replaced for the 1992 finals by the provisional Commonwealth of Independent States team, which also was succeeded by Russia from the 1996 qualification.) Spain, Turkey, Yugoslavia (Note: Yugoslavia was succeeded from the 2000 qualification by FR Yugoslavia / Serbia and Montenegro, which also was succeeded by Serbia from the 2008 qualification.)	17	17		
1964	Albania, Belgium, England, Iceland, Italy, Luxembourg, Malta, Netherlands, Northern Ireland, Sweden, Switzerland, Wales	12	29		
1968	Cyprus, Finland, Scotland, West Germany (Note: West Germany was succeeded by the reunified Germany from the 1992 qualification.)	4	33		
1972		0	33		
1976		0	33		
1980		0	33		
1984		0	33		
1988		0	33		
1992	Faroe Islands, San Marino	2	35	Germany	
1996	Armenia, (Note: Armenia, Azerbaijan, Belarus, Estonia, Georgia, Kazakhstan, Latvia, Lithuania, Moldova, and Ukraine competed as parts of the Soviet Union from 1960 to 1992. All of them except Estonia, Latvia, and Lithuania also competed in the 1992 finals as parts of the Commonwealth of Independent States.) Azerbaijan, Belarus, Croatia, (Note: Bosnia and Herzegovina, Croatia, Kosovo, Macedonia, Montenegro, and Slovenia competed as parts of Yugoslavia from 1960 to 1992. Kosovo and Montenegro competed as parts of FR Yugoslavia/Serbia and Montenegro from 2000 to 2004. Kosovo competed as part of Serbia in 2008, before breaking off from it and eventually being admitted to UEFA.) Estonia, Georgia, Israel, Latvia, Liechtenstein, Lithuania, Macedonia, (Note: Macedonia was renamed as North Macedonia from the 2020 qualification.) Moldova, Slovenia, Ukraine	15 (Note: Given that UEFA recognises the Czech Republic and Slovakia as equal successors of Czechoslovakia, neither team is considered to have debuted outright under its current incarnation. However, they are separate entities and counted accordingly, bringing the cumulative total number of participants to 50 as of 1996 (and 56 as of 2024).)	50	Czech Republic, Russia, Slovakia	
2000	Andorra, Bosnia and Herzegovina	2	52	FR Yugoslavia (Note: FR Yugoslavia was renamed as Serbia and Montenegro during the 2004 qualification.)	
2004		0	52		Serbia and Montenegro
2008	Kazakhstan	1	53	Serbia	
2012	Montenegro	1	54		
2016	Gibraltar	1	55		
2020	Kosovo	1	56		North Macedonia
2024		0	56		

Successor teams inheriting the records of former teams

Teams competing as parts of other teams

Renamed teams

Other notes

== Overview ==
Team	1960	1964	1968	1972	1976	1980	1984	1988	1992	1996	2000	2004	2008	2012	2016	2020	2024	2028	2032
Albania	—	r16	3/3	4/4	—	—	5/5	4/4	5/5	6/6	5/6	4/5	5/7	5/6	2/5	4/6	1/5		
Andorra											6/6	5/5	7/7	6/6	6/6	5/6	6/6		
Armenia										6/6	5/6	4/5	7/8	3/6	5/5	5/6	4/5		
Austria	QF	r16	3/4	2/4	3/4	2/5	3/5	3/4	4/5	4/6	3/5	3/5	Q_{host}	4/6	1/6	2/6	2/5		
Azerbaijan										6/6	5/6	5/5	8/8	5/6	5/6	5/5	4/5		
Belarus										4/6	5/5	5/5	4/7	4/6	4/6	4/5+p	4/6		
Belgium	—	pr	2/4	^{1/4}_{QW}	^{1/4}_{QF}	1/5	1/4	3/5	3/4	3/6	Q_{host}	3/5	5/8	3/6	1/6	1/6	1/5		
Bosnia and Herzegovina											3/6	4/5	4/7	2/6+p	3/6+p	4/6+p	5/6+p		
Bulgaria	r16	r16	^{1/4}_{QF}	2/4	3/4	4/5	3/4	2/5	4/5	2/6	4/5	1/5	3/7	5/5	4/6	4/5+p	5/5		
Croatia										1/6	3/5	2/5+p	1/7	2/6+p	2/6	1/5	2/5		
Cyprus		—	4/4	4/4	4/4	4/4	5/5	5/5	5/5	5/6	4/5	4/5	6/7	5/5	5/6	4/6	5/5		
Czech Republic (1996–); Czechoslovakia (1960–1992)	QW	pr	2/4	2/4	^{1/4}_{QW}	1/4	3/5	2/4	2/5	1/6	1/6	1/5	1/7	2/5+p	1/6	2/5	2/5		
Denmark	r16	QW	4/4	4/4	4/4	5/5	1/5	1/4	2/5_{inv}	2/6	2/5+p	1/5	4/7	1/5	3/5+p	2/5	1/5		
East Germany	r16	r16	2/4	3/4	2/4	3/5	3/4	2/5	w										
England	—	pr	^{1/4}_{QW}	^{1/4}_{QF}	2/4	1/5	2/5	1/4	1/4	Q_{host}	2/5+p	1/5	3/7	1/5	1/6	1/5	1/5		
Estonia										6/6	5/6	4/5	6/7	2/6+p	4/6	5/5	5/5+p		
Faroe Islands									5/5	5/6	6/6	5/5	7/7	6/6	5/6	5/6	5/5		
Finland	—	—	4/4	4/4	4/4	3/4	4/4	4/4	4/5	4/6	3/5	4/5	4/8	4/6	4/6	2/6	3/6+p		
France	QW	QF	^{1/4}_{QF}	3/4	3/4	2/4	Q_{host}	3/5	1/5	2/6	1/6	1/5	2/7	1/6	Q_{host}	1/6	1/5		
Georgia										3/6	6/6	5/5	6/7	5/6	5/6	4/5+p	3/5+p		
Germany (1992—); West Germany (1960–1988)	—	—	2/3	^{1/4}_{QW}	^{1/4}_{QW}	1/4	1/5	Q_{host}	1/4	1/6	1/5	1/5	2/7	1/6	1/6	1/5	Q_{host}		
Gibraltar															6/6	5/5	5/5		
Greece	r16	w	2/4	3/4	2/4	1/4	3/5	2/5	3/5	3/6	3/6	1/5	1/7	1/6	6/6	3/6	3/5+p		
Hungary	r16	QW	^{1/4}_{QF}	^{1/4}_{QW}	2/4	2/4	4/5	3/5	4/5	4/5	4/6	4/5	6/7	3/6	3/6+p	4/5+p	1/5		
Iceland	—	pr	—	—	4/4	5/5	4/5	4/5	4/5	5/5	4/6	3/5	6/7	4/5	2/6	3/6+p	4/6+p		
Israel										5/6	2/5+p	3/5	4/7	3/6	4/6	5/6+p	3/6+p		
Italy	—	r16	^{1/4}_{QW}	^{1/4}_{QF}	3/4	Q_{host}	4/5	1/5	2/5	2/6	1/5	1/5	1/7	1/6	1/6	1/6	2/5		Q_{host}
Kazakhstan													6/8	6/6	5/6	5/6	4/6+p		
Kosovo																3/5+p	5/6		
Latvia										5/6	4/6	2/5+p	5/7	4/6	6/6	6/6	5/5		
Liechtenstein						—	—	—	—	6/6	6/6	5/5	7/7	5/5	5/6	6/6	6/6		
Lithuania										3/6	4/6	4/5	5/7	4/5	5/6	5/5	4/5		
Luxembourg	—	QF	4/4	4/4	4/4	4/4	5/5	5/5	4/4	5/6	5/5	5/5	7/7	6/6	5/6	4/5	3/6+p		
Malta		pr	—	4/4	4/4	4/4	5/5	5/5	5/5	6/6	5/5	5/5	7/7	6/6	6/6	6/6	5/5		
Moldova										4/6	5/5	4/5	5/7	5/6	6/6	6/6	4/5		
Montenegro														2/5+p	4/6	5/5	3/5		
Netherlands	—	r16	3/4	2/4	^{1/4}_{QW}	1/5	2/5	1/5	1/5	2/6+p	Q_{host}	2/5+p	2/7	1/6	4/6	2/5	2/5		
North Macedonia (2020–); Macedonia (1996–2016)										4/6	4/5	4/5	5/7	5/6	6/6	3/6+p	4/5		
Northern Ireland	—	r16	4/4	3/4	2/4	2/5	2/5	3/4	3/5	3/6	4/5	5/5	3/7	5/6	1/6	3/5+p	5/6		
Norway	r16	pr	4/4	4/4	4/4	5/5	4/4	5/5	3/5	3/6	1/6	2/5+p	3/7	3/5	3/6+p	3/6+p	3/5		
Poland	r16	pr	3/4	2/4	2/4	2/5	3/4	4/5	3/4	4/6	3/5	3/5	1/8	Q_{host}	2/6	1/6	3/5+p		
Portugal	QF	pr	2/4	2/4	3/4	3/5	1/4	3/5	2/5	1/6	2/6	Q_{host}	2/8	2/5+p	1/5	2/5	1/6		
Republic of Ireland	pr	QF	3/4	4/4	2/4	3/5	3/5	1/5	2/4	2/6+p	2/5+p	3/5	3/7	2/6+p	3/6+p	3/5+p	4/5		
Romania	QF	pr	2/4	^{1/4}_{QF}	2/4	3/4	1/5	2/4	3/5	1/6	1/6	3/5	1/7	3/6	2/6	4/6+p	1/6		
Russia (1996–); Soviet Union (1960–1992)	QW	QW	^{1/4}_{QW}	^{1/4}_{QW}	^{1/4}_{QF}	4/4	2/4	1/5	1/5	1/6	3/6	2/5+p	2/7	1/6	2/6	2/6	s		
San Marino									5/5	6/6	5/5	5/5	7/7	6/6	6/6	6/6	6/6		
Scotland	—	—	2/4	3/4	3/4	4/5	4/4	4/5	1/5	2/6	2/6+p	2/5+p	3/7	3/5	4/6	3/6+p	2/5		
Serbia (2008–); Serbia and Montenegro (2004); FR Yugoslavia (1996–2004); Yugoslavia (1960–1992)	QW	r16	^{1/3}_{QW}	^{1/4}_{QF}	^{1/4}_{QW}	2/4	1/4	2/4	1/5_{dsq}	s	1/5	3/5	3/8	3/6	4/5	3/5+p	2/5		
Slovakia (1996–); Czechoslovakia (1960–1992)	QW	pr	2/4	2/4	^{1/4}_{QW}	1/4	3/5	2/4	2/5	3/6	3/6	3/5	4/7	4/6	2/6	3/5+p	2/5		
Slovenia										5/6	2/6+p	2/5+p	6/7	4/6	3/6+p	4/6	2/5		
Spain	QF	QW	^{1/4}_{QF}	2/4	^{1/4}_{QF}	1/4	1/5	1/4	3/5	1/6	1/5	2/5+p	1/7	1/5	1/6	1/6	1/5		
Sweden	—	QF	3/4	3/4	3/4	3/4	2/5	2/5	Q_{host}	3/5	1/5	1/5	2/7	2/6	3/6+p	2/6	3/5		
Switzerland	—	pr	3/4	2/4	4/4	4/5	2/4	4/5	2/5	1/5	3/5	1/5	Q_{host}	3/5	2/6	1/5	2/5		
Turkey	r16	pr	4/4	3/4	3/4	2/4	4/5	4/4	4/4	2/5	2/5+p	2/5+p	2/7	2/6+p	3/6	2/6	1/5		Q_{host}
Ukraine										4/6	2/6+p	3/5	4/7	Q_{host}	3/6+p	1/5	3/5+p		
Wales	—	pr	3/4	3/4	^{1/4}_{QF}	3/4	2/4	3/4	2/4	5/6	4/5	2/5+p	5/7	4/5	2/6	2/5	3/5+p		
Team	1960	1964	1968	1972	1976	1980	1984	1988	1992	1996	2000	2004	2008	2012	2016	2020	2024	2028	2032

Key

- golden background = successful qualifying campaign
- grey background = did not take part in qualifying
- bold red typeface = participated in the final tournament

X/Y	Came X-th in a group of Y teams.
X/Y+p	Came X-th in a group of Y teams, then qualified through a play-off round.
QW	Qualified as quarter-final winner
^{X/Y}_{QW}	Came X-th in a group of Y teams, then qualified as quarter-final winner.
X/Y_{dsq}	Qualified as X-th in a group of Y teams, but was banned from participating in the finals (Yugoslavia in 1992)
X/Y	Came X-th in a group of Y teams
X/Y+p	Came X-th in a group of Y teams, then was eliminated in a play-off round
X/Y_{inv}	Failed to qualify coming X-th in a group of Y teams, but was invited to the finals as a replacement (Denmark in 1992)
QF	Was eliminated in the quarter-finals
^{X/Y}_{QF}	Came X-th in a group of Y teams, then was eliminated in the quarter-finals.
r16	Was eliminated in the round of 16
pr	Was eliminated in the preliminary round
Q_{host}	Qualified automatically as host
w	Entered but withdrew before playing any matches (Greece in 1964 and East Germany in 1992)
s	Was suspended from taking part (Yugoslavia in 1996 and Russia in 2024)
—	Did not enter despite being a UEFA member
	Was not a UEFA member

== Team records ==
The below table compares the overall records of all teams that have participated in qualification. Teams are ordered by points using the three points for a win system, then by goal difference, and then by goals scored. Note that this order does not represent any official rankings, and qualification tournaments are not direct competitions between all teams.

The "Qualifying attempts" column only counts qualifying campaigns where the team played at least one match, while the "Appearances in the finals" also include automatic qualifiers.

As per statistical convention in football, matches decided in extra time are counted as wins and losses, while matches decided by penalty shoot-outs are counted as draws.

Legend
Team has qualified for the main tournament
Team has not qualified for the main tournament
Team is defunct (and never qualified for the main tournament)

Notes on the table:

- The 1992 qualifying attempt is treated as successful for Yugoslavia and unsuccessful for Denmark for the purposes of the table
- The Austria vs Greece match (1968 qualifying), which was declared void, is not taken into account.
- For the following matches, which were annulled and then replayed, only the replays are counted: Netherlands vs Cyprus (1988 qualifying) and Georgia vs Russia (2004 qualifying).
- For the following matches, where the scorelines were awarded, the awarded scorelines, rather than the original ones, are taken into account: Denmark vs Sweden (2008 qualifying), Italy vs Serbia (2012 qualifying), Serbia vs Albania (2016 qualifying), and Montenegro vs Russia (2016 qualifying).
- In the 2016 qualifying, Serbia was deducted 3 points and Croatia was deducted 1 point, which is reflected in the table.

The table is updated to the 2024 qualifying.

Rank (unoff.)	Team	Qualifying attempts		Appearances in the finals	Overall qualification record							Points	
Rank (unoff.)	Team	Total	Successful	Appearances in the finals	Pld	W	D	L	GF	GA	GD	Total	Avg
1	Spain	17	12	12	133	96	18	19	339	96	+243	306	2.301
2	Czech Republic; Czechoslovakia	17	11	11	132	85	24	23	263	108	+155	279	2.114
3	Russia; Soviet Union	16	12	12	130	81	29	20	268	94	+174	272	2.092
4	Italy	15	10	11	126	78	32	16	240	85	+155	266	2.111
5	Netherlands	15	10	11	125	83	16	26	291	99	+192	265	2.120
6	England	15	10	11	116	79	26	11	280	68	+212	263	2.267
7	Portugal	16	8	9	125	76	26	23	252	109	+143	254	2.032
8	France	15	9	11	120	74	28	18	260	94	+166	250	2.083
9	Germany; West Germany	13	12	14	106	76	20	10	267	68	+199	248	2.340
10	Romania	17	6	6	136	69	41	26	242	123	+119	248	1.824
11	Slovakia; Czechoslovakia	17	6	6	136	71	26	39	233	145	+88	239	1.757
12	Belgium	15	6	7	122	65	28	29	232	119	+113	223	1.828
13	Denmark	17	9	10	133	64	31	38	227	155	+72	223	1.677
14	Sweden	15	6	7	122	64	27	31	211	123	+88	219	1.795
15	Serbia; Serbia and Montenegro; FR Yugoslavia; Yugoslavia	16	7	6	122	64	30	28	221	137	+84	219	1.795
16	Hungary	17	5	5	139	63	29	47	226	181	+45	218	1.568
17	Scotland	15	4	4	130	62	30	38	200	147	+53	216	1.662
18	Republic of Ireland	17	3	3	138	55	41	42	199	151	+48	206	1.493
19	Greece	16	4	4	127	60	25	42	184	144	+40	205	1.614
20	Turkey	17	6	6	128	56	31	41	166	159	+7	199	1.555
21	Poland	16	3	4	118	55	30	33	192	125	+67	195	1.653
22	Austria	16	3	4	117	57	18	42	219	162	+57	189	1.615
23	Bulgaria	17	2	2	130	50	33	47	171	154	+17	183	1.408
24	Norway	17	1	1	133	50	27	56	181	183	−2	177	1.331
25	Switzerland	15	5	6	110	48	29	33	194	133	+61	173	1.573
26	Wales	16	2	2	120	48	26	46	145	149	−4	170	1.417
27	Northern Ireland	16	1	1	130	47	27	56	140	167	−27	168	1.292
28	Croatia	8	7	7	78	50	17	11	148	50	+98	166	2.128
29	Finland	15	1	1	124	39	24	61	143	182	−39	141	1.137
30	Slovenia	8	2	2	86	36	17	33	119	100	+19	125	1.453
31	Iceland	14	1	1	118	34	19	65	115	176	−61	121	1.025
32	Ukraine	7	2	3	70	33	19	18	101	65	+36	118	1.686
33	Israel	8	0	0	81	32	17	32	123	107	+16	113	1.395
34	Bosnia and Herzegovina	7	0	0	75	29	12	34	104	114	−10	99	1.320
35	Albania	14	2	2	109	24	26	59	100	177	−77	98	0.899
36	Latvia	8	1	1	80	22	13	45	75	135	−60	79	0.988
37	Georgia	8	1	1	78	21	12	45	83	119	−36	75	0.962
38	North Macedonia; Macedonia	8	1	1	78	19	18	41	84	124	−40	75	0.962
39	Lithuania	8	0	0	74	21	12	41	63	122	−59	75	1.014
40	East Germany	8	0	0	46	20	12	14	76	57	+19	72	1.565
41	Cyprus	15	0	0	122	19	15	88	101	316	−215	72	0.590
42	Belarus	8	0	0	77	18	16	43	62	118	−56	70	0.909
43	Armenia	8	0	0	76	17	15	44	74	121	−47	66	0.868
44	Moldova	8	0	0	76	14	13	49	62	150	−88	55	0.724
45	Estonia	8	0	0	78	15	10	53	51	151	−100	55	0.705
46	Luxembourg	16	0	0	127	13	13	101	64	338	−274	52	0.409
47	Kazakhstan	5	0	0	54	13	8	33	53	92	−39	47	0.870
48	Montenegro	4	0	0	36	9	10	17	29	56	−27	37	1.028
49	Azerbaijan	8	0	0	76	8	11	57	48	182	−134	35	0.461
50	Faroe Islands	9	0	0	86	7	8	71	46	225	−179	29	0.337
51	Malta	15	0	0	120	4	14	102	54	335	−281	26	0.217
52	Liechtenstein	8	0	0	78	5	9	64	22	235	−213	24	0.308
53	Kosovo	2	0	0	19	5	7	7	24	28	−4	22	1.158
54	Andorra	7	0	0	70	1	3	66	17	189	−172	6	0.086
55	San Marino	9	0	0	86	0	1	85	11	371	−360	1	0.012
56	Gibraltar	3	0	0	26	0	0	26	5	128	−123	0	0.000

== See also ==
- UEFA European Championship records and statistics
- FIFA World Cup qualification
- AFC Asian Cup qualification
- CONCACAF Gold Cup qualification
