= Levi Aumua =

- Born: 9 October 1994 (age 32) Auckland, New Zealand
- Height: 185 cm (6 ft 1 in)
- Weight: 111 kg (17 st 7 lb; 245 lb)

Rugby union career
- Position(s): Centre, Wing
- Current team: Canon Eagles
Senior career
Years	Team	Apps	(Points)
2014–2015	Bordeaux Bègles	2	(0)
2016–2017	Brisbane City		
2017–2019, 2021–2025	Tasman	74	(100)
2018	Chiefs	0	(0)
2019	Blues	4	(0)
2020	Hino Red Dolphins	0	(0)
2021–2022	Toyota Industries Shuttles	5	(15)
2021–2023	Moana Pasifika	22	(40)
2023–2025	Crusaders	20	(10)
2025–	Canon Eagles	13	(10)
- Correct as of 11 October 2025
International career
Years	Team	Apps	(Points)
2022–2023	All Blacks XV	1	(0)
- Correct as of 11 October 2025

Levi J. T. Aumua (born 9 October 1994) is a New Zealand rugby union player. His position is centre.

== Career ==
Aumua played 29 games for Tasman between 2017 and 2019 and was part of the Mako side that won the 2019 Mitre 10 Cup unbeaten. He was part of the Chiefs squad in 2018 but did not play before being named in the Blues squad for the 2019 Super Rugby season where he played 4 games. Aumua returned to Tasman for the 2021 Bunnings NPC after time playing in Japan. He signed with Moana Pasifika for the 2022 Super Rugby Pacific season. Tasman went on to make the final in 2021 before losing 23–20 to Waikato.

== Background ==
Aumua is of Samoan and Fijian heritage.

== Honours ==
- Runner-up in the National Provincial Championship with Tasman in 2017.
- Winner of the National Provincial Championship with Tasman in 2019.
- Winner of Super Rugby with the Crusaders in 2025.
