= Doug Philipson =

Australian rugby union player

- Full name: Douglas Philipson
- Born: 25 May 2004 (age 22) Australia
- Height: 172 cm (5 ft 8 in)
- Weight: 72 kg (159 lb; 11 st 5 lb)
- School: Barker College

Rugby union career
- Position: Scrum-half
- Current team: Force / Manawatu
Senior career
Years	Team	Apps	(Points)
2025–	Force	1	(0)
2026–	Manawatu	7	(5)
- Correct as of 12 September 2026
International career
Years	Team	Apps	(Points)
2024	Australia U20	3	(0)
- Correct as of 25 April 2025

Doug Philipson (born 25 May 2004) is a professional Australian rugby union player, who plays Super Rugby for the Force. He is currently playing for Manawatu in New Zealand's National Provincial Championship. His preferred position is scrum-half.

== Early career ==
Philipson grew up near Orange, New South Wales and attended Barker College. He played his club rugby for Northern Suburbs before moving to Western Australia. He was named in the Junior Wallabies side in 2024.

== Professional career ==
Philipson moved to the Force to join their academy in 2023, while also playing club rugby in Western Australia. He was then named in the Force squad for the 2025 Super Rugby Pacific season. He made his debut in the Round 11 match against the Chiefs, coming on as a replacement.

Philipson became one of ten Western Force players to sign for an NPC team in 2026. Signing for Manawatu, he made his debut in round 1 against Northland.
