= Lui Naeata =

Japanese rugby union player

- Full name: Taumua Lui Sanft Naeata
- Born: 2 February 1994 (age 32) Tonga
- Height: 1.93 m (6 ft 4 in)
- Weight: 118 kg (18 st 8 lb; 260 lb)
- School: Tonga College
- University: Ryutsu Keizai University

Rugby union career
- Position(s): Number 8, Flanker, Lock
Senior career
Years	Team	Apps	(Points)
2018–2021	Kobelco Steelers	25	(140)
2022	NTT DoCoMo Red Hurricanes	8	(20)
2022–2023	Toyota Industries Shuttles Aichi	7	(10)
2024	US Montauban	3	(5)
2024	Otago	3	(0)
2025	Highlanders	2	(0)
- Correct as of 7 November 2023
International career
Years	Team	Apps	(Points)
2013	Tonga U20	3	(0)
- Correct as of 7 November 2023

Lui Naeata (ナエアタ ルイ, Naeata Rui; born 2 February 1994 in Tonga) is a Japanese rugby union player, who most recently played as a flanker for Highlanders (rugby union) in the Super Rugby competition.

== Early life and career ==
Naeata was born in Tonga, where he received his secondary school education at Tonga College. He later moved to Japan where he attended Ryutsu Keizai University. He played four seasons for the university in the All-Japan University Rugby Championship (2014–2017).

== Senior career ==
On 1 March 2018, Kobe Steel Kobelco Steelers announced that the club had signed Naeata. He made his debut for the Kobelco Steelers (via the bench) on 29 September 2018 against Munakata Sanix Blues. He scored his first try for the club in his second of only two games that season, on 20 October 2018 against NEC Green Rockets.

Initially, Naeata played at lock for the club, but in 2020 he moved to number 8. One of his most remarkable games for Kobelco Steelers was a 97–0 thumping of NTT DoCoMo Red Hurricanes on 2 February 2020, in which he scored five tries. He repeated that feat the following season, when he scored five tries in the Kobelco Steelers' 73–10 win over Canon Eagles.

Naeata played four seasons for Kobelco Steelers, in which he played 25 games for the club and scored 28 tries.

NTT Docomo Red Hurricanes announced on 2 June 2021 that the club had signed Naeata. He played one season for the club, during which he played eight games and scored four tries.

On 1 November 2022, 2nd division club Toyota Industries Shuttles Aichi announced the signing of Naeata. His time with the club was again short-lived. After Shuttles Aichi failed to earn promotion to the first division, the club announced the departure of Naeata on 30 June 2023.

== International ==
In 2013, Naeata represented Tonga at the 2013 IRB Junior World Rugby Trophy in Chile. He played in Tonga's three pool matches, but missed their victorious fifth place play-off game against Portugal due to a suspension for a dangerous tackle.

In 2020, Naeata obtained Japanese citizenship. Having resided in Japan for over three years, he was eligible to represent his adopted country.

After playing four Top League seasons for Kobelco Steelers, Naeata was named in a 52-man Brave Blossoms training squad ahead of a test against the British and Irish Lions on 26 June 2021, but he didn't make the match day squad.

On 11 June 2022, he played for the Tonga Samurai Fifteen – a team made up of Tongan players living in Japan – against the Emerging Blossoms, a team consisting of players who are expected to represent Japan in the future. It was a charity match to support Tonga in the recovery from the devastating 2022 Hunga Tonga eruption and tsunami.
