= UEFA Euro 2028 qualifying =

Qualifier for UEFA Euro 2028

Tournament details
- Dates: 26 March 2027 – 28 March 2028
- Teams: 54 (expected)

The UEFA Euro 2028 qualifying tournament is an upcoming football competition that will determine the 24 UEFA member men's national teams in the UEFA Euro 2028 final tournament. The competition will be linked with the 2026–27 UEFA Nations League, giving countries a secondary route to qualify for the final tournament.

All UEFA member associations, except Russia who are suspended, may enter the qualifying process. This will be the last qualifying process to feature a group stage. Future European qualifiers, starting with those for the 2030 FIFA World Cup, will feature a two-tier qualification format, closely modelled after the new UEFA Champions League format.

== Format ==
Summary of qualifiers
Qualification method	Teams		
Direct qualifiers (12 group winners + 8 best-ranked runners-up)	20		
Direct qualifiers (12 group winners + 8 best-ranked runners-up)	Host nation involved:		
Direct qualifiers (12 group winners + 8 best-ranked runners-up)	0–2	3	4
Host nation slot to be used	2	1	0
Play-off winners	2	3	4
Total	24		

The national teams will be divided into twelve groups, with each group containing four or five teams. The group stage draw is expected to take place following the conclusion of the league phase of the 2026–27 UEFA Nations League (November 2026). Teams which have advanced to the quarter-finals of the UNL will be drawn into a group of four teams, since the quarter-finals of the UNL will take place simultaneously to matchdays 1 and 2, which will only be played by the five-team groups. The qualifying group stage will be played in a home-and-away round-robin format in 2027. Twenty teams will qualify directly for the final tournament: the twelve group winners, along with the eight best-ranked runners-up.

The host nations—England, Republic of Ireland, Scotland, and Wales—will participate in the qualifying group stage but will be drawn into separate groups. Two spots in the final tournament are reserved for the two best-ranked host nations (based on the overall qualifying group stage rankings) that fail to qualify as group winners or among the eight best runners-up.

The remaining spots (between two and four, depending on host nation qualification) will be determined through play-offs in March 2028. The play-offs will include the remaining runners-up from the qualifying groups (between two and four, depending on whether hosts are amongst these teams) and the best-ranked non-qualified group winners from the 2026–27 UEFA Nations League. The play-off structure depends on the number of host nation slots used:

- If both reserved host nation slots are used: Eight teams compete in two play-off paths, each with single-leg semi-finals and a final, for two final tournament spots. Teams are:
  - 2–4 of the worst group runners-up
  - 4–6 Nations League qualifiers
- If one reserved host nation slot is used: Twelve teams compete in three play-off paths, each with single-leg semi-finals and a final, for three final tournament spots. Teams are:
  - 8 or 9 Nations League qualifiers
  - 4 or 3 of the worst group runners-up
- If no reserved host nation slots are used: Eight teams (four via the Nations League) contest four home-and-away play-off ties, with the four winners qualifying for the final tournament. Teams are:
  - The 4 worst group runners-up
  - 4 Nations League qualifiers

=== Tiebreakers for group ranking ===
If two or more teams are equal on points on completion of the group matches, the following tie-breaking criteria are applied:

1. Higher number of points obtained in the matches played among the teams in question;
2. Superior goal difference in matches played among the teams in question;
3. Higher number of goals scored in the matches played among the teams in question;
4. If, after having applied criteria 1 to 3, teams still had an equal ranking, criteria 1 to 3 were reapplied exclusively to the matches between the teams in question to determine their final rankings. (Note: When there are two or more teams tied in points, criteria 1 to 3 are applied. After these criteria are applied, they may define the position of some of the teams involved, but not all of them. For example, if there is a three-way tie on points, the application of the first three criteria may only break the tie for one of the teams, leaving the other two teams still tied. In this case, the tiebreaking procedure is resumed, from the beginning, for those teams that are still tied.) If this procedure does not lead to a decision, criteria 5 to 11 apply;
5. Superior goal difference in all group matches;
6. Higher number of goals scored in all group matches;
7. Higher number of away goals scored in all group matches;
8. Higher number of wins in all group matches;
9. Higher number of away wins in all group matches;
10. Fair play conduct in all group matches (1 point for a single yellow card, 3 points for a red card as a consequence of two yellow cards, 3 points for a direct red card, 4 points for a yellow card followed by a direct red card);
11. Position in the UEFA Nations League interim overall ranking.

=== Criteria for overall ranking ===
To determine the overall rankings of the European Qualifiers, results against teams in fifth place are discarded and the following criteria are applied:

1. Position in the group;
2. Higher number of points;
3. Superior goal difference;
4. Higher number of goals scored;
5. Higher number of goals scored away from home;
6. Higher number of wins;
7. Higher number of wins away from home;
8. Fair play conduct (1 point for a single yellow card, 3 points for a red card as a consequence of two yellow cards, 3 points for a direct red card, 4 points for a yellow card followed by a direct red card);
9. Position in the UEFA Nations League interim overall ranking.

== Schedule ==
Below is the schedule of the UEFA Euro 2028 qualifying campaign.

Phase	Matchday		Dates
Phase	Groups of 4	Groups of 5	Dates
Qualifying group stage	—N/a	Matchday 1	26 March 2027
Qualifying group stage	—N/a	Matchday 2	29 March 2027
Qualifying group stage	—N/a	Matchday 3	11–12 June 2027
Qualifying group stage	—N/a	Matchday 4	14–15 June 2027
Qualifying group stage	Matchday 5		23–25 September 2027
Qualifying group stage	Matchday 6		26–28 September 2027
Qualifying group stage	Matchday 7		30 September – 2 October 2027
Qualifying group stage	Matchday 8		3–5 October 2027
Qualifying group stage	Matchday 9		11–13 November 2027
Qualifying group stage	Matchday 10		14–16 November 2027
Play-offs	Semi-finals		23–25 March 2028
Play-offs	Finals		26–28 March 2028

== Draw ==
The qualifying group stage draw will take place on 6 December 2026 in Belfast, Northern Ireland.

=== Draw conditions ===
Several conditions apply to the draw to accommodate the scheduling of the 2026–27 UEFA Nations League, separate certain national teams, and minimise the risk of matches being affected by severe winter weather or excessive travel distances.

- Competition-related restrictions: Due to the scheduling of the Nations League quarter-finals and promotion/relegation play-offs in March 2027, and the Nations League Finals in June 2027, the following restrictions apply:
  - The four winners of the Nations League quarter-finals must each be allocated to a different four-team group (Groups A–F), with placeholders used to represent the winners of each quarter-final tie.
  - Each five-team group (Groups G–L) may contain a maximum of one team participating in the Nations League promotion/relegation play-offs or one defeated Nations League quarter-finalist.
  - The six teams in Pot 5 must be allocated to the five-team groups (Groups G–L).
  - Since the identity of the Nations League quarter-finals participants is not known at the time of the draw, each quarter-final pairing will be identified once as "QFx winners" and once as "QFx defeated team", with the teams involved in each quarter-final pairing drawn into two different groups, and the final result of such pairing to decide which one of the two assigned groups is the team in question allocated to.
- Host nation restrictions: The four tournament hosts (England, Republic of Ireland, Scotland and Wales), together with Northern Ireland, must all be drawn into separate groups.
- Prohibited clashes: For political reasons, the following pairs of teams cannot be drawn into the same group:
  - Armenia / Azerbaijan
  - Belarus / Ukraine
  - Gibraltar / Spain
  - Kosovo / Bosnia and Herzegovina
  - Kosovo / Serbia
- Winter venue restrictions: A maximum of two teams identified as having a high or medium risk of severe winter conditions may be drawn into the same group. The seven teams concerned are Estonia, Faroe Islands, Finland, Iceland, Latvia, Lithuania and Norway. Belarus and Ukraine are not included in this list, as both teams are required to play their home matches at neutral venues until further notice.
- Excessive travel restrictions: To minimise travel distances, a maximum of one pairing identified as involving excessive travel may occur in each group. These pairings are defined as journeys of at least eight hours, calculated using direct flight times plus 90 minutes for ground operations. The following restrictions apply:
  - Kazakhstan with Andorra, England, France, Gibraltar, Iceland, Malta, Northern Ireland, Portugal, Republic of Ireland, Scotland, Spain or Wales.
  - Azerbaijan with Iceland or Portugal.
  - Iceland with Armenia or Cyprus.

For restrictions involving teams participating in the Nations League quarter-finals, the relevant restrictions also apply to their quarter-final pairings where specified.

The draw will be assisted by a computer to ensure that all conditions are satisfied. If a drawn team cannot be allocated to a particular group, or if its allocation would prevent the remaining teams from being drawn in accordance with the restrictions, the computer will assign it to the first available group in alphabetical order.

=== Seeding ===
As per the UEFA regulations, teams will be seeded based on their interim 2026–27 UEFA Nations League ranking. All host teams, as well as Northern Ireland, will be drawn into different groups to maximise their chances of qualifying directly for the final tournament. Draw conditions will also be in place for teams involved in either the Nations League quarter-finals or promotion/relegation play-offs, along with teams that are not allowed to be drawn into the same group for political or security reasons, as well as for teams that either have restrictions on playing matches at home during winter months or have excessive travel distances to certain venues.

Pot 1
QF	Team	Rank
1	France	3
1	Spain (title holders)	5
2	England (co-host)	1
2	Norway	8
3	Portugal	2
3	Netherlands	7
4	Germany	4
4	Belgium	6
—N/a	Greece	9
—N/a	Italy	10
—N/a	Denmark	11
—N/a	Croatia	12

Pot 2
Team	Rank
Wales (co-host)	13
Serbia	14
Turkey	15
Czech Republic	16
Switzerland	17
Sweden	18
Austria	19
Northern Ireland	20
Slovenia	21
Bosnia and Herzegovina	22
Hungary	23
Republic of Ireland (co-host)	24

Pot 3
Team	Rank
Ukraine	25
Scotland (co-host)	26
Kosovo	27
Poland	28
Israel	29
Romania	30
Georgia	31
North Macedonia	32
Montenegro	33
Albania	34
Iceland	35
Slovakia	36

Pot 4
Team	Rank
Estonia	37
Belarus	38
Faroe Islands	39
Cyprus	40
Finland	41
Moldova	42
Armenia	43
Bulgaria	44
Kazakhstan	45
Luxembourg	46
Latvia	47
San Marino	48

Pot 5
Team	Rank
Malta	49
Azerbaijan	50
Lithuania	51
Andorra	52
Gibraltar	53
Liechtenstein	54

Banned from entering qualifying
Team	Rank
Russia (TBC)	—N/a

1. ^{QF} Nations League quarter-finalist that will be unavailable during the March 2027 window
2. ^{PO} Nations League promotion/relegation play-offs participant that will be unavailable during the March 2027 window

== Groups ==
The groups of the qualification are:

=== Group A ===
Pos	Team	Pld	W	D	L	GF	GA	GD	Pts	Qualification
1	A1	0	0	0	0	0	0	0	0	Advance to UEFA Euro 2028
2	A2	0	0	0	0	0	0	0	0	Possible UEFA Euro 2028 based on ranking
3	A3	0	0	0	0	0	0	0	0	
4	A4	0	0	0	0	0	0	0	0	

First match(es) will be played: unknown. Source: UEFA

=== Group B ===
Pos	Team	Pld	W	D	L	GF	GA	GD	Pts	Qualification
1	B1	0	0	0	0	0	0	0	0	Advance to UEFA Euro 2028
2	B2	0	0	0	0	0	0	0	0	Possible UEFA Euro 2028 based on ranking
3	B3	0	0	0	0	0	0	0	0	
4	B4	0	0	0	0	0	0	0	0	

First match(es) will be played: unknown. Source: UEFA

=== Group C ===
Pos	Team	Pld	W	D	L	GF	GA	GD	Pts	Qualification
1	C1	0	0	0	0	0	0	0	0	Advance to UEFA Euro 2028
2	C2	0	0	0	0	0	0	0	0	Possible UEFA Euro 2028 based on ranking
3	C3	0	0	0	0	0	0	0	0	
4	C4	0	0	0	0	0	0	0	0	

First match(es) will be played: unknown. Source: UEFA

=== Group D ===
Pos	Team	Pld	W	D	L	GF	GA	GD	Pts	Qualification
1	D1	0	0	0	0	0	0	0	0	Advance to UEFA Euro 2028
2	D2	0	0	0	0	0	0	0	0	Possible UEFA Euro 2028 based on ranking
3	D3	0	0	0	0	0	0	0	0	
4	D4	0	0	0	0	0	0	0	0	

First match(es) will be played: unknown. Source: UEFA

=== Group E ===
Pos	Team	Pld	W	D	L	GF	GA	GD	Pts	Qualification
1	E1	0	0	0	0	0	0	0	0	Advance to UEFA Euro 2028
2	E2	0	0	0	0	0	0	0	0	Possible UEFA Euro 2028 based on ranking
3	E3	0	0	0	0	0	0	0	0	
4	E4	0	0	0	0	0	0	0	0	

First match(es) will be played: unknown. Source: UEFA

=== Group F ===
Pos	Team	Pld	W	D	L	GF	GA	GD	Pts	Qualification
1	F1	0	0	0	0	0	0	0	0	Advance to UEFA Euro 2028
2	F2	0	0	0	0	0	0	0	0	Possible UEFA Euro 2028 based on ranking
3	F3	0	0	0	0	0	0	0	0	
4	F4	0	0	0	0	0	0	0	0	

First match(es) will be played: unknown. Source: UEFA

=== Group G ===
Pos	Team	Pld	W	D	L	GF	GA	GD	Pts	Qualification
1	G1	0	0	0	0	0	0	0	0	Advance to UEFA Euro 2028
2	G2	0	0	0	0	0	0	0	0	Possible UEFA Euro 2028 based on ranking
3	G3	0	0	0	0	0	0	0	0	
4	G4	0	0	0	0	0	0	0	0	
5	G5	0	0	0	0	0	0	0	0	

First match(es) will be played: unknown. Source: UEFA

=== Group H ===
Pos	Team	Pld	W	D	L	GF	GA	GD	Pts	Qualification
1	H1	0	0	0	0	0	0	0	0	Advance to UEFA Euro 2028
2	H2	0	0	0	0	0	0	0	0	Possible UEFA Euro 2028 based on ranking
3	H3	0	0	0	0	0	0	0	0	
4	H4	0	0	0	0	0	0	0	0	
5	H5	0	0	0	0	0	0	0	0	

First match(es) will be played: unknown. Source: UEFA

=== Group I ===
Pos	Team	Pld	W	D	L	GF	GA	GD	Pts	Qualification
1	I1	0	0	0	0	0	0	0	0	Advance to UEFA Euro 2028
2	I2	0	0	0	0	0	0	0	0	Possible UEFA Euro 2028 based on ranking
3	I3	0	0	0	0	0	0	0	0	
4	I4	0	0	0	0	0	0	0	0	
5	I5	0	0	0	0	0	0	0	0	

First match(es) will be played: unknown. Source: UEFA

=== Group J ===
Pos	Team	Pld	W	D	L	GF	GA	GD	Pts	Qualification
1	J1	0	0	0	0	0	0	0	0	Advance to UEFA Euro 2028
2	J2	0	0	0	0	0	0	0	0	Possible UEFA Euro 2028 based on ranking
3	J3	0	0	0	0	0	0	0	0	
4	J4	0	0	0	0	0	0	0	0	
5	J5	0	0	0	0	0	0	0	0	

First match(es) will be played: unknown. Source: UEFA

=== Group K ===
Pos	Team	Pld	W	D	L	GF	GA	GD	Pts	Qualification
1	K1	0	0	0	0	0	0	0	0	Advance to UEFA Euro 2028
2	K2	0	0	0	0	0	0	0	0	Possible UEFA Euro 2028 based on ranking
3	K3	0	0	0	0	0	0	0	0	
4	K4	0	0	0	0	0	0	0	0	
5	K5	0	0	0	0	0	0	0	0	

First match(es) will be played: unknown. Source: UEFA

=== Group L ===
Pos	Team	Pld	W	D	L	GF	GA	GD	Pts	Qualification
1	L1	0	0	0	0	0	0	0	0	Advance to UEFA Euro 2028
2	L2	0	0	0	0	0	0	0	0	Possible UEFA Euro 2028 based on ranking
3	L3	0	0	0	0	0	0	0	0	
4	L4	0	0	0	0	0	0	0	0	
5	L5	0	0	0	0	0	0	0	0	

First match(es) will be played: unknown. Source: UEFA

=== Ranking of final tournament hosts ===
Two spots in the final tournament will be reserved for the host teams who failed to qualify directly from the group stage. If more than two host teams do not qualify directly, the two spots will be allocated to the hosts ranked highest in the European Qualifiers overall rankings. If only one or neither of the spots be used, the remaining spot(s) will be reallocated via the play-offs.

Pos	Grp	Team	Pld	W	D	L	GF	GA	GD	Pts
1		England	0	0	0	0	0	0	0	0
2		Republic of Ireland	0	0	0	0	0	0	0	0
3		Scotland	0	0	0	0	0	0	0	0
4		Wales	0	0	0	0	0	0	0	0

First match(es) will be played: March 2027. Source: UEFA
Rules for classification: Counting only matches against teams ranked first to fourth in the group, 1) Group position; 2) Points; 3) Goal difference; 4) Goals scored; 5) Away goals scored; 6) Wins; 7) Away wins; 8) Lower disciplinary points; 9) Higher position in the Nations League interim overall ranking.

=== Ranking of second-placed teams ===
Pos	Grp	Team	Pld	W	D	L	GF	GA	GD	Pts	Qualification (Note: Should a host team finish as one of the four worst second-placed teams, they could qualify directly for the final tournament via a host slot depending on their ranking amongst the other hosts. In this case, the unused play-off slot will be allocated to an additional team via the Nations League ranking.)
1	A	Second place Group A	0	0	0	0	0	0	0	0	Qualify for final tournament
2	B	Second place Group B	0	0	0	0	0	0	0	0	Qualify for final tournament
3	C	Second place Group C	0	0	0	0	0	0	0	0	Qualify for final tournament
4	D	Second place Group D	0	0	0	0	0	0	0	0	Qualify for final tournament
5	E	Second place Group E	0	0	0	0	0	0	0	0	Qualify for final tournament
6	F	Second place Group F	0	0	0	0	0	0	0	0	Qualify for final tournament
7	G	Second place Group G	0	0	0	0	0	0	0	0	Qualify for final tournament
8	H	Second place Group H	0	0	0	0	0	0	0	0	Qualify for final tournament
9	I	Second place Group I	0	0	0	0	0	0	0	0	Advance to play-offs
10	J	Second place Group J	0	0	0	0	0	0	0	0	Advance to play-offs
11	K	Second place Group K	0	0	0	0	0	0	0	0	Advance to play-offs
12	L	Second place Group L	0	0	0	0	0	0	0	0	Advance to play-offs

First match(es) will be played: March 2027. Source: UEFA
Rules for classification: Counting only matches against teams ranked first, third and fourth in the group, 1) Group position; 2) Points; 3) Goal difference; 4) Goals scored; 5) Away goals scored; 6) Wins; 7) Away wins; 8) Lower disciplinary points; 9) Higher position in the Nations League interim overall ranking.

== Play-offs ==
=== Slot allocation ===
Depending on the number of places available, places in the play-offs are allocated as follows:

- Between two and four play-off places are reserved for the lowest-ranked runners-up of the qualifying group stage.
- The four to nine remaining places are allocated to group winners from Leagues A, B and C of the 2026/27 UEFA Nations League that have not already qualified for the final tournament or the play-offs from the qualifying group stage, based on the interim overall 2026/27 UEFA Nations League rankings.
- If fewer than the required number of group winners of Leagues A, B and C are available to enter the play-offs, the next place is allocated to the League D group winner ranked 49th in the interim overall 2026/27 UEFA Nations League rankings, unless the team in question has already qualified for the final tournament or the play-offs.
- Any remaining play-off places are allocated to the highest-ranking teams in the interim overall 2026/27 UEFA Nations League rankings that have not already qualified for the final tournament or the play-offs.

=== Draw procedure for the play-offs ===
The UEFA administration conducts a draw to allocate the participating teams to the play-off paths or, if home and away ties are formed, the play-off ties.

If two or three play-off paths are formed, the eight or twelve teams entering the play-offs are ranked in the following order and then divided into four pots for the draw as follows:

- Runners-up of the qualifying group stage, according to their positions in the overall European Qualifiers rankings;
- Teams that qualified via the 2026/27 UEFA Nations League, according to their positions in the interim overall 2026/27 UEFA Nations League rankings.

The eight or twelve teams, ranked 1st to 8th or 1st to 12th respectively, are divided into four pots according to the ranking using the above procedure. Each play-off path is composed of two semi-final pairings of one seeded team and one unseeded team: Pot 1 vs Pot 4 and Pot 2 vs Pot 3. The winner of semi-final involving Pot 1 team will host the final.

If four play-off ties are formed, two pots are formed for the draw. Pot 1 contains the four runners-up of the qualifying group stage and Pot 2 the four teams that qualified via the 2026/27 UEFA Nations League, according to their positions in the interim overall 2026/27 UEFA Nations League rankings. The team from Pot 1 will play the second leg at home.

If two host association teams enter the play-offs, they are allocated to separate paths or ties. If qualified for the play-offs and if possible, Northern Ireland will be allocated to a path or tie that does not include a host association team.

Additional principles and conditions may apply, subject to approval by the UEFA Executive Committee.

=== Scenario 1: Two reserved host nation places used ===
Eight teams compete in two play-off paths for two final tournament places. The eight play-off places will be distributed as follows if this is the scenario triggered:

Number of worst runners-up (placed 9th-12th) who already qualified through a reserved host nation place	Worst runners-up tickets	UEFA Nations League tickets
0	4	4
1	3	5
2	2	6

==== Path A ====
Home team	Score	Away team
Semi-finals
Pot 1 team		Pot 4 team
Pot 2 team		Pot 3 team
Final
Winner of semi-final involving the Pot 1 team		Winner of semi-final involving the Pot 2 team

==== Path B ====
Home team	Score	Away team
Semi-finals
Pot 1 team		Pot 4 team
Pot 2 team		Pot 3 team
Final
Winner of semi-final involving the Pot 1 team		Winner of semi-final involving the Pot 2 team

=== Scenario 2: One reserved host nation place used ===
Twelve teams compete in three play-off paths for three final tournament places. The twelve play-off places will be distributed as follows if this is the scenario triggered:

Number of worst runners-up (placed 9th-12th) who already qualified through a reserved host nation place	Worst runner-up tickets	UEFA Nations League tickets
0	4	8
1	3	9

==== Path A ====
Home team	Score	Away team
Semi-finals
Pot 1 team		Pot 4 team
Pot 2 team		Pot 3 team
Final
Winner of semi-final involving the Pot 1 team		Winner of semi-final involving the Pot 2 team

==== Path B ====
Home team	Score	Away team
Semi-finals
Pot 1 team		Pot 4 team
Pot 2 team		Pot 3 team
Final
Winner of semi-final involving the Pot 1 team		Winner of semi-final involving the Pot 2 team

==== Path C ====
Home team	Score	Away team
Semi-finals
Pot 1 team		Pot 4 team
Pot 2 team		Pot 3 team
Final
Winner of semi-final involving the Pot 1 team		Winner of semi-final involving the Pot 2 team

=== Scenario 3: No reserved host nation places used ===
Eight teams compete in four home-and-away play-off ties for four final tournament places. The four worst runners-up from the group stage will be seeded (hosting the second leg at home) and the four teams from the 2026/27 UEFA Nations League will be unseeded.

==== Play-off ties ====
Team 1	Agg.	Team 2	1st leg	2nd leg
Seeded team	TBD	Unseeded team	TBD	TBD
Seeded team	TBD	Unseeded team	TBD	TBD
Seeded team	TBD	Unseeded team	TBD	TBD
Seeded team	TBD	Unseeded team	TBD	TBD
