= Waqa Nalaga =

Fijian rugby union player (born 2003)

- Full name: Epeli Waqaicece
- Born: 7 July 2003 (age 23) Fiji
- Height: 177 cm (5 ft 10 in)
- Weight: 91 kg (201 lb; 14 st 5 lb)
- Notable relative(s): Kavekini Nalaga (father); Napolioni Nalaga (brother)

Rugby union career
- Position: Centre
- Current team: Drua, Manawatu
Senior career
Years	Team	Apps	(Points)
2023–	Manawatu	3	(5)
2024–	Drua	5	(10)
- Correct as of 12 June 2024
International career
Years	Team	Apps	(Points)
2023	Fiji U20	3	(5)
- Correct as of 19 November 2023

Epeli Waqaicece (born 7 July 2003), commonly known as Waqa Nalaga, is a Fijian rugby union player, who plays for the Drua and Manawatu. His preferred position is centre.

== Early career ==
Nalaga studied at Cuvu College in Nadi before moving to New Zealand. He represented Fiji U20 in 2023.

== Professional career ==
Nalaga has represented Manawatu in the National Provincial Championship since 2023, being named in their full squad for the 2023 Bunnings NPC. He was named in the Drua squad for the 2024 Super Rugby Pacific season.
