= Viliami Napa'a =

Tongan rugby union player

- Born: 16 May 2002 (age 24) Tonga
- Height: 196 cm (6 ft 5 in)
- Weight: 100 kg (15 st 10 lb; 220 lb)
- School: Marlborough Boys' College

Rugby union career
- Position(s): Lock, Flanker
Senior career
| Years | Team | Apps | (Points) |
| 2021–2024 | Tasman | 7 | (5) |
| 2024 | Moana Pasifika | 0 | (0) |
- Correct as of 24 August 2024

Viliami Napa'a (born 16 May 2002) is a Tongan rugby union player. His position is Lock.

== Career ==
Born in Tonga, Napa'a moved to New Zealand where he was educated at Marlborough Boys' College. Napa'a made his debut for Tasman against Bay of Plenty at Trafalgar Park in a non competition match, coming off the bench in a 26–9 win for the Mako. The side went on to make the premiership final before losing 23–20 to Waikato. He was named in the squad for the 2022 Bunnings NPC as a development player.
