= Ofa Tauatevalu =

New Zealand rugby union player

- Born: 29 October 2000 (age 26) New Zealand
- Height: 201 cm (6 ft 7 in)
- Weight: 112 kg (247 lb; 17 st 9 lb)

Rugby union career
- Position: Lock
- Current team: Manawatu, Clean Fighters Yamanashi
Senior career
Years	Team	Apps	(Points)
2021–	Manawatu	28	(0)
2024–2026	Moana Pasifika	3	(5)
2026–	Clean Fighters Yamanashi	1	(0)
- Correct as of 19 November 2023

Ofa Tauatevalu (born 29 October 2000) is a New Zealand rugby union player of Tongan descent, who plays for Manawatu. His preferred position is lock.

== Early career ==
Tauatevalu plays his club rugby for Kia Toa rugby club where his performances had attracted the attention of the Hurricanes.

== Professional career ==
Tauatevalu has represented Manawatu in the National Provincial Championship since 2021, being named in their full squad for the 2023 Bunnings NPC. He was named in the Moana Pasifika squad for the 2024 Super Rugby Pacific season.
