= National Provincial Championship =

The National Provincial Championship may refer to:

- National Provincial Championship (1976–2005), original competition before reform into 14 sides
- National Provincial Championship (2006–present) (currently known as the Bunnings NPC), new 14 team competition previously known as the Air New Zealand Cup, ITM Cup and Mitre 10 Cup that replaced the old National Provincial Championship.
