= Tevita Langi =

New Zealand rugby union player

- Born: 6 June 2000 (age 26) Auckland, New Zealand
- Height: 187 cm (6 ft 2 in)
- Weight: 126 kg (278 lb; 19 st 12 lb)
- School: Massey High School

Rugby union career
- Position: Prop
- Current team: North Harbour
Senior career
Years	Team	Apps	(Points)
2022–	North Harbour	22	(5)
2023	Rugby New York	11	(5)
2024	Moana Pasifika	2	(0)
- Correct as of 11 December 2024

Tevita Langi (born 6 June 2000) is a New Zealand rugby union player, who played for Moana Pasifika in Super Rugby and plays for North Harbour in the National Provincial Championship. His preferred position is prop.

== Early career ==
Langi attended Massey High School where his performances earned him selection for the North Harbour academy, who he represented at U18 level. He plays his club rugby for Massey in the North Harbour region.

== Professional career ==
Langi has represented North Harbour in the National Provincial Championship since 2022, being named in their full squad for the 2024 Bunnings NPC. In 2023 he signed for Rugby United New York for the 2023 Major League Rugby season, making 11 appearances for the side. He was called into the Moana Pasifika squad as an injury replacement during the 2024 Super Rugby Pacific season, making his debut for the side in Round 13 of the season against the Hurricanes.
