= Viliami Fine =

NZ rugby union player (born 1997)

- Born: 1 December 1997 (age 28) New Zealand
- Height: 192 cm (6 ft 4 in)
- Weight: 103 kg (227 lb; 16 st 3 lb)
- School: St Bernard's College, Lower Hutt

Rugby union career
- Position: Wing/Centre
Senior career
Years	Team	Apps	(Points)
2021	Otago	6	(0)
2022 - 2024	Southland	27	(45)
2024 -	Moana Pasifika	7	(0)
- Correct as of 25 August 2021
International career
Years	Team	Apps	(Points)
2021–	Tonga	2	(0)
- Correct as of 25 August 2021
National sevens team
Years	Team		Comps
2020	Tonga Sevens		2

Viliami Fine (born 1 December 1997) is a Tongan rugby union player who played for Otago and Southland in the National Provincial Championship. His playing position is wing/centre. He has also played for Moana Pasifika and represented the Tonga national rugby team.
