= Donald Brighouse =

- Born: 29 March 1993 (age 33) Wellington, New Zealand
- Height: 181 cm (5 ft 11 in)
- Weight: 118 kg (260 lb; 18 st 8 lb)
- School: St. Patrick's College

Rugby union career
- Position: Prop
- Current team: Taranaki
Senior career
Years	Team	Apps	(Points)
2014–2018	Otago	49	(10)
2018	Crusaders	6	(0)
2019	Coventry	9	(0)
2019–	Taranaki	20	(5)
2020	New England Free Jacks	4	(5)
- Correct as of 16 July 2021
International career
Years	Team	Apps	(Points)
2013	New Zealand U20	5	(0)
2017–2018	Samoa	4	(0)
2018	Samoa A	3	(0)
- Correct as of 16 July 2021

Donald I.M. Brighouse (born 29 March 1993) is a Samoan rugby union player who plays for the New England Free Jacks in Major League Rugby (MLR). His position of choice is prop.

He previously played for the Crusaders in the Super Rugby competition.
