= Jacob Norris (rugby union) =

New Zealand rugby union player

- Full name: Jacob Norris
- Born: 27 November 1998 (age 27) New Zealand
- Height: 189 cm (6 ft 2 in)
- Weight: 104 kg (16 st 5 lb; 229 lb)
- School: St. Peter's College
- Notable relative: Ollie Norris (brother)

Rugby union career
- Position: Flanker
- Current team: Bay of Plenty
Senior career
Years	Team	Apps	(Points)
2018–2021	Tasman	23	(25)
2022–	Bay of Plenty	39	(15)
2023	Force	1	(0)
2024	Moana Pasifika	12	(5)
- Correct as of 18 October 2025
International career
Years	Team	Apps	(Points)
2021	Māori All Blacks	1	(0)
- Correct as of 18 October 2025

Jacob K. Norris (born 27 November 1998) is a New Zealand rugby union player. His position is flanker. He has played for the Māori All Blacks.

== Early life ==
Jacob played junior rugby for the Tauranga Sports rugby club before heading to St Peters Cambridge on a sports scholarship.

== National Provincial Championship ==
Norris made his debut for Tasman in Round 7 of the 2018 Mitre 10 Cup against Wellington at Sky Stadium in Wellington. He was part of the Mako side that won the 2019 Mitre 10 Cup. He captained the Mako squad that toured the United States of America in January 2020. In September 2020 he was named in the Tasman Mako squad for the first time. Norris played the first 6 games for the Mako in the 2020 season but then suffered a season ending injury as the Mako went on to win their second premiership title in a row. Norris had a big season as Tasman made the 2021 Bunnings NPC final before losing to Waikato 23–20.

He returned home to Bay of Plenty for the 2022 Bunnings NPC.

== Super Rugby ==
Norris was in the Crusaders Development side and in July 2020 Norris was called into the Crusaders squad during Super Rugby Aotearoa as an injury replacement for Ethan Blackadder.

In April 2023 Norris was named in the Western Force team as injury cover for their match against the NSW Waratahs. In 2024 Norris played for Moana Pasifika. In December 2024 Norris was named in the Chiefs wider training and replacement players group for the 2025 season.

== Māori All Blacks ==
In June 2021 Norris was called into the Māori All Blacks squad as injury cover. He made his debut against Samoa at Sky Stadium in Wellington, coming off the bench in a 35-10 win for the side.
