= Siaosi Nginingini =

Tongan rugby union player

- Born: 17 October 1998 (age 28) New Zealand
- Height: 183 cm (6 ft 0 in)
- Weight: 91 kg (201 lb; 14 st 5 lb)

Rugby union career
- Position: Halfback
- Current team: North Harbour
Senior career
Years	Team	Apps	(Points)
2019	Counties Manukau	1	(0)
2021–	North Harbour	28	(20)
2024–2026	Moana Pasifika	2	(0)
- Correct as of 11 December 2024
International career
Years	Team	Apps	(Points)
2024–	Tonga	3	(5)
- Correct as of 11 December 2024

Siaosi Nginingini (born 17 October 1998) is a Tongan rugby union player, who played for Moana Pasifika in Super Rugby and plays for North Harbour in the National Provincial Championship. His preferred position is halfback.

== Early career ==
Nginingini plays his club rugby for Massey RFC. He had previously played for Tongan side Falaleu RFC and came through the academy system at Counties Manukau having been named in their U19 side.

== Professional career ==
Nginingini has represented North Harbour in the National Provincial Championship since 2021, being named in their full squad for the 2024 Bunnings NPC. He had previously played for Counties Manukau in the 2019 Mitre 10 Cup.

After missing the 2020 Mitre 10 Cup, Nginingini signed with North Harbour in 2021.

He was called into the Moana Pasifika squad as an injury replacement during the 2024 Super Rugby Pacific season, making his debut for the side in Round 1w of the season against the Chiefs. In 2024 he also made his debut for the Tongan national side making his debut against Romania in November, before scoring his first try against the United States.
