= Ivan Fepuleai =

Samoan rugby union player

- Born: 19 March 1997 (age 29) Samoa
- Height: 184 cm (6 ft 0 in)
- Weight: 108 kg (238 lb; 17 st 0 lb)
- School: St Patrick's College, Silverstream

Rugby union career
- Position: Prop
Senior career
Years	Team	Apps	(Points)
2024	Moana Pasifika	1	(0)
- Correct as of 11 December 2024
International career
Years	Team	Apps	(Points)
2017	Samoa U20	3	(0)
- Correct as of 11 December 2024

Ivan Fepuleai (born 19 March 1997) is a Samoan rugby union player, who played for Moana Pasifika in Super Rugby. His preferred position is prop.

== Early career ==
Fepuleai was born in Samoa, originally going to school in Apia, however moved to New Zealand to attend St Patrick's College, Silverstream where his appearances for the school earned him selection for the Wellington academy, representing their U19 side. In 2017 he earned selection for the Samoa U20 side where he captained the team. He played club rugby in Wellington for Marist before moving to Australia in 2018 where between then and 2023 he represented both Gordon and Manly.

== Professional career ==
Following returning to New Zealand, Fepuleai joined up with Moana Pasifika as a training player, before being called into their side as an injury replacement ahead of Round 15 of the 2024 Super Rugby Pacific season, making his debut against the Crusaders. Fepuleai also captained Manuma Samoa in the 2024 World Rugby Pacific Challenge.
