= Waisake Naholo =

NZ international rugby union player

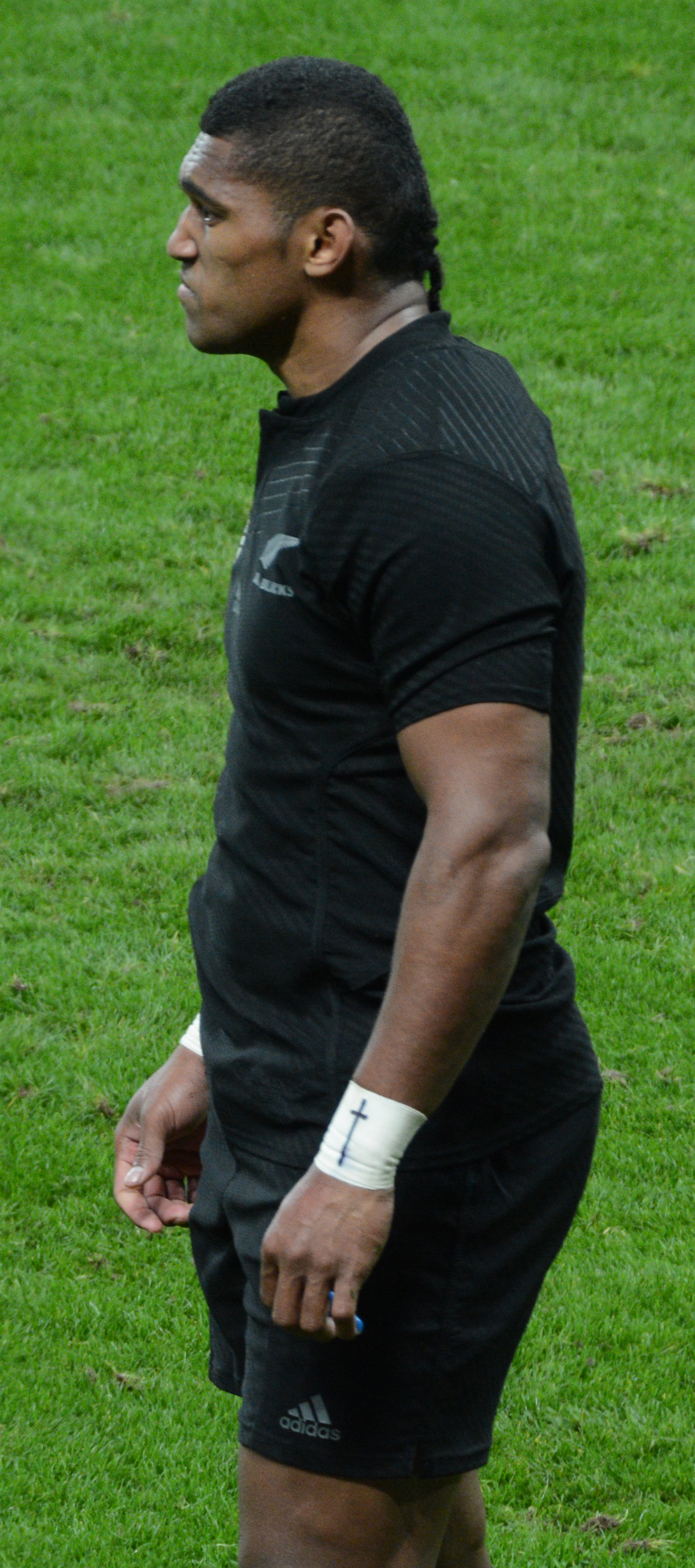
- Naholo representing New Zealand during the 2015 Rugby World Cup
- Full name: Waisake Ratunideuba Naholo
- Born: 8 May 1991 (age 35) Sigatoka, Fiji
- Height: 186 cm (6 ft 1 in)
- Weight: 105 kg (231 lb; 16 st 7 lb)
- School: Wanganui City College

Rugby union career
- Position: Wing
Senior career
Years	Team	Apps	(Points)
2009	Wanganui	11	(30)
2011–2019	Taranaki	44	(110)
2013	Blues	2	(5)
2015–2019	Highlanders	62	(225)
2020	London Irish	4	(10)
2021	Canterbury	8	(15)
2022	New York	6	(10)
2023-2024	Otago		
- Correct as of 30 December 2022
International career
Years	Team	Apps	(Points)
2011	New Zealand U20	4	(0)
2015–2018	New Zealand	27	(80)
2015	Barbarian F.C.	2	(10)
- Correct as of 30 December 2022
National sevens team
Years	Team		Comps
2012–2014	New Zealand		9
- Correct as of 30 December 2022

Waisake Ratunideuba Naholo (born 8 May 1991 Sigatoka, Fiji) is a former New Zealand rugby union player. He previously played for the All Blacks Sevens and on the wing (and occasionally centre) position for London Irish.

Naholo made his test debut for the All Blacks in 2015 and was a member of the 2015 Rugby World Cup-winning team.

A former New Zealand under-20 rep, Naholo has played in five Sevens World Series tournaments, and featured in Gordon Tietjens' squad which won the 2013 Rugby World Cup Sevens. Naholo earned himself a Blues contract after a superb ITM Cup season in 2012. Starting on the wing, he became a regular try-scoring threat. At provincial level, he began his career with Wanganui before making the switch to Taranaki in 2011. He was also part of the Highlanders team that won the 2015 Super Rugby title.

== Playing career ==
=== Early career ===
At just 18, Naholo was playing provincial rugby, playing the 2009 Heartland Championship with Wanganui, he was contracted and appeared in eleven matches and recorded six tries while still at school. In 2011, Naholo moved north to Taranaki. He made his debut for the side, when he started on the wing against Wellington in week one of the competition. He played mainly on the left wing throughout the season, featuring in five matches with the only one game coming off the bench. He also became a member of the Hurricanes wider training group for 2012.

Naholo was selected in the New Zealand Sevens team to prepare for the 2012 IRB World Series in Wellington, making his international rugby debut at Westpac Stadium. Naholo also played for the New Zealand U20 side that defended its World U20 championship crown in Italy in 2011.

In 2012, Naholo continued to be a key contributor for Taranaki, playing the season's first two Ranfurly Shield matches against King Country and Wanganui. He played his second consecutive ITM Cup season for Taranaki. Naholo started the season scoring a solo try taking the ball from a line-out on half way and easily beating Bay of Plenty defenders to score untouched. He ended the season with a total of eight matches and five tries, enough to earn him a Super Rugby contract with the Blues.

After an impressive showing in the ITM Cup, Naholo earned his first Super Rugby start in the Blues 21–28 loss to the Bulls in Round 4 of the 2013 Super Rugby season. He had the only one appearance after against the Highlanders finishing with a try.

=== 2015–2016 ===
In February 2015, he signed a 2-year contract with French Top 14 club, ASM Clermont Auvergne. He was to join the club at the end of the 2015 ITM Cup but decided to pull out of the contract after a good super rugby season as he was now in contention for an All Black spot and he was subsequently released by Clermont. Naholo was the top try-scorer of the 2015 Super Rugby season, scoring 13 tries for the Highlanders that year.

Naholo has since been selected in a squad of 41 for the New Zealand All Blacks. He was eligible to be selected for the historic test against Manu Samoa in Apia on 8 July, The Rugby Championship and the return Bledisloe Cup match at Eden Park on 15 August.

He made his debut on the right wing in the 2015 Rugby Championship against Argentina but was subbed off in the 51st minute with a cracked bone which would rule him out for 3 months thus ruling him out of the 2015 Rugby World Cup.

However, in a shock move which defied the odds, Naholo was named in the 31-man squad for the Rugby World Cup 2015, being chosen over 53-test veteran Cory Jane and 49-test veteran Israel Dagg, the latter of whom had also been struggling with injury. He was expected to be match-fit for the All Blacks third pool game against Georgia. Naholo played in matches against Georgia and Tonga, scoring the opening try for the former, making it his first international score.

In June 2016, he made a return to the All Blacks after coach Steve Hansen included him in his 32-man squad for the 2016 June international test series against Wales. He was named on the right wing for their first test against Wales. Naholo scored a double in the first test and lasted the full 80 minutes, with the All Blacks winning 39-21. Due to the return of Israel Dagg who celebrated his 50th test in the second game of the Welsh series, Naholo started the test on the left wing rather than the right, with Julian Savea missing the second test. Naholo scored a try in the 60th minute of the second test and set up rookie loose forward Ardie Savea for his first international try only five minutes later, making the final score 36-22 after a comeback from Welsh backs Liam Williams and Jonathan Davies. Naholo was used as a replacement off the bench for re-called midfielder George Moala who was injured in the 48th minute of the third test. Naholo settled well into the centres despite mid-air collisions with Welsh backs and played his part in the 46-6 demolishing of Wales in the third test. Naholo finished the three-test series as the equal top try-scorer of the series alongside new starting first-five Beauden Barrett.

Naholo was named to start on the left-wing in round one of the 2016 Rugby Championship with Savea benched against the Wallabies. Barrett set Naholo up for a try in the 39th minute but Naholo tore his hamstring upon scoring, leaving him to be replaced by Savea who scored his 40th All Blacks try that match. The All Blacks went on to beat Australia 42-8 without Naholo taking any further part. Naholo made his return to the All Blacks from injury on 8 October 2017 where they beat South Africa 57-15, Naholo playing on the left wing and being replaced by Lima Sopoaga in the 62nd minute. Naholo made appearances in all four tests on the 2016 end-of-year tour, starting in three but was very out-of-form following his return from injury. Naholo scored his 5th try of the 2016 season on 12 November where the All Blacks thrashed Italy 68-10 in Rome.

=== 2017–2019 ===
Naholo was named to start on the right wing for the Highlanders against the touring British & Irish Lions on 13 June 2017. Naholo scored a try off a 10-meter run in the 25th minute, with Irish fullback Jared Payne and forwards CJ Stander and Courtney Lawes all failing to stop Naholo from scoring five points. After a dominant 80-minute game including his try and a huge defensive performance, Naholo was a clear standout in the game, winning the award for Man of the Match against the Lions.

Naholo was retained by the All Blacks in New Zealand's 33-man squad for the 2017 Pasifika Challenge against Samoa and three-test British & Irish Lions series. Naholo only played once in those mid-year tests, being chosen to start on the right wing in the second test against the Lions after All Blacks vice-captain Ben Smith was concussed in the first test. Naholo was replaced in the 59th minute of the second test by Aaron Cruden after being knocked out by Lions loose forward Seán O'Brien, who went on to win Man of the Match. Naholo's absence allowed Taulupe Faletau to score for the Lions only seconds later, with Israel Dagg incapable of replicating Naholo's defensive ability due to the size difference between Dagg and Faletau. The All Blacks missed Naholo a lot after he was replaced, losing to the Lions 21-24. Naholo was ruled out of the third test due to concussion, allowing Hurricanes back Jordie Barrett to start for the All Blacks the first time in his career. The All Blacks went on to draw the series.

Naholo went missing in the 2017 Rugby Championship and was released to play for Taranaki, as Ben Smith wanted to make the most of the 2017 before his sabbatical, as well as the fact that Nehe Milner-Skudder had returned from a foot injury. Naholo played his lone Rugby Championship match of 2017 against Argentina on 30 September in Buenos Aires, scoring a try off an offload from Beauden Barrett and setting up All Blacks captain Kieran Read for the opening try- the first of Read's two tries that day.

Following Milner-Skudder being ruled out for rugby for 6 months due to needing shoulder surgery, Naholo started against the Wallabies for the third Bledisloe Cup test of 2017. Naholo scored a try against the Australians and made a tackle on Wallaby scrum-half Will Genia which was one of many tackles in the All Blacks' 18-23 loss to Australia to make headlines. Naholo's performance against Australia allowed him to make starts in all four of his appearances on the 2017 end-of-year tour. Naholo won Man of the Match against France on 11 November 2017 after finishing the game with his second try for the day, allowing the final score to be 38-18, another All Blacks win. After avoiding a yellow card for mid-air contact with Scottish fullback Stuart Hogg in the narrow 22-17 victory over Scotland, Naholo started against Wales on the right wing and finished his 2017 season with one of the best performances of his entire career, scoring the first two tries of the test before being replaced by the departing Lima Sopoaga with 10 minutes left of the All Blacks' 33-18 victory. Naholo missed out on winning another Man of the Match award due to the outstanding performance of fellow winger and World Rugby Breakthrough Player of the Year Rieko Ioane against the Welsh. Naholo finished behind Ioane as the (equal with Beauden Barrett) second-to-highest try scorer of any All Black in 2017, scoring six tries from only seven All Blacks appearances in 2017.

Naholo played in eight tests throughout the 2018 season, scoring four tries for New Zealand that year, including a double against Australia on 18 August, scoring both tries in the space of two minutes, towards the end of the 38-13 win.

Naholo played his last test for New Zealand on 24 November 2018, which was a 66-3 win over Italy.

It was confirmed in February 2019 that Naholo would be joining London Irish and scored a try in his first league start vs Leicester Tigers. This was on the back of Irish signing flanker Seán O'Brien from Leinster, who Naholo had previously played against.

After an injury-ravaged 2019 Super Rugby season, rookie wingers George Bridge and Sevu Reece overtook Naholo in the national pecking order. This meant that Naholo was not selected for the 2019 Rugby World Cup.
