= Jack McGrath (rugby union) =

Irish rugby union player (born 1989)

- Born: Jack McGrath; 11 October 1989 (age 37) Dublin, Ireland
- Height: 1.85 m (6 ft 1 in)
- Weight: 118 kg (18 st 8 lb)
- School: St Mary's College

Rugby union career
- Position: Loosehead Prop
Amateur team(s)
Years	Team	Apps	(Points)
–	St Mary's College		
Senior career
Years	Team	Apps	(Points)
2010–2019	Leinster	145	(60)
2019–2022	Ulster	25	(0)
- Correct as of 20 April 2022
International career
Years	Team	Apps	(Points)
2009	Ireland U20	13	(0)
2013	Emerging Ireland	3	(0)
2014–2015	Ireland Wolfhounds	2	(0)
2013–2019	Ireland	56	(10)
2017	British & Irish Lions	3	(0)
- Correct as of 25 April 2020

Jack McGrath (born 11 October 1989) is a former Irish rugby union player who played loosehead prop. He played professionally for Leinster and Ulster and has also played international rugby for Ireland and the British and Irish Lions.

McGrath made his senior debut for Leinster in April 2010 against Glasgow Warriors, and became a regular member of the team in the 2011-12 season. He went on to make 142 appearances for the province, scoring 12 tries. During his time there, Leinster won the European Rugby Champions Cup twice, the European Rugby Challenge Cup once, the Pro12 twice, and the Pro14 once. He trained with the Ireland team ahead of the 2012 Six Nations Championship. He was named in the 34-man Ireland squad for the 2013 end-of-year rugby union tests, and was praised by Ireland captain Rory Best for his hard work in the scrum. He started in the first of the tests against Samoa on 9 November 2013, and was named "Man of the match" for his performance. He went on to earn 56 caps for his country.

In 2016 he helped launch the Irish Rugby Union Players Association's "Tackle Your Feelings" mental health campaign.

He was selected for the 2017 British & Irish Lions tour to New Zealand, played 186 minutes on the tour, and appeared off the bench in all three tests, impressing with his tackling and scrummaging. He sustained a hip injury during the tour, and underwent minor surgery on his return.

Once seen as the natural successor to Cian Healy, he lost his place in the Leinster and Ireland teams after Healy recovered from a hand injury. He moved to Ulster ahead of the 2019–20 season. He was named in the Ireland squad for the 2020 Six Nations Championship. By November 2020, after 20 appearances for Ulster, he suffered a recurrence of his hip injury which left him unable to carry out daily activities. He became only the third sportsman, after Seán O'Brien and Andy Murray, to undergo hip resurfacing surgery, and did not return to the Ulster team until December 2021. He signed a contract extension with Ulster in January 2022, but was released at the end of the 2021–22 season.

On the 16 February 2023, he announced his retirement from professional rugby.
