= Rhys Webb =

British Lions & Wales international rugby union footballer (born 1988)

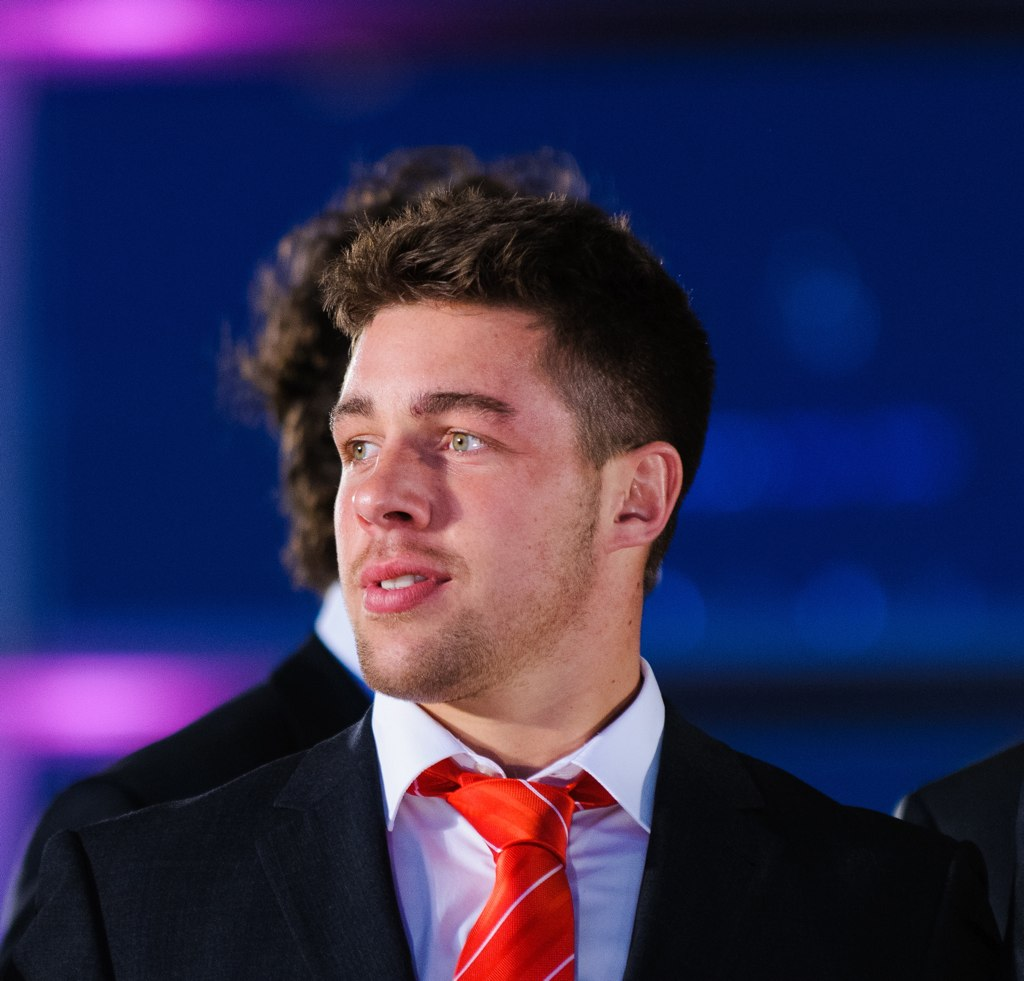
- Webb at the Wales Grand Slam celebration at the Senedd building, Cardiff, in March 2012
- Born: 9 December 1988 (age 37) Bridgend, Wales
- Height: 183 cm (6 ft 0 in)
- Weight: 93 kg (14 st 9 lb)
- School: Brynteg Comprehensive School

Rugby union career
- Position: Scrum-half
- Current team: None
Youth career
- Bridgend Athletic
Senior career
Years	Team	Apps	(Points)
2006–2009	Bridgend	13	(20)
2009–2011	Aberavon	12	(15)
2007–2018	Ospreys	154	(195)
2018–2020	Toulon	29	(20)
2020	Bath	1	(0)
2020–2023	Ospreys	44	(64)
2023–2024	Biarritz	1	(5)
International career
Years	Team	Apps	(Points)
2004	Wales U16		
2006	Wales U18		
2007	Wales U19	7	(0)
2008	Wales U20	7	(5)
2012–2023	Wales	40	(40)
2017	British & Irish Lions	2	(5)
- Correct as of 18 March 2023
National sevens team
Years	Team		Comps
2009	Wales		

Rhys Webb (born 9 December 1988) is a Welsh rugby union player who plays as a scrum-half. Born in Bridgend, he is a product of the Ospreys academy and played club rugby for Bridgend and Aberavon before breaking into the regional side in 2008. He played for the Ospreys for 10 years before moving to French club Toulon in 2018, but terminated his contract with them in 2020 and agreed a return to the Ospreys; however, he was unable to join the Ospreys immediately and signed for Bath for the remainder of the 2019–20 season before returning to the Ospreys.

Webb represented Wales at under-16, under-18, under-19 and under-20 levels, as well as in international rugby sevens, before making his debut for the senior national team in 2012. He played 31 times before the Welsh Rugby Union's selection criteria meant his move to Toulon made him ineligible for further selection; however, his decision to return to the Ospreys in 2020 meant he could again be included in the selection pool. Webb was also selected in the British & Irish Lions' squad for their 2017 tour to New Zealand.

Webb is currently serving a four year ban due to end in June 2027 in relation to an anti-doping rule violation after testing positive for human growth hormone (HGH) in July 2023.

== Career ==
=== Club career ===
Born in Bridgend and educated at Brynteg Comprehensive School, Webb began his rugby career with Bridgend Athletic RFC, and also played for Bridgend and Aberavon in the Welsh Premiership while coming through the Ospreys age grade system; he won the Reebok Regional Championship trophy with the under-18s side during the 2005–06 season and was a losing finalist with the under-20s during the 2006–07 season. He was also a Rugby league junior with Bridgend Blue Bulls and East Wales in 2004.

He made his debut for the senior regional side in March 2008, coming on as a substitute for Shane Williams in a 32–7 win over Ulster. He made another substitute appearance in a 19–18 loss to Edinburgh a month later, replacing Justin Marshall, before starting the final two games of the season against the Newport Gwent Dragons and Connacht. At the end of the season, he signed a new four-year contract with the region.

Injuries to fellow scrum-halves Mike Phillips and Jamie Nutbrown during the 2008–09 season meant more opportunities for Webb to make an impression in the Ospreys first team, making 11 appearances during the season. He played just twice in the team's title-winning 2009–10 campaign, but eventually supplanted Phillips as the Ospreys' starting scrum-half during the 2010–11 season, after impressing while Phillips was on Wales duty. He suffered a shoulder injury at the end of the season, but underwent surgery and was fit enough to begin the 2011–12 season as the team's starting scrum-half, replacing Phillips, who had moved to Bayonne. Webb scored his first senior try in the opening game of the season, a 27–3 win at home to Leinster. He scored again the following week against Edinburgh, and added two more before the end of the season.

In March 2015, Webb became the eighth player to sign a dual-contract between club and the WRU.

An ankle injury suffered in Wales' opening Autumn international against Australia on 5 November ruled him out for up to 12 weeks, but recovered slightly ahead of schedule, and scored within four minutes of his return to club rugby as he captained the Ospreys to a 26–21 win over Newcastle Falcons in the Challenge Cup on 21 January. He also played the first half of the Ospreys' 20–14 Anglo-Welsh Cup win over Bristol, before returning to Wales duty for the 2017 Six Nations.

On 10 October 2017, it was announced that Webb would leave Ospreys after 10 years with the region to join French club Toulon in the Top 14 on a three-year contract. In March 2018, Webb suffered a knee injury and missed the remainder of the season, bringing his time with the Ospreys to a premature end.

In December 2019, Webb cut short his contract with Toulon to return to the Ospreys in the summer of 2020. Webb had been due to see out the remainder of the season with Toulon, but the club's owner accused Webb of having shown a "dishonest attitude" to get himself released from his contract, and stated that Webb would not play for Toulon again. Now without a club, he signed a short-term deal with Bath in February 2020 for the remainder of the 2019–20 Premiership Rugby season. He made his debut on 1 March 2020, in a 19–13 home defeat to Bristol Bears, the first time Bath had lost at home to Bristol in 14 years.

In July 2023, Webb returned for a second spell in France, signing for second-tier side Biarritz. A week after joining and after playing one game in which he scored a try, Webb was tested by the French Anti-Doping Agency (AFLD) during a training session; the sample returned a positive result for growth hormone, and Webb was issued with a provisional suspension. In July 2024, the AFLD issued Webb with a four-year global ban from rugby union. Webb stated that he would appeal the sanction.

=== International career ===
Webb played for Wales U18 in the 2005–06 U18 Home Four Nations Championship and was called up as a member of the 2006–07 Wales U19 set-up for the IRB U19 World Championships. He was called up to the Wales U20 squad for the 2007–2008 RBS U20 Six Nations Championships where he played three times and scored a try, and was also in the squad for the 2008 IRB Junior World Championships.

Webb was a member of the Wales squad that won the 2009 Rugby World Cup Sevens in Dubai and remained part of the national rugby sevens set-up in 2010.

In January 2012, he was called into Wales' 35-man senior squad for the training camp in Poland prior to the 2012 Six Nations Championship. He made his full international debut for Wales against Italy on 10 March 2012 as a second-half replacement.

On 6 September 2015, Webb was injured during a warm up match against Italy and was ruled out of the 2015 Rugby World Cup. He was replaced by Gareth Davies.

Recalled during the 2016 Six Nations Championship after a remarkable recovery, producing man-of-the-match performances for the Ospreys, Webb replaced Davies at scrum-half during the match against England. He was then back at first-choice for his position, starting for Wales' last match of the tournament against Italy.

Webb began the 2016 Autumn internationals as Wales' first-choice scrum-half, but suffered a serious ankle injury during the second half of their opening match against Australia, and following surgery was ruled out for 12 weeks, with his return predicted for just prior to the 2017 Six Nations Championship.

Webb was selected by the British & Irish Lions for their 2017 tour to New Zealand. He appeared as a replacement in two of the test matches on the tour, and scored one try.

Following Webb's decision to leave the Ospreys for Toulon in 2017, the Welsh Rugby Union (WRU) introduced new regulations governing the selection of players for the national team, whereby players based outside Wales with fewer than 60 caps would no longer be considered for selection, including Webb, who had only 28 caps at the time; however, this met with controversy as Webb agreed to move to Toulon before the rule changes were announced, leading to arguments that they should not apply to him, especially as Toulon claimed the WRU had already agreed terms for Webb's release for international matches during his time there. Webb described the WRU's decision as a "blow", but said he would not reverse his decision despite the change to his selection status. He played in three of Wales' 2017 Autumn internationals, but a knee injury in early 2018 meant he missed the 2018 Six Nations Championship, leaving him unable to add to his 31 caps before leaving for France.

In the lead-up to the 2019 Rugby World Cup, Wales coach Warren Gatland expressed his regret at not being able to select Webb for the tournament, and later said he thought the 60-cap selection threshold was too high. Webb did, however, play a part in the World Cup warm-up matches, appearing for the Barbarians in their 51–43 loss to England.

With Webb's return to the Ospreys agreed in December 2019, he was again made available for selection for Wales duty. He was named in the squad for the 2020 Six Nations Championship on 15 January 2020, and made appearances off the bench in the opening match against Italy and the penultimate match against England, before starting against Scotland on the final weekend, his first start since November 2017.

Webb found himself out of Wales reckoning under Wayne Pivac, but was recalled by returning head coach Warren Gatland for the 2023 Six Nations squad.

Webb announced his retirement from international rugby on 31 May 2023.

=== International tries ===
==== Wales ====
Try	Opponent	Location	Venue	Competition	Date	Result
1	Australia	Cardiff, Wales	Millennium Stadium	2014 Autumn Internationals	8 November 2014	Loss
2	New Zealand	Cardiff, Wales	Millennium Stadium	2014 Autumn Internationals	22 November 2014	Loss
3	England	Cardiff, Wales	Millennium Stadium	2015 Six Nations	6 February 2015	Loss
4	Scotland	Edinburgh, Scotland	Murrayfield	2015 Six Nations	6 February 2015	Win
5	Italy	Rome, Italy	Stadio Olimpico	2015 Six Nations	21 March 2015	Win
6	Italy	Cardiff, Wales	Millennium Stadium	2016 Six Nations	16 March 2016	Win
7	New Zealand	Auckland, New Zealand	Eden Park	2016 Tour of New Zealand	11 June 2016	Loss
8	Georgia	Llanelli, Wales	Parc y Scarlets	Autumn Nations Cup	21 November 2020	Win

==== British & Irish Lions ====
Try	Opponent	Location	Venue	Competition	Date	Result
1	New Zealand	Auckland, New Zealand	Eden Park	2017 British & Irish Lions tour to New Zealand	24 June 2017	Loss

== Personal life ==
Webb and his family live in Dubai.
