= 2017 British & Irish Lions tour to New Zealand =

Rugby union tour

- Date: 3 June – 8 July
- Coach: (New Zealand) Warren Gatland
- Tour captain: (Wales) Sam Warburton
- Test series winners: Series drawn (1–1)
- Top point scorer: (England) Owen Farrell (45)
- Top try scorer: (Scotland) Tommy Seymour (3)
- Top test point scorer: (England) Owen Farrell (31)
- Top test try scorers: Four players: (Wales) Taulupe Faletau (1); (Ireland) Conor Murray (1); (Ireland) Seán O'Brien (1); (Wales) Rhys Webb (1)
Summary
| P | W | D | L |
Total
| 10 | 5 | 2 | 3 |
Test match
| 3 | 1 | 1 | 1 |
Opponent
| P | W | D | L |
New Zealand
| 3 | 1 | 1 | 1 |

Tour chronology
- ← Australia 2013 South Africa 2021 →

The British & Irish Lions toured New Zealand during June and July 2017. The Lions, a rugby union team selected from players eligible to represent England, Ireland, Scotland or Wales, played ten matches: against all five New Zealand Super Rugby franchises, the New Zealand Provincial Barbarians, the Māori All Blacks and three test matches against New Zealand.

The test series was drawn 1–1 – one victory each and a draw in the third match. Of the other tour matches, the Lions won four, lost two and drew one.

Wales coach Warren Gatland was head coach of the Lions, having also led the Lions to victory in the 2013 series against Australia. Former Wales captain Sam Warburton was appointed as tour captain, a role he also held on the 2013 tour. The Lions squad voted Jonathan Davies their player of the series.

== Schedule ==
The ten-match schedule was announced on 9 July 2015, and included matches against New Zealand Super Rugby teams for the first time. Previously in New Zealand, the Lions had played provincial sides or combined provincial selections. However, this was the first tour to New Zealand where the visit fell in the middle of the Super Rugby season.

Initially, the Lions proposed a match in the United States against the U.S. national team to open the tour, much like the Barbarians match in Hong Kong in 2013. However, on 6 July 2015, the idea was dropped because of the unavailability of key American players due to club commitments. The opening match of the tour was originally planned to be against a Provincial Union XV, but this was changed to the New Zealand Barbarians in March 2016, following their win over the Māori All Blacks.

Christchurch was initially planned to host a test match but, due to the 2011 Christchurch earthquake which damaged Lancaster Park beyond repair, it was deemed that the remaining stadiums in the South Island were too small to host a test match.

| Date | Home team | Score | Away team | Venue | Details | Result |
|---|---|---|---|---|---|---|
| 3 June | New Zealand Provincial Barbarians | 7–13 | British & Irish Lions | Okara Park, Whangārei | Match details | Win |
| 7 June | Blues | 22–16 | British & Irish Lions | Eden Park, Auckland | Match details | Loss |
| 10 June | Crusaders | 3–12 | British & Irish Lions | Rugby League Park, Christchurch | Match details | Win |
| 13 June | Highlanders | 23–22 | British & Irish Lions | Forsyth Barr Stadium, Dunedin | Match details | Loss |
| 17 June | Māori All Blacks | 10–32 | British & Irish Lions | Rotorua International Stadium, Rotorua | Match details | Win |
| 20 June | Chiefs | 6–34 | British & Irish Lions | Waikato Stadium, Hamilton | Match details | Win |
| 24 June | New Zealand | 30–15 | British & Irish Lions | Eden Park, Auckland | Match details | Loss |
| 27 June | Hurricanes | 31–31 | British & Irish Lions | Wellington Regional Stadium, Wellington | Match details | Draw |
| 1 July | New Zealand | 21–24 | British & Irish Lions | Wellington Regional Stadium, Wellington | Match details | Win |
| 8 July | New Zealand | 15–15 | British & Irish Lions | Eden Park, Auckland | Match details | Draw |

== Squads ==
=== Lions ===
Tour manager John Spencer announced an initial squad of 41 on 19 April 2017, made up of 16 players from England, 12 from Wales, 11 from Ireland and 2 from Scotland.

Ben Youngs was initially selected in the squad but withdrew on 6 May for personal reasons. Billy Vunipola withdrew from the squad on 21 May after suffering a shoulder injury while playing for his club Saracens.

On 17 June, six players – Kristian Dacey, Gareth Davies, Allan Dell, Tomas Francis, Cory Hill and Finn Russell – were added to the squad to provide cover during mid-week games ahead of the test series. These players were nicknamed the "Geography Six" as they were on tour with their national teams in Australia and New Zealand at the time.

Ross Moriarty was ruled out of the tour after an injury sustained against the New Zealand Provincial Barbarians. On 29 June, Robbie Henshaw and George North were ruled out of the remaining games after sustaining injuries against the Hurricanes. Jared Payne was ruled out of the final game due to concussion.

Notes: Ages listed are as of the first tour match on 3 June. Player positions are per the Lions' website. Bold denotes that the player was selected for a previous Lions squad. Italic denotes a player that withdrew from the squad following selection.

| Player | Position | Date of birth (age) | National team | Club/province | National caps (Lions tests) | Notes |
|---|---|---|---|---|---|---|
| **Rory Best** | Hooker | 15 August 1982 (aged 34) | Ireland | Ulster | 104 | |
| Kristian Dacey | Hooker | 25 July 1989 (aged 27) | Wales | Cardiff Blues | 4 | Called up as cover |
| Jamie George | Hooker | 20 October 1990 (aged 26) | England | Saracens | 17 | |
| Ken Owens | Hooker | 3 January 1987 (aged 30) | Wales | Scarlets | 50 | |
| Allan Dell | Prop | 16 March 1992 (aged 25) | Scotland | Edinburgh | 9 | Called up as cover |
| **Dan Cole** | Prop | 9 May 1987 (aged 30) | England | Leicester Tigers | 74 (3) | |
| Tomas Francis | Prop | 27 April 1992 (aged 25) | Wales | Exeter Chiefs | 23 | Called up as cover |
| Tadhg Furlong | Prop | 14 November 1992 (aged 24) | Ireland | Leinster | 16 | |
| Joe Marler | Prop | 7 July 1990 (aged 26) | England | Harlequins | 51 | |
| Jack McGrath | Prop | 11 October 1989 (aged 27) | Ireland | Leinster | 41 | |
| Kyle Sinckler | Prop | 30 March 1993 (aged 24) | England | Harlequins | 8 | |
| **Mako Vunipola** | Prop | 13 January 1991 (aged 26) | England | Saracens | 42 (3) | |
| Iain Henderson | Second row / Back row | 21 February 1992 (aged 25) | Ireland | Ulster | 32 | |
| Cory Hill | Second row | 10 February 1992 (aged 25) | Wales | Dragons | 6 | Called up as cover |
| Maro Itoje | Second row / Back row | 28 October 1994 (aged 22) | England | Saracens | 12 | |
| **Alun Wyn Jones** | Second row | 19 September 1985 (aged 31) | Wales | Ospreys | 110 (6) | |
| George Kruis | Second row | 22 February 1990 (aged 27) | England | Saracens | 20 | |
| Courtney Lawes | Second row | 23 February 1989 (aged 28) | England | Northampton Saints | 58 | |
| **Taulupe Faletau** | Back row | 12 November 1990 (aged 26) | Wales | Bath | 66 (1) | |
| James Haskell | Back row | 18 April 1985 (aged 32) | England | Wasps | 75 | Replaced Billy Vunipola |
| Ross Moriarty | Back row | 18 April 1994 (aged 23) | Wales | Gloucester | 17 | Withdrew due to injury sustained during tour |
| **Seán O'Brien** | Back row | 14 February 1987 (aged 30) | Ireland | Leinster | 49 (2) | |
| Peter O'Mahony | Back row | 17 September 1989 (aged 27) | Ireland | Munster | 40 | |
| CJ Stander | Back row | 5 April 1990 (aged 27) | Ireland | Munster | 15 | |
| **Justin Tipuric** | Back row | 6 August 1989 (aged 27) | Wales | Ospreys | 51 (1) | |
| **Sam Warburton** (c) | Back row | 5 October 1988 (aged 28) | Wales | Cardiff Blues | 73 (2) | |
| Billy Vunipola | Back row | 3 November 1992 (aged 24) | England | Saracens | 34 | Withdrew due to injury before tour |
| Gareth Davies | Scrum-half | 18 August 1990 (aged 26) | Wales | Scarlets | 25 | Called up as cover |
| Greig Laidlaw | Scrum half | 12 October 1985 (aged 31) | Scotland | Gloucester | 58 | Replaced Ben Youngs |
| **Conor Murray** | Scrum half | 20 April 1989 (aged 28) | Ireland | Munster | 58 (2) | |
| Rhys Webb | Scrum half | 9 December 1988 (aged 28) | Wales | Ospreys | 28 | |
| **Ben Youngs** | Scrum half | 5 September 1989 (aged 27) | England | Leicester Tigers | 70 (2) | Withdrew for personal reasons before tour |
| Dan Biggar | Fly half | 16 October 1989 (aged 27) | Wales | Ospreys | 56 | |
| **Owen Farrell** | Fly half / Centre | 24 September 1991 (aged 25) | England | Saracens | 52 (1) | |
| Finn Russell | Fly-half | 23 September 1992 (aged 24) | Scotland | Glasgow Warriors | 29 | Called up as cover |
| **Johnny Sexton** | Fly half | 11 July 1985 (aged 31) | Ireland | Leinster | 66 (3) | |
| **Jonathan Davies** | Centre | 5 April 1988 (aged 29) | Wales | Scarlets | 64 (3) | |
| Robbie Henshaw | Centre | 12 June 1993 (aged 23) | Ireland | Leinster | 24 | Withdrew due to injury sustained during tour |
| Jonathan Joseph | Centre | 21 May 1991 (aged 26) | England | Bath | 33 | |
| Jared Payne | Centre / Full back | 13 October 1985 (aged 31) | Ireland | Ulster | 20 | Withdrew due to injury sustained during tour |
| Ben Te'o | Centre | 27 January 1987 (aged 30) | England | Worcester Warriors | 8 | |
| Elliot Daly | Centre / Wing | 8 October 1992 (aged 24) | England | Wasps | 13 | |
| **George North** | Wing | 13 April 1992 (aged 25) | Wales | Northampton Saints | 69 (3) | Withdrew due to injury sustained during tour |
| Jack Nowell | Wing / Full back | 11 April 1993 (aged 24) | England | Exeter Chiefs | 23 | |
| Tommy Seymour | Wing | 1 July 1988 (aged 28) | Scotland | Glasgow Warriors | 36 | |
| Anthony Watson | Wing / Full back | 26 February 1994 (aged 23) | England | Bath | 26 | |
| **Leigh Halfpenny** | Full back / Wing | 22 December 1988 (aged 28) | Wales | Toulon | 71 (3) | |
| **Stuart Hogg** | Full back | 24 June 1992 (aged 24) | Scotland | Glasgow Warriors | 53 | Withdrew due to injury sustained during tour |
| Liam Williams | Full back / Wing | 9 April 1991 (aged 26) | Wales | Scarlets | 38 | |

==== Management and staff ====
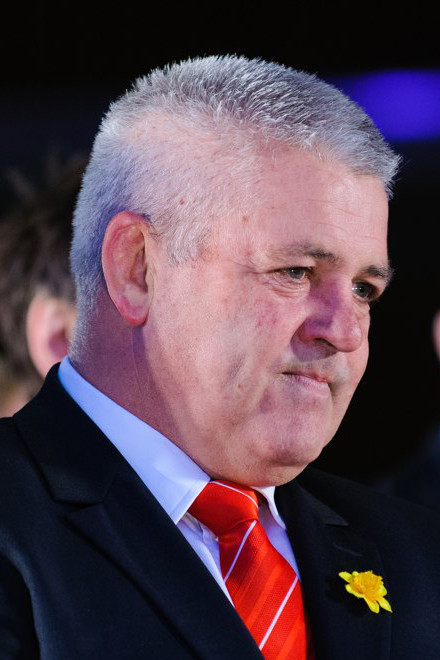
Warren Gatland

On 30 July 2014, former English international player John Spencer was named the Lions' tour manager.

On 7 September 2016, Warren Gatland was confirmed as the Lions' head coach and named his assistants on 7 December 2016 – Steve Borthwick, Andy Farrell and Rob Howley. Howley was on his fifth tour, having previously toured as a player (1997 and 2001) and coach (2009 and 2013). Borthwick was making his first tour as a Lions coach and Farrell was on his second, after being part of the coaching staff in 2013.

| Role | Name | |
Management
| Chief executive (CEO) | John Feehan | John Feehan |
| Chief operating officer (COO) | Charlie McEwen | Charlie McEwen |
| Chairman | Tom Grace | Tom Grace |
| Tour manager | John Spencer | John Spencer |
Coaching
| Role | Name | Union/Club |
| Head coach | Warren Gatland | Wales |
| Assistant coach (attack) | Rob Howley | Wales |
| Assistant coach (forwards) | Steve Borthwick | England |
| Assistant coach (defence) | Andy Farrell | Ireland |
| Assistant coach (kicking) | Neil Jenkins | Wales |
| Assistant coach (scrum) | Graham Rowntree | (England) Harlequins |
Performance staff
| Head analyst | Rhodri Bown | Wales |
| Sports scientist | Brian Cunniffe | Ireland |
| Head of strength & conditioning | Paul Stridgeon | (France) Toulon |
| Head of medical | Eanna Falvey | Ireland |
| Physiotherapist | Prav Mathema | Wales |
| Physiotherapist | Phil Pask | England |
| Physiotherapist | Bob Stewart | England |
| Masseur | Dave Redins | England |
| Masseur | Angela Rickard | Wales |
Operations
| Director of operations | Ger Carmody | Ger Carmody |
| Legal officer | Max Duthie | Max Duthie |
| Baggage master | Patrick O'Reilly | Patrick O'Reilly |
| Catering and nutrition | Dave Campbell | Dave Campbell |
| Head of communications | Dave Barton | Dave Barton |
| Communications manager | Luke Broadley | Luke Broadley |
| Communications manager | Christine Connolly | Christine Connolly |

=== New Zealand ===
New Zealand's 33-man squad for their Pasifika Challenge match against Samoa and their three-test series against the British & Irish Lions.

Liam Coltman, Vaea Fifita, Jack Goodhue, Akira Ioane and Matt Todd were also named in the squad as injury cover.

Following concussion to Ben Smith in the first test, Damian McKenzie was added to the squad as cover for Ben Smith.

On 3 July, Malakai Fekitoa was called up as a replacement for Sonny Bill Williams who was suspended after a red card in the second test.

All squad members play rugby in New Zealand.

Coaching team:

- Head coach: (New Zealand) Steve Hansen
- Attack coach: (New Zealand) Ian Foster
- Forwards coach: (New Zealand) Mike Cron
- Defence coach: (New Zealand) Wayne Smith

Note: Ages, caps and clubs as per first test match, 24 June 2017.

| Player | Position | Date of birth (age) | Caps | Franchise/province |
|---|---|---|---|---|
| Dane Coles | Hooker | 10 December 1986 (aged 30) | 49 | Hurricanes / Wellington |
| Liam Coltman | Hooker | 25 January 1990 (aged 27) | 1 | Highlanders / Otago |
| Nathan Harris | Hooker | 8 March 1992 (aged 25) | 5 | Chiefs / Bay of Plenty |
| Codie Taylor | Hooker | 31 March 1991 (aged 26) | 16 | Crusaders / Canterbury |
| Wyatt Crockett | Prop | 24 January 1983 (aged 34) | 59 | Crusaders / Canterbury |
| Charlie Faumuina | Prop | 24 December 1986 (aged 30) | 47 | Blues / Auckland |
| Owen Franks | Prop | 23 December 1987 (aged 29) | 91 | Crusaders / Canterbury |
| Joe Moody | Prop | 18 September 1988 (aged 28) | 25 | Crusaders / Canterbury |
| Ofa Tu'ungafasi | Prop | 19 April 1992 (aged 25) | 4 | Blues / Auckland |
| Scott Barrett | Lock | 20 November 1993 (aged 23) | 5 | Crusaders / Canterbury |
| Vaea Fifita | Lock | 17 June 1992 (aged 25) | 1 | Hurricanes / Wellington |
| Brodie Retallick | Lock | 31 May 1991 (aged 26) | 61 | Chiefs / Hawke's Bay |
| Luke Romano | Lock | 16 February 1986 (aged 31) | 26 | Crusaders / Canterbury |
| Sam Whitelock | Lock | 12 October 1988 (aged 28) | 85 | Crusaders / Canterbury |
| Sam Cane | Flanker | 13 January 1992 (aged 25) | 41 | Chiefs / Bay of Plenty |
| Jerome Kaino | Flanker | 6 April 1983 (aged 34) | 78 | Blues / Auckland |
| Ardie Savea | Flanker | 14 October 1993 (aged 23) | 13 | Hurricanes / Wellington |
| Liam Squire | Flanker | 20 March 1991 (aged 26) | 8 | Highlanders / Tasman |
| Matt Todd | Flanker | 24 March 1988 (aged 29) | 8 | Crusaders / Canterbury |
| Akira Ioane | Number 8 | 16 January 1995 (aged 22) | 0 | Blues / Auckland |
| Kieran Read (c) | Number 8 | 26 October 1985 (aged 31) | 97 | Crusaders / Canterbury |
| Tawera Kerr-Barlow | Half-back | 15 August 1990 (aged 26) | 25 | Chiefs / Waikato |
| TJ Perenara | Half-back | 23 January 1992 (aged 25) | 30 | Hurricanes / Wellington |
| Aaron Smith | Half-back | 21 November 1988 (aged 28) | 59 | Highlanders / Manawatu |
| Beauden Barrett | First five-eighth | 27 May 1991 (aged 26) | 50 | Hurricanes / Taranaki |
| Aaron Cruden | First five-eighth | 8 January 1989 (aged 28) | 47 | Chiefs / Manawatu |
| Lima Sopoaga | First five-eighth | 3 February 1991 (aged 26) | 7 | Highlanders / Southland |
| Ryan Crotty | Centre | 23 September 1988 (aged 28) | 26 | Crusaders / Canterbury |
| Malakai Fekitoa | Centre | 10 May 1992 (aged 25) | 23 | Highlanders / Auckland |
| Jack Goodhue | Centre | 13 June 1995 (aged 22) | 0 | Crusaders / Canterbury |
| Ngani Laumape | Centre | 22 April 1993 (aged 24) | 0 | Hurricanes / Manawatu |
| Anton Lienert-Brown | Centre | 15 April 1995 (aged 22) | 10 | Chiefs / Waikato |
| Sonny Bill Williams | Centre | 3 August 1985 (aged 31) | 34 | Blues / Waikato |
| Israel Dagg | Wing | 6 June 1988 (aged 29) | 62 | Crusaders / Hawke's Bay |
| Rieko Ioane | Wing | 18 March 1997 (aged 20) | 2 | Blues / Auckland |
| Waisake Naholo | Wing | 8 May 1991 (aged 26) | 12 | Highlanders / Taranaki |
| Julian Savea | Wing | 7 August 1990 (aged 26) | 53 | Hurricanes / Wellington |
| Jordie Barrett | Fullback | 15 February 1997 (aged 20) | 1 | Hurricanes / Taranaki |
| Damian McKenzie | Fullback | 25 April 1995 (aged 22) | 2 | Chiefs / Waikato |
| Ben Smith | Fullback | 1 June 1986 (aged 31) | 61 | Highlanders / Otago |

== Matches ==
=== Provincial games ===
As well as the test series, the Lions played tour matches against New Zealand provincial teams. For the first time since the establishment of Super Rugby, this included playing all five of New Zealand's Super Rugby teams. The current form of the Super Rugby teams made this tour arguably one of the toughest undertaken by a British & Irish Lions team.

The Lions arrived in New Zealand just two days before their first match against a Provincial Barbarians team. The Barbarian team was made up of players on the fringe of New Zealand Super Rugby teams, and included Bryn Gatland, son of Lions coach Warren Gatland. The Barbarians led 7–3 at half time, before Anthony Watson scored for the visitors to give them the lead with 30 minutes to go. They held on to open the tour with an unconvincing 13–7 victory.

The next match was four days later against the Blues, an Auckland-based Super Rugby franchise. The Lions led 16–15 with 10 minutes remaining before a Sonny Bill Williams break and offload to Ihaia West led to the match-winning try. A try-less 12–3 victory over the Crusaders in Christchurch followed. This was the first time the Crusaders had lost in 2017. It was another close game against the Highlanders, and Marty Banks from the Otago-based side kicked the winning penalty with six minutes remaining.

The next match was against the Māori All Blacks, a team made up of players with Maori ancestry. A strong squad was named, with nine players with All Black caps selected. The Lions beat the Maori team with ease in what was predicted to be the toughest match before meeting the All Blacks. The convincing 32–10 victory was followed up three days later as they put another dominant display against the Chiefs in Hamilton, winning 34–6. The final mid-week game against the Hurricanes was played after the first All Black test match. The Hurricanes came from behind to secure a 31–31 draw in Wellington.

3 June 2017
19:35 NZST (UTC+12)

| New Zealand Provincial Barbarians | 7–13 | British & Irish Lions |
| Try: Anderson-Heather 22' c Con: Gatland (1/1) 23' | Report | Try: Watson 51' c Con: Farrell (1/1) 53'; Pen: Sexton (1/2) 16'; Laidlaw (1/1) 42' |

Okara Park, Whangārei
Attendance: 19,951
Referee: Angus Gardner (Australia)

Team details

| FB | 15 | Luteru Laulala |
| RW | 14 | Sam Vaka |
| OC | 13 | Inga Finau | (substituted off) 18' |
| IC | 12 | Dwayne Sweeney |
| LW | 11 | Sevu Reece |
| FH | 10 | Bryn Gatland | (substituted off) 60' |
| SH | 9 | Jack Stratton | (substituted off) 55' |
| N8 | 8 | Mitchell Dunshea |
| OF | 7 | Lachlan Boshier | (substituted off) 46' |
| BF | 6 | James Tucker | | (substituted off) 66' |
| RL | 5 | Keepa Mewett | (substituted off) 61' | (substituted on) 66' |
| LL | 4 | Josh Goodhue |
| TP | 3 | Oliver Jager | (substituted off) 60' |
| HK | 2 | Sam Anderson-Heather (c) | (substituted off) 42' |
| LP | 1 | Aidan Ross | (substituted off) 51' |
Replacements:
| HK | 16 | Andrew Makalio | (substituted on) 42' |
| PR | 17 | Tolu Fahamokioa | (substituted on) 51' |
| PR | 18 | Marcel Renata | (substituted on) 60' |
| FL | 19 | Matt Matich | (substituted on) 46' |
| N8 | 20 | Peter Rowe | (substituted on) 61' |
| SH | 21 | Richard Judd | (substituted on) 55' |
| WG | 22 | Jonah Lowe | (substituted on) 18' |
| CE | 23 | Joe Webber | (substituted on) 60' |
Coach:
(New Zealand) Clayton McMillan

| FB | 15 | (Scotland) Stuart Hogg |
| RW | 14 | (England) Anthony Watson |
| OC | 13 | (England) Jonathan Joseph |
| IC | 12 | (England) Ben Te'o |
| LW | 11 | (Scotland) Tommy Seymour |
| FH | 10 | (Ireland) Johnny Sexton | (substituted off) 49' |
| SH | 9 | (Scotland) Greig Laidlaw | (substituted off) 59' |
| N8 | 8 | (Wales) Taulupe Faletau |
| OF | 7 | (Wales) Sam Warburton (c) | (substituted off) 67' |
| BF | 6 | (Wales) Ross Moriarty |
| RL | 5 | (Ireland) Iain Henderson | (substituted off) 51' |
| LL | 4 | (Wales) Alun Wyn Jones |
| TP | 3 | (England) Kyle Sinckler | (substituted off) 51' |
| HK | 2 | (Ireland) Rory Best | (substituted off) 51' |
| LP | 1 | (England) Joe Marler | (substituted off) 51' |
Replacements:
| HK | 16 | (England) Jamie George | (substituted on) 51' |
| PR | 17 | (England) Mako Vunipola | (substituted on) 51' |
| PR | 18 | (Ireland) Tadhg Furlong | (substituted on) 51' |
| LK | 19 | (England) George Kruis | (substituted on) 51' |
| FL | 20 | (Wales) Justin Tipuric | (substituted on) 67' |
| SH | 21 | (Wales) Rhys Webb | (substituted on) 59' |
| FH | 22 | (England) Owen Farrell | (substituted on) 49' |
| CE | 23 | (England) Elliot Daly |
Coach:
(New Zealand) Warren Gatland

Man of the Match:
Taulupe Faletau (British & Irish Lions)

Touch judges:
Mike Fraser (New Zealand)
Brendon Pickerill (New Zealand)
Television match official:
Aaron Paterson (New Zealand)

7 June 2017
19:35 NZST (UTC+12)

| Blues | 22–16 | British & Irish Lions |
| Try: R. Ioane 6' m Williams 40+3' c West 73' c Con: Perofeta (1/2) 40'+5; West (1/1) 74'; Pen: West (1/1) 52' | Report | Try: Stander 17' c Con: Halfpenny (1/1) 18'; Pen: Halfpenny (3/3) 25', 65', 70' |

Eden Park, Auckland
Attendance: 40,639
Referee: Pascal Gaüzère (France)

Team details

| FB | 15 | Michael Collins |
| RW | 14 | Matt Duffie | (substituted off) 40+1' | (substituted on) 41' |
| OC | 13 | George Moala | | | (substituted off) 65' |
| IC | 12 | Sonny Bill Williams |
| LW | 11 | Rieko Ioane |
| FH | 10 | Stephen Perofeta | (substituted off) 51' |
| SH | 9 | Augustine Pulu | (substituted off) 71' |
| N8 | 8 | Steve Luatua |
| OF | 7 | Blake Gibson | (substituted off) 65' |
| BF | 6 | Akira Ioane |
| RL | 5 | Scott Scrafton |
| LL | 4 | Gerard Cowley-Tuioti | (substituted off) 57' |
| TP | 3 | Charlie Faumuina | (substituted off) 57' |
| HK | 2 | James Parsons (c) | (substituted off) 71' |
| LP | 1 | Ofa Tu'ungafasi | (substituted off) 57' |
Replacements:
| HK | 16 | Epalahame Faiva | (substituted on) 71' |
| PR | 17 | Alex Hodgman | (substituted on) 57' |
| PR | 18 | Sione Mafileo | (substituted on) 57' |
| LK | 19 | Jimmy Tupou | (substituted on) 57' |
| FL | 20 | Kara Pryor | (substituted on) 65' |
| SH | 21 | Sam Nock | (substituted on) 71' |
| FH | 22 | Ihaia West | (substituted on) 51' |
| CE | 23 | TJ Faiane | (substituted on) 40+1' | (substituted off) 41' | (substituted on) 65' |
Coach:
(New Zealand) Tana Umaga

| FB | 15 | (Wales) Leigh Halfpenny |
| RW | 14 | (England) Jack Nowell |
| OC | 13 | (Ireland) Jared Payne | | (substituted off) 47' |
| IC | 12 | (Ireland) Robbie Henshaw |
| LW | 11 | (England) Elliot Daly |
| FH | 10 | (Wales) Dan Biggar | | (substituted off) 35' |
| SH | 9 | (Wales) Rhys Webb | | (substituted off) 75' |
| N8 | 8 | (Ireland) CJ Stander |
| OF | 7 | (Wales) Justin Tipuric |
| BF | 6 | (England) James Haskell | | (substituted off) 53' |
| RL | 5 | (England) Courtney Lawes | | (substituted off) 75' |
| LL | 4 | (England) Maro Itoje |
| TP | 3 | (England) Dan Cole | | (substituted off) 54' |
| HK | 2 | (Wales) Ken Owens (c) | | (substituted off) 68' |
| LP | 1 | (Ireland) Jack McGrath | | (substituted off) 53' |
Replacements:
| HK | 16 | (Ireland) Rory Best | | (substituted on) 68' |
| PR | 17 | (England) Joe Marler | | (substituted on) 53' |
| PR | 18 | (England) Kyle Sinckler | | (substituted on) 54' |
| LK | 19 | (Ireland) Iain Henderson | | (substituted on) 75' |
| FL | 20 | (Ireland) Peter O'Mahony | | (substituted on) 53' |
| SH | 21 | (Scotland) Greig Laidlaw | | (substituted on) 75' |
| FH | 22 | (Ireland) Johnny Sexton | | (substituted on) 35' |
| FB | 23 | (Wales) Liam Williams | (yellow card) 56' to 66' | (substituted on) 47' |
Coach:
(New Zealand) Warren Gatland

Man of the Match:
Sonny Bill Williams (Blues)

Touch judges:
Mathieu Raynal (France)
Angus Gardner (Australia)
Television match official:
Marius Jonker (South Africa)

10 June 2017
19:35 NZST (UTC+12)

| Crusaders | 3–12 | British & Irish Lions |
| Pen: Mo'unga (1/1) 24' | Report | Pen: Farrell (4/5) 12', 16', 30', 70' |

Rugby League Park, Christchurch
Attendance: 20,497
Referee: Mathieu Raynal (France)

Team details

| FB | 15 | Israel Dagg |
| RW | 14 | Seta Tamanivalu |
| OC | 13 | Jack Goodhue |
| IC | 12 | David Havili |
| LW | 11 | George Bridge | (substituted off) 65' |
| FH | 10 | Richie Mo'unga | (substituted off) 73' |
| SH | 9 | Bryn Hall | (substituted off) 61' |
| N8 | 8 | Jordan Taufua |
| OF | 7 | Matt Todd |
| BF | 6 | Heiden Bedwell-Curtis | (substituted off) 61' |
| RL | 5 | Sam Whitelock (c) |
| LL | 4 | Luke Romano | (substituted off) 55' |
| TP | 3 | Owen Franks | (substituted off) 50' |
| HK | 2 | Codie Taylor | (substituted off) 50' |
| LP | 1 | Joe Moody | (substituted off) 50' |
Replacements:
| HK | 16 | Ben Funnell | (substituted on) 50' |
| PR | 17 | Wyatt Crockett | (substituted on) 50' |
| PR | 18 | Michael Alaalatoa | (substituted on) 50' |
| LK | 19 | Quinten Strange | (substituted on) 55' |
| FL | 20 | Jed Brown | (substituted on) 61' |
| SH | 21 | Mitchell Drummond | (substituted on) 61' |
| FH | 22 | Mitchell Hunt | (substituted on) 73' |
| CE | 23 | Tim Bateman | (substituted on) 65' |
Coach:
(New Zealand) Scott Robertson

| FB | 15 | (Scotland) Stuart Hogg | (substituted off) 19' |
| RW | 14 | (Wales) George North |
| OC | 13 | (Wales) Jonathan Davies | (substituted off) 28' |
| IC | 12 | (England) Ben Te'o |
| LW | 11 | (Wales) Liam Williams |
| FH | 10 | (England) Owen Farrell |
| SH | 9 | (Ireland) Conor Murray |
| N8 | 8 | (Wales) Taulupe Faletau |
| OF | 7 | (Ireland) Seán O'Brien | (substituted off) 55' |
| BF | 6 | (Ireland) Peter O'Mahony |
| RL | 5 | (England) George Kruis | (substituted off) 61' |
| LL | 4 | (Wales) Alun Wyn Jones (c) |
| TP | 3 | (Ireland) Tadhg Furlong | (substituted off) 65' |
| HK | 2 | (England) Jamie George | (substituted off) 65' |
| LP | 1 | (England) Mako Vunipola | (substituted off) 61' |
Replacements:
| HK | 16 | (Wales) Ken Owens | (substituted on) 65' |
| PR | 17 | (Ireland) Jack McGrath | (substituted on) 61' |
| PR | 18 | (England) Dan Cole | (substituted on) 65' |
| LK | 19 | (England) Maro Itoje | (substituted on) 61' |
| N8 | 20 | (Ireland) CJ Stander | (substituted on) 55' |
| SH | 21 | (Wales) Rhys Webb |
| FH | 22 | (Ireland) Johnny Sexton | (substituted on) 28' |
| WG | 23 | (England) Anthony Watson | (substituted on) 19' |
Coach:
(New Zealand) Warren Gatland

Man of the Match:
Conor Murray (British & Irish Lions)

Touch judges:
Angus Gardner (Australia)
Pascal Gaüzère (France)
Television match official:
Marius Jonker (South Africa)

13 June 2017
19:35 NZST (UTC+12)

| Highlanders | 23–22 | British & Irish Lions |
| Try: Naholo 25' c Coltman 59' c Con: Sopoaga (1/1) 26'; Banks (1/1) 61'; Pen: Sopoaga (2/3) 4', 49'; Banks (1/1) 73' | Report | Try: Joseph 29' c Seymour 42' m Warburton 52' c Con: Biggar (2/3) 30', 53'; Pen: Biggar (1/2) 15' |

Forsyth Barr Stadium, Dunedin
Attendance: 29,620
Referee: Angus Gardner (Australia)

Team details

| FB | 15 | Richard Buckman |
| RW | 14 | Waisake Naholo |
| OC | 13 | Malakai Fekitoa | (substituted off) 11' | (substituted on) 15' |
| IC | 12 | Teihorangi Walden |
| LW | 11 | Tevita Li | (substituted off) 67' |
| FH | 10 | Lima Sopoaga | | | (substituted off) 54' |
| SH | 9 | Kayne Hammington | (substituted off) 74' |
| N8 | 8 | Luke Whitelock (c) |
| OF | 7 | Dillon Hunt | (substituted off) 58' |
| BF | 6 | Gareth Evans |
| RL | 5 | Jackson Hemopo |
| LL | 4 | Alex Ainley | (substituted off) 54' |
| TP | 3 | Siate Tokolahi | (substituted off) 67' |
| HK | 2 | Liam Coltman | (substituted off) 67' |
| LP | 1 | Daniel Lienert-Brown | (substituted off) 58' |
Replacements:
| HK | 16 | Greg Pleasants-Tate | (substituted on) 67' |
| PR | 17 | Aki Seiuli | (substituted on) 58' |
| PR | 18 | Siua Halanukonuka | (substituted on) 67' |
| LK | 19 | Josh Dickson | (substituted on) 54' |
| FL | 20 | James Lentjes | (substituted on) 58' |
| SH | 21 | Josh Renton | (substituted on) 74' |
| FH | 22 | Marty Banks | (substituted on) 11' | (substituted off) 15' | (substituted on) 54' |
| WG | 23 | Patrick Osborne | (substituted on) 67' |
Coach:
(New Zealand) Scott McLeod

| FB | 15 | (Ireland) Jared Payne | (substituted off) 62' |
| RW | 14 | (England) Jack Nowell |
| OC | 13 | (England) Jonathan Joseph |
| IC | 12 | (Ireland) Robbie Henshaw |
| LW | 11 | (Scotland) Tommy Seymour |
| FH | 10 | (Wales) Dan Biggar | (substituted off) 67' |
| SH | 9 | (Wales) Rhys Webb | (substituted off) 47' |
| N8 | 8 | (Ireland) CJ Stander |
| OF | 7 | (Wales) Sam Warburton (c) | (substituted off) 67' |
| BF | 6 | (England) James Haskell |
| RL | 5 | (Ireland) Iain Henderson |
| LL | 4 | (England) Courtney Lawes | (substituted off) 26' |
| TP | 3 | (England) Kyle Sinckler | (substituted off) 48' |
| HK | 2 | (Ireland) Rory Best | 24' to 28' | | (substituted off) 48' |
| LP | 1 | (England) Joe Marler | (substituted off) 54' |
Replacements:
| HK | 16 | (Wales) Ken Owens | (substituted on) 24' | (substituted off) 28' | (substituted on) 48' |
| PR | 17 | (Ireland) Jack McGrath | (substituted on) 54' |
| PR | 18 | (England) Dan Cole | (substituted on) 48' |
| LK | 19 | (Wales) Alun Wyn Jones | (substituted on) 26' |
| FL | 20 | (Wales) Justin Tipuric | (substituted on) 67' |
| SH | 21 | (Scotland) Greig Laidlaw | (substituted on) 47' |
| FH | 22 | (England) Owen Farrell | (substituted on) 67' |
| CE | 23 | (England) Elliot Daly | (substituted on) 62' |
Coach:
(New Zealand) Warren Gatland

Man of the Match:
Waisake Naholo (Highlanders)

Touch judges:
Pascal Gaüzère (France)
Mathieu Raynal (France)
Television match official:
Marius Jonker (South Africa)

17 June 2017
19:35 NZST (UTC+12)

| Māori All Blacks | 10–32 | British & Irish Lions |
| Try: Messam 12' c Con: McKenzie (1/1) 13'; Pen: McKenzie (1/2) 22' | Report | Try: Penalty try 51'; Itoje 54'c Con: Halfpenny (1/1) 56'; Pen: Halfpenny (6/6) 5', 10', 20', 33', 44', 70' |

Rotorua International Stadium, Rotorua
Attendance: 28,177
Referee: Jaco Peyper (South Africa)

Team details

| FB | 15 | James Lowe |
| RW | 14 | Nehe Milner-Skudder |
| OC | 13 | Matt Proctor | | (substituted off) 54' |
| IC | 12 | Charlie Ngatai |
| LW | 11 | Rieko Ioane |
| FH | 10 | Damian McKenzie | | (substituted off) 67' |
| SH | 9 | Tawera Kerr-Barlow | (yellow card) 48' to 58' | (substituted off) 74' |
| N8 | 8 | Liam Messam |
| OF | 7 | Elliot Dixon | | (substituted off) 72' |
| BF | 6 | Akira Ioane |
| RL | 5 | Tom Franklin |
| LL | 4 | Joe Wheeler | | (substituted off) 70' |
| TP | 3 | Ben May | | (substituted off) 70' |
| HK | 2 | Ash Dixon (c) | | (substituted off) 70' |
| LP | 1 | Kane Hames | | (substituted off) 62' |
Replacements:
| HK | 16 | Hikawera Elliot | | (substituted on) 70' |
| PR | 17 | Chris Eves | | (substituted on) 62' |
| PR | 18 | Marcel Renata | | (substituted on) 70' |
| LK | 19 | Leighton Price | | (substituted on) 70' |
| FL | 20 | Kara Pryor | | (substituted on) 72' |
| SH | 21 | Bryn Hall | | (substituted on) 74' |
| FH | 22 | Ihaia West | | (substituted on) 67' |
| CE | 23 | Rob Thompson | | (substituted on) 54' |
Coach:
(New Zealand) Colin Cooper

| FB | 15 | (Wales) Leigh Halfpenny |
| RW | 14 | (England) Anthony Watson |
| OC | 13 | (Wales) Jonathan Davies |
| IC | 12 | (England) Ben Te'o |
| LW | 11 | (Wales) George North | (substituted off) 64' |
| FH | 10 | (Ireland) Johnny Sexton | (substituted off) 67' |
| SH | 9 | (Ireland) Conor Murray | (substituted off) 67' |
| N8 | 8 | (Wales) Taulupe Faletau |
| OF | 7 | (Ireland) Seán O'Brien |
| BF | 6 | (Ireland) Peter O'Mahony (c) | (substituted off) 64' |
| RL | 5 | (England) George Kruis | (substituted off) 60' |
| LL | 4 | (England) Maro Itoje |
| TP | 3 | (Ireland) Tadhg Furlong | (substituted off) 65' |
| HK | 2 | (England) Jamie George | (substituted off) 65' |
| LP | 1 | (England) Mako Vunipola | (substituted off) 60' |
Replacements:
| HK | 16 | (Wales) Ken Owens | (substituted on) 65' |
| PR | 17 | (Ireland) Jack McGrath | (substituted on) 60' |
| PR | 18 | (England) Kyle Sinckler | (substituted on) 65' |
| LK | 19 | (Ireland) Iain Henderson | (substituted on) 60' |
| FL | 20 | (Wales) Sam Warburton | (substituted on) 64' |
| SH | 21 | (Scotland) Greig Laidlaw | (substituted on) 67' |
| FH | 22 | (Wales) Dan Biggar | (substituted on) 67' |
| CE | 23 | (England) Elliot Daly | (substituted on) 64' |
Coach:
(New Zealand) Warren Gatland

Man of the Match:
Maro Itoje (British & Irish Lions)

Touch judges:
Jérôme Garcès (France)
Romain Poite (France)
Television match official:
Ian Smith (Australia)

20 June 2017
19:35 NZST (UTC+12)

| Chiefs | 6–34 | British & Irish Lions |
| Pen: Donald (2/2) 21', 40' | Report | Try: Nowell (2) 24' c, 58' c Penalty try 53'; Payne 63' c Con: Biggar (3/3) 25', 59', 64'; Pen: Biggar (2/2) 9', 17' |

Waikato Stadium, Hamilton
Attendance: 29,974
Referee: Jérôme Garcès (France)

Team details

| FB | 15 | Shaun Stevenson |
| RW | 14 | Toni Pulu | | (substituted off) 12' |
| OC | 13 | Tim Nanai-Williams |
| IC | 12 | Johnny Fa'auli |
| LW | 11 | Solomon Alaimalo | | (substituted off) 65' |
| FH | 10 | Stephen Donald (c) |
| SH | 9 | Finlay Christie | | (substituted off) 57' |
| N8 | 8 | Tom Sanders | | (substituted off) 54' |
| OF | 7 | Lachlan Boshier |
| BF | 6 | Mitchell Brown | (yellow card) 54' to 64' |
| RL | 5 | Michael Allardice | | (substituted off) 64' |
| LL | 4 | Dominic Bird |
| TP | 3 | Nepo Laulala | | (substituted off) 64' |
| HK | 2 | Liam Polwart | | (substituted off) 59' |
| LP | 1 | Siegfried Fisiihoi | | (substituted off) 64' |
Replacements:
| HK | 16 | Hika Elliot | | (substituted on) 59' |
| PR | 17 | Aidan Ross | | (substituted on) 64' |
| PR | 18 | Atunaisa Moli | | (substituted on) 64' |
| FL | 19 | Liam Messam | | (substituted on) 54' |
| FL | 20 | Mitchell Karpik | | (substituted on) 64' |
| SH | 21 | Jonathan Taumateine | | (substituted on) 57' |
| FH | 22 | Luteru Laulala | | (substituted on) 65' |
| WG | 23 | Chase Tiatia | | (substituted on) 12' |
Coach:
(New Zealand) Dave Rennie

| FB | 15 | (Wales) Liam Williams |
| RW | 14 | (England) Jack Nowell |
| OC | 13 | (Ireland) Jared Payne | | | (substituted off) 76' |
| IC | 12 | (Ireland) Robbie Henshaw |
| LW | 11 | (England) Elliot Daly | | (substituted off) 59' | (substituted on) 76' |
| FH | 10 | (Wales) Dan Biggar |
| SH | 9 | (Scotland) Greig Laidlaw |
| N8 | 8 | (Ireland) CJ Stander |
| OF | 7 | (Wales) Justin Tipuric |
| BF | 6 | (England) James Haskell | | (substituted off) 13' | (substituted on) 23' |
| RL | 5 | (England) Courtney Lawes | | (substituted off) 51' | (substituted on) 57' |
| LL | 4 | (Ireland) Iain Henderson |
| TP | 3 | (England) Dan Cole |
| HK | 2 | (Ireland) Rory Best (c) |
| LP | 1 | (England) Joe Marler | (yellow card) 12' to 22' |
Replacements:
| HK | 16 | (Wales) Kristian Dacey |
| PR | 17 | (Scotland) Allan Dell | | (substituted on) 13' | (substituted off) 23' |
| PR | 18 | (Wales) Tomas Francis |
| LK | 19 | (Wales) Cory Hill |
| LK | 20 | (Wales) Alun Wyn Jones | | (substituted on) 51' | (substituted off) 57' |
| SH | 21 | (Wales) Gareth Davies |
| FH | 22 | (Scotland) Finn Russell |
| WG | 23 | (Scotland) Tommy Seymour | | (substituted on) 59' |
Coach:
(New Zealand) Warren Gatland

Man of the Match:
Jack Nowell (British & Irish Lions)

Touch judges:
Jaco Peyper (South Africa)
Romain Poite (France)
Television match official:
Ian Smith (Australia)

27 June 2017
19:35 NZST (UTC+12)

| Hurricanes | 31–31 | British & Irish Lions |
| Try: Gibbins 26' c Laumape 40' c Goosen 67' c Fifita 70' c Con: Barrett (4/4) 28', 42', 67', 70'; Pen: Barrett 49' | Report | Try: Seymour (2) 17' c, 54' m North 35' c Con: Biggar (2/3) 18', 37'; Pen: Biggar (4/4) 9', 21', 30', 51' |

Wellington Regional Stadium, Wellington
Attendance: 38,690
Referee: Romain Poite (France)

Team details

| FB | 15 | Jordie Barrett |
| RW | 14 | Nehe Milner-Skudder |
| OC | 13 | Vince Aso |
| IC | 12 | Ngani Laumape |
| LW | 11 | Julian Savea | | (substituted off) 69' |
| FH | 10 | Otere Black | | (substituted off) 62' |
| SH | 9 | Te Toiroa Tahuriorangi | (yellow card) 51' to 62' | (substituted off) 69' |
| N8 | 8 | Brad Shields (c) | | (substituted off) 56' |
| OF | 7 | Callum Gibbins |
| BF | 6 | Vaea Fifita |
| RL | 5 | Sam Lousi |
| LL | 4 | Mark Abbott |
| TP | 3 | Jeffery Toomaga-Allen |
| HK | 2 | Ricky Riccitelli | | (substituted off) 62' |
| LP | 1 | Ben May | | (substituted off) 56' |
Replacements:
| HK | 16 | Leni Apisai | | (substituted on) 62' |
| PR | 17 | Chris Eves | | (substituted on) 56' |
| PR | 18 | Mike Kainga |
| LK | 19 | James Blackwell |
| FL | 20 | Reed Prinsep | | (substituted on) 56' |
| SH | 21 | Kemara Hauiti-Parapara | | (substituted on) 69' |
| CE | 22 | Wes Goosen | | (substituted on) 62' |
| WG | 23 | Cory Jane | | (substituted on) 69' |
Coach:
(New Zealand) Chris Boyd

| FB | 15 | (England) Jack Nowell |
| RW | 14 | (Scotland) Tommy Seymour |
| OC | 13 | (England) Jonathan Joseph |
| IC | 12 | (Ireland) Robbie Henshaw | | (substituted off) 19' |
| LW | 11 | (Wales) George North |
| FH | 10 | (Wales) Dan Biggar | | (substituted off) 43' | (substituted on) 48' |
| SH | 9 | (Scotland) Greig Laidlaw |
| N8 | 8 | (Ireland) CJ Stander |
| OF | 7 | (Wales) Justin Tipuric |
| BF | 6 | (England) James Haskell |
| RL | 5 | (England) Courtney Lawes | | (substituted off) 54' |
| LL | 4 | (Ireland) Iain Henderson | (yellow card) 66' to 77' |
| TP | 3 | (England) Dan Cole |
| HK | 2 | (Ireland) Rory Best (c) |
| LP | 1 | (England) Joe Marler |
Replacements:
| HK | 16 | (Wales) Kristian Dacey |
| PR | 17 | (Scotland) Allan Dell |
| PR | 18 | (Wales) Tomas Francis |
| LK | 19 | (Wales) Cory Hill |
| LK | 20 | (England) George Kruis | | (substituted on) 54' |
| SH | 21 | (Wales) Gareth Davies |
| FH | 22 | (Scotland) Finn Russell | | (substituted on) 43' | (substituted off) 48' |
| FB | 23 | (Wales) Leigh Halfpenny | | (substituted on) 19' |
Coach:
(New Zealand) Warren Gatland

Man of the Match:
Jordie Barrett (Hurricanes)

Touch judges:
Jaco Peyper (South Africa)
Jérôme Garcès (France)
Television match official:
George Ayoub (Australia)

=== Test matches ===
New Zealand were favourites, coming into the first test match having won 46 tests in a row at home and undefeated at Eden Park in 23 years. Peter O'Mahony was named Lions captain by Warren Gatland for the first test. Sam Warburton was on the bench for the opener in Auckland, which ended 30-15 to the hosts, due to having suffered an ankle injury against the Provincial Barbarians and still working up to full fitness, making him the first tour captain not to play in the first test in 87 years. Apart from a new-look back three of Anthony Watson, Liam Williams and Elliot Daly, Gatland picked a predictable squad. So too did All Blacks coach Steve Hansen, his only surprise being the elevation of 20-year-old Rieko Ioane for his first start over the veteran winger Julian Savea.

==== First test ====
The first test was a close match during the first half, Codie Taylor's try for the All Blacks being matched by one from the Lions' Seán O'Brien, and the home side led 13–8 at the break; however in the second half Rieko Ioane's two tries took the game away from the Lions, with Rhys Webb's try bringing the score back to 30–15.

24 June 2017
19:35 NZST (UTC+12)

| New Zealand | 30–15 | British & Irish Lions |
| Try: Taylor 17' c Ioane (2) 54' c, 69' c Con: B. Barrett (3/3) 19', 55', 71'; Pen: B. Barrett (3/3) 13', 33', 60' | Report | Try: O'Brien 35' m Webb 80' c Con: Farrell (1/2) 80'; Pen: Farrell (1/1) 30' |

Eden Park, Auckland
Attendance: 48,181
Referee: Jaco Peyper (South Africa)

| FB | 15 | Ben Smith | (substituted off) 26' |
| RW | 14 | Israel Dagg |
| OC | 13 | Ryan Crotty | (substituted off) 33' |
| IC | 12 | Sonny Bill Williams |
| LW | 11 | Rieko Ioane |
| FH | 10 | Beauden Barrett |
| SH | 9 | Aaron Smith | (substituted off) 55' |
| N8 | 8 | Kieran Read (c) | (substituted off) 76' |
| OF | 7 | Sam Cane |
| BF | 6 | Jerome Kaino | (substituted off) 46' |
| RL | 5 | Sam Whitelock |
| LL | 4 | Brodie Retallick |
| TP | 3 | Owen Franks | (substituted off) 53' |
| HK | 2 | Codie Taylor | (substituted off) 66' |
| LP | 1 | Joe Moody | (substituted off) 53' |
Replacements:
| HK | 16 | Nathan Harris | (substituted on) 66' |
| PR | 17 | Wyatt Crockett | (substituted on) 53' |
| PR | 18 | Charlie Faumuina | (substituted on) 53' |
| LK | 19 | Scott Barrett | (substituted on) 76' |
| FL | 20 | Ardie Savea | (substituted on) 46' |
| SH | 21 | TJ Perenara | (substituted on) 55' |
| FH | 22 | Aaron Cruden | (substituted on) 26' |
| CE | 23 | Anton Lienert-Brown | (substituted on) 33' |
Coach:
Steve Hansen

| FB | 15 | (Wales) Liam Williams | (substituted off) 71' |
| RW | 14 | (England) Anthony Watson |
| OC | 13 | (Wales) Jonathan Davies |
| IC | 12 | (England) Ben Te'o | (substituted off) 56' |
| LW | 11 | (England) Elliot Daly |
| FH | 10 | (England) Owen Farrell |
| SH | 9 | (Ireland) Conor Murray | (substituted off) 67' |
| N8 | 8 | (Wales) Taulupe Faletau |
| OF | 7 | (Ireland) Seán O'Brien |
| BF | 6 | (Ireland) Peter O'Mahony (c) | (substituted off) 53' |
| RL | 5 | (England) George Kruis |
| LL | 4 | (Wales) Alun Wyn Jones | (substituted off) 47' |
| TP | 3 | (Ireland) Tadhg Furlong | (substituted off) 58' |
| HK | 2 | (England) Jamie George | (substituted off) 67' |
| LP | 1 | (England) Mako Vunipola | (substituted off) 51' |
Replacements:
| HK | 16 | (Wales) Ken Owens | (substituted on) 67' |
| PR | 17 | (Ireland) Jack McGrath | (substituted on) 51' |
| PR | 18 | (England) Kyle Sinckler | (substituted on) 58' |
| LK | 19 | (England) Maro Itoje | (substituted on) 47' |
| FL | 20 | (Wales) Sam Warburton | (substituted on) 53' |
| SH | 21 | (Wales) Rhys Webb | (substituted on) 67' |
| FH | 22 | (Ireland) Johnny Sexton | (substituted on) 56' |
| FB | 23 | (Wales) Leigh Halfpenny | (substituted on) 71' |
Coach:
(New Zealand) Warren Gatland

Man of the Match:
Kieran Read (New Zealand)

Touch judges:
Romain Poite (France)
Jérôme Garcès (France)
Television match official:
George Ayoub (Australia)

- Notes
- On his test debut for the Lions, Peter O'Mahony became the 11th Irishman to captain the team.
- New Zealand's 15-point winning margin marked the heaviest defeat for the Lions since the third test against New Zealand in 2005.
- This defeat was the Lions' third of the tour, the most defeats on a tour since 2005, when they were beaten four times.
- The match marked New Zealand's fifth consecutive victory over the Lions, having last been beaten in the second test in 1993.

==== Second test ====
The second test was notable for the sending off of Sonny Bill Williams, leaving the All Blacks 55 minutes to play with 14 men. At half time, the score remained 9–9, but Beauden Barrett kicked New Zealand into an 18–9 lead before Taulupe Faletau and Conor Murray tries levelled the game at 21–21. On 76 minutes, Charlie Faumuina was penalised for tackling Kyle Sinckler in the air, and Owen Farrell kicked the winning penalty.

1 July 2017
19:35 NZST (UTC+12)

| New Zealand | 21–24 | British & Irish Lions |
| Pen: B. Barrett (7/10) 19', 31', 36', 47', 53', 57', 66' | Report | Try: Faletau 59' m Murray 68' c Con: Farrell (1/2) 69'; Pen: Farrell (4/4) 22', 33', 40', 77' |

Wellington Regional Stadium, Wellington
Attendance: 38,931
Referee: Jérôme Garcès (France)

| FB | 15 | Israel Dagg |
| RW | 14 | Waisake Naholo | | (substituted off) 59' |
| OC | 13 | Anton Lienert-Brown |
| IC | 12 | Sonny Bill Williams | (red card) 24' |
| LW | 11 | Rieko Ioane |
| FH | 10 | Beauden Barrett |
| SH | 9 | Aaron Smith | | (substituted off) 65' |
| N8 | 8 | Kieran Read (c) |
| OF | 7 | Sam Cane | | (substituted off) 63' |
| BF | 6 | Jerome Kaino | | (substituted off) 26' |
| RL | 5 | Sam Whitelock | | (substituted off) 72' |
| LL | 4 | Brodie Retallick |
| TP | 3 | Owen Franks | | (substituted off) 52' |
| HK | 2 | Codie Taylor | | (substituted off) 79' |
| LP | 1 | Joe Moody | | (substituted off) 52' |
Replacements:
| HK | 16 | Nathan Harris | | (substituted on) 79' |
| PR | 17 | Wyatt Crockett | | (substituted on) 52' |
| PR | 18 | Charlie Faumuina | | (substituted on) 52' |
| LK | 19 | Scott Barrett | | (substituted on) 72' |
| FL | 20 | Ardie Savea | | (substituted on) 63' |
| SH | 21 | TJ Perenara | | (substituted on) 65' |
| FH | 22 | Aaron Cruden | | (substituted on) 59' |
| CE | 23 | Ngani Laumape | | (substituted on) 26' |
Coach:
Steve Hansen

| FB | 15 | (Wales) Liam Williams |
| RW | 14 | (England) Anthony Watson | | (substituted off) 24' | (substituted on) 30' |
| OC | 13 | (Wales) Jonathan Davies |
| IC | 12 | (England) Owen Farrell |
| LW | 11 | (England) Elliot Daly |
| FH | 10 | (Ireland) Johnny Sexton |
| SH | 9 | (Ireland) Conor Murray |
| N8 | 8 | (Wales) Taulupe Faletau |
| OF | 7 | (Ireland) Seán O'Brien | | (substituted off) 63' | (substituted on) 65' |
| BF | 6 | (Wales) Sam Warburton (c) |
| RL | 5 | (Wales) Alun Wyn Jones | | (substituted off) 58' |
| LL | 4 | (England) Maro Itoje |
| TP | 3 | (Ireland) Tadhg Furlong | | (substituted off) 61' |
| HK | 2 | (England) Jamie George |
| LP | 1 | (England) Mako Vunipola | (yellow card) 55' to 65' | | (substituted off) 65' |
Replacements:
| HK | 16 | (Wales) Ken Owens |
| PR | 17 | (Ireland) Jack McGrath | | (substituted on) 63' |
| PR | 18 | (England) Kyle Sinckler | | (substituted on) 61' |
| LK | 19 | (England) Courtney Lawes | | (substituted on) 58' |
| FL | 20 | (Ireland) CJ Stander |
| SH | 21 | (Wales) Rhys Webb |
| CE | 22 | (England) Ben Te'o |
| WG | 23 | (England) Jack Nowell | | (substituted on) 24' | (substituted off) 30' |
Coach:
(New Zealand) Warren Gatland

Man of the Match:
Seán O'Brien (British & Irish Lions)

Touch judges:
Jaco Peyper (South Africa)
Romain Poite (France)
Television match official:
George Ayoub (Australia)

- Notes:
- Ngani Laumape (New Zealand) made his international debut.
- Sonny Bill Williams (New Zealand) was only the third New Zealand player to be sent off, and the first since Colin Meads against Scotland in New Zealand's 1967 northern hemisphere tour.
- This was the British & Irish Lions' first win over New Zealand since winning 20–7 during their 1993 tour, and was their first win over New Zealand in the professional era.
- The British & Irish Lions ended New Zealand's 47-match home winning streak, the All Blacks' first loss since their 32–29 defeat to South Africa in 2009.
- This was the first time that New Zealand failed to score any tries in a game since they drew 12–12 with Australia in 2014, and the first time since beating Australia 12–6 in 2002 that they failed to score any tries in a home game.

==== Third test ====
New Zealand led 12–6 at the break, with tries from Laumape and Jordie Barrett, but the Lions fought their way back into the game, and eventually five penalties (four from Owen Farrell and one from Elliot Daly) were enough to draw the game. There was controversy with two minutes left when Ken Owens was initially adjudged to have handled the ball in an offside position after Liam Williams tried to claim a high kick under pressure from Kieran Read; with the scores level, referee Poite initially awarded a penalty in kicking range before overturning it to a scrum after discussion with the video officials.

8 July 2017
19:35 NZST (UTC+12)

| New Zealand | 15–15 | British & Irish Lions |
| Try: Laumape 14' c J. Barrett 35' m Con: B. Barrett (1/2) 15'; Pen: B. Barrett (1/2) 67' | Report | Pen: Farrell (4/4) 20', 32', 59', 77'; Daly (1/1) 41' |

Eden Park, Auckland
Attendance: 48,609
Referee: Romain Poite (France)

| FB | 15 | Jordie Barrett |
| RW | 14 | Israel Dagg |
| OC | 13 | Anton Lienert-Brown |
| IC | 12 | Ngani Laumape | | (substituted off) 66' |
| LW | 11 | Julian Savea | | (substituted off) 72' |
| FH | 10 | Beauden Barrett |
| SH | 9 | Aaron Smith | | (substituted off) 73' |
| N8 | 8 | Kieran Read (c) |
| OF | 7 | Sam Cane | | (substituted off) 59' |
| BF | 6 | Jerome Kaino | (yellow card) 49' to 59' |
| RL | 5 | Sam Whitelock | | (substituted off) 77' |
| LL | 4 | Brodie Retallick |
| TP | 3 | Owen Franks | | (substituted off) 57' |
| HK | 2 | Codie Taylor | | (substituted off) 72' |
| LP | 1 | Joe Moody | | (substituted off) 57' |
Replacements:
| HK | 16 | Nathan Harris | | (substituted on) 72' |
| PR | 17 | Wyatt Crockett | | (substituted on) 57' |
| PR | 18 | Charlie Faumuina | | (substituted on) 57' |
| LK | 19 | Scott Barrett | | (substituted on) 77' |
| FL | 20 | Ardie Savea | | (substituted on) 59' |
| SH | 21 | TJ Perenara | | (substituted on) 73' |
| FH | 22 | Aaron Cruden | | (substituted on) 72' |
| CE | 23 | Malakai Fekitoa | | (substituted on) 66' |
Coach:
Steve Hansen

| FB | 15 | (Wales) Liam Williams |
| RW | 14 | (England) Anthony Watson | (substituted off) 72' |
| OC | 13 | (Wales) Jonathan Davies |
| IC | 12 | (England) Owen Farrell |
| LW | 11 | (England) Elliot Daly |
| FH | 10 | (Ireland) Johnny Sexton | (substituted off) 48' | (substituted on) 52' | (substituted off) 72' |
| SH | 9 | (Ireland) Conor Murray | (substituted off) 69' |
| N8 | 8 | (Wales) Taulupe Faletau |
| OF | 7 | (Ireland) Seán O'Brien | (substituted off) 40' |
| BF | 6 | (Wales) Sam Warburton (c) | | (substituted off) 66' | (substituted on) 72' |
| RL | 5 | (Wales) Alun Wyn Jones | (substituted off) 49' | (substituted on) 66' | (substituted off) 72' |
| LL | 4 | (England) Maro Itoje |
| TP | 3 | (Ireland) Tadhg Furlong | (substituted off) 59' |
| HK | 2 | (England) Jamie George | (substituted off) 69' |
| LP | 1 | (England) Mako Vunipola | (substituted off) 59' |
Replacements:
| HK | 16 | (Wales) Ken Owens | (substituted on) 69' |
| PR | 17 | (Ireland) Jack McGrath | (substituted on) 59' |
| PR | 18 | (England) Kyle Sinckler | (substituted on) 59' |
| LK | 19 | (England) Courtney Lawes | (substituted on) 49' |
| N8 | 20 | (Ireland) CJ Stander | (substituted on) 40' |
| SH | 21 | (Wales) Rhys Webb | (substituted on) 69' |
| CE | 22 | (England) Ben Te'o | (substituted on) 48' | (substituted off) 52' | (substituted on) 72' |
| WG | 23 | (England) Jack Nowell | (substituted on) 72' |
Coach:
(New Zealand) Warren Gatland

Touch judges:
Jérôme Garcès (France)
Jaco Peyper (South Africa)
Television match official:
George Ayoub (Australia)

Notes:

- Kieran Read (New Zealand) became the seventh All Black to reach 100 test caps.
- Aaron Cruden and Charlie Faumuina (both New Zealand) earned their 50th test caps.
- This was the first time the Lions and New Zealand had drawn a test match since their 14–14 draw in 1971, and the first time the Lions had drawn any test match since their 13–13 draw with South Africa in 1974.
- This was the first British & Irish Lions series drawn with New Zealand, and the first against any side since the 2–2 draw with South Africa in 1955.
- This was the first time since New Zealand drew with South Africa 18–18 in 1994 that they have failed to win a game at Eden Park.

== Attendances ==
Attendances
| Matches | 10 |
| Total Attendance | 343,269 |
| Average Attendance | 34,327 |
| Highest Attendance | 48,609; New Zealand vs British & Irish Lions; Eden Park 8 July 2017 |
| Lowest Attendance | 19,951; New Zealand Barbarians vs British & Irish Lions; Okara Park 3 June 2017 |

== Statistics ==
=== Lions player statistics ===
Key

- Con: Conversions
- Pen: Penalties
- DG: Drop goals
- Pts: Points

| Name | Non-Test | | | | | | Test | | | | | | Overall | | | | | | Cards |
| Name | Played | Tries | Con | Pen | DG | Pts | Played | Tries | Con | Pen | DG | Pts | Played | Tries | Con | Pen | DG | Pts | Cards |
|---|---|---|---|---|---|---|---|---|---|---|---|---|---|---|---|---|---|---|---|
| Owen Farrell | 3 | 0 | 1 | 4 | 0 | 14 | 3 | 0 | 2 | 9 | 0 | 31 | 6 | 0 | 3 | 13 | 0 | 45 | – |
| Dan Biggar | 5 | 0 | 7 | 7 | 0 | 35 | – | – | – | – | – | – | 5 | 0 | 7 | 7 | 0 | 35 | – |
| Leigh Halfpenny | 3 | 0 | 2 | 9 | 0 | 31 | 1 | 0 | 0 | 0 | 0 | 0 | 4 | 0 | 2 | 9 | 0 | 31 | – |
| Tommy Seymour | 4 | 3 | 0 | 0 | 0 | 15 | – | – | – | – | – | – | 4 | 3 | 0 | 0 | 0 | 15 | – |
| Jack Nowell | 4 | 2 | 0 | 0 | 0 | 10 | 2 | 0 | 0 | 0 | 0 | 0 | 6 | 2 | 0 | 0 | 0 | 10 | – |
| Taulupe Faletau | 3 | 0 | 0 | 0 | 0 | 0 | 3 | 1 | 0 | 0 | 0 | 5 | 6 | 1 | 0 | 0 | 0 | 5 | – |
| Maro Itoje | 3 | 1 | 0 | 0 | 0 | 5 | 3 | 0 | 0 | 0 | 0 | 0 | 6 | 1 | 0 | 0 | 0 | 5 | – |
| CJ Stander | 5 | 1 | 0 | 0 | 0 | 5 | 1 | 0 | 0 | 0 | 0 | 0 | 6 | 1 | 0 | 0 | 0 | 5 | – |
| Sam Warburton | 3 | 1 | 0 | 0 | 0 | 5 | 3 | 0 | 0 | 0 | 0 | 0 | 6 | 1 | 0 | 0 | 0 | 5 | – |
| Anthony Watson | 3 | 1 | 0 | 0 | 0 | 5 | 3 | 0 | 0 | 0 | 0 | 0 | 6 | 1 | 0 | 0 | 0 | 5 | – |
| Conor Murray | 2 | 0 | 0 | 0 | 0 | 0 | 3 | 1 | 0 | 0 | 0 | 5 | 5 | 1 | 0 | 0 | 0 | 5 | – |
| Seán O'Brien | 2 | 0 | 0 | 0 | 0 | 0 | 3 | 1 | 0 | 0 | 0 | 5 | 5 | 1 | 0 | 0 | 0 | 5 | – |
| Rhys Webb | 3 | 0 | 0 | 0 | 0 | 0 | 2 | 1 | 0 | 0 | 0 | 5 | 5 | 1 | 0 | 0 | 0 | 5 | – |
| Jonathan Joseph | 3 | 1 | 0 | 0 | 0 | 5 | – | – | – | – | – | – | 3 | 1 | 0 | 0 | 0 | 5 | – |
| George North | 3 | 1 | 0 | 0 | 0 | 5 | – | – | – | – | – | – | 3 | 1 | 0 | 0 | 0 | 5 | – |
| Jared Payne | 3 | 1 | 0 | 0 | 0 | 5 | – | – | – | – | – | – | 3 | 1 | 0 | 0 | 0 | 5 | – |
| Elliot Daly | 4 | 0 | 0 | 0 | 0 | 0 | 3 | 0 | 0 | 1 | 0 | 3 | 7 | 0 | 0 | 1 | 0 | 3 | – |
| Johnny Sexton | 4 | 0 | 0 | 1 | 0 | 3 | 3 | 0 | 0 | 0 | 0 | 0 | 7 | 0 | 0 | 1 | 0 | 3 | – |
| Greig Laidlaw | 6 | 0 | 0 | 1 | 0 | 3 | – | – | – | – | – | – | 6 | 0 | 0 | 1 | 0 | 3 | – |
| Alun Wyn Jones | 4 | 0 | 0 | 0 | 0 | 0 | 3 | 0 | 0 | 0 | 0 | 0 | 7 | 0 | 0 | 0 | 0 | 0 | – |
| Jack McGrath | 4 | 0 | 0 | 0 | 0 | 0 | 3 | 0 | 0 | 0 | 0 | 0 | 7 | 0 | 0 | 0 | 0 | 0 | – |
| Kyle Sinckler | 4 | 0 | 0 | 0 | 0 | 0 | 3 | 0 | 0 | 0 | 0 | 0 | 7 | 0 | 0 | 0 | 0 | 0 | – |
| Tadhg Furlong | 3 | 0 | 0 | 0 | 0 | 0 | 3 | 0 | 0 | 0 | 0 | 0 | 6 | 0 | 0 | 0 | 0 | 0 | – |
| Jamie George | 3 | 0 | 0 | 0 | 0 | 0 | 3 | 0 | 0 | 0 | 0 | 0 | 6 | 0 | 0 | 0 | 0 | 0 | – |
| Iain Henderson | 6 | 0 | 0 | 0 | 0 | 0 | – | – | – | – | – | – | 6 | 0 | 0 | 0 | 0 | 0 | 1 (yellow card) |
| Courtney Lawes | 4 | 0 | 0 | 0 | 0 | 0 | 2 | 0 | 0 | 0 | 0 | 0 | 6 | 0 | 0 | 0 | 0 | 0 | – |
| Ken Owens | 4 | 0 | 0 | 0 | 0 | 0 | 2 | 0 | 0 | 0 | 0 | 0 | 6 | 0 | 0 | 0 | 0 | 0 | – |
| Mako Vunipola | 3 | 0 | 0 | 0 | 0 | 0 | 3 | 0 | 0 | 0 | 0 | 0 | 6 | 0 | 0 | 0 | 0 | 0 | 1 (yellow card) |
| Liam Williams | 3 | 0 | 0 | 0 | 0 | 0 | 3 | 0 | 0 | 0 | 0 | 0 | 6 | 0 | 0 | 0 | 0 | 0 | 1 (yellow card) |
| Rory Best | 5 | 0 | 0 | 0 | 0 | 0 | – | – | – | – | – | – | 5 | 0 | 0 | 0 | 0 | 0 | – |
| Dan Cole | 5 | 0 | 0 | 0 | 0 | 0 | – | – | – | – | – | – | 5 | 0 | 0 | 0 | 0 | 0 | – |
| Jonathan Davies | 2 | 0 | 0 | 0 | 0 | 0 | 3 | 0 | 0 | 0 | 0 | 0 | 5 | 0 | 0 | 0 | 0 | 0 | – |
| George Kruis | 4 | 0 | 0 | 0 | 0 | 0 | 1 | 0 | 0 | 0 | 0 | 0 | 5 | 0 | 0 | 0 | 0 | 0 | – |
| Joe Marler | 5 | 0 | 0 | 0 | 0 | 0 | – | – | – | – | – | – | 5 | 0 | 0 | 0 | 0 | 0 | 1 (yellow card) |
| Justin Tipuric | 5 | 0 | 0 | 0 | 0 | 0 | – | – | – | – | – | – | 5 | 0 | 0 | 0 | 0 | 0 | – |
| Ben Te'o | 3 | 0 | 0 | 0 | 0 | 0 | 2 | 0 | 0 | 0 | 0 | 0 | 5 | 0 | 0 | 0 | 0 | 0 | – |
| James Haskell | 4 | 0 | 0 | 0 | 0 | 0 | – | – | – | – | – | – | 4 | 0 | 0 | 0 | 0 | 0 | – |
| Robbie Henshaw | 4 | 0 | 0 | 0 | 0 | 0 | – | – | – | – | – | – | 4 | 0 | 0 | 0 | 0 | 0 | – |
| Peter O'Mahony | 3 | 0 | 0 | 0 | 0 | 0 | 1 | 0 | 0 | 0 | 0 | 0 | 4 | 0 | 0 | 0 | 0 | 0 | – |
| Stuart Hogg | 2 | 0 | 0 | 0 | 0 | 0 | – | – | – | – | – | – | 2 | 0 | 0 | 0 | 0 | 0 | – |
| Ross Moriarty | 1 | 0 | 0 | 0 | 0 | 0 | – | – | – | – | – | – | 1 | 0 | 0 | 0 | 0 | 0 | – |
| Finn Russell | 1 | 0 | 0 | 0 | 0 | 0 | – | – | – | – | – | – | 1 | 0 | 0 | 0 | 0 | 0 | – |
| Allan Dell | 1 | 0 | 0 | 0 | 0 | 0 | – | – | – | – | – | – | 1 | 0 | 0 | 0 | 0 | 0 | – |
| Kristian Dacey | Did not play | | | | | | | | | | | | | | | | | | |
| Gareth Davies | Did not play | | | | | | | | | | | | | | | | | | |
| Tomas Francis | Did not play | | | | | | | | | | | | | | | | | | |
| Cory Hill | Did not play | | | | | | | | | | | | | | | | | | |
| Billy Vunipola | Did not play – Withdrawn due to injury ahead of tour | | | | | | | | | | | | | | | | | | |
| Ben Youngs | Did not play – Withdrawn for personal reasons ahead of tour | | | | | | | | | | | | | | | | | | |

=== Test match statistics ===
Key

- Con: Conversions
- Pen: Penalties
- DG: Drop goals
- Pts: Points

| Name | Team | Tries | Con | Pen | DG | Pts |
|---|---|---|---|---|---|---|
| Beauden Barrett | New Zealand | – | 4 | 11 | – | 41 |
| Owen Farrell | British & Irish Lions | – | 2 | 9 | – | 31 |
| Rieko Ioane | New Zealand | 2 | – | – | – | 10 |
| Jordie Barrett | New Zealand | 1 | – | – | – | 5 |
| Taulupe Faletau | British & Irish Lions | 1 | – | – | – | 5 |
| Ngani Laumape | New Zealand | 1 | – | – | – | 5 |
| Conor Murray | British & Irish Lions | 1 | – | – | – | 5 |
| Seán O'Brien | British & Irish Lions | 1 | – | – | – | 5 |
| Codie Taylor | New Zealand | 1 | – | – | – | 5 |
| Rhys Webb | British & Irish Lions | 1 | – | – | – | 5 |
| Elliot Daly | British & Irish Lions | – | – | 1 | – | 3 |

== Broadcasting ==
Sky Sport was the host broadcaster. Sky Sports televised the tour in the UK and Ireland and S4C showed highlights throughout the UK in the Welsh language. In addition to Sky Sports, Talksport provided exclusive live UK radio commentary.

Other broadcasters included Fox Sports in Australia, SuperSport in South Africa, Sky Sport in Italy, Eir Sport in Asia and ESPN in the USA.

== Sponsors ==
Land Rover and Ernst & Young (EY) were principal partners of the Lions while Standard Life was the main sponsor for the Lions, sponsoring their shirts on tour.
