= Phil Pask =

English physiotherapist and rugby union footballer

Phil Pask is a British physiotherapist and former rugby union player.

Pask played rugby union for Northampton Saints, making 150 appearances for the team. He became the Saints' fitness trainer and then physiotherapist. In this role, he contributed to their win in the 2000 Heineken Cup Final.

Pask was the England national rugby union team's senior physiotherapist from 1997. He worked with the side during the 1999, 2003, 2007, 2011, 2015 and 2019 Rugby World Cups, as well as the 2003 and 2016 Six Nations Championships (in which they won the Grand Slam).

Phil Pask was the physiotherapist for the British & Irish Lions rugby union squad. He was senior physiotherapist on the 2005 and 2017 tours to New Zealand, the 2009 tour to South Africa, and the victorious 2013 tour to Australia.

Pask studied Sport and Exercise Science at Birmingham University, graduating in 1981. In 1999 he achieved a MSc in Sports Medicine and Rehabilitation from Manchester Metropolitan University and in 2015 became an Honorary Doctor of Science, University of Bedfordshire.
