= Ben Te'o =

GB & England (RU) & Samoa (RL) international rugby footballer

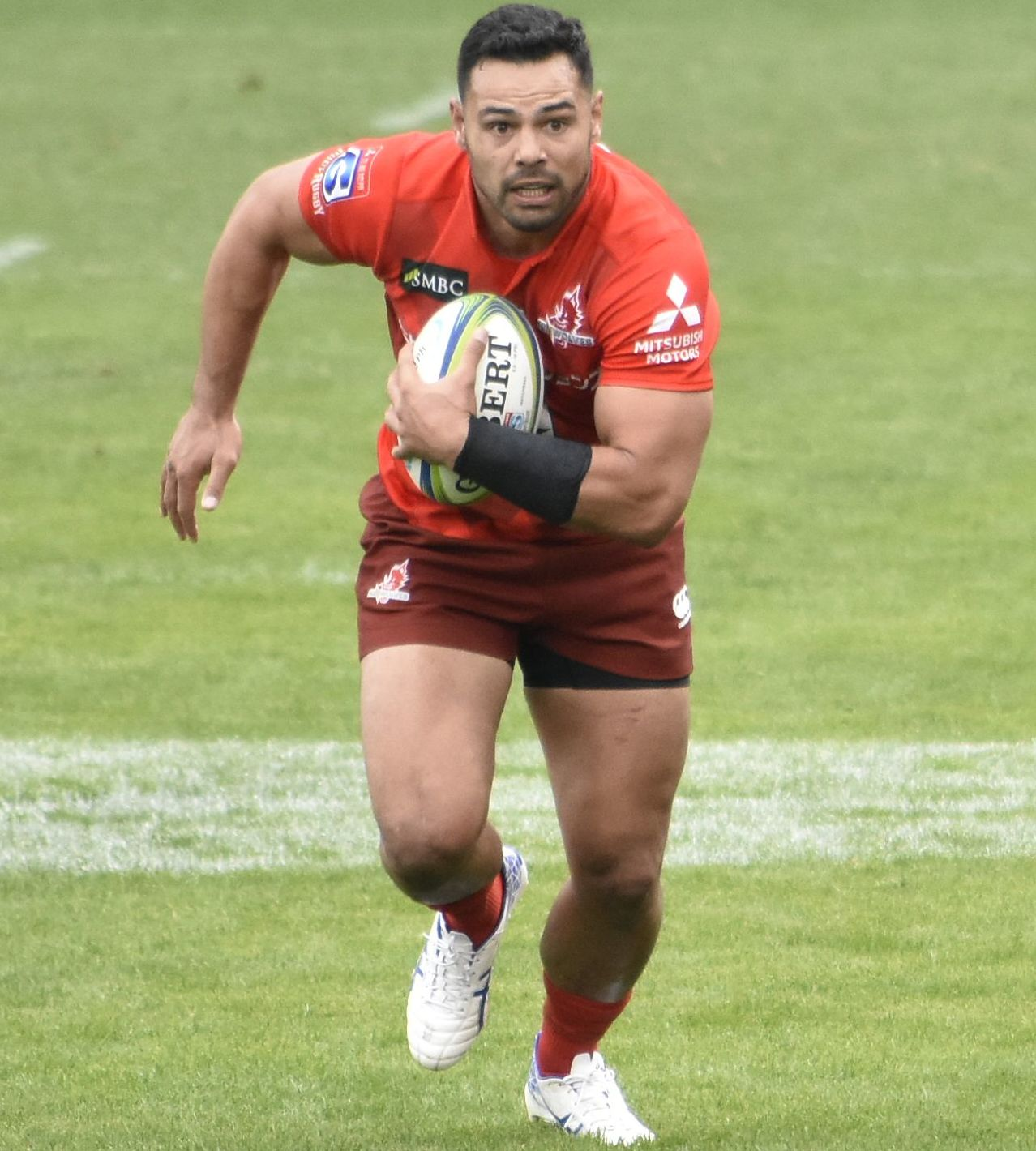

Personal information
- Full name: Benjamin Te'o
- Born: 27 January 1987 (age 39) Auckland, New Zealand
- Height: 189 cm (6 ft 2 in)
- Weight: 109 kg (17 st 2 lb)

Playing information

Rugby league
- Position: Second-row
Club
Years	Team	Pld	T	G	FG	P
2007–08	Wests Tigers	36	10	0	0	40
2009–12	Brisbane Broncos	75	28	0	0	112
2013–14	South Sydney	42	4	0	0	20
2020–21	Brisbane Broncos	21	1	0	0	4
	Total	174	43	0	0	176
Representative
Years	Team	Pld	T	G	FG	P
2008	Samoa	1	2	0	0	8
2012	Prime Minister's XIII	1	0	0	0	0
2012–14	Queensland	7	0	0	0	0

Rugby union
- Position: Centre
Club
Years	Team	Pld	T	G	FG	P
2014–16	Leinster	51	6	0	0	30
2016–19	Worcester Warriors	36	8	0	0	40
2019	Toulon	6	0	0	0	0
2020	Sunwolves	5	0	0	0	0
	Total	98	14	0	0	70
Representative
Years	Team	Pld	T	G	FG	P
2016–19	England	18	2	0	0	10
2017	British & Irish Lions	2	0	0	0	0
- Source: As of 9 April 2021

Ben Te'o (born 27 January 1987) is a rugby league coach, and former professional rugby union and rugby league footballer. He is a former assistant coach for the Brisbane Broncos. Born in New Zealand to Samoan and English parents, he represented Samoa in rugby league and England in rugby union.

He last played as a second-rower for the Brisbane Broncos in the NRL, and he previously played for the Wests Tigers and the South Sydney Rabbitohs with whom he won the 2014 NRL Grand Final. Te'o also played at representative level for Queensland in the State of Origin series and won one international cap for Samoa.

Between 2014 and 2020 he played professional rugby union as a centre for Leinster in Ireland, Worcester in England and Toulon in France. He played at international level, winning 18 caps for England and 2 for the British & Irish Lions.

== Background ==
Te'o was born in Auckland, New Zealand. His father is Samoan and his mother is English.

He was a Hibiscus Coast Raiders junior, and was selected to play for the New Zealand Under 16s in 2003 and was also a member of the 2005 Junior Kiwis. He also played rugby union as a junior. Te'o moved to Australia at the age of 17 and lived on the Gold Coast in Queensland, playing rugby league with Keebra Park State High School.

== Rugby league career ==
=== Wests Tigers ===
In the 2007 NRL season Te'o debuted for the Wests Tigers in Round 9 against the St George Illawarra Dragons, and scored his first try in first grade the next week against the New Zealand Warriors. Te'o played 14 games and scored 2 tries in the 2007 season. In September 2007, he was called into the New Zealand national rugby league team train-on squad with several other Wests Tigers players but was not selected for the tour of Great Britain. Te'o played 22 games and scored 8 tries in the 2008 NRL season.

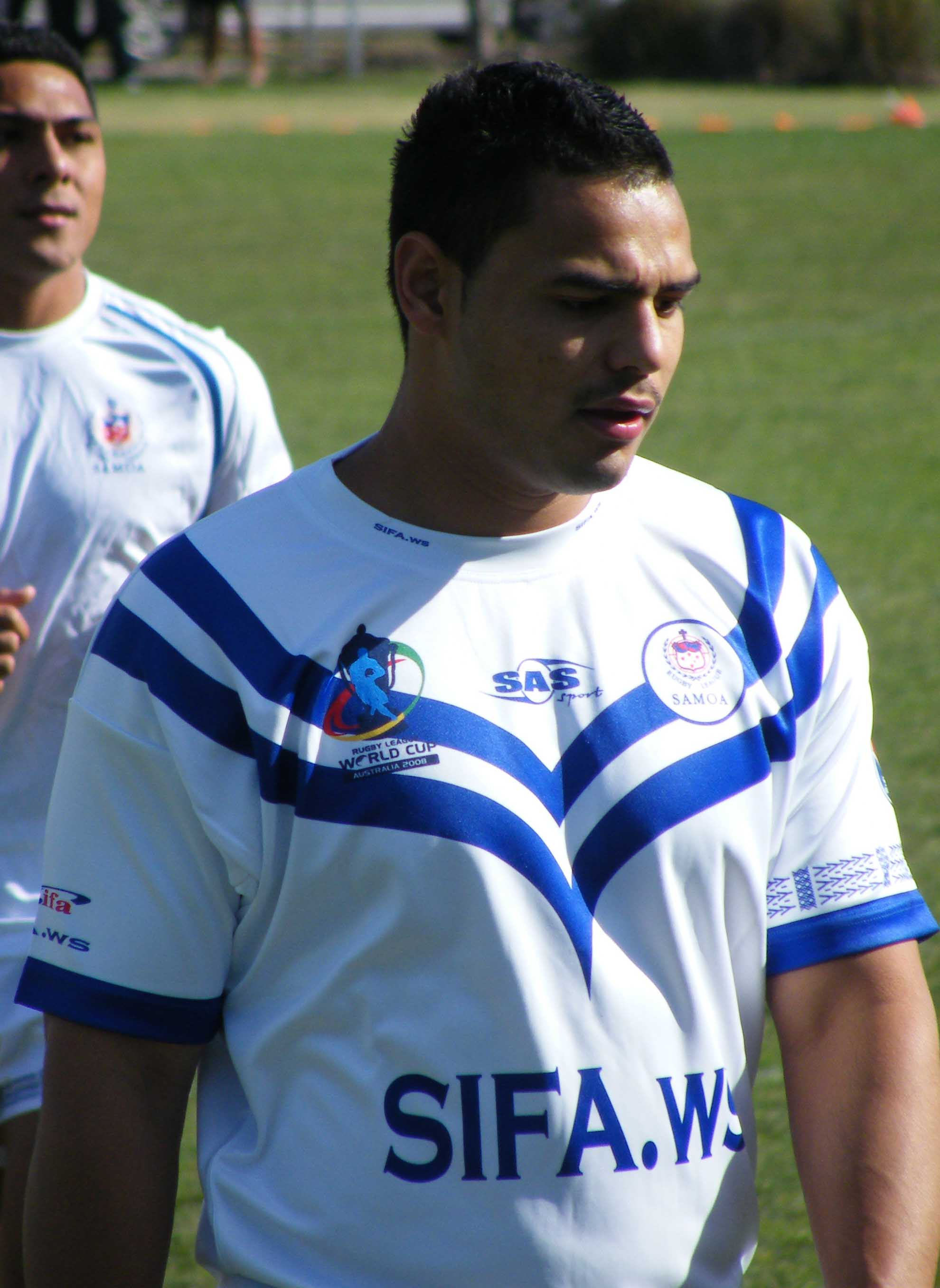
Te'o warming up for Samoa at the 2008 Rugby League World Cup

He was named in the Samoa squad for the 2008 Rugby League World Cup. He was overlooked for the first two Samoa matches, but made his international debut on 9 November at CUA Stadium against France, scoring two tries.

=== Brisbane Broncos ===
Te'o signed with the Brisbane Broncos for the 2009 season. He made his debut for the Broncos at second row in Round 1 against the North Queensland Cowboys

Te'o played 18 games and scored 4 tries in his first year for the Broncos in 2009.

In May 2010, he was named in the Queensland Maroons squad to play against the Blues. Te'o pledged his allegiance to the Australia and the Maroons being named as the 18th man for Game 1.

It was announced on 5 June 2010, that Te'o had signed a contract extension which would see him remain at the Broncos until the end of the 2012 season.

On 2 May 2012, it was announced Te'o had agreed to terms with the South Sydney Rabbitohs up until the end of the 2015 NRL season. Later that year, he was selected to make Origin debut for the Maroons in game 3.

=== South Sydney Rabbitohs ===
Te’o joined the Rabbitohs in 2013. Te’o represented Queensland and was selected in the Australian squad in 2012. Keen to establish himself as a starting forward in the Rabbitohs pack in 2013.

Te'o played all three games of the 2013 State of Origin series from the interchange bench, helping Queensland extend their record for consecutive series victories to eight. In the 2014 pre-season Te'o played for the Rabbitohs in the 2014 NRL Auckland Nines tournament. He played from the interchange bench in all three games of the 2014 State of Origin series, which Queensland lost.

Te'o scored a crucial try against the Sydney Roosters in the semi-final of the 2014 NRL finals series, upon returning from suspension for a chicken wing tackle on Sam Thaiday.

On 4 June 2014, Te'o announced that he would be leaving the Rabbitohs at the end of the season.

Te'o played in the Rabbitohs premiership winning side in the 2014 NRL Grand Final.

=== Return to Brisbane Broncos 2020 and retirement in 2021 ===
On 4 June 2020, Te'o returned to the Brisbane Broncos, signing with the club for the rest of the 2020 season. He has been re-signed for 2021 as part of the Broncos' 30-man squad. On 19 August 2021, Te'o announced that he was retiring at the end of the season. He played his last game against the South Sydney Rabbitohs in round 5 of the 2021 season. He retired immediately once the season was over.

== Post NRL ==
On 7 March 2024, Te'o was named as the Under 19s coach for the Queensland Maroons. In November 2024, Te'o had joined the coaching staff of the Brisbane Broncos.

On 24 March 2026, Te'o resigned as Brisbane assistant coach with immediate effect. It was alleged that Te'o had fallen out with head coach Michael Maguire.

On 18 November 2026, the Rabbitohs announced that Te'o had returned to the club in an assistant coaching role until the end of 2029.

== Rugby union career ==
=== Leinster ===
On 12 August 2014, Leinster announced Te'o had signed to play for them after the end of the 2014 NRL season. Te'o broke his arm within the first twenty minutes of his Leinster professional debut. After only three weeks he was named in the starting squad for Leinster after coach Matt O'Connor described him as an outstanding athlete.

=== Worcester Warriors ===
On 22 December 2015, Te'o signed with English club Worcester Warriors in the Aviva Premiership from the 2016–17 season.

=== Toulon ===
On 21 August 2019, Te'o signed with French side RC Toulonnais. Providing cover for the club due to players being involved in the 2019 World Cup, Te'o left the club on Christmas Eve 2019.

=== Sunwolves ===
In 2020, Te'o signed with Japanese Super Rugby club the Sunwolves. He left the club after the cancellation of the 2020 Super Rugby season.

=== International ===
In May 2016 Te'o was called up by England coach Eddie Jones for the tour of Australia. He scored his first England try after coming on as a replacement against France on 4 February 2017. He made his international starting debut on 26 February 2017, against Italy during the Six Nations.

Te'o played in the 2017 Lions tour to New Zealand. He started the first test at inside centre.

Te'o returned from injury to start his second test for England against Italy in the opening round of the Six Nations and went on to feature in all of England's 2018 Six Nations matches.

He was cut from the England squad before the 2019 Rugby World Cup after a fight with his team-mate Mike Brown.

=== International tries ===
As of 7 July 2019

Try	Opposing team	Location	Venue	Competition	Date	Result	Score
1	France	London, England	Twickenham Stadium	2017 Six Nations	4 February 2017	Win	19 – 16
2	Italy	London, England	Twickenham Stadium	2017 Six Nations	26 February 2017	Win	36 – 15

== Controversy ==
In 2013, Te'o was cleared of assault after an altercation at a home in Brisbane. He claimed a woman attacked him with a stiletto and he acted in self-defence. The woman was left unconscious.
