= Ngani Laumape =

NZ international rugby union & league player

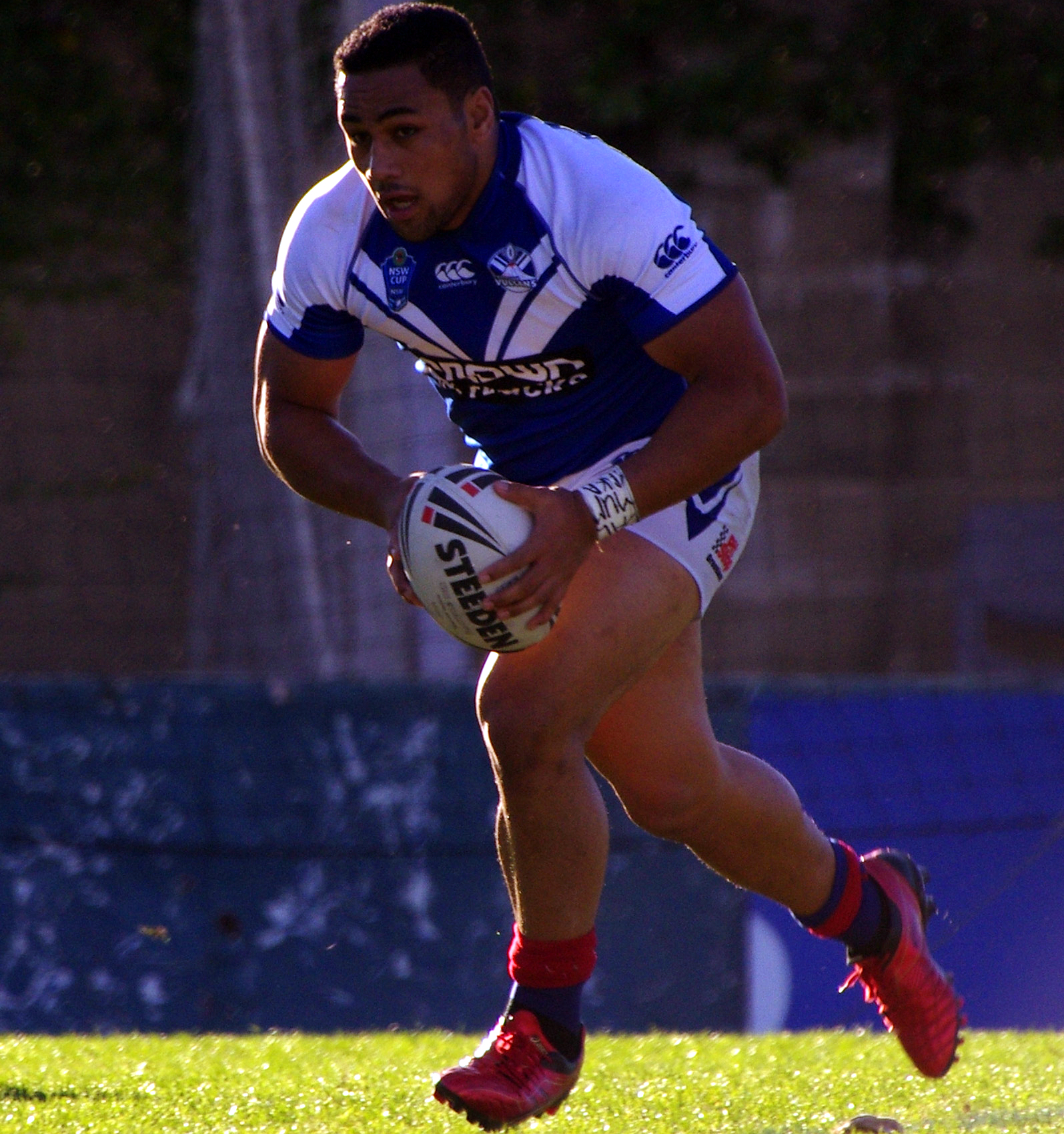
- Full name: Koinonia Halafungani Laumape
- Born: 22 April 1993 (age 33) Palmerston North, New Zealand
- Height: 171 cm (5 ft 7 in)
- Weight: 104 kg (229 lb; 16 st 5 lb)
- School: Palmerston North Boys' High School

Rugby union career
- Position: Centre
- Current team: Manawatu
Youth career
- Palmerston North Boys' High School
Senior career
Years	Team	Apps	(Points)
2016–2021	Hurricanes	85	(245)
2016–2019 2025–	Manawatu	19	(70)
2021–2022	Stade Français	22	(10)
2022–2025	Kobelco Kobe Steelers	28	(44)
2025–2026	Moana Pasifika	4	(0)
- Correct as of 29 April 2026
International career
Years	Team	Apps	(Points)
2017–2020	New Zealand	15	(40)
2025	ANZAC XV	1	(0)
- Correct as of 06 November 2024
- Rugby league career

Playing information
- Position: Wing, Centre
Club
Years	Team	Pld	T	G	FG	P
2013–15	New Zealand Warriors	30	11			44
Representative
Years	Team	Pld	T	G	FG	P
2013	Junior Kiwis	1				0

Koinonia Halafungani Laumape (born 22 April 1993) is a New Zealand rugby union footballer who currently plays as a centre for Kobelco Kobe Steelers. Laumape previously played in Super Rugby for the Hurricanes and was previously a rugby league player for the New Zealand Warriors in the National Rugby League.

== Early life ==
Laumape is of Tongan descent. Laumape originally played rugby union, touring Britain and Thailand with the Palmerston North Boys' High School 1st XV and playing for New Zealand Schools. Laumape then switched to rugby league, signing with the New Zealand Warriors, and playing in the 2012 NYC. He was the club's top try-scorer in the junior competition with 16 tries.

== Club career ==
=== Rugby League ===
In Round 3 of the 2013 NRL season, Laumape made his first grade debut for the New Zealand Warriors on the wing against the Cronulla-Sutherland Sharks in the Warriors 28–4 loss at Remondis Stadium. In his third match in Round 5 against the South Sydney Rabbitohs, Laumape scored his first NRL career try in the Warriors' 24-22 loss at Mt Smart Stadium. Laumape finished his debut year in the NRL with him playing in 14 matches and scoring 6 tries for the Warriors.

In February 2014, Laumape was selected for the Warriors inaugural Auckland Nines squad. Laumape finished off the Warriors 2014 NRL season with him playing in 16 matches and scoring 5 tries. On 9 September, Laumape was selected for the New Zealand national rugby league team 2014 Four Nations train on squad, but did not make the final 24-man squad.

=== Hurricanes ===
On 16 January 2015, Laumape was named in the Warriors' 2015 Auckland Nines squad. After suffering a season ending leg injury, Laumape returned to rugby union, signing with the Manawatu Turbos and Hurricanes in July 2015.

Laumape made his debut for the Hurricanes in the 2016 Super Rugby competition, starting in the inside centre position against the Brumbies whilst scoring his first professional rugby union try. He then celebrated his return to Palmerston North with scoring his second try of the season in the Hurricanes win over the Force. After playing majority of the season as the favoured centre, he found himself on the bench later throughout the year but gained praise for his solid defence and strong ball-carrying runs, causing plenty of issues for his opponents. Overall Laumpape gained 11 appearances for the franchise and scored 4 tries, as well as winning the side's first ever Super Rugby title after their 20–3 victory over the Lions in the 2016 grand final.

After a formidable Super Rugby campaign, Laumape returned home to play for Manawatu in the 2016 Mitre 10 Cup. He scored a hat-trick in his first game against fellow provincial side, Southland to lead the competition in try-scoring. He ended the season as one of just three Manawatu players to list in the competition statistical leaders of any of the major categories. Laumape finished third-equal in tries with seven. He was leading the category at the halfway-point with six. He was also the team's best attacking weapon leading the side in carries and defenders beaten, while he was second in clean breaks and metres gained.

Laumape started 2017 strongly, and after the opening month he led the competition for line breaks and defenders beaten as well as scoring five tries in the Hurricanes opening four matches. Laumape became a regular starter for the Hurricanes during the 2017 Super Rugby season, finishing the competition as the highest individual try-scorer. Laumape scored his 15th try for 2017 in the semi-final against the Johannesburg-based Lions. The Hurricanes failed to beat the Lions in the semi-final however, losing 29–44.

On 27 June 2017, Laumape started for the Hurricanes against the touring British & Irish Lions, at home at Westpac Stadium. Laumape scored a try just before half-time, and played the full 80 minutes of the historic fixture, which was a 31–31 draw.

=== Stade Français ===
Laumape left the Hurricanes to join Stade Français on a three-year deal following the conclusion of the 2021 Super Rugby Trans-Tasman season. However, he was released ahead of the 2022–23 season.

=== Kobe Steelers ===
Following his release by Stade Français, Laumape signed for Kobelco Kobe Steelers.

=== Moana Pasifika ===
On 10 June 2025, it was announced that Laumape would join Moana Pasifika for the 2026 and 2027 Super Rugby seasons.

== International career ==
=== 2013–14 ===
In 2013, Laumpape was named in the Junior Kiwis side to play the Junior Kangaroos in Sydney, after coach Brent Gemmell named a side based on experience. The squad featured nine players from the Junior Warriors that were involved in the Holden Cup Grand Final, including Laumape. He started at centre, being the side's only recognised NRL player in their 38–26 defeat. He also narrowly missed out on making the New Zealand Kiwis test side in 2014 after being named in the training squad earlier that year.

=== 2017–18 ===
Laumape was introduced into the All Blacks squad for the 2017 Pasifika Challenge against Samoa and the three-test series against the touring British & Irish Lions. Laumape's inclusion in the squad pushed out Malakai Fekitoa who had already played 23 tests. He was one of three debutants named in the side along with fellow Hurricanes teammates Jordie Barrett and Vaea Fifita, both of whom debuted against Samoa. He was brought into the match-day 23 for the second test against the Lions following Ryan Crotty's hamstring injury in the first test. Laumape was bought on early in the first half of the test for 80-test veteran Jerome Kaino, as the coaches wanted to bring off a forward in order to complete their backline after Sonny Bill Williams received a red card for a shoulder charge. Following the 24–21 loss on his debut, Laumape started in the third test of the Lions series and scored a try- the first of his international career which set up by Jordie Barrett. Laumape was replaced in the 66th minute of the third test by the re-called Fekitoa, with the third test ending in an historic 15–15 draw.

Laumape was kept in the All Blacks squad for the 2017 Rugby Championship and replaced Sonny Bill Williams off the bench in both tests against Argentina. Following the Rugby Championship, Laumape was one of over 40 All Blacks named in the end-of-season tour and made two appearances on the tour. Laumape made his second start in the black jersey against the Barbarians on 5 November 2017, contributing a try to the 31–22 win and was not subbed off in the game. Laumape started again 10 days later against a French XV that day, scoring what turned out to be the winning try of the 28–23 result in the 55th minute.

== Statistics ==
=== Club ===
Year	Club	Competition	GP	GS	TRY	CON	PEN	DGL	GK%	PTS	Yellow card	Red card
2013	Warriors	National Rugby League	14	8	6	0	0	0	0	24	0	0
2014	Warriors	National Rugby League	16	16	5	0	0	0	0	20	0	0
2015	Warriors	National Rugby League	0	0	0	0	0	0	0	0	0	0
2016†	Hurricanes	Super Rugby	11	7	4	0	0	0	0	20	0	0
2017†	Hurricanes	Super Rugby	16	16	15	0	0	0	0	75	2	0
2017†	Hurricanes	British & Irish Lions	1	1	1	0	0	0	0	5	0	0
2016	Manawatu	Mitre 10 Cup	10	10	7	0	0	0	0	35	0	0
Career			51	41	22	0	0	0	0	99	0	0

=== International ===
Opposition	GP	GS	TRY	CON	PEN	DGL	GK%	PTS	Yellow card	Red card	W	D	L	W-L%
Junior Kangaroos	1	1	0	0	0	0	0	0	0	0	0	0	1	.00
Argentina	2	0	0	0	0	0	0	0	0	0	2	0	0	100.00
Barbarians	1	1	1	0	0	0	0	5	0	0	1	0	0	100.00
British & Irish Lions	2	1	1	0	0	0	0	5	0	0	0	1	1	.00
Career	6	3	2	0	0	0	0	10	0	0	3	1	2	0

=== International tries ===
Tries	Opposition	Location	Venue	Competition	Date	Result
1	British & Irish Lions	Auckland	Eden Park	Lions tour	8 July 2017	Drew
2	Barbarians	London	Twickenham Stadium	End-of-year tour	4 November 2017	Won
