= Tommy Seymour =

Scottish rugby union player (born 1988)

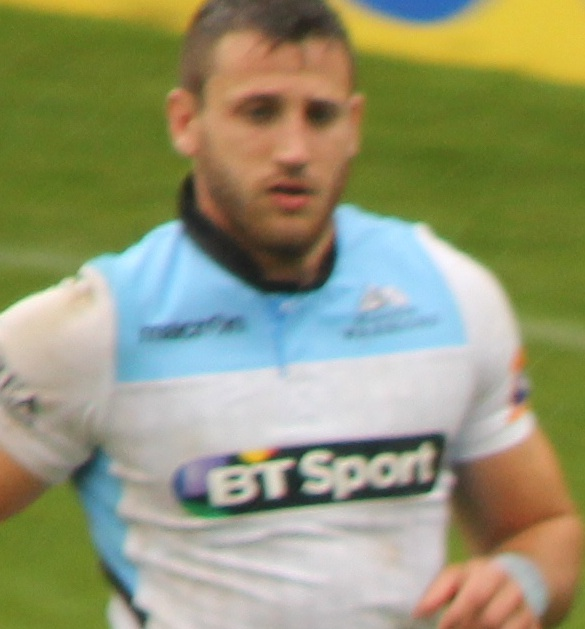
- Seymour in 2013
- Born: Thomas Samuel Fenwick Seymour; 1 July 1988 (age 38) Nashville, Tennessee, United States
- Height: 1.83 m (6 ft 0 in)
- Weight: 95 kg (14 st 13 lb; 209 lb)
- School: Down High School

Rugby union career
- Position(s): Wing, Fullback
Amateur team(s)
Years	Team	Apps	(Points)
2017–18	Marr		
2018–	Currie		
Senior career
Years	Team	Apps	(Points)
2010–2011	Ulster	7	(5)
2011–2021	Glasgow	120	(190)
- Correct as of 11 November 2018
International career
Years	Team	Apps	(Points)
2007	Ireland U19		
2013–2019	Scotland	55	(100)
2017	British & Irish Lions		
- Correct as of 13 October 2019

Thomas Samuel Fenwick Seymour (born 1 July 1988) is a Scottish former professional rugby union player. He made 55 international appearances for the Scotland national rugby union team 2013–2019, scoring 20 tries which placed him fourth-top try scorer for the country. He played in two world cups and the 2017 British & Irish Lions tour to New Zealand. His regular playing position was wing.

== Early life ==
Seymour was born in Nashville to a Scottish mother and English father. He spent his first nine years in the United States before his father's job took the family overseas, first to Dubai for eighteen months and later to Tyrella, Northern Ireland. He attended Down High School. Tyrella remains home to Seymour's parents.

== Club career ==
Seymour was drafted to Marr RFC in the Scottish Premiership for the 2017-18 season. He was drafted to Currie in the Scottish Premiership for the 2018-19 season.

Seymour played for Glasgow Warriors in the Pro14, having previously represented Ulster. He was named in the Pro12 Dream Teams at the end of the 2014/15 and 2016/17 seasons. In April 2021, he announced his retirement from all professional rugby.

== International career ==
Qualifying to play internationally for Scotland through his Glasgow-born mother, on 24 October 2012 he was named in the full Scottish national team for the 2012 end-of-year rugby union tests. In November 2014 he scored two tries from interceptions against Argentina and New Zealand and followed it up with a try against Tonga.

In April 2017 Seymour was named as one of two Scottish players selected for the initial British & Irish Lions squad to tour New Zealand in June and July. While not featuring in any of the test matches, he appeared in four games on tour, scoring one try against the Highlanders and two tries against the Hurricanes. His three tries meant he was the leading try scorer on tour.

In December 2019 Seymour announced his retirement from playing international rugby.

=== International tries ===
As of 21 November 2021.

Try	Opposing Team	Venue	Competition	Date	Result	Score
1	Japan	Murrayfield Stadium, Edinburgh	2013 Autumn Internationals	9 November 2013	Win	42-17
2	Japan	Murrayfield Stadium, Edinburgh	2013 Autumn Internationals	9 November 2013	Win	42-17
3	France	Murrayfield Stadium, Edinburgh	2014 Six Nations	8 March 2014	Loss	17-19
4	Argentina	Murrayfield Stadium, Edinburgh	2014 Autumn Internationals	8 November 2014	Win	41-31
5	New Zealand	Murrayfield Stadium, Edinburgh	2014 Autumn Internationals	15 November 2014	Loss	16-24
6	Tonga	Rugby Park, Kilmarnock	2014 Autumn Internationals	22 November 2014	Win	37-12
7	France	Stade de France, Paris	2015 Rugby World Cup warm-ups	5 September 2015	Loss	19-16
8	Japan	Kingsholm Stadium, Gloucester	2015 Rugby World Cup	23 September 2015	Win	10-45
9	South Africa	St James' Park, Newcastle upon Tyne	2015 Rugby World Cup	3 October 2015	Loss	16-34
10	Samoa	St James' Park, Newcastle upon Tyne	2015 Rugby World Cup	10 October 2015	Win	33-36
11	Australia	Twickenham Stadium, London	2015 Rugby World Cup	18 October 2015	Loss	35-34
12	Wales	Millennium Stadium, Cardiff	2016 Six Nations	13 February 2016	Loss	27-23
13	Italy	Stadio Olimpico, Rome	2016 Six Nations	27 February 2016	Win	20-36
14	Georgia	Rugby Park, Kilmarnock	2016 Autumn Internationals	26 November 2016	Win	43-16
15	Wales	Murrayfield Stadium, Edinburgh	2017 Six Nations	25 February 2017	Win	29-13
16	Italy	Murrayfield Stadium, Edinburgh	2017 Six Nations	18 March 2017	Win	29-0
17	Fiji	Murrayfield Stadium, Edinburgh	2018 Autumn Internationals	10 November 2018	Win	54-17
18	Fiji	Murrayfield Stadium, Edinburgh	2018 Autumn Internationals	10 November 2018	Win	54-17
19	Fiji	Murrayfield Stadium, Edinburgh	2018 Autumn Internationals	10 November 2018	Win	54-17
20	Russia	Shizuoka Stadium, Shizuoka	2019 Rugby World Cup	9 October 2019	Win	0-61
