= Seán O'Brien (rugby union, born 1987) =

Irish rugby union player

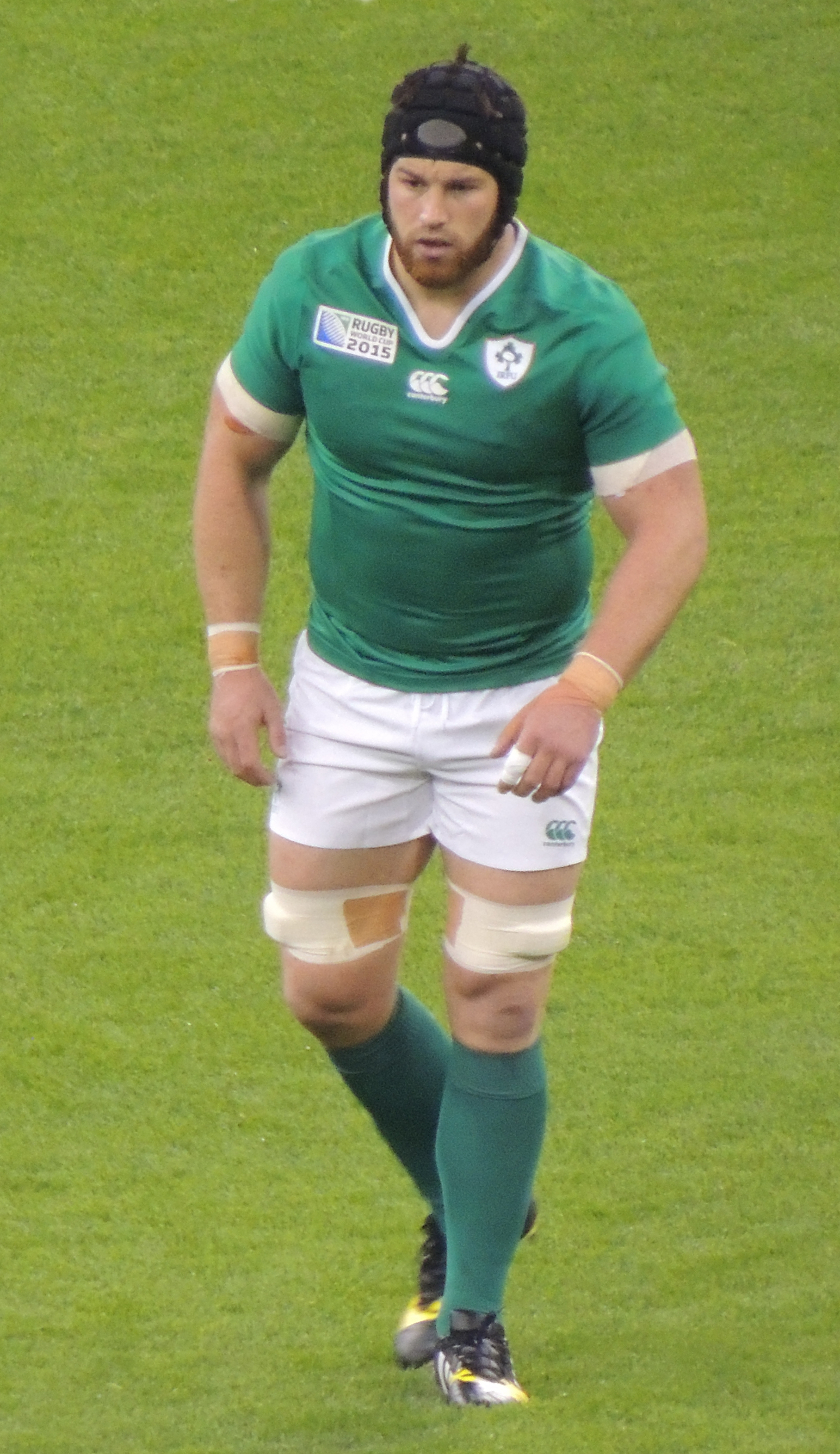
- O'Brien playing for Ireland during the 2015 Rugby World Cup
- Born: Seán Kevin O'Brien; 14 February 1987 (age 39) Carlow, Ireland
- Height: 1.88 m (6 ft 2 in)
- Weight: 108 kg (17.0 st; 238 lb)
- School: Tullow Community School
- University: University College Dublin; Griffith College Dublin

Rugby union career
- Position(s): Flanker, Number 8
Youth career
- Tullow
Amateur team(s)
Years	Team	Apps	(Points)
- UCD
Senior career
Years	Team	Apps	(Points)
2008–2019	Leinster	126	(100)
2019–2022	London Irish	28	(0)
- Correct as of 16 March 2021
International career
Years	Team	Apps	(Points)
2006	Ireland U21	8	
2007	Ireland U20	2	(0)
2009–2015	Ireland Wolfhounds	5	
2009–2019	Ireland	56	(30)
2013, 2017	British & Irish Lions	5	(5)
- Correct as of 16 March 2019

Seán Kevin O'Brien (born 14 February 1987) is an Irish retired professional rugby union player. He previously represented home province Leinster for eleven seasons. At Leinster, he helped the team win four European titles, and was named ERC European Player of the Year for the 2010–11 season, he then played three seasons for English Premiership Rugby side London Irish.

Internationally, he played for Ireland for ten years, and toured twice with the British & Irish Lions in 2013 and 2017. O'Brien could play across the back-row, though he primarily played as an openside flanker. He announced his retirement from rugby in 2022.

== Professional career ==
=== Leinster ===
O’Brien made his Leinster debut against Cardiff Blues in September 2008 in the Celtic League. He made his Heineken Cup debut against Castres Olympique in December 2008. He did not feature for Leinster in the 2009 Heineken Cup Final, but evidence of O’Brien's emergence as one of the most exciting young back-row forwards in Europe came in the form of strong interest from France before Christmas of 2010. The Irish Rugby Football Union moved quickly and O’Brien agreed a new three-year deal with Leinster the following January.

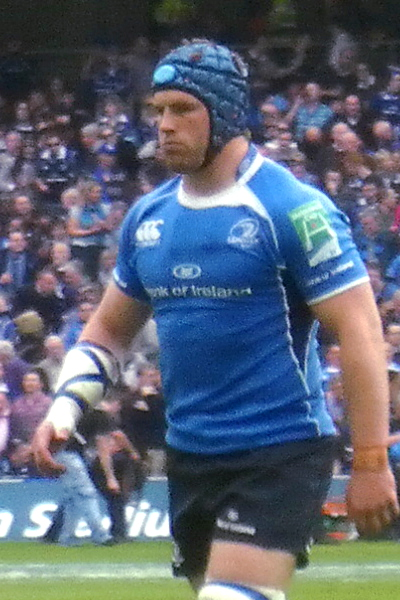
Sean O'Brien in Leinster gear.

O'Brien was in outstanding form for Leinster during the pool stages of the 2010–11 Heineken Cup, and was an integral part of the team that beat Northampton Saints to win the 2011 Heineken Cup Final. In 2012 O'Brien helped Leinster win the 2012 Heineken Cup Final, scoring a try as Leinster beat Ulster. In January 2014, O'Brien signed a new two-year deal with Leinster. On 21 December 2015, O'Brien signed a new three-year contract with Leinster.

=== London Irish ===
O'Brien joined English Premiership side London Irish, where former Ireland head coach Declan Kidney and assistant coach Les Kiss are director of rugby and head coach respectively, in December 2019, after the completion of the 2019 Rugby World Cup. O'Brien made his debut against Sale Sharks on 6 March 2020. He retired from rugby at the conclusion of the 2021–22 season.

== Ireland and British & Irish Lions ==
In 2007, he was a member of the Ireland Under-20 Grand Slam winning squad. O'Brien was called up to the Ireland team for the 2009 November Tests, and he gained his first cap when he came on as a substitute against Fiji at the RDS Arena on 21 November 2009. He also came on as a replacement against South Africa in a 15–10 win on 28 November 2009. He came off the bench against Italy in the 2010 Six Nations Championship, but was dropped afterwards. He was injured during Ireland's 2010 Summer Tests, but won his first start against Samoa in the 2010 Autumn Tests, though he did not feature in any other games. O'Brien started every game for Ireland during the 2011 Six Nations, winning the Man of the Match award against Italy. He came third in the 2011 Six Nations Player of the Championship losing out to the winner Andrea Masi. He was selected in Ireland's final 30-man squad for the 2011 Rugby World Cup in New Zealand. O'Brien started against Australia, Russia, Italy and Wales during Ireland's World Cup campaign, scoring a try against Russia and winning the Man-of-the-Match award against Italy. O’Brien was ranked among the five best players at the 2011 World Cup, due in significant part to his standout performance against Australia where he led the team in both tackles and runs.

O’Brien did not play for Ireland during 2014 due lingering problems from a shoulder injury. In the final 2015 Rugby World Cup Pool D match, O'Brien punched Pascal Papé in the first minute of the win over France. The incident went unnoticed by the match officials, and O'Brien later was named man of the match. The win earned Ireland top pool placement, and a quarter-final against Argentina. O'Brien was later cited by World Rugby, and received a one-game ban (reduced from the recommended minimum of two for mitigating factors including an "exemplary disciplinary record"), meaning he was unable to play in the quarter-final.

O’Brien last played for Ireland in the 2019 Six Nations. He missed the 2019 Rugby World Cup due to a hip injury. After joining London Irish in 2020 O'Brien said that he would love to play for Ireland again but he is aware of the unwritten rule in Irish rugby regarding players based overseas not being selected for the national team and he doesn't see this being any different for himself.

== Awards ==
O'Brien was named 2010–2011 ERC European Player of the Year following a season where Leinster were Heineken Cup champions. He was one of five players shortlisted from the 24 Heineken Cup and 20 Amlin Challenge Cup teams that included Leinster teammates Jamie Heaslip and Isa Nacewa. O’Brien was ranked by the IRB among the five best players at the 2011 Rugby World Cup. O'Brien was awarded the 2011 Guinness/Rugby Writers of Ireland player of the year and received his award at a function in the Aviva Stadium, Dublin.

== Personal life ==
In September 2014, he bought Bellamy's Pub in Ballsbridge with Leinster teammates Rob Kearney, Dave Kearney and Jamie Heaslip. After an extensive refurbishment, it was reopened as "The Bridge 1859". They have all since opened Blackrock Bar And plan to open a smaller lemon duke restaurant called ‘Little Duke”.

Since 2018, O'Brien had been in a relationship with Sarah Rowe. They broke up in December 2020.
