= Sonny Bill Williams =

New Zealand dual-code international rugby footballer

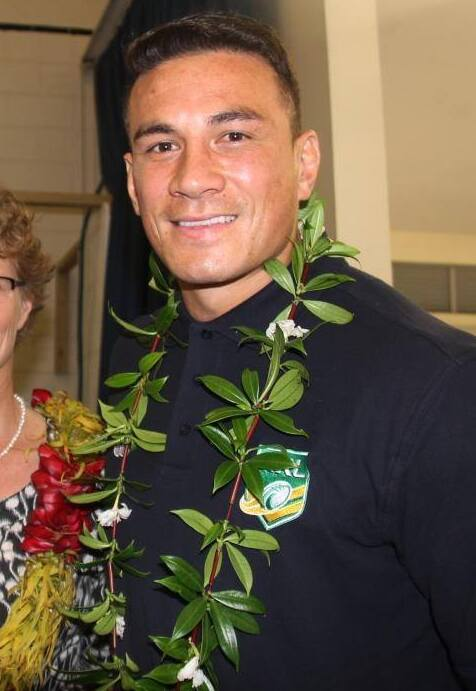

Personal information
- Full name: Sonny William Williams
- Born: 3 August 1985 (age 41) Auckland, New Zealand
- Height: 191 cm (6 ft 3 in)
- Weight: 108 kg (17 st 0 lb; 238 lb)

Playing information

Rugby league
- Position: Second-row, Centre, Lock
Club
Years	Team	Pld	T	G	FG	P
2004–08	Canterbury Bulldogs	73	31	0	0	124
2013–14	Sydney Roosters	45	11	0	0	44
2020	Toronto Wolfpack	5	0	0	0	0
2020	Sydney Roosters	5	0	0	0	0
	Total	128	42	0	0	168
Representative
Years	Team	Pld	T	G	FG	P
2004–13	New Zealand	12	5	0	0	20

Rugby union
- Position: Centre, Wing
Club
Years	Team	Pld	T	G	FG	P
2008–10	Toulon	33	6	0	0	30
2010	Canterbury	7	4	0	0	20
2011	Crusaders	15	5	0	0	25
2012, 2014–2016	Chiefs	28	6	0	0	30
2012	Panasonic Wild Knights	7	2	0	0	10
2014–19	Counties Manukau	3	0	0	0	0
2017–19	Blues	18	1	0	0	5
	Total	111	24	0	0	120
Representative
Years	Team	Pld	T	G	FG	P
2010–19	New Zealand	58	13		0	80
2016	New Zealand Sevens	7	4	0	0	20
- Source: As of 16 July 2022
- Relatives: Niall Guthrie (sister); Henry Perenara (cousin); Marcus Perenara (cousin)

Sonny William Williams (born 3 August 1985) is a New Zealand professional boxer, and a former professional rugby league and rugby union footballer. He is only the second person to represent New Zealand in rugby union after first playing for the country in rugby league, and is one of only 44 players to have won the Rugby World Cup twice.

Williams began his career in rugby league, and has played as a second-row forward over eight seasons in three spells in the National Rugby League (NRL), with the Canterbury-Bankstown Bulldogs and Sydney Roosters. He has won 12 caps for New Zealand (the Kiwis) and won the RLIF Awards for Rookie of the Year in 2004 and International Player of the Year in 2013. In 2020 he played for the Toronto Wolfpack in Super League, before moving to Sydney Roosters the same year.

He first moved to rugby union in 2010 and played mainly as a centre for Toulon in France, Canterbury, Counties Manukau, the Crusaders, Chiefs and Blues in New Zealand and Panasonic Wild Knights in Japan. He won 58 caps for New Zealand (the All Blacks), and was part of the teams that won the 2011 and 2015 World Cups. He also played rugby sevens for New Zealand, competing in the 2015–16 World Rugby Sevens Series and the 2016 Olympics. He retired from both rugby codes in March 2021.

Williams has boxed professionally eleven times in the heavyweight division. He was the New Zealand Professional Boxing Association (NZPBA) Heavyweight Champion and World Boxing Association (WBA) International Heavyweight Champion, but was stripped of these titles after failing to respond to challenges.

== Early life ==
Williams was born on 3 August 1985, in Auckland, New Zealand, the son of a Samoan father, Ioane ("John") Williams and mother, Lee Woolsey who is a Pākehā New Zealander of English descent whose mother (Williams' maternal grandmother) was from Australia. He has an older brother, John Arthur, and younger twin sisters, Niall and Denise.

Williams grew up in a working-class family in a state house in the Auckland suburb of Mount Albert. In describing his struggling family background, Williams later said that the "driving factor" in his pursuit of playing professional rugby league was to "get my mum a house." He attended Owairaka School, Wesley Intermediate and Mount Albert Grammar School. As a child he has been described as being a "small, skinny white kid" who was "painfully shy", as well as "a freakish sporting talent, a competitive sprinter, a champion high jumper and cross country runner and the kid who played footy in teams a couple of age divisions above, to make things fairer." Despite being tipped to have a promising future in athletics, Williams abandoned it when he was about twelve years old. Though his father was an accomplished rugby league player, Williams has said it was his mother who introduced him to the game.

== Rugby league ==
Williams was a Marist Saints junior when he was spotted playing in Auckland by Bulldogs talent scout John Ackland. In 2002 he was offered a contract and moved to Sydney (as the youngest player to ever sign with an NRL club) to play in the Bulldogs' junior grades. While training professionally, Williams worked full-time as a labourer. He advanced up the ranks quickly: becoming a starting player in the forward pack for the Bulldogs' Jersey Flegg Cup side in his first year. The following year Williams cemented a starting spot in the Premier League side. He also represented NSW as a junior; however, in 2013, when the NSW team investigated whether he could represent them in State of Origin, it was found that he only met two of the five necessary qualifications.

=== 2004–08: Canterbury-Bankstown Bulldogs ===
In 2004, when eighteen years old, Williams made his NRL debut for Canterbury-Bankstown against the Parramatta Eels at Telstra Stadium. In 2004, he was selected by New Zealand after only a handful of NRL games and on 23 April made his debut for the Kiwis as their youngest-ever Test player in the 2004 ANZAC Test against Australia. He had previously played for the Junior Kiwis. Williams played fifteen NRL matches during the season, establishing himself in the Canterbury squad. He experienced premiership success in his debut season and became the youngest person to play for Canterbury-Bankstown Bulldogs in a grand final when playing off the bench in the Bulldogs' 16–13 victory over the Sydney Roosters in the 2004 NRL Grand Final. Williams capped a successful debut season by receiving the 2004 RLIF Awards' International Newcomer of the Year Award and being named in Rugby League World magazine's 2004 World XIII. As 2004 NRL premiers, Canterbury-Bankstown faced Super League IX champions, the Leeds Rhinos, in the 2005 World Club Challenge, which Canterbury lost 32–39.

Williams's contract was due to expire in 2005, and he received several offers to lure him away from the Bulldogs. The largest offer was rumoured to be about $3 million from UK Super League club St Helens. Williams decided to stay with Canterbury-Bankstown and signed on for a further two years. St Helens chairman Eamonn McManus later said the club had not made an offer to him.

Williams had a shortened 2005 season after sustaining a severe knee injury and several minor injuries. He played five games throughout the year and subsequently missed several internationals for New Zealand. Williams expressed his frustration, stating "You've got to be pretty strong mentally when you have injuries, and I've had a few." Williams later adamantly dismissed claims he was injury prone.

Williams stayed relatively injury-free throughout the 2006 season, playing in 21 matches and scoring eight tries. The Canterbury-Bankstown club were beaten in the preliminary final by eventual premiers the Brisbane Broncos. However, off-season surgery forced Williams to miss the Tri-Nations for New Zealand for the second consecutive year.

In the first game of the 2007 season, Williams was sent off and subsequently suspended for two weeks for a high tackle on Andrew Johns. He thus became the first player of the 21st century to be sent off in a first-round game. Speculation surrounding Williams's playing future ended when he re-signed with Canterbury on 9 March 2007 for a five-year contract worth over $2.5 million, extending through to the 2012 season. Williams was selected to play for the Kiwis as a second-row forward in the 2007 Anzac Test loss against Australia. He went on to play in 21 matches for the Bulldogs; scored fourteen tries and topped the competition, for the second successive year, for most offloads. However, Williams broke his forearm in a tackle on Nathan Hindmarsh during the semi-final against the Parramatta Eels. His team lost the match, and Williams was again ruled out from representing New Zealand in the post-season 2007 Great Britain Tour. He was nominated for 'Second-Rower of the Year' at the 2007 Dally M Awards; however, Manly-Warringah Sea Eagles second-rower Anthony Watmough won the award.

=== 2013–14: Sydney Roosters ===
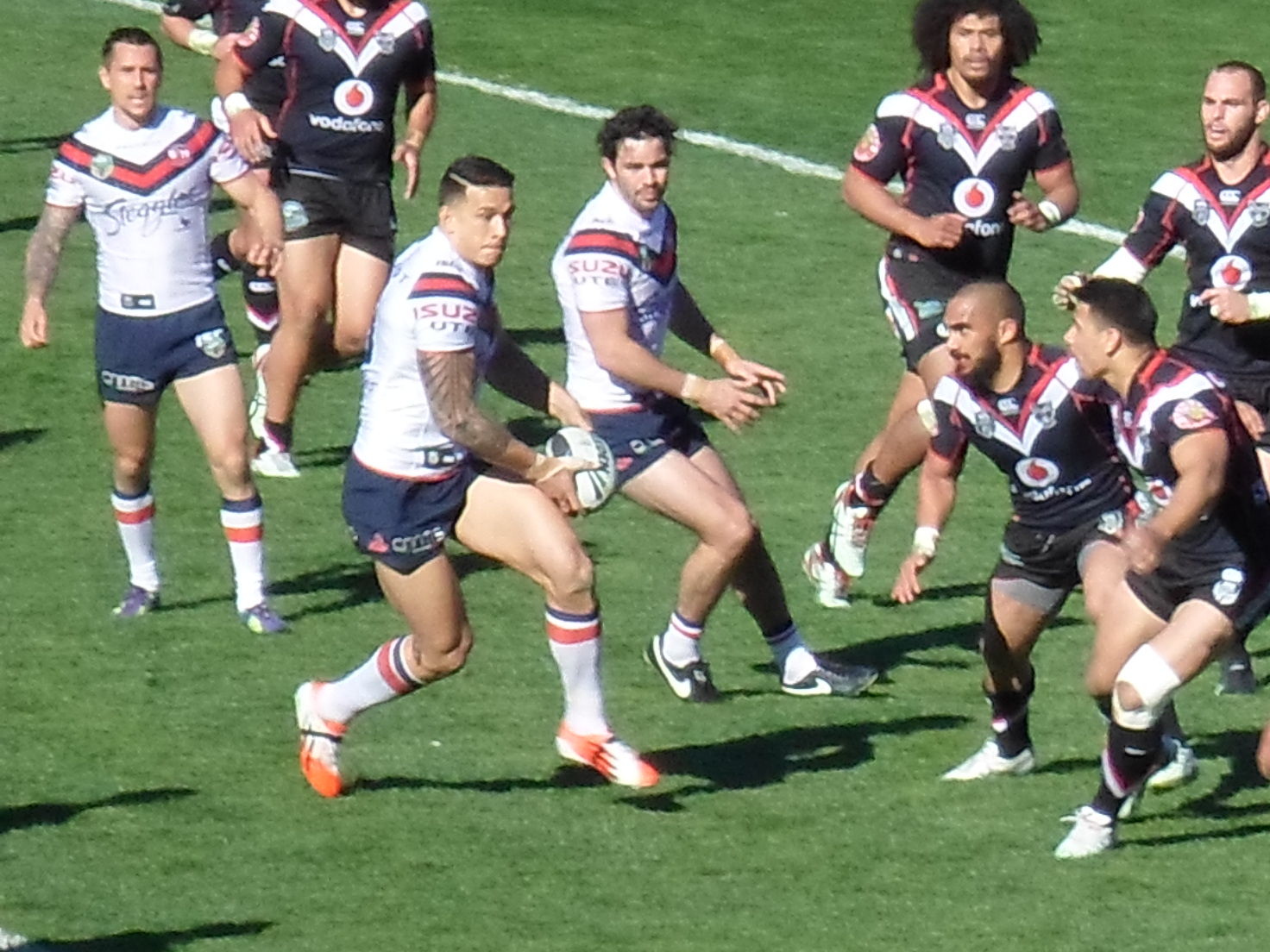
Williams playing for the Roosters.

On 13 November 2012, Williams confirmed he would be returning to rugby league after signing a one-year deal with the Sydney Roosters for the 2013 NRL season. His return was undertaken to honour a handshake agreement with Roosters chairman Nick Politis. It took over a month before his contract was officially approved and registered by the Australian Rugby League Commission; he was "frogmarched into League Central to be grilled as part of the probe" into his contract. Williams's return coincided with the banning of the shoulder charge, a manoeuvre of which he has been described as the best and most famous exponent.

On 7 March, Williams made his debut for the Roosters before a record first round crowd and television audience; he also scored his first try for his new club. On 1 April, Williams scored his second try in the Roosters' 50–0 win over the Eels—their biggest ever victory against Parramatta and the first time they had kept their opposition scoreless in consecutive matches since 1999. On 12 April he scored twice in his first encounter against the Canterbury-Bankstown Bulldogs, with the 38–0 result being the Roosters' largest ever victory over Canterbury. On 5 May he scored his fifth try against the Panthers. On 16 June, Williams scored his sixth try against the Warriors. On 28 July, Williams scored his seventh try against Newcastle, but he was given a two match suspension for a grade three careless high tackle on former Canterbury-Bankstown Bulldogs teammate Willie Mason. On 19 August, after returning from suspension, Williams scored his eighth try against the Wests Tigers. On 6 September he was named man-of-the-match as the Roosters claimed the NRL minor premiership and J. J. Giltinan Shield against the Rabbitohs in front of a record NRL regular season crowd of 59,708. On 6 October, Williams played in the grand final against Manly, with the Roosters claiming the premiership 26–18. Williams later said of the victory "I didn't cry, but it was the first time I've come close to crying." Subsequently, he was awarded the Jack Gibson Medal as the Roosters' player of the year. Several days later he announced that he would continue playing for the Roosters into 2014—the first time he had played consecutive seasons for one team since leaving Toulon in 2010.

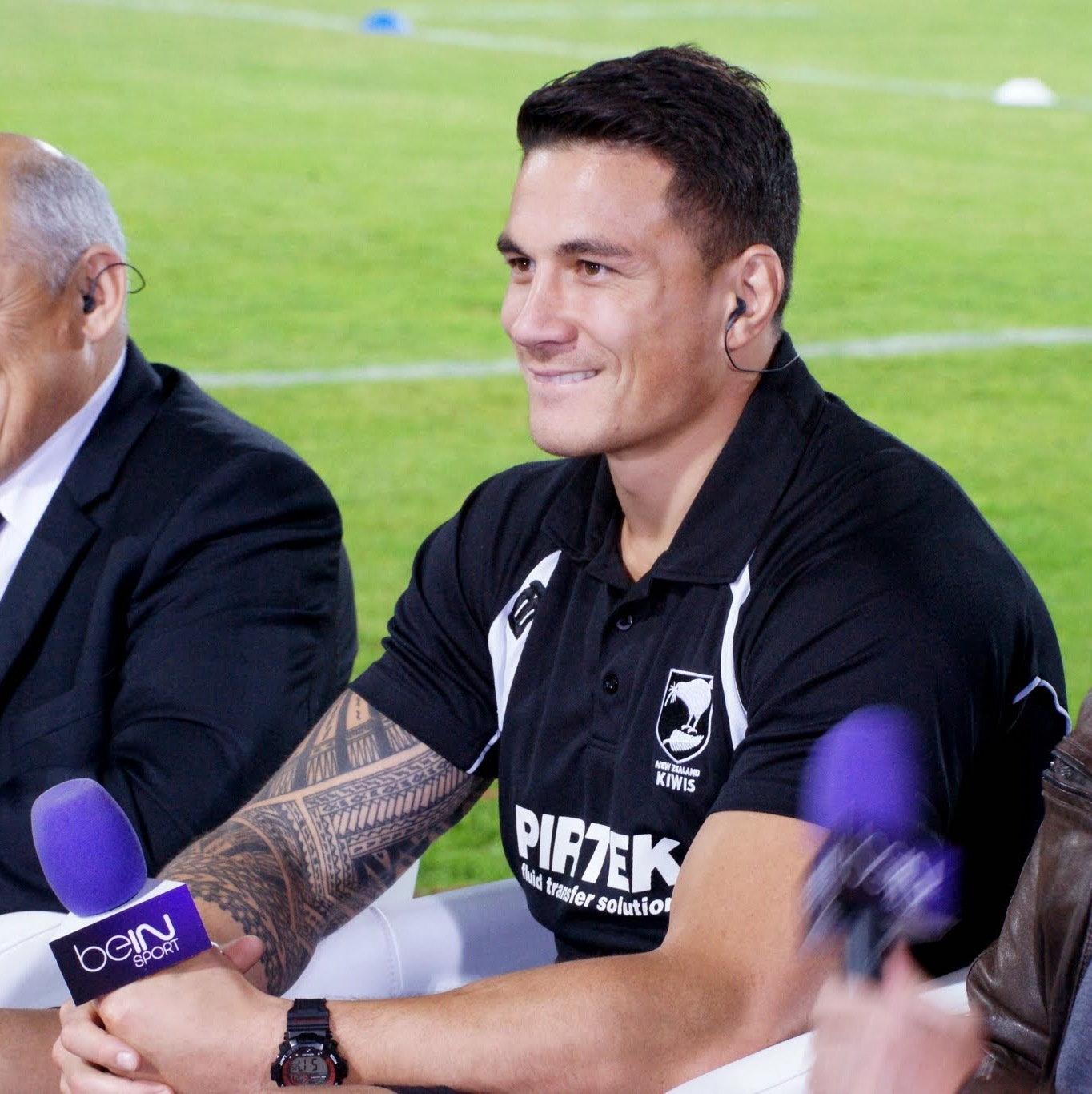
Williams during the 2013 RLWC.

Following the NRL season, Williams announced himself unavailable for international selection. As a result, New Zealand named a 24-man squad without him; however, after reversing his self-exclusion he was added to the squad at the expense of Tohu Harris. On 27 October, Williams played in his first Test game in over five years—and his first victory for the Kiwis—while playing against Samoa. In his second game of the tournament, Williams scored three tries against Papua New Guinea, in a man-of-the-match performance. In the week leading up to the final, Williams was awarded the Rugby League International Federation's 'International Player of the Year' award for 2013; he cried when his teammates performed an impromptu haka for him at the award ceremony. He went on to play in the World Cup final, where New Zealand were defeated by Australia.

On 6 March 2014, Williams and the Roosters began the 2014 NRL season with a loss to rivals the Rabbitohs; he was suspended for three games as a result of a shoulder charge on George Burgess in the final minute of the game. He returned in round five in a loss to the Bulldogs. On 12 April, Williams played his 100th NRL game against Parramatta—the same club he marked his debut against with the Bulldogs. On 23 May he scored twice against the Bulldogs to register his first points of the season. On 8 June, Williams scored his third try against the Melbourne Storm. Following the game against Newcastle, he revealed he had suffered a fractured thumb and would be sidelined for up to four weeks. During his recovery he was a guest host on the Nine Network's Footy Show and was part of a high-profile delegation to launch the NRL's Pacific Strategy in Samoa. After missing three games, Williams returned against the Warriors. On 26 September, Williams's two-year tenure in the NRL ended following the minor premiers' preliminary final loss to the Rabbitohs. However, Williams did not rule out a return to the Roosters in the future.

=== 2019–20: Toronto Wolfpack ===
In February 2019, Williams was linked with a move to Toronto Wolfpack, the first Canadian professional club to play in the British rugby league system. After their promotion to the Super League, Williams agreed to switch back to rugby league and signed for the club on 7 November. The two-year deal was reportedly worth up to $10 million.

=== 2020: Return to Bondi, Second Stint at the Sydney Roosters ===
Following the Wolfpack announcing their withdrawal due to financial constraints which were enforced by the aftermath of the COVID-19 pandemic, rumours had circled around the NRL that the league would loosen the contracting rules to allow for clubs to bring some of these team-less players in limbo to come back & play in the NRL if a club would sign them.

Subsequently, the injury-ravaged Sydney Roosters, who at one stage were missing 11 of their top 17. The superstar forward was paid $150,000 to play the last four rounds of the competition and finals in their attempt to complete their premiership hat-trick. Williams' Toronto teammate, Ricky Leutele signed with rivals Melbourne Storm for the remainder of 2020. Williams returned against the Canberra Raiders in round 17 off the interchange bench playing 13 minutes, Williams made four runs for 23 metres, one offload and 5 tackles, in his team's 18–6 victory.

His final game would be the loss in the home semi-final against Canberra at the Sydney Cricket Ground.

Williams announced his retirement via Instagram in early 2021, days after former Crusaders and dual World Cup-winning All Black teammate Dan Carter.

== Rugby union ==
=== 2008–10: Toulon ===
In July 2008, after linking up with new manager Khoder Nasser, Williams left Australia to join the Tana Umaga coached French rugby union club Toulon. In his controversial mid-season exit from the NRL, Williams cited salary cap concerns for his move. In 2005 it had been suggested that the NRL's salary cap restrictions could prove problematic in trying to keep top-grade players in rugby league. The Canterbury Bulldogs club officials and players were not notified of his departure until after Williams had already left for Europe using a Samoan passport. Williams was eighteen months into a five-year contract with the Bulldogs, and the dispute was only resolved when Toulon paid a transfer fee of around £300,000 (A$750,000). According to the Bulldogs CEO Todd Greenberg, Williams was "our best player [before he] walked out". The circumstances in which he left the Bulldogs created a media debate in Australia and New Zealand, and Williams was the subject of considerable criticism for a departure that was described as the greatest act of treachery in the game's history.

Williams's highest honour with Toulon was finishing runner-up in the 2009–10 European Challenge Cup. On 6 June 2009 he played for the Barbarians in a tour match against Australia. His contract with Toulon ended in June 2010; in the same year Toulon reportedly tabled a three-year, $6 million offer to Williams, while the New Zealand Rugby Union (NZRU) came up with a $550,000 per year deal. He was also offered the chance to play for France at the 2011 World Cup. Williams rejected Toulon's offer, reportedly the largest in rugby union history, and opted to sign with the NZRU in a bid to play for the All Blacks. He then chose to play with Canterbury in the ITM Cup and the Crusaders in the Super Rugby competition.

=== 2010: Canterbury ===
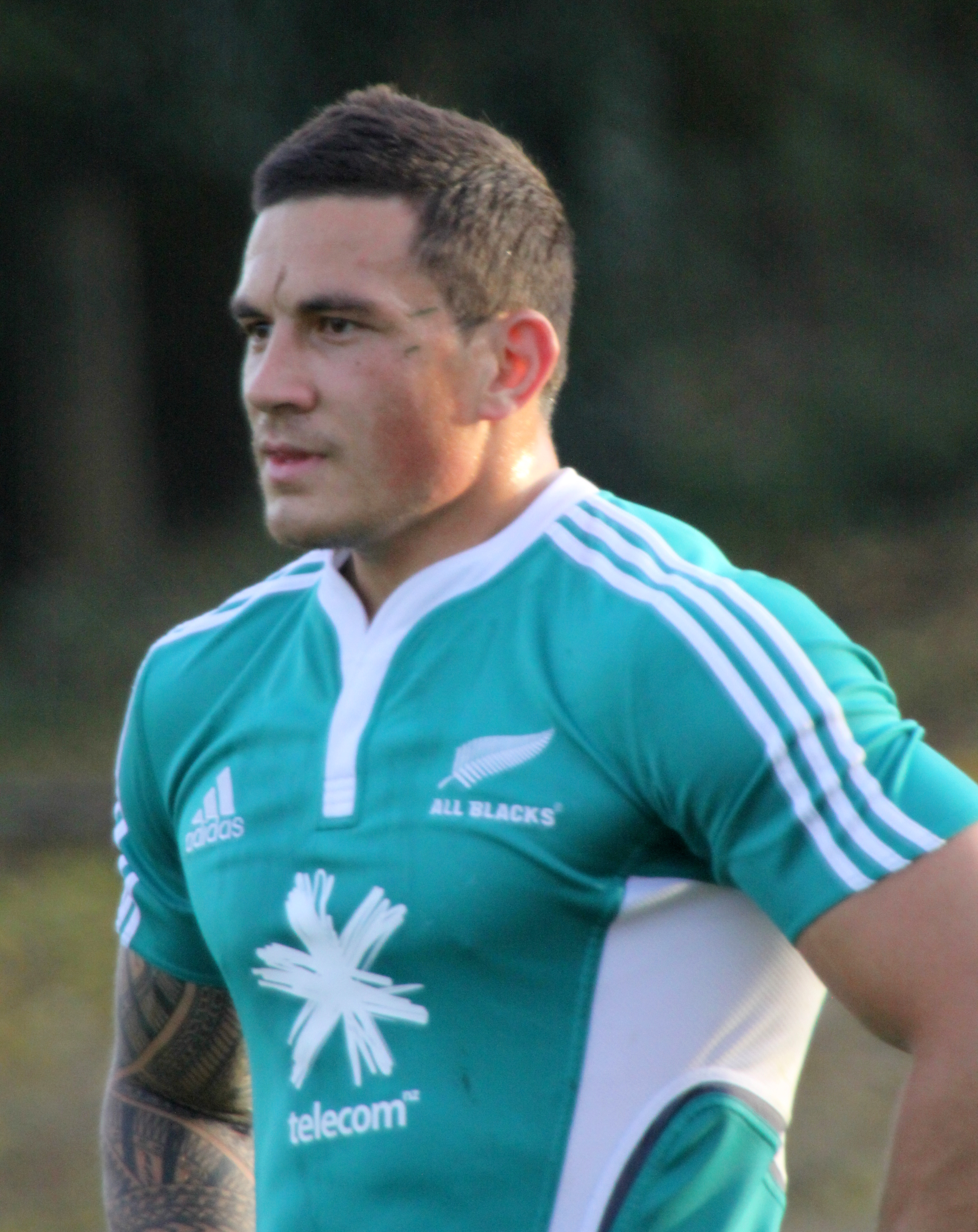
Williams at training for the All Blacks, 2010.

On 3 September, Williams made his Canterbury debut against Bay of Plenty after previously playing for the Belfast Rugby Football Club in the CBS Canterbury Cup. He was named in the reserves and eighteen minutes into the game replaced second five-eight Ryan Crotty. Williams scored his first try in Canterbury's ITM Cup loss to Taranaki; he followed up with tries against Wellington, Otago and Counties Manukau. On 9 October, Canterbury became the new holder of the Ranfurly Shield, and on 5 November they were crowned ITM Cup Champions after defeating Waikato 33–13. On 17 October, Williams was named in the All Blacks squad to tour Hong Kong and the Northern Hemisphere. This would make him only the fourth person to have played for the All Blacks before having played any Super Rugby, since Super Rugby exists.

He made his highly anticipated New Zealand debut at Twickenham against England on 6 November. He started at outside centre and combined with Ma'a Nonu to form the heaviest ever All Black midfield partnership at 212 kilograms (467 lb). In playing for the All Blacks he became the first person since Karl Ifwersen, in the 1920s, to represent New Zealand in rugby union after first playing for New Zealand in rugby league. On 13 November, in his second game for the All Blacks, Williams was awarded the man-of-the-match for his performance against Scotland.

=== 2011: Crusaders ===
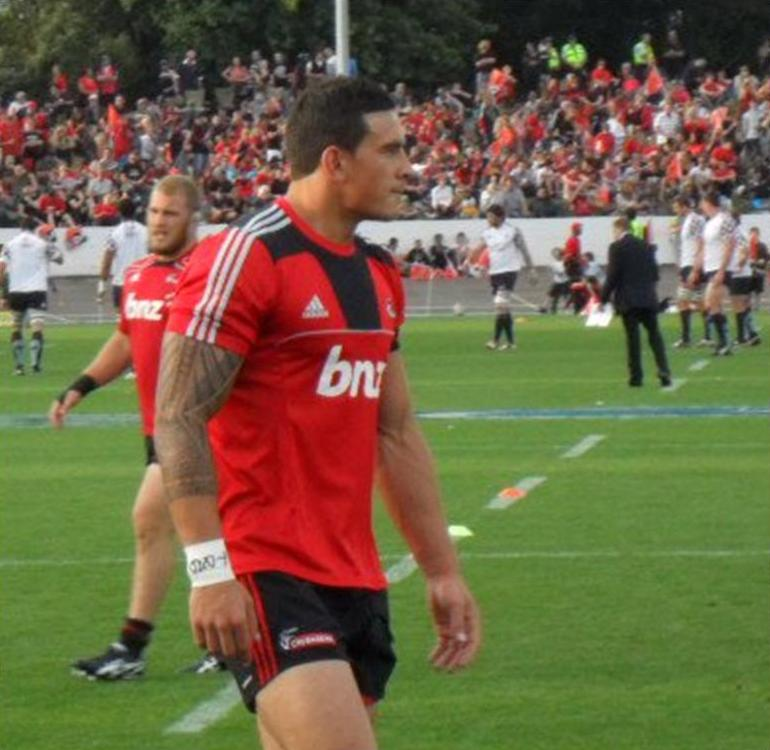
Williams playing for the Crusaders, 2011.

On 4 March, Williams made his 2011 Super Rugby debut for the Crusaders against the Waratahs, scoring a try and setting up another. A week later he scored his second try against the ACT Brumbies. On 27 March he returned to Twickenham to play against the Sharks in the first Super Rugby match played outside of New Zealand, Australia or South Africa. On 9 April, in his fifth game for the Crusaders, Williams scored his third try. On 23 April, Williams, playing off the reserves bench against the Highlanders, experienced his first rugby defeat since his All Black debut more than five months earlier. A week later he scored his fourth try while playing against the Western Force. On 7 May, Williams played his first rugby match in South Africa, in the Crusaders' victory over the Stormers at Newlands Stadium. On 29 May he played against the Queensland Reds in a match which set a new attendance record for an Australian Super Rugby game, with 48,301 fans at Suncorp Stadium. On 25 June he scored his fifth try while playing against the Sharks in the first finals week of the Super Rugby competition. A week later, against the Stormers in Cape Town, he was part of the Crusaders team that became the first side since 1999 to win a Super Rugby semi-final outside their home country. On 9 July, Williams was part of the Crusaders team which lost to the Reds in the grand final, held at Suncorp Stadium before an Australian provincial attendance record crowd of 52,113. He ended the Super Rugby season with the most off-loads, was second to Quade Cooper for line-break assists, was in the top ten for try assists and was 13th overall for run metres—no other centre came close to Williams's off-load and line-break assist figures. During his time in Christchurch, Williams was present when both the 2010 and 2011 Canterbury earthquakes struck.

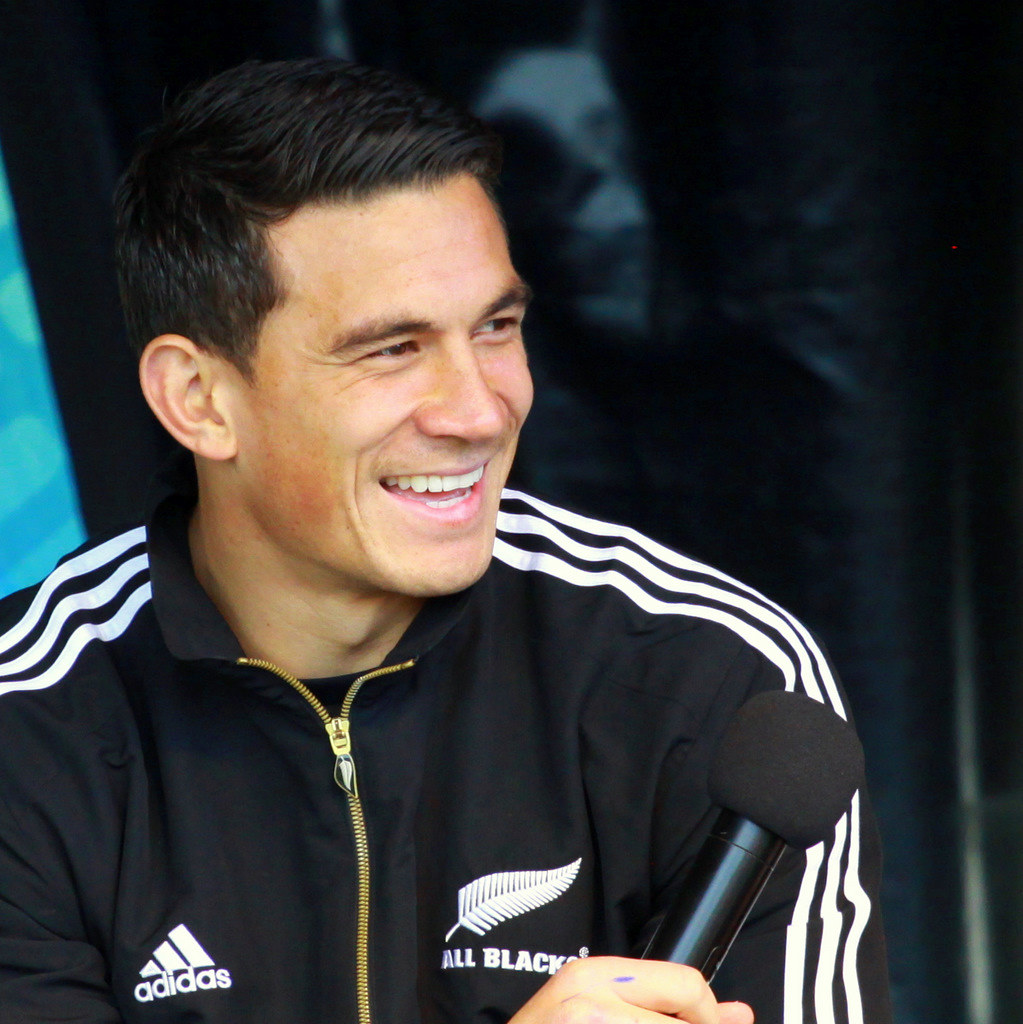
Williams playing for the All Blacks, 2011.

On 30 July, Williams played his first home test match during the second game of the 2011 Tri Nations Series. On 9 September he played in the opening match of the 2011 Rugby World Cup. A week later he scored his first test rugby tries during New Zealand's second game, in which he played on the right wing. The match was also the first time he had played outside the centres since playing in a handful of games on the wing and in the back row for Toulon. He scored his third try of the tournament against France, in his second consecutive game playing on the wing. On 2 October, Williams scored in his third consecutive match, whilst playing against Canada. New Zealand went on to win the tournament, with Williams amassing a Rugby World Cup record of three tries as a substitute player.

On 31 October it was announced that Williams would join the Chiefs for the 2012 Super Rugby season. His new contract allowed a "limited number" of professional boxing bouts.

=== 2012: Chiefs ===
On 25 February, Williams made his 2012 Super Rugby debut for the Chiefs against the Highlanders, In early March he was named as the NZRU's Teen Rugby Ambassador. On 14 April, Williams scored his first try for the Chiefs while playing against the Cheetahs. On 13 May he scored his second try in the Chiefs' first loss since their club record of nine consecutive wins. On 2 June he scored his third try while playing against the Blues. During the mid-year rugby test series, Williams played in all three of New Zealand's matches against Ireland, scoring two tries in the last game of the series. On 6 July he scored his fourth try for the Chiefs—this time against his former club, the Crusaders. On 4 August, Williams played in the Chiefs' 37–6 victory against the Sharks in the Super Rugby final, scoring the last try of the match then celebrating by leaping into the home crowd. With this victory, Williams became only the fourth person, after Peter Ryan, Brad Thorn and Will Chambers, to have won both an NRL and Super Rugby title. He also ended the season with the most off-loads (for a second consecutive year), most tackle busts, most line-breaks and most turnovers gained. He was also awarded the Chiefs' players' player award.

On 18 August, Williams played for the All Blacks in the first match of the inaugural Rugby Championship. The following week, he ended his two-year tenure in New Zealand rugby with a man-of-the-match performance in New Zealand's Bledisloe Cup winning 22–0 victory over Australia.

=== 2012–13: Panasonic ===
On 9 July 2012, Williams announced he would be playing for the Panasonic Wild Knights in the Japanese Top League during the 2012–13 season—with the allowance to have one boxing fight during the season—before returning to rugby league. The Panasonic deal was thought to be the largest one-season contract in rugby union history. He was also expected to be heavily involved in the promotion of the 2019 Rugby World Cup in Japan, the country being the main host of the event. On 9 September, a week after sitting out the Top League season opener to be given time to adjust after coming off recent All Blacks duties, Williams made his debut for Panasonic against NTT Communications Shining Arcs. On 22 September he scored his first try for Panasonic, while playing against Toshiba Brave Lupus. On 27 October, Williams scored his second try during Panasonic's eighth round victory over the Kintetsu Liners; however, the match would be his final game of the season after sustaining an injury when he landed awkwardly on his shoulder following a tackle.

=== 2014: Counties ===
On 20 December 2013 it was announced that Williams would return to rugby union with the Chiefs on a two-year deal starting in 2015. He also aimed to represent New Zealand in the 2015 Rugby World Cup and in rugby sevens at the 2016 Summer Olympics. On 15 June 2014, Williams signed a two-year deal, starting in 2015, to play in the ITM Cup with Counties Manukau—reuniting with his former Toulon coach Tana Umaga. However, on 8 October 2014 he started his contract with Counties a year early when he made his debut for the club against Auckland, only twelve days after his last game for the Roosters. He played the following game, which was also his club's final game of the season.

On 20 October, Williams was named in the All Blacks' squad to tour the US and UK in November. On 1 November, he made his return to international rugby against the United States, scoring twice in a man-of-the-match performance. He went on to play in every other game of the tour.

=== 2015: Chiefs ===
On 14 February, Williams marked his 2015 Super Rugby return to the Chiefs with a victory over the Blues in the first round. Two weeks later, he scored his first try of the season against his former club, the Crusaders. On 13 June, after being sidelined for a month with a back injury, Williams returned in the final round of the regular season. The following week, Williams was part of the Chiefs' team that lost to the Highlanders in the quarter-finals. Despite having played only ten of the sixteen regular season games, Williams had the second most offloads, and his nine line-break assists were the highest of any player with ten matches or less.

On 8 July, Williams played in New Zealand's first test of the year, in a historic match against Samoa. The following week he teamed up with Ma'a Nonu in the midfield against Argentina, in the opening match of the 2015 Rugby Championship. On 8 August, Williams played in New Zealand's loss against Australia in the Rugby Championship decider; he also sustained an injury which prevented him from playing in the following weeks' Bledisloe Cup match.

On 19 August, Williams was named in coach Gordon Tietjens' initial squad to represent New Zealand at the 2016 Summer Olympics in rugby sevens. Williams said he would commit to rugby sevens full-time following the Rugby World Cup and leading up to the Olympics, in an effort to make the final squad.

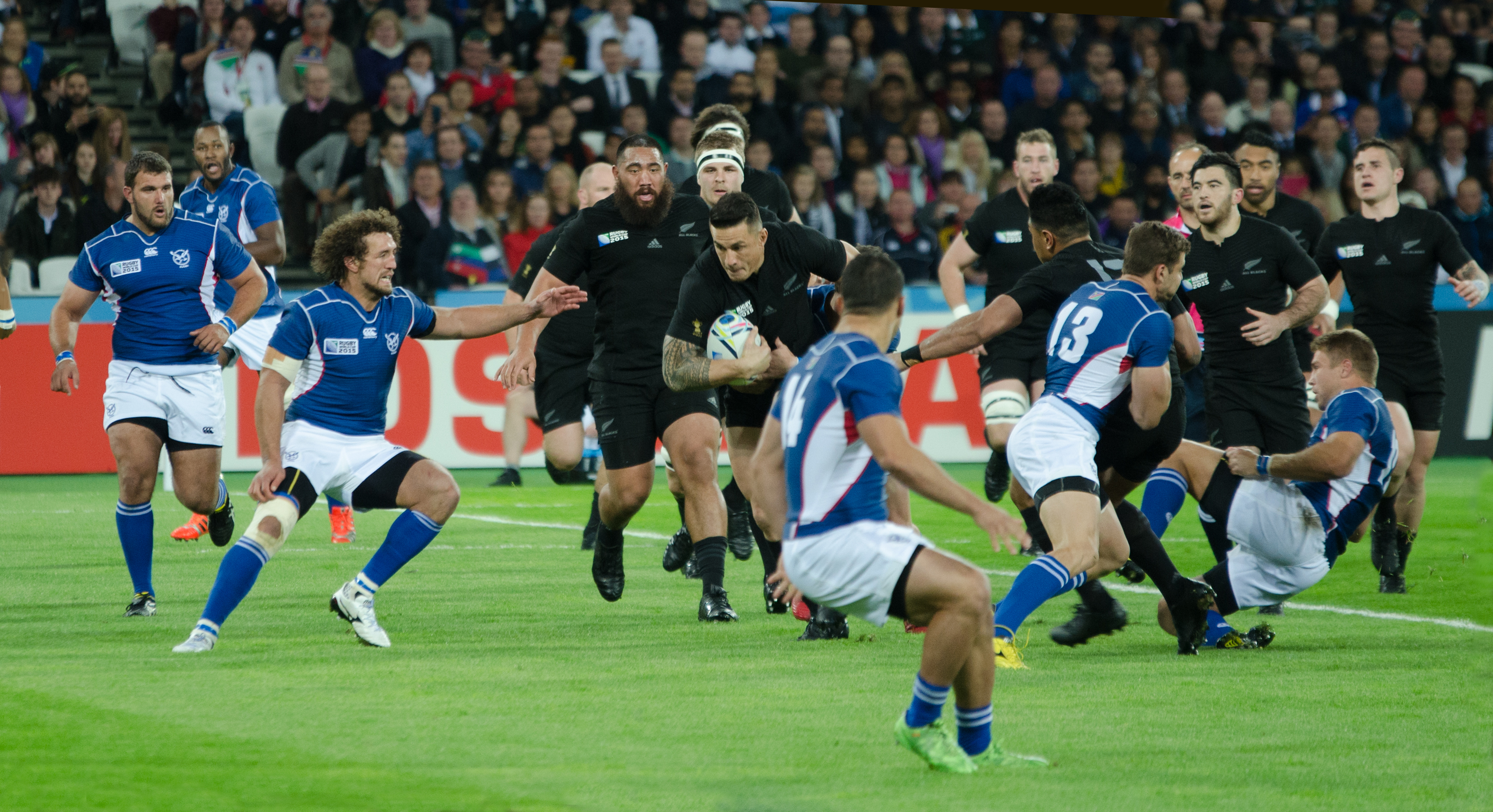
Williams during the 2015 Rugby World Cup.

On 30 August, Williams was named in New Zealand's 31-man squad for the 2015 Rugby World Cup. On 20 September, he played off the bench in New Zealand's opening game victory against Argentina. Four days later, Williams played in New Zealand's first-ever test match against Namibia. On 2 October, Williams played in New Zealand's first-ever test match against Georgia. The following week, he scored a try in New Zealand's final pool stage match against Tonga. On 17 October, Williams was a part of New Zealand's record-setting quarter-final victory against France, before playing in the semi-final victory against South Africa. He went on to play in New Zealand's victory against Australia in the final, before gifting his winner's medal to a 14-year old fan who had been tackled by a security guard during the lap of honour; however, he was presented with a second medal at the World Rugby Awards the following day. His performance during the tournament, along with those of his midfield partners, was praised by coach Steve Hansen: "Not only have we lost Ma'a and Conrad we've also lost Sonny. They were the three guys that set the World Cup on fire and allowed us to have a one, two, three punch."

=== 2016: Rugby sevens ===
On 11 January, Williams began training with the All Blacks Sevens team. However, his introduction to the sport and national team began at the 2015 Dubai Sevens, as a guest of the tournament, where he also witnessed the debut of his sister, Niall, for the New Zealand women's team. His inclusion in the international sevens arena has been "Touted as the biggest gain from the 15-a-side ranks". On 25 January, Williams was named in the squad for the 2016 Wellington Sevens. On 30 January, he marked his international debut against Russia, scoring a try with his first touch of the ball. He went on to play in the remainder of New Zealand's pool matches. The following day, Williams played in the quarter-final against Kenya, scored a try in the semi-final against England and played in the final's victory against South Africa. After Wellington, he played in the following 2016 Sydney Sevens, including the victory against Australia in the final. He was rested for the subsequent 2016 Las Vegas Sevens and was then ruled out of the 2016 Canada Sevens due to a swollen knee. Williams returned from injury against France in the 2016 Hong Kong Sevens and scored a try in the final pool stage game against Samoa. He went on to play in the quarter-final against Wales, the semi-final against South Africa and the loss against Fiji in the final. The following week he played in the 2016 Singapore Sevens, losing to Samoa in the second-tier Plate final. He went on to play in the 2016 Paris Sevens; however, his tournament was cut short by a knee injury. The following week he played in the 2016 London Sevens, the final tournament of the World Series, scoring a try against Russia. His tournament was again cut short, by an ankle injury early in the quarter-final loss to the United States, with New Zealand finishing the World Series in third place.

On 1 June, Williams announced he had signed a three-year deal (his longest commitment since 2008) to stay with New Zealand rugby until the 2019 Rugby World Cup and would be joining the Blues in 2017, linking with coach Tana Umaga for the third time in his rugby career.

On 3 July, Williams was selected to represent New Zealand in the men's rugby sevens at the 2016 Summer Olympics. His sister, Niall, was also selected to represent New Zealand in the women's tournament. On 9 August, in New Zealand's first game of the tournament, against Japan, Williams partially ruptured his Achilles tendon early in the second half. The injury ended Williams' Olympic campaign; New Zealand eventually finished in fifth place.

=== 2017–2019: Blues ===
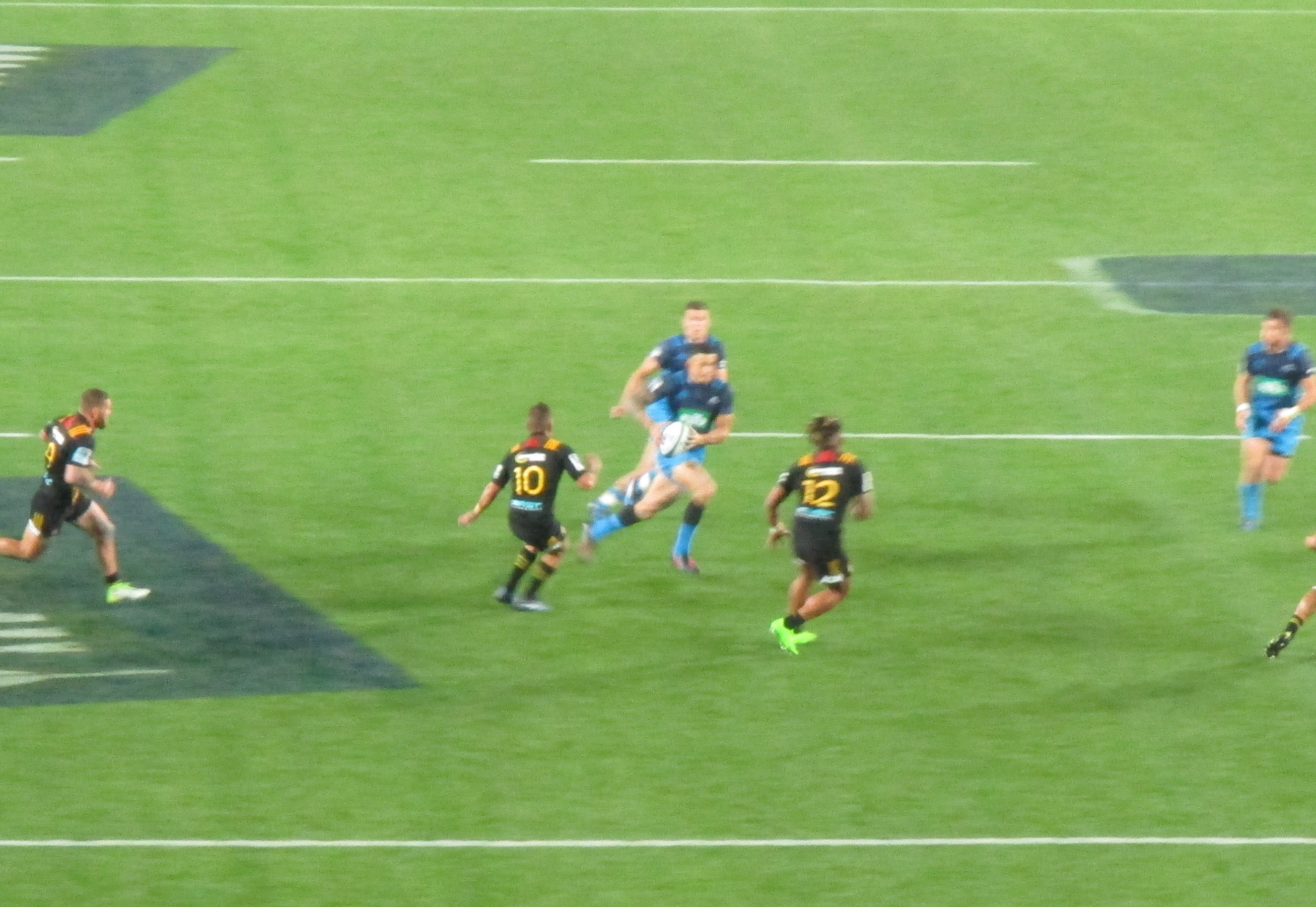
Sonny Bill Williams on the run against the Chiefs, 26 May 2017

In 2017 Williams was part of the Blues super rugby squad. Coming back from injury, his first game for the Blues was in April against the Highlanders, a game where he made headlines for taping over the BNZ logo on his jersey. After a patchy return from injury, Williams looked back in form when the Blues drew with the Chiefs on a rainy Auckland evening. Williams delivered a man of the match performance to help the Blues defeat the British and Irish Lions, 22–16. With time running out and the Lions in the lead, Williams gave an offload to Ihaia West to score the match-winning try.

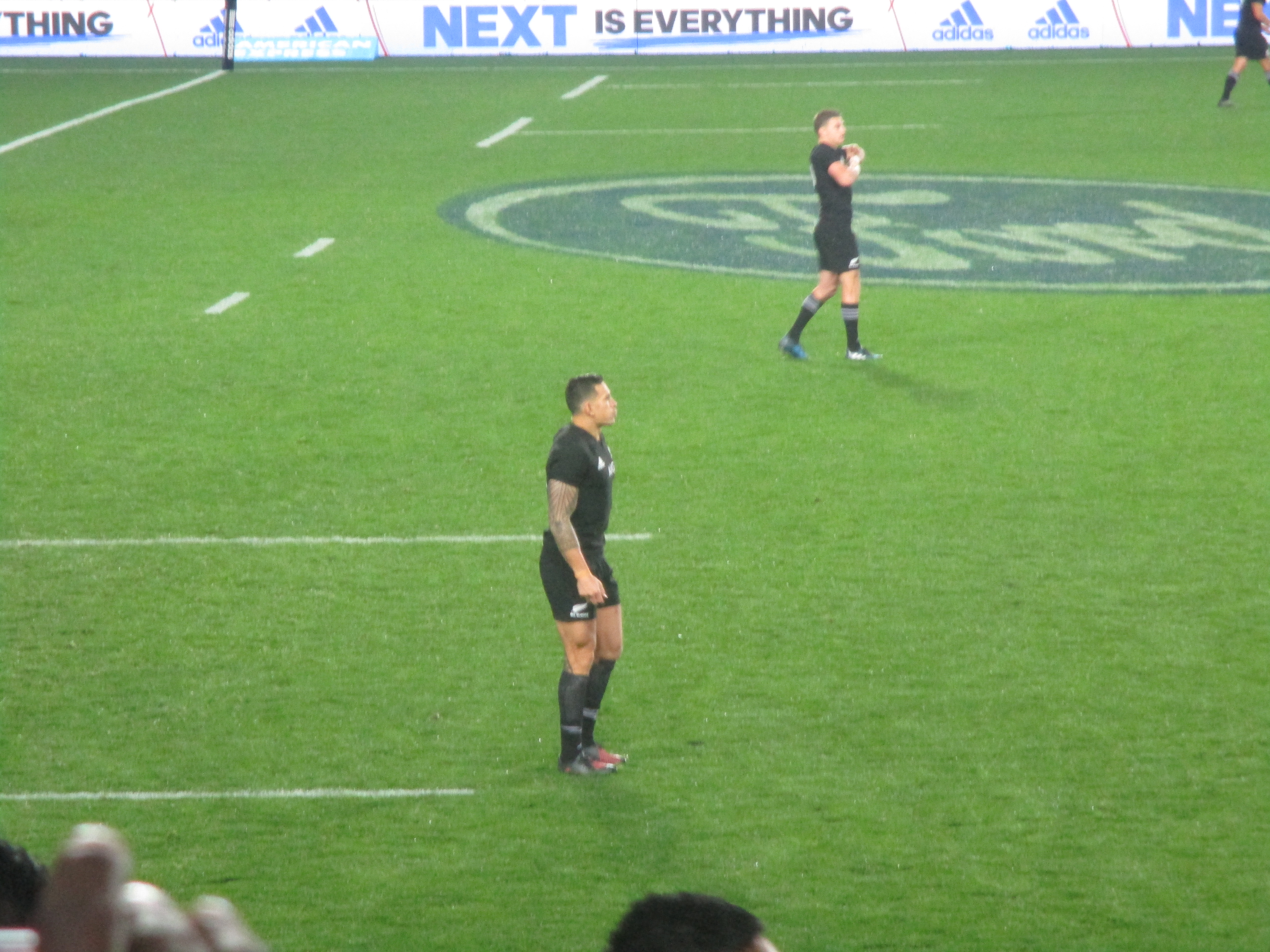
Sonny Bill Williams, playing against Samoa at Eden Park 2017

Williams returned to the All Blacks against Samoa at Eden Park in a solid performance, where he scored a try in a 78–0 win. A week later, he started at inside centre for the All Blacks in their victory against the British and Irish Lions in the first test. However, a week later in the second test, Williams became the first All Black to be sent off in 50 years after Colin Meads was sent off in 1967, and was also the first ever to be sent off in New Zealand, for shoulder charging Anthony Watson to the head. The All Blacks went on to lose the test 24–21. After serving his four-match suspension for his red card, Williams returned for the first Bledisloe Cup match of the year, where he scored a try in the All Blacks' record 54–34 victory. Williams started in all New Zealand's Rugby Championship matches, with the All Blacks winning all six, including a 57–0 victory over South Africa in Auckland.

Williams finished the year by starting for the All Blacks three times on the end-of-year tour. In all, Williams played in 13 tests in 2017.

After missing a large portion of the 2018 Super Rugby season due to injury, Williams made a return for New Zealand during the 2018 Rugby Championship, having previously played only one test during the year. He went on to play his 50th test for New Zealand, against Australia, during a 37–20 win. Although Williams reached the milestone, he only played one test, against England, during the end-of-season tour due to his continued injury problems.

On 28 August, All Blacks Head Coach, Steve Hansen named Williams as one of 31 players in New Zealand's squad for the 2019 Rugby World Cup, which was Williams' third World Cup. Williams joined teammates, Sam Whitelock and Kieran Read in the group of All Blacks to attend three World Cups.

Although this was Williams' third World Cup, he lost his place as a regular starter to Chiefs midfielder Anton Lienert-Brown, being used as a replacement for a pool stage test against eventual Champions, South Africa, as well as two of the playoff matches, against Ireland and England. After New Zealand lost to England 7–19, Williams made a start in his final test for New Zealand in the Bronze Final, a 40–17 win over Wales, which saw the All Blacks claim third place. Williams was one of five players to finish his international career for New Zealand that day, with Matt Todd, Ben Smith, Ryan Crotty and Captain, Kieran Read, all retiring that day, alongside Williams.

== Boxing ==
Sonny Bill Williams
Personal information
- Nickname: SBW
- Nationality: New Zealand
- Born: Sonny Bill Williams; 3 August 1985 (age 41) Auckland, New Zealand
- Height: 6 ft 3 in (191 cm)
- Weight: Heavyweight

Boxing career
- Stance: Orthodox

Boxing record
- Total fights: 11
- Wins: 9
- Win by KO: 4
- Losses: 2

On 27 May 2009, Williams made his debut as a professional boxer on the undercard of close friend Anthony Mundine, defeating Garry Gurr with a technical knockout (TKO) in the second round in Brisbane. On 30 June 2010 he defeated Ryan Hogan in a bout that ended by TKO after only two minutes and 35 seconds. Williams described the preparation for the fight as "good off-season training" for his imminent debut for the Canterbury rugby team.

=== Williams vs Lewis ===
On 29 January 2011, Williams fought in his third professional match against Australian Scott Lewis at the Gold Coast Convention Centre, in his first fight as the main event. Coincidentally, Lewis's trainer, Terry Devlin, named his youngest son after Williams—whom he called a "superb athlete". Williams was initially scheduled to fight Lewis on 29 January at the Newcastle Entertainment Centre; however, the bout was moved to the Gold Coast to cross-promote Williams's Super Rugby team, the Crusaders, and their pre-season game against the Queensland Reds. Due to the 2010–2011 Queensland floods occurring at the same time as Williams's preparation for his bout against Lewis, as well as his chief sparring partner, Alex Leapai, being stranded by the flooding in Gatton, Williams donated 200 tickets for the fight to flood victims. Williams won the six-round bout against Lewis by unanimous points decision: he was scored favourably 60–55, 60–55 and 60–54 by the three judges. A fan paid $3,890 for his autographed gloves from the bout, with the money going towards the Queensland flood relief fund.

=== Williams vs Liava'a ===
On 5 June 2011, Williams had his fourth fight when the Crusaders had a bye week. The fight, the second of three allowed under his agreement with the NZRU, took place at Trusts Stadium, West Auckland, against Tongan Alipate Liava'a. Williams won the bout by unanimous points decision: the fight scored 60–54 in his favour by all three judges. The event was promoted as a Christchurch earthquake charity fight dubbed The Clash For Canterbury. The fight became one of the single largest fundraisers for the 2011 Christchurch earthquake appeal when Sky donated its profits from the pay-per-view sales of the fight, and Williams made a $NZ100,000 donation from his share of TV sales—described as "one of the biggest individual donations by an athlete to a disaster appeal."

=== Williams vs Tillman ===
On 8 February 2012, Williams was supposed to fight Richard Tutaki for the vacant New Zealand Professional Boxing Association (NZPBA) Heavyweight Championship title at Claudelands Arena in Hamilton, after Shane Cameron vacated it to move down to the cruiserweight division. However, it was later revealed that Tutaki was facing serious criminal charges; so he was subsequently dropped from the fight card. Williams's replacement opponent was then announced to be Auckland-based American Clarence Tillman III. The fight was dubbed the Battle for the Belt. Williams went on to claim the title belt by technical knockout after a left hook and a series of further blows on Tillman forced referee Lance Revill to stop the fight in the first round. Following the bout, Williams rejected an offer to join the boxing stable of fight promoter Don King.

=== Williams vs Botha ===
On 24 November 2012, during the Japanese Top League's November break, Williams was due to fight South African former heavyweight contender Francois Botha at the Brisbane Entertainment Centre. However, the bout was postponed to 8 February 2013 after Williams required surgery for a right pectoral muscle injury sustained while playing for Panasonic on 27 October. The fight was for the vacant WBA International Heavyweight title. The event also marked the boxing debut of Williams's close friend and fellow rugby player, Quade Cooper, on the undercard. After dominating most rounds but on the verge of being knocked out in the last round, Williams went on to win the bout by unanimous points decision, with the judges scoring 98–94, 97–91 and 97–91 in his favour. However, the victory was marred by controversy because at late notice (and unbeknownst to most people) the fight was shortened to ten rounds, instead of the scheduled twelve. Australian National Boxing Federation committee member John Hogg later stated that the decision to cut the bout short was made just before the fight started, with the approval of officials and both Williams's and Botha's camps; however, Botha was not informed of the change by his own camp.

In October 2013, Williams revealed he would not fight again for at least another three years due to a lack of time as he pursued his footballing goals and commitments. This led to him being stripped of his two boxing titles in mid-December 2013.

=== Williams vs Welliver ===
On 31 January 2015, Williams prematurely returned to the ring when he fought American Chauncy Welliver at Allphones Arena in Sydney. Coincidentally, in 2012, during his stint playing rugby for Panasonic in Japan, Williams was ringside when Welliver fought Kyotaro Fujimoto. Included on Williams's undercards were fellow footballers Paul Gallen, Liam Messam and Willis Meehan. The event marked the inaugural Footy Show Fight Night and was broadcast, in a rare occurrence, live on free-to-air television channel GEM. Williams won the bout by unanimous points decision, with the judges scoring 80–72, 80–72 and 79–73 in his favour and Welliver praising his performance and potential.

=== Williams vs Falefehi ===
On 26 June 2021, in his first professional bout in over six years, Williams defeated Waikato Falefehi in a unanimous points decision 57–56, at the Townsville Entertainment Centre in Queensland, Australia. Williams was almost stunned after being knocked down with an eight count in the second round of the fight.

=== Williams vs Hall ===
On 23 March 2022, Williams defeated former professional Australian rules footballer Barry Hall at the International Convention Centre in Sydney via TKO in the first round.

=== Williams vs Hunt ===
Williams suffered the first defeat of his professional career, losing via TKO to Mark Hunt in the fourth round of an eight-round heavyweight bout on 5 November 2022, at Ken Rosewall Arena in Sydney, Australia.

=== Williams vs Gallen ===
Williams lost to former NRL player Paul Gallen on 16 July 2025 via split decision, taking his professional record to 9–2.

== Professional boxing record ==
11 fights	9 wins	2 losses
By knockout	4	1
By decision	5	1

No.	Result	Record	Opponent	Type	Round, time	Date	Location	Notes
11	Loss	9–2	Paul Gallen	SD	8 (8),	16 July 2025	Qudos Bank Arena, Sydney, Australia	
10	Loss	9–1	Mark Hunt	TKO	4 (8),	5 Nov 2022	International Convention Centre, Sydney, Australia	
9	Win	9–0	Barry Hall	TKO	1 (8), 1:55	23 Mar 2022	International Convention Centre, Sydney, Australia	
8	Win	8–0	Waikato Falefehi	UD	6	26 Jun 2021	Entertainment and Convention Centre, Townsville, Australia	
7	Win	7–0	Chauncy Welliver	UD	8	31 Jan 2015	Allphones Arena, Sydney, Australia	
6	Win	6–0	Francois Botha	UD	10	8 Feb 2013	Entertainment Centre, Brisbane, Australia	Won vacant WBA International heavyweight title
5	Win	5–0	Clarence Tillman	TKO	1 (10), 2:58	8 Feb 2012	Claudelands Arena, Hamilton, New Zealand	Won vacant NZPBA heavyweight title
4	Win	4–0	Alipate Liava'a	UD	6	5 Jun 2011	The Trusts Arena, Auckland, New Zealand	
3	Win	3–0	Scott Lewis	UD	6	29 Jan 2011	Convention and Exhibition Centre, Gold Coast, Australia	
2	Win	2–0	Ryan Hogan	TKO	1 (4), 2:35	30 Jun 2010	Entertainment Centre, Brisbane, Australia	
1	Win	1–0	Gary Gurr	TKO	2 (4), 1:22	27 May 2009	Entertainment Centre, Brisbane, Australia	

== Endorsements ==
On 5 May 2014, Williams became a global ambassador for sportswear manufacturer Adidas—becoming the first player in rugby league history to be signed on such a deal. He is also the face of clothing label Just Jeans and a brand ambassador for BMW. He has also had endorsement deals with other brands, including Powerade and Rebel Sport. He was ranked 41st in SportsPro magazine's 50 most marketable athletes for 2014.

In December 2015, Williams served as an ambassador for UNICEF, visiting Lebanon with Mike McRoberts in an effort to raise awareness of the plight of Syrian refugee children.

== Personal life ==
Williams's younger sister, Niall, is a New Zealand former international touch football captain and current New Zealand rugby sevens player. His older brother John Arthur Williams has played rugby league in both the New South Wales Cup and Queensland Cup, as well as for the Phelan Shield premiers, the New Lynn Stags, in the 2011 Auckland Rugby League season. Williams is the cousin of brothers Henry and Marcus Perenara, who are former professional rugby league players. He is also the cousin of rugby player and Chiefs teammate Tim Nanai-Williams and Cardiff Blues player Nick Williams. Williams is also distantly related to current All Blacks player TJ Perenara. Williams is often referred to as "SBW".

Williams converted to Islam in 2009, while in France playing for Toulon. He is the first Muslim to play for the All Blacks and has spoken extensively about his faith. In 2018, he performed an Umrah pilgrimage to Mecca, and travelled to Medina as well. He is a dual citizen of New Zealand and Samoa. In 2019, he made a "tearful message of condolence" for the victims of the Christchurch mosque shootings and denounced the treatment of the Uyghurs in China: "It's a sad time when we choose economic benefits over humanity." Williams is married to Alana Raffie, a South African former model, and has five children.

In February 2023, Williams was criticized for endorsing a post by anti-transgender activist Anastasia Maria Loupis that praised a woman for not undergoing a gender transition. Williams subsequently deleted his tweet.

== Statistics ==
=== NRL ===
Season	Team	Matches	Tries	Points
2004	Canterbury-Bankstown Bulldogs	15	4	16
2005	Canterbury-Bankstown Bulldogs	5	1	4
2006	Canterbury-Bankstown Bulldogs	21	8	32
2007	Canterbury-Bankstown Bulldogs	21	14	56
2008	Canterbury-Bankstown Bulldogs	11	4	16
2013	Sydney Roosters	24	8	32
2014	Sydney Roosters	21	3	12
2020	Sydney Roosters	5		
Total		123	42	168

=== All Blacks ===
Against	Pld	W	D	L	Tri	Con	Pen	DG	Pts	%Won
Argentina	6	6	0	0	0	0	0	0	0	100
Australia	10	8	0	2	2	0	0	0	10	80
British and Irish Lions	2	1	0	1	0	0	0	0	5	50
Canada	1	1	0	0	2	0	0	0	5	100
England	3	3	0	0	0	0	0	0	0	100
France	5	5	0	0	1	0	0	0	5	100
Georgia	1	1	0	0	0	0	0	0	0	100
Ireland	4	4	0	0	2	0	0	0	10	100
Namibia	1	1	0	0	0	0	0	0	0	100
Japan	1	1	0	0	2	0	0	0	10	100
Samoa	2	2	0	0	1	0	0	0	5	100
Scotland	3	3	0	0	0	0	0	0	0	100
South Africa	7	5	1	1	0	0	0	0	0	71.43
Tonga	2	2	0	0	1	0	0	0	10	100
United States	1	1	0	0	2	0	0	0	15	100
Wales	3	3	0	0	0	0	0	0	0	100
Total	53	48	1	4	13	0	0	0	75	90.57

Pld = Games Played, W = Games Won, D = Games Drawn, L = Games Lost, Tri = Tries Scored, Con = Conversions, Pen = Penalties, DG = Drop Goals, Pts = Points Scored

- Updated as of 15 September 2019

== Honours ==
=== Individual ===
- 2004: International Newcomer of the Year
- 2004: World XIII
- 2004: Samoan Sports Association Junior Sportsman of the Year
- 2005: Nickelodeon Australian Kids' Choice Awards "Fave Rising Star"
- 2012: New Zealand Professional Boxing Association (NZPBA) Heavyweight Champion
- 2012: Chiefs players' player award
- 2013: WBA International Heavyweight Champion
- 2013: Jack Gibson Medalist – Sydney Roosters' Player of the Year
- 2013: No.9 in AskMen's Top 49 Most Influential Men (2013 edition)
- 2013: RLIF International Second-rower of the Year
- 2013: RLIF International Player of the Year
- 2015: Panathlon International Fair Play Award

=== Team ===
- 2004: NRL Premiership with the Bulldogs
- 2010: Ranfurly Shield winner with Canterbury
- 2010: ITM Cup winner with Canterbury
- 2011: Bledisloe Cup winner with New Zealand
- 2011: Rugby World Cup winner with New Zealand
- 2012: Super Rugby winner with the Chiefs
- 2012: Bledisloe Cup winner with New Zealand
- 2013: Minor Premiership with the Sydney Roosters
- 2013: NRL Premiership with the Sydney Roosters
- 2014: World Club Challenge winner with the Sydney Roosters
- 2014: Minor Premiership with the Sydney Roosters
- 2015: Bulldogs Team of the Decade (2005–2014) – as a back-rower
- 2015: Rugby World Cup winner with New Zealand
- 2016: Wellington Sevens Champion with New Zealand
- 2016: Sydney Sevens Champion with New Zealand
- 2017: Won British & Irish Lions tour game with the Blues
- 2017: Drawn British & Irish Lions Test series with New Zealand
- 2017: Won Bledisloe Cup and the Rugby Championship with New Zealand
- 2017: Won Dave Gallaher Trophy with New Zealand
- 2019: Won Freedom Cup with New Zealand
- 2019: Won Bledisloe Cup with New Zealand
- 2019: Third-place with New Zealand in the Rugby World Cup

== See also ==
- List of players who have converted from one football code to another
- Sonny Wool
