= TJ Perenara =

New Zealand international rugby union footballer

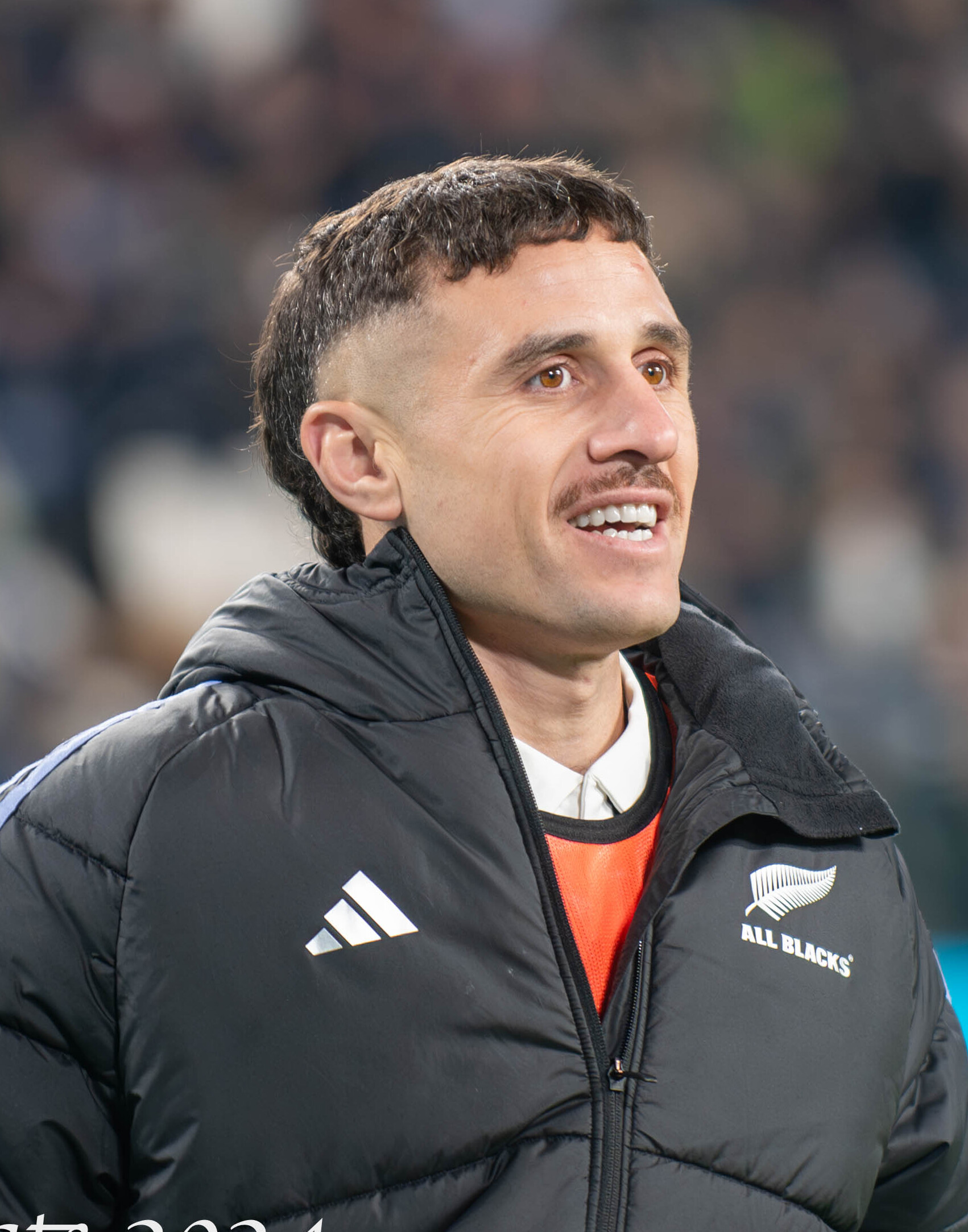
- Perenara with New Zealand in 2024
- Full name: Thomas Tekanapu Rawakata Perenara
- Born: 23 January 1992 (age 34) Porirua, New Zealand
- Height: 184 cm (6 ft 0 in)
- Weight: 91 kg (201 lb; 14 st 5 lb)
- School: Mana College
- Notable relatives: Tim Nanai-Williams (cousin); Henry Perenara (cousin); Marcus Perenara (cousin); Sonny Bill Williams (cousin)

Rugby union career
- Position(s): Half-back, First five-eighth
- Current team: Black Rams Tokyo
Senior career
Years	Team	Apps	(Points)
2010–2024	Wellington	32	(35)
2012–2024	Hurricanes	163	(327)
2021	Red Hurricanes Osaka	9	(35)
2024–	Black Rams Tokyo	37	(65)
- Correct as of 11 June 2025
International career
Years	Team	Apps	(Points)
2011	New Zealand U20	5	(15)
2014–2024	New Zealand	89	(80)
2020	North Island	1	(0)
2022	Māori All Blacks	2	(0)
2022	All Blacks XV	1	(0)
- Correct as of 11 June 2025
Medal record
Men's Rugby union
Representing New Zealand
Rugby World Cup
Gold medal – first place	2015 England	Squad
Bronze medal – third place	2019 Japan	Squad

Thomas Tekanapu Rawakata Perenara (born 23 January 1992), commonly known as TJ Perenara, is a New Zealand rugby union player who plays as a half-back for the Black Rams Tokyo in the Japan Rugby League One. He has previously played for the Hurricanes in Super Rugby and Wellington in the Bunnings NPC. Perenara is the most capped Hurricane of all time with 163 caps. Perenara made his international debut for New Zealand in 2014 and played in 89 test matches until the end of his All Black career in 2024.

== Early life and family ==
Perenara was born in Porirua, New Zealand, and grew up in the suburb of Titahi Bay. He has two older sisters, Jessica Paul (eldest), and Eden Perenara. His father, Thomas (whose father hails from Matatā), played for the Junior Kiwis in 1987 and in the New Zealand Softball Team (Black Sox) from 1987 to 1996. His mother Fiona (Farrow) played softball for New Zealand as did his grandmother Patricia Farrow and his uncle Jason Farrow. Perenara's paternal grandmother was born in Broken Hill, Australia. Two of his cousins, Henry and Marcus, played in the National Rugby League competition. He is also distantly related to All Black teammate, Sonny Bill Williams, as well as Samoan international rugby player, Tim Nanai-Williams. He is of Te Arawa and Ngāti Rangitihi descent.

== Career ==
=== Early career ===
Perenara scored a hat trick of tries on his Super Rugby debut in a 46–19 victory against the Western Force in Perth on 10 March 2012. Perenara quickly became a regular starter for the team.

He was selected for the All Blacks squad for the 2013 Rugby Championship but was not capped that year.

After finishing the 2014 Super Rugby season with five tries, he made his All Blacks debut in the first test against England in 2014, along with centre Malakai Fekitoa. Perenara scored his first test try for the All Blacks in a 34–13 win against Argentina that year after replacing Aaron Smith off the bench. Perenara then went on to start for the first time in his international career against the United States, only being replaced with nine minutes to go. Perenara played in all three remaining tests on the end of year tour, including a start against Scotland.

=== 2015–2016 ===
Perenara scored the second to most tries of any player in the 2015 Super Rugby season behind Highlanders winger Waisake Naholo, scoring eleven tries for the Hurricanes that season. Following the end of the Super Rugby season, Perenara started against Argentina for the All Blacks. He was named in New Zealand's ultimately victorious 2015 Rugby World Cup squad, playing in two matches, including a start against Namibia.

Perenara was named vice captain of the Hurricanes following Conrad Smith's departure to Pau. Perenara captained the Hurricanes multiple times in 2016 due to injuries to regular captain Dane Coles, including the semifinal against the Chiefs. Perenara was also named man of the match against the Sharks in the quarterfinal, where he scored a try in the 41–0 victory, the first time in Super Rugby history that a losing team did not score any points in a knockout round.

Perenara was initially left out of New Zealand's All Blacks squad in 2016, but was called up as injury cover for Tawera Kerr-Barlow. Perenara and Kerr-Barlow were both kept in the squad for the Rugby Championship, the All Blacks deciding to have three halfbacks in the squad. During the competition, Aaron Smith began to decrease in form quality after having multiple off field incidents. Perenara earned a start against Argentina in the championship, keeping the starting spot over Kerr-Barlow for the rest of the competition. He scored 4 tries during the competition, including two tries against South Africa and what was later nominated for Try of The Year against Argentina. Perenara was used as New Zealand's Haka leader since Smith's off field incidents.

Towards the end of 2016 Perenara was established as New Zealand's first choice halfback, upon Aaron Smith's decline in performance after his return to the international field. Perenara ended 2016 as one of the team's top try scorers after scoring his fifth of the year in the historic 40–29 loss to Ireland in Chicago.

=== 2017 ===
After captaining the Hurricanes to an 83–17 win over the Sunwolves to open their season, Perenara took over as captain of the team and led the team in every single match of the year except for four. This happened after Dane Coles was badly concussed in round three against the Chiefs. Coles did not return to action until the knockout rounds. Coles relieved Perenara of captaincy in the semifinal. Perenara scored the opening try of the semifinal in Johannesburg, but the Hurricanes suffered a 29–44 loss to the Lions in the match.

Perenara became the highest try scorer of all halfbacks in Super Rugby history in 2017 where he scored his 44th try and seventh of the 2017 season in the semifinal loss to the Lions in Johannesburg. Perenara scored his first try of the 2018 Super Rugby campaign against the Crusaders to score his 45th try.

Despite an outstanding Super Rugby campaign, Perenara went back to being the second choice halfback with Aaron Smith returning to better form. This was made clear in the 2017 Pasifika Challenge against Samoa where Perenara replaced Smith in the 56th minute of the 78–0 win, scoring a try in the 71st minute. Smith started as halfback in all three tests against the British & Irish Lions in 2017, with Perenara coming off the bench as a reserve in those three matches. Perenara lead the Haka in every single test against the Lions. He carried a heavy workload for the All Blacks in 2017, playing in 14 matches that year and leading the haka in all of those, including starts against Argentina which was a 39–22 win and the Barbarians in a 31–22 win, scoring a try against the Barbarians in that fixture, that was not a capped fixture. Perenara only missed one test that year, which was the last 2017 Rugby Championship fixture, against South Africa.

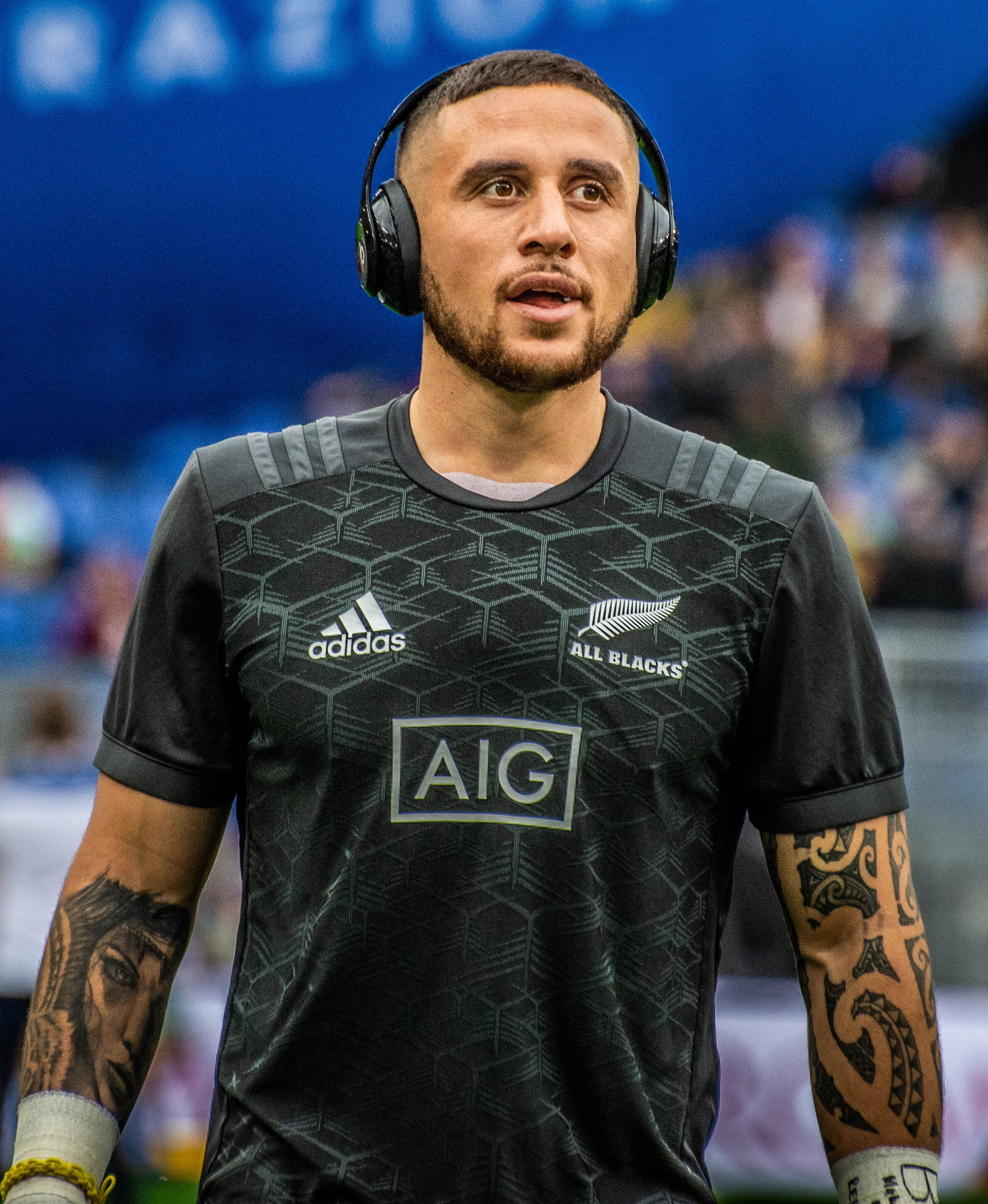
Perenara in 2018.

=== 2018 ===
Perenara was expected to take over as Hurricanes captain for 2018, with Dane Coles ruled out for the season, due to a torn ACL, sustained against France in 2017. Perenara remained as vice captain, however, with the departing flanker Brad Shields named as captain for his last season with the Hurricanes, instead of Perenara or Coles as captain.

He struggled with injury early in the year, but still scored six tries during the 2018 Super Rugby season. Perenara's most notable contribution to the Hurricanes in 2018 was his Man of the Match performance against the Chiefs in the quarterfinal, scoring two tries and performing a try saving tackle on Chiefs flanker Lachlan Boshier.

Perenara was again selected for the All Blacks in 2018, but received the first yellow card of his international career during the 2018 Steinlager series, against France. His second half yellow card came in the 63rd minute of the second test, for an offside, during the controversial 26–13 victory, which also saw France's Benjamin Fall red carded.

After 8 consecutive appearances off the bench, since 2017, Perenara was selected to start for the All Blacks against Argentina, on 8 September 2018, during the 2018 Rugby Championship. Perenara had an outstanding 71 minute performance that included two tries and solid defence, bringing his international try tally to 10 tries from 48 tests. Perenara was subbed off for All Black debutant and former Hurricanes teammate Te Toiroa Tahuriorangi, with the All Blacks beating Argentina 46–24. Perenara was named Man of the Match, although his performance was not perfect, as he missed a tackle on Ramiro Moyano, leading to Argentina scoring the opening try. The following week of the Rugby Championship saw Perenara replace Aaron Smith off the bench, in the 49th minute, in a test against South Africa, after a poor performance from Smith. Perenara performed far better than Smith, but failed to assist his country manage a victory. A mostly one sided first half saw New Zealand lose to South Africa, 34–36, in an unexpected loss.

On 29 September 2018, Perenara played his 50th test for New Zealand, only four years after his international debut. The fixture saw Perenara play for 66 minutes until being replaced by Aaron Smith, the All Black debut of Angus Ta'avao and their third consecutive win of the Rugby Championship competition. The All Blacks won the test, 35–17. Perenara only played in the last 10 minutes during the following test, the last Rugby Championship test, which was a narrow 32–30 win over South Africa.

Aaron Smith's fading form saw Perenara begin his 2018 end-of-year tour with a start in the third Bledisloe Cup test, against Australia, in a 37–20 win. After key members of the All Blacks, including the likes of Perenara and Captain Kieran Read, missed the test against Japan, Perenara was named on the bench prior to the 10 November test against England. Perenara performed poorly against England and could potentially have cost New Zealand a win, with England replacement forward, Courtney Lawes, charging down a box kick from Perenara to set Sam Underhill up, for what could have been England's winning try. The try was not given to England by the referee however, as Lawes was deemed to be offside. New Zealand narrowly won against England, 16–15. Perenara was subsequently benched for the 17 November loss to Ireland, which was a 9–16 against New Zealand. After the big games against England and Ireland, Perenara finished the season off with a start against Italy. He scored the opening try against Italy off a pass from winger, Jordie Barrett, before being replaced by Te Toiroa Tahuriorangi, in the 51st minute of the test, which ended the season in a 66–3 victory.

=== 2019 ===
Starting the season alongside club captain Dane Coles, Perenara had to assume the captaincy when Coles was injured. Under his leadership, the Hurricanes suffered a loss to the Crusaders and a draw with the Chiefs, which was further fractionalized by a second loss to the Crusaders at home on 29 March. From Round 8 on, the Hurricanes enjoyed an unbroken run of victories until Round 14, when the Jaguares South American side defeated them for the first time ever, 20–28 in Wellington. Perenara was rejoined by Dane Coles for the sides tour of South Africa, where two wins boosted the side's chances, as they would end the regular season with a 29–24 win over the Blues that earned a home quarterfinal game against the Bulls. His side won that game 35–28, but it would see the Hurricanes face the Crusaders in the Super Rugby semifinals. Losing that game 30–26 in Christchurch, Perenara would demonstrate that a late interference by Sam Whitelock would influence his team ending the 'Canes 2019 season run. Perenara was widely regarded as the Hurricanes' Most Valuable Player of the 2019 Super Rugby season.

Perenara played nine tests for New Zealand in 2019, including five at the 2019 Rugby World Cup, where the All Blacks finished in third place. He was awarded the IRP Try of the Year in 2019, finishing a well executed team try, during New Zealand's 71-9 Pool Stage win over Namibia.

=== Leading of the haka ===
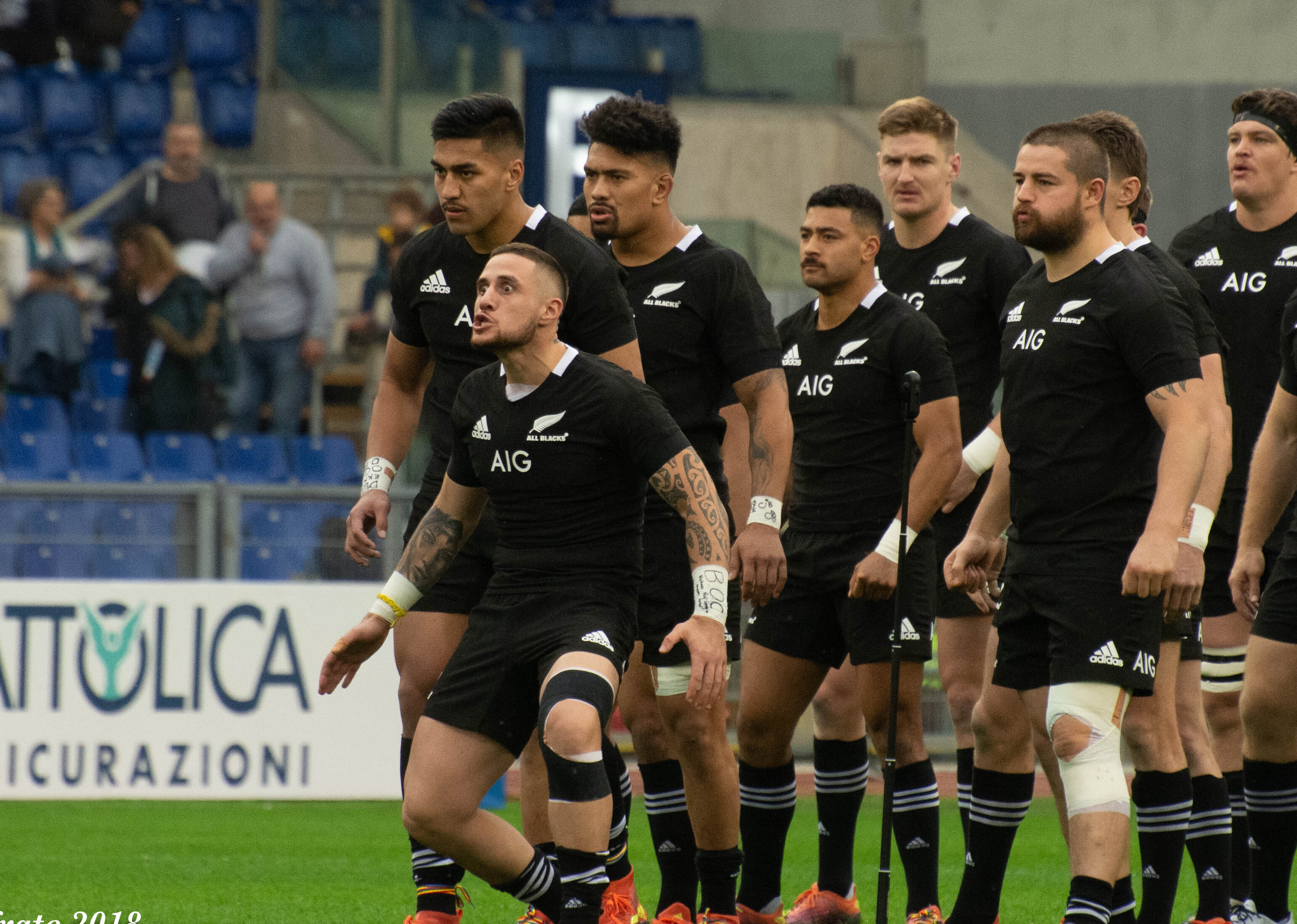
Perenara leading the Haka in 2018.

Of the 87 tests he played in Perenara was the haka leader in 58 of them; this is the most for any player since the introduction of Kapa o Pango in 2005 and surpassed that of Piri Weepu in the test versus England in Dunedin 2024 when Perenara had led the haka 52 times. By the end of his All Blacks career 28 times he had led the Ka Mate version of the haka and 30 times the newer Kapa o Pango haka.

== Personal life ==
Perenara is known for his support of social issues, having spoken widely of his support for inclusiveness and diversity in rugby. In response to Israel Folau's controversial comments on same-sex marriage, Perenara tweeted in support of the rainbow community. He has expressed continued support for LGBT issues. In 2024, he gave public support to the women's Hurricanes side, the Poua, which performed pre match haka that were critical of the National-led coalition government.

Perenara has followed a vegan diet since November 2019, after being a vegetarian for two years. Talking about his first switch to a vegetarian diet, he said: "I ate meat until about two years ago. I started on the India tour-- I was massive on the environment, pollution, stuff like that. And then I watched the documentary called Cowspiracy. It talked about how much agricultural farming accounts for pollution in the world and I was like man, I can't really say I care about it if I eat meat. My journey is to become vegan, so that's what I'll get to."

In early 2020, Perenara and his wife Greer announced they were expecting their first child.
