= Niall Guthrie =

Samoa international rugby league & NZ rugby union player

Niall Williams-Guthrie
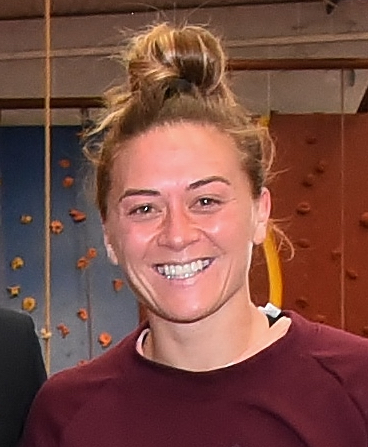
- Williams in 2017
- Born: Niall Williams; 21 April 1988 (age 38)
- Height: 1.74 m (5 ft 9 in)
- Weight: 74 kg (11 st 9 lb)
- Notable relative(s): Sonny Bill Williams (brother); Henry Perenara (cousin); Marcus Perenara (cousin)

Rugby union career
- Position: Centre or Forward
Super Rugby
Years	Team	Apps	(Points)
2024	Blues Women	5	(5)
National sevens team
Years	Team		Comps
2015–23	New Zealand		164
- Rugby league career

Playing information
- Position: Centre, Second-row
Club
Years	Team	Pld	T	G	FG	P
2023–25	Gold Coast Titans	17	2	0	0	4
Representative
Years	Team	Pld	T	G	FG	P
2023	Samoa	1	0	0	0	0
Medal record
Women's rugby sevens
Representing New Zealand
Olympic Games
Silver medal – second place	2016 Rio de Janeiro	Team competition
Commonwealth Games
Gold medal – first place	2018 Gold Coast	Team competition
Bronze medal – third place	2022 Birmingham	Team competition
Rugby World Cup Sevens
Gold medal – first place	2018 San Francisco	Team competition
Silver medal – second place	2022 Cape Town	Team competition

Niall Williams-Guthrie (née Williams; born 21 April 1988) is a New Zealand rugby league player. She has represented New Zealand in rugby sevens and touch rugby at an international level. She has won silver medals as part of New Zealand's touch football team in 2011, and in the 2016 Rio Olympics as a member of New Zealand's sevens team. She also won gold medals in sevens in the 2018 Commonwealth Games, and 2018 Rugby World Cup Sevens.

== Early life ==
Williams was born on 21 April 1988, in Auckland, New Zealand, to Samoan father, Ioane ("John") Williams and mother, Lee Woolsey who is a Pākehā New Zealander of English descent whose mother (Williams' maternal grandmother) was from Australia. She has two older brothers, John Arthur, Sonny Bill and a twin sister, Denise. When she was young her parents separated, with her, her sister and John Arthur staying with their mother, while Sonny Bill lived with her father. Her brother Sonny Bill Williams went on to have a successful career in rugby league and rugby union where he played for the All Blacks. Her cousin Tim Nanai-Williams has represented Samoa in both Rugby Sevens and the fifteen-man game.

Williams grew up in a working-class family in a state house in the Auckland suburb of Mount Albert.

== Rugby career ==
=== Touch ===
In touch football she won gold at the 2005 Youth World Cup and silver at the 2011 Touch Football World Cup.

=== Rugby Sevens ===
Guthrie made her international debut for New Zealand at Dubai on 3 December 2015.

==== 2016 Rio Olympics ====
She was a member of the New Zealand sevens team that competed in the 2016 Summer Olympics, where they claimed the silver medal behind Australia.

==== 2018 Gold Coast Commonwealth Games ====
She was a member of New Zealand’s team that competed in the 2018 Gold Coast Commonwealth Games.

In the team’s opening match at Robina Stadium against Kenya on 13 April 2018, Williams scored two tries. The first occurred when she chased down a kicked ball as a Kenyan player attempted to shepherd it out over the dead-ball line only to see Williams dive full length past her to put it down just short of the dead ball line. Three minutes later she scored her second try. In the final against Australia with score locked 12-12 at full time, Willams in extra-time chased down and made a try-saving tackle on Evania Pelite, winning the penalty at the breakdown which handed New Zealand possession from which Kelly Brazier ultimately scored the match-winning try.

==== Injury ====
Guthrie missed the Tokyo Olympics in 2021 due to a neck injury. She was named in the Black Ferns Sevens squad for the 2022 Commonwealth Games in Birmingham. She won a bronze medal at the event. She also won a silver medal at the Rugby World Cup Sevens in Cape Town.

Guthrie served in the New Zealand team that won the 2022–23 World Rugby Women's Sevens Series. She played her final game for the sevens team at the final tournament of the series, which was the 2023 France Women's Sevens held in Toulouse on 12–14 May 2023.

=== Super Rugby Aupiki ===
Guthrie signed with the Blues Women for the 2024 Super Rugby Aupiki season.

=== Rugby League ===
In 2023, Guthrie signed a two-year deal with the Gold Coast Titans in the NRLW. She is also part of the Samoa squad taking part in the 2023 Pacific Rugby League Championships.

== Personal life ==
Of Samoan and European descent, she is also known as "Nizzle",

At Paengaroa in December 2022 long after she had first accepted his marriage proposal back in 2016 she finally married her long-time partner Tamāli’i “Tama” Guthrie. They had first met when they played touch rugby together but it wasn’t until she was training him to be a postman while both were working at NZ Post that a romantic connection began to form. The couple have two children, Tatum-Lee and Rema-Rae.
