= Marcus Perenara =

New Zealand rugby league footballer

Personal information
- Born: 1 November 1985 (age 41) Auckland, New Zealand
- Height: 1.80 m (5 ft 11 in)
- Weight: 96 kg (15 st 2 lb)

Playing information
- Position: Halfback
Club
Years	Team	Pld	T	G	FG	P
2006	Parramatta Eels	1	0	0	0	0
- Source: RLP
- Relatives: Henry Perenara (brother); Sonny Bill Williams (cousin); Niall Guthrie (cousin); TJ Perenara (cousin)

Marcus Perenara is a New Zealand rugby league player who played professionally for the Parramatta Eels.

He is the brother of Henry Perenara and the cousin of current All Blacks (rugby union) TJ Perenara and Sonny Bill Williams.

== Playing career ==
Perenara, a Bay Roskill Vikings junior, played for the Marist-Richmond Brothers in the Bartercard Cup between 2002 and 2004. He was a Schoolboy Kiwi in 2000. He led the Brothers to the 2004 Bartercard Cup Grand Final before they lost 20–40 to Mount Albert.

He was signed by the Parramatta Eels in 2005 and played one National Rugby League game for the club in 2006, coming off the bench. In 2006 he scored 5 tries and 4 field goals for 23 points for the Eels in the NSWRL Premier League. His last match for the club was the 2006 NSWRL Premier League grand final, where he scored the winning field goal.
