= 2014 NRL season results =

The 2014 NRL season consisted of 26 weekly regular season rounds starting on Thursday March 6, and concluded on Sunday October 5 with the grand final, where the South Sydney Rabbitohs ended a 43-year premiership drought by defeating the Canterbury-Bankstown Bulldogs 30–6.

== Regular season ==
=== Round 1 ===
Home	Score	Away	Match information
Home	Score	Away	Date and time (Local)	Venue	Referees	Attendance
South Sydney Rabbitohs	28-8	Sydney Roosters	6 March 2014, 8:05 pm	ANZ Stadium, Sydney	Ben Cummins; Luke Phillips	27,282
Canterbury-Bankstown Bulldogs	12-18	Brisbane Broncos	7 March 2014, 8:05 pm	ANZ Stadium, Sydney	Shayne Hayne; Chris James	18,040
Penrith Panthers	30-8	Newcastle Knights	8 March 2014, 4:30 pm	Sportingbet Stadium	Matt Cecchin; Alan Shortall	11,369
Manly-Warringah Sea Eagles	22-23	Melbourne Storm	8 March 2014, 7:00 pm	Brookvale Oval	Gerard Sutton; Gavin Reynolds	14,200
North Queensland Cowboys	28-22	Canberra Raiders	8 March 2014, 8:00 pm	1300SMILES Stadium	Gavin Badger; Brett Suttor	12,121
St. George Illawarra Dragons	44-24	Wests Tigers	9 March 2014, 3:00 pm	ANZ Stadium, Sydney	Ashley Klein; Adam Gee	19,860
Parramatta Eels	36-16	New Zealand Warriors	9 March 2014, 3:00 pm	Pirtek Stadium	Adam Devcich; Henry Perenara	14,397
Cronulla-Sutherland Sharks	12-18	Gold Coast Titans	10 March 2014, 7:00 pm	Remondis Stadium	Jared Maxwell; Grant Atkins	9,321

- The Melbourne Storm won their season opener for the 10th successive year.

=== Round 2 ===
Home	Score	Away	Match information
Home	Score	Away	Date and time (Local)	Venue	Referees	Attendance
Manly-Warringah Sea Eagles	14-12	South Sydney Rabbitohs	14 March 2014, 7:40 pm	Bluetongue Stadium		15,120
Brisbane Broncos	16-12	North Queensland Cowboys	14 March 2014, 7:40 pm	Suncorp Stadium		43,303
New Zealand Warriors	12 - 31	St. George Illawarra Dragons	15 March 2014, 5:00 pm	Eden Park	Jared Maxwell; Grant Atkins	14,392
Melbourne Storm	18 - 17	Penrith Panthers	15 March 2014, 5:30 pm	AAMI Park		13,952
Sydney Roosters	56 - 4	Parramatta Eels	15 March 2014, 7:30 pm	Allianz Stadium	Brett Suttor; Gavin Badger	13,269
Gold Coast Titans	12 - 42	Wests Tigers	16 March 2014, 2:00 pm	Cbus Super Stadium		12,038
Newcastle Knights	20 - 26	Canberra Raiders	16 March 2014, 6:30 pm	Hunter Stadium		14,674
Canterbury-Bankstown Bulldogs	42 - 4	Cronulla-Sutherland Sharks	17 March 2014, 7:00 pm	ANZ Stadium, Sydney		12,057

=== Round 3 ===
Home	Score	Away	Match information
Home	Score	Away	Date and time (Local)	Venue	Referees	Attendance
Wests Tigers	25 - 16	South Sydney Rabbitohs	21 March 2014, 7:40 pm	ANZ Stadium, Sydney		20,061
Brisbane Broncos	26 - 30	Sydney Roosters	21 March 2014, 7:40 pm	Suncorp Stadium		33,381
Penrith Panthers	18 - 16	Canterbury-Bankstown Bulldogs	22 March 2014, 4:30 pm	Sportingbet Stadium		13,291
Cronulla-Sutherland Sharks	12 - 14	St. George Illawarra Dragons	22 March 2014, 7:00 pm	Remondis Stadium		14,821
North Queensland Cowboys	16 - 20	New Zealand Warriors	22 March 2014, 8:00 pm	1300SMILES Stadium		12,738
Manly-Warringah Sea Eagles	22 - 18	Parramatta Eels	23 March 2014, 3:00 pm	Brookvale Oval	Jared Maxwell; Grant Atkins	14,135
Canberra Raiders	12 - 24	Gold Coast Titans	23 March 2014, 6:30 pm	GIO Stadium		9,636
Melbourne Storm	28 - 20	Newcastle Knights	24 March 2014, 7:00 pm	AAMI Park		11,490

=== Round 4 ===
Home	Score	Away	Match information
Home	Score	Away	Date and time (Local)	Venue	Referees	Attendance
Sydney Roosters	0 - 8	Manly-Warringah Sea Eagles	28 March 2014, 7:40 pm	Allianz Stadium		14,902
St. George Illawarra Dragons	20 - 36	Brisbane Broncos	28 March 2014, 8:00 pm	WIN Stadium		10,526
Parramatta Eels	32 - 16	Penrith Panthers	29 March 2014, 5:30 pm	Pirtek Stadium	Shayne Hayne; Henry Perenara	14,448
Canterbury-Bankstown Bulldogs	40 - 12	Melbourne Storm	29 March 2014, 7:30 pm	nib Stadium		12,014
New Zealand Warriors	42 - 18	Wests Tigers	29 March 2014, 2:00 pm	Westpac Stadium		22,512
South Sydney Rabbitohs	18 - 30	Canberra Raiders	30 March 2014, 2:00 pm	ANZ Stadium, Sydney		16,032
Newcastle Knights	30 - 0	Cronulla-Sutherland Sharks	30 March 2014, 3:00 pm	Hunter Stadium		18,196
Gold Coast Titans	13 - 12	North Queensland Cowboys	31 March 2014, 6:30 pm	Cbus Super Stadium		9,482

=== Round 5 ===
Home	Score	Away	Match information
Home	Score	Away	Date and time (Local)	Venue	Referees	Attendance
Sydney Roosters	8 - 9	Canterbury-Bankstown Bulldogs	4 April 2014, 7:40 pm	Allianz Stadium		12,854
Brisbane Broncos	18 - 25	Parramatta Eels	4 April 2014, 7:40 pm	Suncorp Stadium	Matt Cecchin; Grant Atkins	32,009
Cronulla-Sutherland Sharks	37 - 6	New Zealand Warriors	5 April 2014, 3:00 pm	Remondis Stadium		11,307
Penrith Panthers	12 - 6	Canberra Raiders	5 April 2014, 5:30 pm	Sportingbet Stadium		7,667
St. George Illawarra Dragons	6 - 26	South Sydney Rabbitohs	5 April 2014, 7:30 pm	Sydney Cricket Ground		24,368
Melbourne Storm	26 - 28	Gold Coast Titans	6 April 2014, 2:00 pm	AAMI Park		11,930
Wests Tigers	34 - 18	Manly-Warringah Sea Eagles	6 April 2014, 3:00 pm	Leichhardt Oval		16,311
North Queensland Cowboys	28 - 2	Newcastle Knights	7 April 2014, 7:00 pm	1300SMILES Stadium		11,189

=== Round 6 ===
Home	Score	Away	Match information
Home	Score	Away	Date and time (Local)	Venue	Referees	Attendance
Penrith Panthers	2 - 18	South Sydney Rabbitohs	11 April 2014, 7:40 pm	Sportingbet Stadium		11,764
Gold Coast Titans	12 - 8	Brisbane Broncos	11 April 2014, 7:40 pm	Cbus Super Stadium		20,524
Canberra Raiders	12 - 26	Newcastle Knights	12 April 2014, 3:00 pm	GIO Stadium		9,519
Parramatta Eels	14 - 12	Sydney Roosters	12 April 2014, 5:30 pm	Pirtek Stadium	Gerard Sutton; David Munro	15,312
Wests Tigers	16 - 4	North Queensland Cowboys	12 April 2014, 7:30 pm	Campbelltown Stadium		6,456
New Zealand Warriors	20 - 21	Canterbury-Bankstown Bulldogs	13 April 2014, 4:00 pm	Eden Park		22,165
Manly-Warringah Sea Eagles	24 - 4	Cronulla-Sutherland Sharks	13 April 2014, 3:00 pm	Brookvale Oval		9,065
Melbourne Storm	28 - 24	St. George Illawarra Dragons	14 April 2014, 7:00 pm	AAMI Park		13,130

=== Round 7 ===
Home	Score	Away	Match information
Home	Score	Away	Date and time (Local)	Venue	Referees	Attendance
South Sydney Rabbitohs	14 - 15	Canterbury-Bankstown Bulldogs	18 April 2014, 4:00 pm	ANZ Stadium, Sydney		43,255
Newcastle Knights	6 - 32	Brisbane Broncos	18 April 2014, 7:40 pm	Hunter Stadium		22,278
Manly-Warringah Sea Eagles	26 - 21	North Queensland Cowboys	18 April 2014, 7:40 pm	Bluetongue Stadium		10,012
St. George Illawarra Dragons	20 - 10	New Zealand Warriors	19 April 2014, 5:30 pm	WIN Jubilee Oval		10,801
Cronulla-Sutherland Sharks	18 - 24	Sydney Roosters	19 April 2014, 7:30 pm	Remondis Stadium		12,100
Canberra Raiders	24 - 22	Melbourne Storm	20 April 2014, 3:00 pm	GIO Stadium		10,941
Parramatta Eels	18 - 21	Wests Tigers	21 April 2014, 4:00 pm	ANZ Stadium, Sydney	Matt Cecchin; Grant Atkins	50,688
Penrith Panthers	14 - 12	Gold Coast Titans	21 April 2014, 7:00 pm	Sportingbet Stadium		9,555

- The Bulldogs became the first team in History to win 3 straight games by 1 point.

=== Round 8 ===
Home	Score	Away	Match information
Home	Score	Away	Date and time (Local)	Venue	Referees	Attendance
St. George Illawarra Dragons	14 - 34	Sydney Roosters	25 April 2014, 4:00 pm	Allianz Stadium		38,784
Melbourne Storm	10 - 16	New Zealand Warriors	25 April 2014, 6:00 pm	AAMI Park		28,716
Brisbane Broncos	26 - 28	South Sydney Rabbitohs	25 April 2014, 8:00 pm	Suncorp Stadium		44,122
Cronulla-Sutherland Sharks	24 - 20	Penrith Panthers	26 April 2014, 3:00 pm	Remondis Stadium		13,669
North Queensland Cowboys	42 - 14	Parramatta Eels	26 April 2014, 5:30 pm	1300SMILES Stadium	Ben Cummings; Gavin Reynolds	13,285
Canterbury-Bankstown Bulldogs	16 - 12	Newcastle Knights	26 April 2014, 7:30 pm	ANZ Stadium, Sydney		15,286
Manly-Warringah Sea Eagles	54 - 18	Canberra Raiders	27 April 2014, 2:00 pm	Brookvale Oval		8,817
Wests Tigers	6 - 22	Gold Coast Titans	27 April 2014, 3:00 pm	Leichhardt Oval		8,929

=== Round 9 ===
Home	Score	Away	Match information
Home	Score	Away	Date and time (Local)	Venue	Referees	Attendance
Sydney Roosters	30 - 6	Wests Tigers	9 May 2014, 7:40 pm	Allianz Stadium		16,024
North Queensland Cowboys	27 - 14	Brisbane Broncos	9 May 2014, 7:40 pm	1300SMILES Stadium		21,340
New Zealand Warriors	54 - 12	Canberra Raiders	10 May 2014, 5:00 pm	Eden Park		18,165
Gold Coast Titans	18 - 40	South Sydney Rabbitohs	10 May 2014, 5:30 pm	Cbus Super Stadium		19,107
Melbourne Storm	22 - 19	Manly-Warringah Sea Eagles	10 May 2014, 7:30 pm	AAMI Park		13,273
Newcastle Knights	10 - 32	Penrith Panthers	11 May 2014, 2:00 pm	Hunter Stadium		13,682
St. George Illawarra Dragons	6 - 38	Canterbury-Bankstown Bulldogs	11 May 2014, 3:00 pm	ANZ Stadium, Sydney		21,077
Parramatta Eels	42 - 24	Cronulla-Sutherland Sharks	12 May 2014, 7:00 pm	Pirtek Stadium	Adam Devcich; Alan Shortall	12,541

- The Raiders became the first team since North Queensland in Rounds 13 and 14 2007 to concede 50+ points in consecutive games, it was also the 2nd time in Raiders History this had happened, having happened in Rounds 2 and 3 2006.

=== Round 10 ===
Home	Score	Away	Match information
Home	Score	Away	Date and time (Local)	Venue	Referees	Attendance
South Sydney Rabbitohs	14 - 27	Melbourne Storm	16 May 2014, 7:40 pm	ANZ Stadium, Sydney		18,508
Brisbane Broncos	22 - 8	Gold Coast Titans	16 May 2014, 7:40 pm	Suncorp Stadium		31,380
Parramatta Eels	36 - 0	St. George Illawarra Dragons	17 May 2014, 3:00 pm	Pirtek Stadium	Jared Maxwell; Chris James	18,631
Cronulla-Sutherland Sharks	20 - 22	Wests Tigers	17 May 2014, 5:30 pm	Remondis Stadium		15,869
North Queensland Cowboys	42 - 10	Sydney Roosters	17 May 2014, 7:30 pm	1300SMILES Stadium		15,361
Canberra Raiders	20 - 26	Penrith Panthers	18 May 2014, 2:00 pm	GIO Stadium		8,892
Canterbury-Bankstown Bulldogs	16 - 12	New Zealand Warriors	18 May 2014, 4:00 pm	Waikato Stadium		17,673
Manly-Warringah Sea Eagles	15 - 14	Newcastle Knights	19 May 2014, 7:00 pm	Brookvale Oval		8,655

=== Round 11 ===
Home	Score	Away	Match information
Home	Score	Away	Date and time (Local)	Venue	Referees	Attendance
Canterbury-Bankstown Bulldogs	12 - 32	Sydney Roosters	23 May 2014, 7:45 pm	ANZ Stadium, Sydney		19,088
Gold Coast Titans	16 - 24	New Zealand Warriors	24 May 2014, 5:30 pm	Cbus Super Stadium		18,753
Wests Tigers	14 - 16	Brisbane Broncos	24 May 2014, 7:30 pm	Campbelltown Stadium		16,511
Canberra Raiders	42 - 12	North Queensland Cowboys	25 May 2014, 3:00 pm	GIO Stadium		8,412
Cronulla-Sutherland Sharks	0 - 18	South Sydney Rabbitohs	26 May 2014, 7:00 pm	Remondis Stadium		8,137
Bye: St. George Illawarra Dragons, Parramatta Eels, Newcastle Knights, Penrith Panthers, Manly-Warringah Sea Eagles & Melbourne Storm

- South Sydney held an opposition team to nil for the first time since Round 18 1999, and the first time since re-admission in 2002.

=== Round 12 ===
Home	Score	Away	Match information
Home	Score	Away	Date and time (Local)	Venue	Referees	Attendance
Penrith Panthers	38 - 12	Parramatta Eels	30 May 2014, 7:45 pm	Sportingbet Stadium	Matt Cecchin; Gavin Morris	19,141
Sydney Roosters	26 - 12	Canberra Raiders	31 May 2014, 5:30 pm	Allianz Stadium		11,815
North Queensland Cowboys	22 - 0	Melbourne Storm	31 May 2014, 7:30 pm	1300SMILES Stadium		12,392
New Zealand Warriors	38 - 18	Newcastle Knights	1 June 2014, 4:00 pm	Mt Smart Stadium		19,068
Brisbane Broncos	36 - 10	Manly-Warringah Sea Eagles	1 June 2014, 3:00 pm	Suncorp Stadium		32,017
South Sydney Rabbitohs	29 - 10	St. George Illawarra Dragons	2 June 2014, 7:00 pm	ANZ Stadium, Sydney		11,771
Bye: Canterbury-Bankstown Bulldogs, Cronulla-Sutherland Sharks, Wests Tigers & Gold Coast Titans

=== Round 13 ===
Home	Score	Away	Match information
Home	Score	Away	Date and time (Local)	Venue	Referees	Attendance
Manly-Warringah Sea Eagles	32 - 10	Canterbury-Bankstown Bulldogs	6 June 2014, 7:40 pm	Brookvale Oval		9,235
Parramatta Eels	18 - 16	North Queensland Cowboys	6 June 2014, 7:40 pm	Pirtek Stadium	Ben Cummings; Gavin Reynolds	10,142
Gold Coast Titans	14 - 36	Penrith Panthers	7 June 2014, 5:30 pm	Cbus Super Stadium		10,507
St. George Illawarra Dragons	30 - 0	Cronulla-Sutherland Sharks	7 June 2014, 7:30 pm	WIN Stadium		12,079
South Sydney Rabbitohs	34 - 18	New Zealand Warriors	7 June 2014, 7:30 pm	nib Stadium		20,267
Newcastle Knights	20 - 23	Wests Tigers	8 June 2014, 2:00 pm	Hunter Stadium		22,173
Melbourne Storm	12 - 32	Sydney Roosters	8 June 2014, 3:00 pm	AAMI Park		16,757
Canberra Raiders	4 - 28	Brisbane Broncos	9 June 2014, 7:00 pm	GIO Stadium		8,094

=== Round 14 ===
Home	Score	Away	Match information
Home	Score	Away	Date and time (Local)	Venue	Referees	Attendance
South Sydney Rabbitohs	32 - 10	Wests Tigers	13 June 2014, 7:45 pm	ANZ Stadium, Sydney		20,721
Penrith Panthers	18 - 14	St. George Illawarra Dragons	14 June 2014, 5:30 pm	Sportingbet Stadium		13,768
Sydney Roosters	29 - 12	Newcastle Knights	14 June 2014, 7:30 pm	Allianz Stadium		9,847
Canterbury-Bankstown Bulldogs	12 - 22	Parramatta Eels	15 June 2014, 3:00 pm	ANZ Stadium, Sydney	Matt Cecchin; Henry Perenara	24,012
Gold Coast Titans	20 - 24	Melbourne Storm	16 June 2014, 7:00 pm	Cbus Super Stadium		6,497
Bye: Brisbane Broncos, North Queensland Cowboys, Canberra Raiders, Manly-Warringah Sea Eagles, Cronulla-Sutherland Sharks & New Zealand Warriors

=== Round 15 ===
Home	Score	Away	Match information
Home	Score	Away	Date and time (Local)	Venue	Referees	Attendance
Canberra Raiders	14 - 22	Canterbury-Bankstown Bulldogs	20 June 2014, 7:45 pm	GIO Stadium		10,873
New Zealand Warriors	19 - 10	Brisbane Broncos	21 June 2014, 7:30 pm	Mt Smart Stadium		16,025
Cronulla-Sutherland Sharks	0 - 26	Manly-Warringah Sea Eagles	21 June 2014, 7:30 pm	Remondis Stadium		13,383
Melbourne Storm	46 - 20	Parramatta Eels	22 June 2014, 2:00 pm	AAMI Park	Ben Cummings; Grant Atkins	12,635
Gold Coast Titans	18 - 19	St. George Illawarra Dragons	22 June 2014, 3:00 pm	Cbus Super Stadium		12,189
Newcastle Knights	36 - 28	North Queensland Cowboys	23 June 2014, 7:00 pm	Hunter Stadium		11,925
Bye: Penrith Panthers, South Sydney Rabbitohs, Sydney Roosters & Wests Tigers

- Cronulla became the first team in history to be held to nil 3 games in a row.

=== Round 16 ===
Home	Score	Away	Match information
Home	Score	Away	Date and time (Local)	Venue	Referees	Attendance
Manly-Warringah Sea Eagles	24 - 16	Sydney Roosters	27 June 2014, 7:40 pm	Brookvale Oval		17,155
Brisbane Broncos	22 - 24	Cronulla-Sutherland Sharks	27 June 2014, 7:40 pm	Suncorp Stadium		24,285
Wests Tigers	19 - 18	Canberra Raiders	28 June 2014, 5:30 pm	Campbelltown Stadium		9,243
North Queensland Cowboys	20 - 18	South Sydney Rabbitohs	28 June 2014, 7:30 pm	1300SMILES Stadium		15,897
New Zealand Warriors	30 - 20	Penrith Panthers	29 June 2014, 4:00 pm	Mt Smart Stadium		12,801
Parramatta Eels	10 - 16	Newcastle Knights	29 June 2014, 3:00 pm	Pirtek Stadium	Jared Maxwell; Henry Perenara	15,566
St. George Illawarra Dragons	24 - 12	Melbourne Storm	30 June 2014, 7:00 pm	WIN Stadium		10,117
Bye: Canterbury-Bankstown Bulldogs & Gold Coast Titans

- Cronulla completed the biggest comeback in their history, coming back from 22-0 down to overwhelm the Broncos 24–22, the record would stand for just 8 days.

=== Round 17 ===
Home	Score	Away	Match information
Home	Score	Away	Date and time (Local)	Venue	Referees	Attendance
Canterbury-Bankstown Bulldogs	23 - 16	Manly-Warringah Sea Eagles	4 July 2014, 7:45 pm	ANZ Stadium, Sydney		14,921
St. George Illawarra Dragons	27 - 24	North Queensland Cowboys	5 July 2014, 5:30 pm	WIN Jubilee Oval		12,082
Sydney Roosters	28 - 30	Cronulla-Sutherland Sharks	5 July 2014, 7:30 pm	Allianz Stadium		10,732
Wests Tigers	10 - 26	Penrith Panthers	6 July 2014, 3:00 pm	Leichhardt Oval		16,698
South Sydney Rabbitohs	10 - 14	Gold Coast Titans	7 July 2014, 7:00 pm	ANZ Stadium, Sydney		10,925
Bye: Brisbane Broncos, Parramatta Eels, Newcastle Knights, Canberra Raiders, Melbourne Storm & New Zealand Warriors

- Cronulla again successfully completed their biggest comeback, this time trailing the Roosters 24-0 before coming back to win 30–28, it is regarded as one of the biggest upset in NRL history.

=== Round 18 ===
Home	Score	Away	Match information
Home	Score	Away	Date and time (Local)	Venue	Referees	Attendance
Manly-Warringah Sea Eagles	40 - 8	Wests Tigers	11 July 2014, 7:45 pm	Brookvale Oval		13,432
New Zealand Warriors	48 - 0	Parramatta Eels	12 July 2014, 7:30 pm	Mt Smart Stadium	Gavin Badger; Henry Perenara	14,087
Melbourne Storm	4 - 6	Canterbury-Bankstown Bulldogs	12 July 2014, 7:30 pm	AAMI Park		13,149
Gold Coast Titans	20 - 36	Canberra Raiders	13 July 2014, 2:00 pm	Cbus Super Stadium		10,574
Cronulla-Sutherland Sharks	18 - 31	Newcastle Knights	13 July 2014, 3:00 pm	Remondis Stadium		17,242
Penrith Panthers	35 - 34	Brisbane Broncos	14 July 2014, 7:00 pm	Sportingbet Stadium		12,439
Bye: North Queensland Cowboys, St. George Illawarra Dragons, South Sydney Rabbitohs & Sydney Roosters

- The Bulldogs won in Melbourne for the first time since Round 11 2005, it was also their lowest winning score since 1993.

=== Round 19 ===
Home	Score	Away	Match information
Home	Score	Away	Date and time (Local)	Venue	Referees	Attendance
Cronulla-Sutherland Sharks	18 - 36	North Queensland Cowboys	18 July 2014, 7:40 pm	Remondis Stadium	Alan Shortall; Gavin Morris	9,366
Parramatta Eels	12 - 32	South Sydney Rabbitohs	18 July 2014, 7:40 pm	Pirtek Stadium	Jared Maxwell; Gavin Reynolds	16,125
Sydney Roosters	32 - 12	Penrith Panthers	19 July 2014, 3:00 pm	Allianz Stadium		13, 993
Melbourne Storm	28 - 14	Canberra Raiders	19 July 2014, 5:30 pm	AAMI Park		11,479
Brisbane Broncos	28 - 22	New Zealand Warriors	19 July 2014, 7:30 pm	Suncorp Stadium		37,082
Newcastle Knights	8 - 22	Gold Coast Titans	20 July 2014, 2:00 pm	Hunter Stadium		26,401
Wests Tigers	46 - 18	Canterbury-Bankstown Bulldogs	20 July 2014, 3:00 pm	ANZ Stadium, Sydney		22,225
St. George Illawarra Dragons	12 - 21	Manly-Warringah Sea Eagles	21 July 2014, 7:00 pm	WIN Jubilee Oval		10,530

=== Round 20 ===
Home	Score	Away	Match information
Home	Score	Away	Date and time (Local)	Venue	Referees	Attendance
Newcastle Knights	16 - 12	Sydney Roosters	25 July 2014, 7:40 pm	Hunter Stadium		15,468
Brisbane Broncos	8 - 30	Melbourne Storm	25 July 2014, 7:40 pm	Suncorp Stadium		36,319
Penrith Panthers	16 - 18	Cronulla-Sutherland Sharks	26 July 2014, 3:00 pm	Carrington Park		8,824
Gold Coast Titans	18 - 24	Parramatta Eels	26 July 2014, 5:30 pm	Cbus Super Stadium		14,175
Canterbury-Bankstown Bulldogs	12 - 20	North Queensland Cowboys	26 July 2014, 7:30 pm	ANZ Stadium, Sydney		9,873
New Zealand Warriors	12 - 22	Manly-Warringah Sea Eagles	27 July 2014, 4:00 pm	Mt Smart Stadium		19,199
Wests Tigers	12 - 28	St. George Illawarra Dragons	27 July 2014, 3:00 pm	ANZ Stadium, Sydney		22,618
Canberra Raiders	18 - 34	South Sydney Rabbitohs	28 July 2014, 7:00 pm	GIO Stadium		9,526

=== Round 21 ===
Home	Score	Away	Match information
Home	Score	Away	Date and time (Local)	Venue	Referees	Attendance
Manly-Warringah Sea Eagles	16 - 4	Brisbane Broncos	1 August 2014, 7:40 pm	Brookvale Oval		12,873
Canterbury-Bankstown Bulldogs	16 - 22	Penrith Panthers	1 August 2014, 7:45 pm	ANZ Stadium, Sydney		11,832
Cronulla-Sutherland Sharks	12 - 32	Parramatta Eels	2 August 2014,3:00pm	Remondis Stadium		12,798
North Queensland Cowboys	28 - 8	Gold Coast Titans	2 August 2014, 5:30 pm	1300 SMILES Stadium		14,487
Sydney Roosters	30 - 22	St. George Illawarra Dragons	2 August 2014, 7:30 pm	Allianz Stadium		13,083
Canberra Raiders	18 - 54	New Zealand Warriors	3 August 2014, 2:00 pm	GIO Stadium		7,094
South Sydney Rabbitohs	50 - 10	Newcastle Knights	3 August 2014, 3:00 pm	Barlow Park		11,570
Wests Tigers	6 - 28	Melbourne Storm	4 August 2014, 7:00 pm	Campbelltown Stadium		7,782

- The Warriors won their first game in Canberra since 2001, and first time at GIO Stadium since 1997, it was also the 7th instance of a team putting 50+ on the same opposition twice in a season, it was also the first time a team has scored 50+ against a team 3 games in a row.

=== Round 22 ===
Home	Score	Away	Match information
Home	Score	Away	Date and time (Local)	Venue	Referees	Attendance
South Sydney Rabbitohs	23 - 4	Manly-Warringah Sea Eagles	8 August 2014, 7:45 pm	Sydney Cricket Ground		27,062
Brisbane Broncos	41 - 10	Canterbury-Bankstown Bulldogs	8 August 2014, 7:45 pm	Suncorp Stadium		28,344
Newcastle Knights	32 - 30	Melbourne Storm	9 August 2014, 5:30 pm	Hunter Stadium		14,904
North Queensland Cowboys	64 - 6	Wests Tigers	9 August 2014, 7:30 pm	1300 SMILES Stadium		12,317
Parramatta Eels	18 - 10	Canberra Raiders	9 August 2014, 8:30 pm	TIO Stadium		9,527
New Zealand Warriors	16 - 12	Cronulla-Sutherland Sharks	10 August 2014, 2:00 pm	Mt Smart Stadium		13,939
St. George Illawarra Dragons	4 - 16	Penrith Panthers	10 August 2014, 3:00 pm	WIN Stadium		13,107
Sydney Roosters	26 - 18	Gold Coast Titans	11 August 2014, 7:00 pm	Allianz Stadium		6,345

The North Queensland Cowboys set a new club record for largest winning margin in their 64–6 victory over Wests Tigers.

The Newcastle Knights defeated the Melbourne Storm with a dramatic ending. 30–20 to the Storm at 77mins until the Knights came back at took a 32-30 point win.

=== Round 23 ===
Home	Score	Away	Match information
Home	Score	Away	Date and time (Local)	Venue	Referees	Attendance
South Sydney Rabbitohs	42-16	Brisbane Broncos	14 August 2014, 7:45 pm	ANZ Stadium, Sydney		14,092
Parramatta Eels	16 - 18	Canterbury-Bankstown Bulldogs	15 August 2014, 7:45 pm	ANZ Stadium, Sydney		30,394
Canberra Raiders	16 - 34	St. George Illawarra Dragons	16 August 2014, 3:00 pm	GIO Stadium		10,318
Melbourne Storm	48 - 6	Cronulla-Sutherland Sharks	16 August 2014, 5:30 pm	AAMI Park		12,185
Wests Tigers	4 - 48	Sydney Roosters	16 August 2014, 7:30 pm	Leichhardt Oval		5,297
Newcastle Knights	28 - 22	New Zealand Warriors	17 August 2014, 2:00 pm	Hunter Stadium		12,733
Gold Coast Titans	12 - 15	Manly-Warringah Sea Eagles	17 August 2014, 3:00 pm	Cbus Super Stadium		11,940
Penrith Panthers	23 - 22	North Queensland Cowboys	18 August 2014, 7:00 pm	Sportingbet Stadium		7,276

- St George Illawarra's win was their first in Canberra since July 2000

=== Round 24 ===
Home	Score	Away	Match information
Home	Score	Away	Date and time (Local)	Venue	Referees	Attendance
Canterbury-Bankstown Bulldogs	30 - 10	Wests Tigers	21 August 2014, 7:45 pm	ANZ Stadium, Sydney		9,877
Parramatta Eels	22 - 12	Manly-Warringah Sea Eagles	22 August 2014, 7:45 pm	Pirtek Stadium		17,706
Brisbane Broncos	48 - 6	Newcastle Knights	23 August 2014, 5:30 pm	Suncorp Stadium		22,292
South Sydney Rabbitohs	10 - 22	North Queensland Cowboys	23 August 2014, 7:30 pm	ANZ Stadium		17,171
New Zealand Warriors	12 - 46	Sydney Roosters	24 August 2014, noon	Mt Smart Stadium		19,676
Cronulla-Sutherland Sharks	12 - 22	Canberra Raiders	24 August 2014, 2:00 pm	Remondis Stadium		13,496
St. George Illawarra Dragons	34 - 6	Gold Coast Titans	24 August 2014, 3:00 pm	WIN Jubilee Oval		9,584
Penrith Panthers	10 - 24	Melbourne Storm	25 August 2014, 7:00 pm	Sportingbet Stadium		8,994

=== Round 25 ===
Home	Score	Away	Match information
Home	Score	Away	Date and time (Local)	Venue	Referees	Attendance
Canterbury-Bankstown Bulldogs	14 - 21	South Sydney Rabbitohs	28 August 2014, 7:45 pm	ANZ Stadium		20,424
Brisbane Broncos	30 - 22	St. George Illawarra Dragons	29 August 2014, 7:45 pm	Suncorp Stadium		36,720
Newcastle Knights	42 - 12	Parramatta Eels	30 August 2014, 3:00 pm	Hunter Stadium		18,558
Canberra Raiders	27 - 12	Wests Tigers	30 August 2014, 5:30 pm	GIO Stadium Canberra		8,287
Sydney Roosters	24 - 12	Melbourne Storm	30 August 2014, 7:30 pm	Allianz Stadium		13,879
New Zealand Warriors	42 - 0	Gold Coast Titans	31 August 2014, 2:00 pm	Mt Smart Stadium		13,540
Manly Warringah Sea Eagles	26 - 25	Penrith Panthers	31 August 2014, 3:00 pm	Brookvale Oval		18,654
North Queensland Cowboys	20 - 19	Cronulla-Sutherland Sharks	1 September 2014, 7:00 pm	1300SMILES Stadium		11,712

The Warriors' 42–0 win over the Gold Coast was the first time the Titans had been kept scoreless.

=== Round 26 ===
Home	Score	Away	Match information
Home	Score	Away	Date and time (Local)	Venue	Referees	Attendance
Sydney Roosters	22 - 18	South Sydney Rabbitohs	4 September 2014, 7:45 pm	Allianz Stadium		32,481
Melbourne Storm	22 - 12	Brisbane Broncos	5 September 2014, 7:45 pm	AAMI Park		20,032
Wests Tigers	26 - 10	Cronulla-Sutherland Sharks	6 September 2014, 3:00 pm	Leichhardt Oval		5,112
Canberra Raiders	33 - 20	Parramatta Eels	6 September 2014, 5:30 pm	GIO Stadium Canberra		13,706
North Queensland Cowboys	30 - 16	Manly-Warringah Sea Eagles	6 September 2014, 7:30 pm	1300SMILES Stadium		22,521
Newcastle Knights	40 - 10	St. George Illawarra Dragons	7 September 2014, 2:00 pm	Hunter Stadium		20,424
Gold Coast Titans	19 - 18	Canterbury-Bankstown Bulldogs	7 September 2014, 3:00 pm	Cbus Super Stadium		12,563
Penrith Panthers	22 - 6	New Zealand Warriors	7 September 2014, 6:30 pm	Sportingbet Stadium		13,551

== Finals series ==
Qualifying and elimination finals
13 September 2014
1	Sydney Roosters	18
4	Penrith Panthers	19
13 September 2014
5	North Queensland Cowboys	32
8	Brisbane Broncos	20
14 September 2014
6	Melbourne Storm	4
7	Canterbury-Bankstown Bulldogs	28
12 September 2014
2	Manly-Warringah Sea Eagles	24
3	South Sydney Rabbitohs	40

Semi-finals
19 September 2014
Sydney Roosters	31
North Queensland Cowboys	30
20 September 2014
Manly-Warringah Sea Eagles	17
Canterbury-Bankstown Bulldogs	18

Preliminary finals
27 September 2014
Penrith Panthers	12
Canterbury-Bankstown Bulldogs	18
26 September 2014
South Sydney Rabbitohs	32
Sydney Roosters	22

Grand final
5 October 2014 ANZ Stadium
Canterbury-Bankstown Bulldogs	6
South Sydney Rabbitohs	30

=== Qualifying and Elimination Finals ===
1st Qualifying Final

12 September 2014
8:00pm

Manly Warringah Sea Eagles	24 – 40	South Sydney Rabbitohs
Tries: Brett Stewart (64') 1 Jamie Lyon (68') 1 Tom Symonds (75') 1 Cheyse Blair (79') 1 Goals: Jamie Lyon 4/4 (65', 69', 76', 80')	1st: 0 - 22; 2nd: 24 - 18	Tries: 2 (11', 42') Adam Reynolds; 2 (35', 55') Alex Johnson; 1 (18') Luke Keary; 1 (27') Lote Tuqiri; 1 (52') Dylan Walker; Goals: 6/7 Adam Reynolds (12', 19, 28', 43', 53', 56')

Allianz Stadium
Attendance: 25,733
Referee: Shayne Hayne, Gavin Badger

2nd Qualifying Final

13 September 2014
5:50pm

Sydney Roosters	18 – 19	Penrith Panthers
Tries: Michael Jennings (31') 1 Shaun Kenny-Dowall (46') 1 Mitchell Pearce (74') 1 Goals: James Maloney 3/3 (32', 46', 75')	1st: 6 - 4; 2nd: 12 - 15	Tries: 2 (52', 77') Dean Whare; 1 (25') Josh Mansour; Goals: 3/4 Jamie Soward (53', 58' pen, 78'); Field Goals: 1 (80') Jamie Soward

Allianz Stadium
Attendance: 23,449
Referee: Jared Maxwell, Henry Perenara

1st Elimination Final

13 September 2014
7:55pm

North Queensland Cowboys	32 – 20	Brisbane Broncos
Tries: Gavin Cooper (9', 38') 2 Kane Linnett (12') 1 Robert Lui (19') 1 Michael Morgan (65') 1 Goals: 6/6 Johnathan Thurston (10', 14', 20', 39', 66', 71' pen)	1st: 24 - 0; 2nd: 8 - 20	Tries: 2 (54', 59') Jordan Kahu; 1 (52') Ben Barba; 1 (72') Daniel Vidot; Goals: 2/4 (55', 73') Corey Parker

1300SMILES Stadium
Attendance: 25,120
Referee: Gerard Sutton, Ben Cummins

2nd Elimination Final

14 September 2014
4:10pm

Melbourne Storm	4 – 28	Canterbury Bankstown Bulldogs
Tries: Sisa Waqa (46') 1 Goals: 0/1	1st: 0 - 24; 2nd: 4 - 4	Tries: 3 Tim Lafai (17', 37', 75'); 1 (6') Greg Eastwood; 1 (13') Trent Hodkinson; Goals: 4/5 Trent Hodkinson (7', 15', 19', 38')

AAMI Park
Attendance: 19,230
Referee: Matt Cecchin, Gavin Badger

=== Semi finals ===
1st Semi Final

19 September 2014
7:55pm

Sydney Roosters	31 – 30	North Queensland Cowboys
Tries: Daniel Tupou (16', 26') 2 Mitchell Pearce (3') 1 Michael Jennings (21') 1 James Maloney (31') 1 Goals: James Maloney 5/5 (5', 18', 22', 29', 33'); Field Goals: James Maloney (76') 1	1st: 30 - 12; 2nd: 1 - 18	Tries: 1 (35') Ethan Lowe; 1 (38') Gavin Cooper; 1 (46') Johnathan Thurston; 1 (50') Robert Lui; 1 (56') Matthew Scott; Goals: 5/5 Johnathan Thurston (35', 38', 47', 51', 57')

Allianz Stadium
Attendance: 18,355
Referee: Shayne Hayne, Gavin Badger

2nd Semi Final

20 September 2014
7:45pm

Manly Warringah Sea Eagles	17 – 18	Canterbury Bankstown Bulldogs
Tries: Jayden Hodges (40') 1 Brett Stewart (65') 1 Cheyse Blair (71') 1 Goals: Jamie Lyon (40', 66') 2/3; Field Goals: Daly Cherry-Evans (79') 1	1st: 6 - 16; 2nd: 11 - 1 GP: 0 - 1	Tries: 1 (10') Mitch Brown; 1 (14') Corey Thompson; 1 (18') Sam Perrett; Goals: 2/3 (15', 19') Trent Hodkinson; Field Goals: 2 (75', 84') Trent Hodkinson

Allianz Stadium
Attendance: 28,186
Referee: Gerard Sutton, Ben Cummins

=== Preliminary Finals ===
2014 saw the first time since the NRL's formation in 1998 that the last four remaining teams were all from Sydney.

1st Preliminary Final

26 September 2014
7.55pm

South Sydney Rabbitohs	32 – 22	Sydney Roosters
Tries: Greg Inglis (52', 65') 2 Lote Tuqiri (20') 1 Alex Johnson (30') 1 Ben Te'o (44') 1 Goals: Adam Reynolds 6/6 (21', 31', 46', 53', 66', 73' pen)	1st: 12 - 12; 2nd: 20 - 10	Tries: 2 (8', 80') Anthony Minichiello; 1 (5') Mitchell Pearce; 1 (79') Aidan Guerra; Goals: 3/4 James Maloney (6', 9', 79')

ANZ Stadium
Attendance: 52,592
Referee: Gerard Sutton, Ben Cummins

2nd Preliminary Final

27 September 2014
7.45pm

Penrith Panthers	12 – 18	Canterbury Bankstown Bulldogs
Tries: Matthew Moylan (40') 1 Dallin Watene-Zelezniak (72') 1 Goals: Jamie Soward (40', 73') 2/2	1st: 6 - 12; 2nd: 6 - 6	Tries: 1 (15') James Graham; 1 (27') Josh Jackson; 1 (58') Dale Finucane; Goals: 3/3 Tim Lafai (16', 29', 59')

ANZ Stadium
Attendance: 46,168
Referee: Shayne Hayne, Gavin Badger

== Grand final ==
Sunday, 5th of October
7:20pm (AEDT)

South Sydney Rabbitohs	30 – 6	Canterbury Bankstown Bulldogs
Tries: Alex Johnston (20') 1 George Burgess (56') 1 Kirisome Auva'a (73') 1 Adam Reynolds (78') 1 Greg Inglis(80') 1 Goals: Adam Reynolds 5/7 (27' pen, 57', 64' pen, 75', 79')	1st: 6 - 0; 2nd: 24 - 6	Tries: 1 (49') Tony Williams; Goals: 1/1 (50') Trent Hodkinson

ANZ Stadium
Attendance: 83,833
Referee: Shayne Hayne, Gerard Sutton
Player of the Match: Sam Burgess
