= Henry Perenara =

New Zealand international rugby league footballer and referee

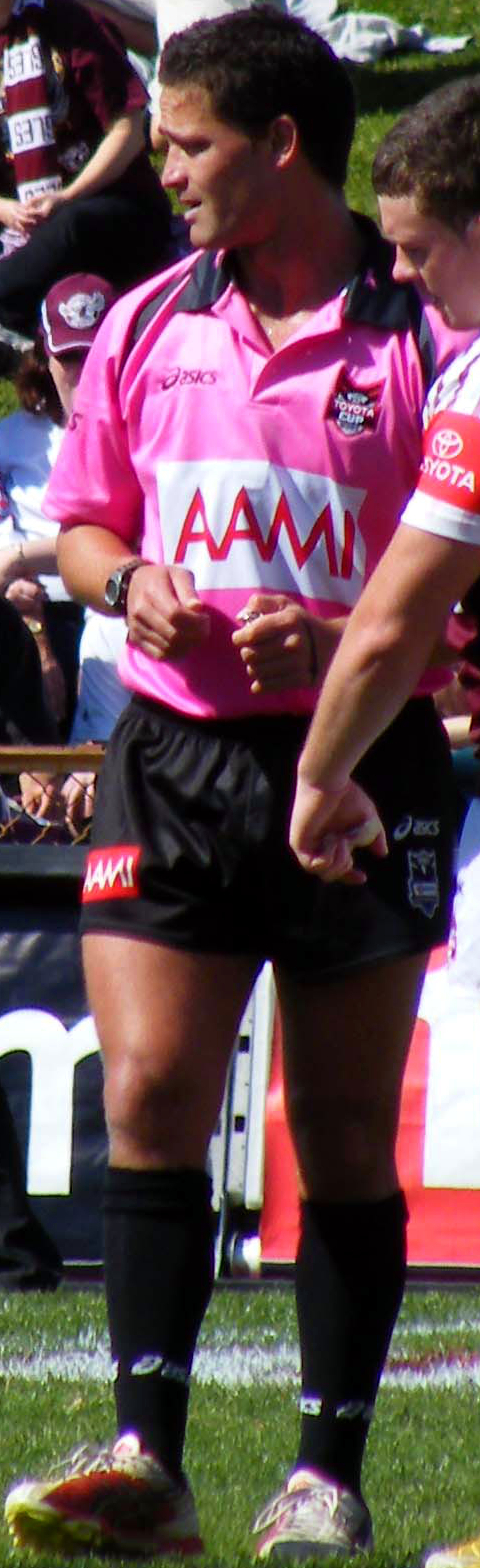

Personal information
- Full name: Henry Edward Peranara
- Born: 16 June 1980 (age 46) Auckland, New Zealand
- Height: 186 cm (6 ft 1 in)
- Weight: 100 kg (15 st 10 lb)

Playing information
- Position: Lock, Second-row
Club
Years	Team	Pld	T	G	FG	P
2000	New Zealand Warriors	3	0	0	0	0
2001–02	Melbourne Storm	33	8	0	0	32
2003–04	St. George Illawarra	16	1	0	0	4
2005–06	Parramatta Eels	11	1	0	0	4
2007	Cronulla Sharks	9	2	0	0	8
	Total	72	12	0	0	48
Representative
Years	Team	Pld	T	G	FG	P
1999–00	New Zealand Māori	2	0	0	0	0
2001	New Zealand	1	0	0	0	0

Refereeing information
Years	Competition	Apps
2011–21	National Rugby League	127
2011–14	Four Nations	3
2013	Rugby League World Cup	5
- Education: Lynfield College
- Relatives: Marcus Perenara (brother); Sonny Bill Williams (cousin); Niall Guthrie (cousin); TJ Perenara (cousin)

Henry Edward Perenara (born 16 June 1980) is a New Zealand rugby league former referee and professional footballer who represented New Zealand. He played as a lock, though he could also play in the second-row. He is also the first NRL referee in history to send off a player for an alleged bite, he sent Kevin Proctor off in the Round 14 match of 2020, when Cronulla-Sutherland played against the Gold Coast.

== Background ==
Perenara was born in Auckland, New Zealand.

He is a brother of Marcus Perenara and is a cousin of Sonny Bill Williams, and Hurricanes and All Blacks halfback TJ Perenara.

== Early years ==
Attending Lynfield College, Perenara played for the New Lynn Stags and Bay Roskill Vikings and represented the New Zealand Secondary Schools team in 1998.

== Playing career ==
In 1999, while under contract to the Warriors, Perenara played for Auckland North in the National Provincial Competition. He was part of the Glenora Bears side that dominated the Auckland Rugby League competition that year, winning the Roope Rooster, Ruataki Shield and Fox Memorial.

Perenara played for the Cronulla-Sutherland Sharks, St. George Illawarra Dragons, Melbourne Storm, Auckland Warriors and Parramatta in the National Rugby League competition.

== Referee career ==
Perenara retired as a player in 2007 to join the National Rugby League's referee cadet programme. He made his first grade referee debut in 2011.

He was to make his Test debut on 6 October however the scheduled Test between the New Zealand national rugby league team and the Cook Islands was cancelled. Instead, Perenara's Test debut came on 29 October 2011 when he controlled the Four Nations match between England and Wales. He was named the 2011 New Zealand Rugby League's referee of the year. He is one of only four New Zealanders to play for New Zealand and referee a test match.

In mid April 2021 Perenara retired at the age of 41 due to a heart condition. Perenara revealed to the Daily Telegraph he had been diagnosed with supraventricular tachycardia, an abnormally fast heartbeat that causes shortness of breath, dizziness sweating or fainting.
