= Dutch New Zealanders =

Dutch New Zealanders Nederlandse Nieuw-Zeelanders
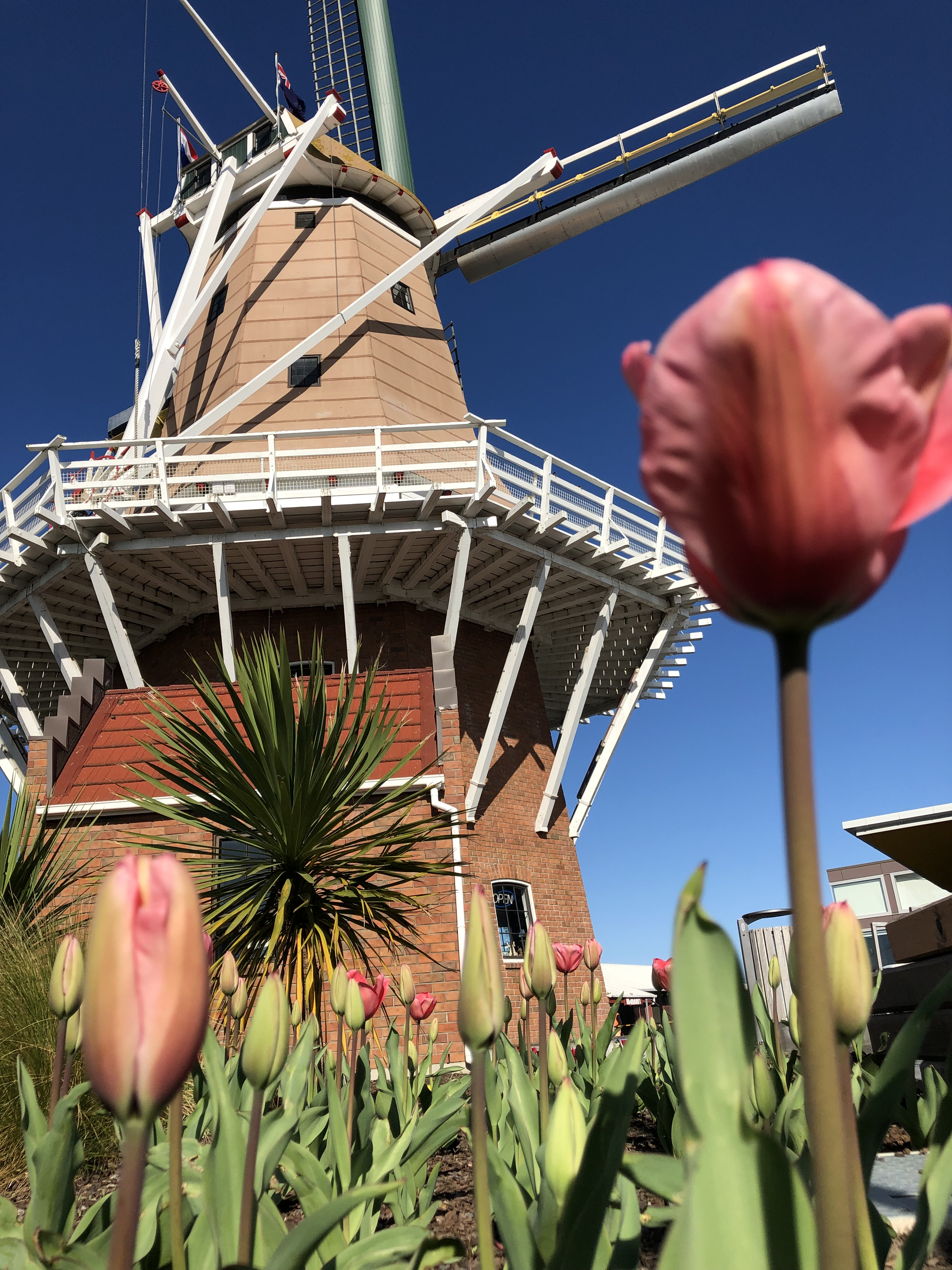
- A Dutch-style stellingmolen (windmill) in Foxton, New Zealand

Total population
- 29,820 (by ancestry, 2018)

Languages
- New Zealand English, Dutch

Religion
- Protestantism, Roman Catholicism

Related ethnic groups
- Dutch people, Dutch Australians, European New Zealanders

Dutch New Zealanders (Dutch: Nederlandse Nieuw-Zeelanders; Afrikaans: Nederlandse Nieu-Seelanders) are New Zealanders of Dutch ancestry. Dutch migration to New Zealand dates back to the earliest period of European colonisation. The 2013 census recorded 19,815 people born in the Netherlands and 28,503 people claiming Dutch ethnicity.

The Netherlands' embassy in Wellington estimated there were approximately 45,000 Dutch citizens residing in New Zealand. This number includes persons with dual New Zealand and Dutch nationality. As many as 100,000 New Zealanders are estimated to be of Dutch descent.

== History ==
Large-scale immigration to New Zealand began after World War II. By 1968, 28,366 Dutch immigrants had settled in New Zealand, which made them the largest immigrant group after English New Zealanders. Dutch clubs were formed in areas with high numbers of Dutch immigrants to foster language skills, however a large proportion of Dutch New Zealanders lost the ability to speak Dutch.

In the 1950s, the Dutch immigrants Rolf Feijen and Hans Romaine formed the Restaurant Association of New Zealand. Lobbying by the association made restaurants such as Otto Groen's Otto Groen and the Dutch Kiwi, a restaurant located in Waiatarua, in the Waitākere Ranges of Auckland, become the first in New Zealand that was allowed to serve wine with meals.

== Demographics ==
There were 29,820 people identifying as being part of the Dutch ethnic group at the 2018 New Zealand census, making up 0.6% of New Zealand's population. This is an increase of 1,317 people (4.6%) since the 2013 census, and an increase of 1,179 people (4.1%) since the 2006 census. Some of the increase between the 2013 and 2018 census was due to Statistics New Zealand adding ethnicity data from other sources (previous censuses, administrative data, and imputation) to the 2018 census data to reduce the number of non-responses.

There were 14,502 males and 15,315 females, giving a sex ratio of 0.947 males per female. Of the population, 5,580 people (18.7%) were aged under 15 years, 5,598 (18.8%) were 15 to 29, 12,138 (40.7%) were 30 to 64, and 6,501 (21.8%) were 65 or older.

In terms of population distribution, 75.6% lived in the North Island and 24.5% lived in the South Island. Great Barrier Island had the highest concentration of Dutch people at 1.3%, followed by the Carterton District and the South Waikato District (both 1.2%). The Chatham Islands had the lowest concentration, recording no Dutch people.

== National Museum ==
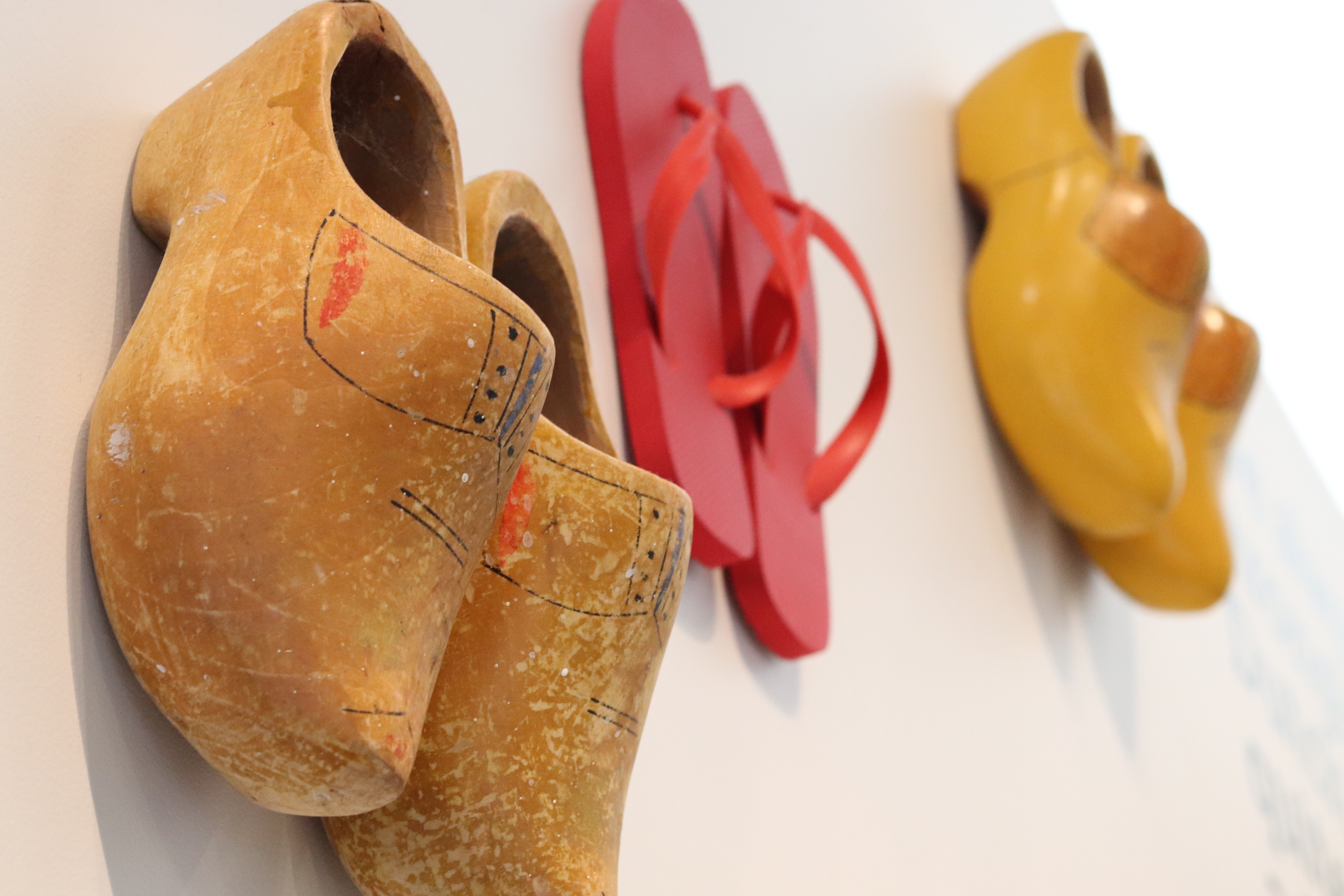
Nederlanders - A foot in both worlds: Oranjehof Museum

The Oranjehof museum, in Foxton, tells the story of the Dutch immigrants in New Zealand. It also plays a national role in connecting the Dutch community, which is spread all through New Zealand. The Oranjehof Dutch Connection Centre is part of the Te Awahou Riverside Cultural Park, which also includes the flour-grinding windmill De Molen - a Stellingmolen, built to a 17th-century design.

== Notable Dutch New Zealanders ==
- Ineke Crezee, author, scholar
- Harry Duynhoven, former Labour MP and mayor of New Plymouth
- Elizabeth Geertruida Agatha Dyson-Weersma, journalist
- Johannes La Grouw, architect and engineer
- Henry Keesing, community leader
- Adrian Langerwerf, Catholic missionary and writer
- Marja Lubeck, Member of Parliament (Labour list MP)
- Herman van Staveren, rabbi and philanthropist
- Maarten Wevers, diplomat

=== Artists ===
- Frank Carpay, designer
- The de Jong brothers of rock band Alien Weaponry
- Riemke Ensing, poet
- Kees Hos, artist and co-founder New Vision Gallery
- Vicky Rodewyk, model and dancer
- Theodorus Johannes Schoon, artist
- Bernardina Adriana Schramm, pianist
- Petrus Van der Velden, artist
- Hayley Westenra, classical artist
- Ans Westra, photographer
- Lydia Wevers, literary critic

=== Sportspeople ===
- Arthur Borren, field hockey player
- Jan Borren, field hockey player
- Marie-Jose Cooper, association football player
- Andrew de Boorder, cricketer
- Derek de Boorder, cricketer
- Michelle de Bruyn, association football player
- Chris van der Drift, racecar driver
- Clarissa Eshuis, field hockey player
- Paul Gerritsen, rower
- Shane van Gisbergen, racing driver
- Willem de Graaf, association football player
- Frank van Hattum, association football player
- Carl Hoeft, rugby union footballer
- Fred de Jong, association football player
- Reuben de Jong, kickboxer and wrestler
- Chris Kuggeleijn, cricketer
- Grazia MacIntosh, association football player
- Kees Meeuws, rugby player
- Marlies Oostdam, association football player
- Simon Poelman, decathlete
- Anita Punt, field hockey player
- Dick Quax, athlete, and later a city councillor
- Riki van Steeden, association football player
- Tino Tabak, cyclist
- Wybo Veldman, rower
- Simon van Velthooven, cyclist
- Eric Verdonk, rower
- Johan Verweij, association football player
- Peter Visser, cricketer
- Elizabeth Van Welie, swimmer
- Natalie Wiegersma, swimmer

== See also ==
- Demographics of New Zealand
- European New Zealanders
- Europeans in Oceania
- Netherlands–New Zealand relations
- Dutch Australians
