= Oskar van Hattum =

New Zealand footballer (born 2002)

Personal information
- Full name: Oskar Takoda van Hattum
- Date of birth: 14 April 2002 (age 24)
- Place of birth: New Plymouth, New Zealand
- Height: 1.83 m (6 ft 0 in)
- Position: Forward

Team information
- Current team: South Island United
- Number: 11

Youth career
- 2017–2024: Wellington Phoenix

Senior career*
Years	Team	Apps	(Gls)
2018–2024	Wellington Phoenix Reserves	23	(8)
2021–2025	Wellington Phoenix	41	(1)
2025	Sligo Rovers	12	(0)
2025	Valour FC	1	(0)
2026–	South Island United	12	(0)

International career^{‡}
2018–2019	New Zealand U-17		
2023–	New Zealand U-23	5	(2)
2024–	New Zealand	2	(0)
Medal record
Men's football
Representing New Zealand
OFC Nations Cup
Winner	2024 Fiji/Vanuatu
OFC U-16 Championship
Winner	2018 Tonga/Solomon Islands
- * Club domestic league appearances and goals as of 21 May 2026 ‡ National team caps and goals as of 23 July 2024

Oskar Takoda van Hattum (born 14 April 2002) is a New Zealand professional footballer who plays as a forward or winger for OFC Pro League side South Island United.

== Club career ==
=== Youth career ===
Van Hattum played football for Francis Douglas Memorial College in New Plymouth, and played representative football for Taranaki and Central Football with whom he won the golden boot at the under-14 national age group tournament in 2016. In 2017, van Hattum moved to Wellington to join the Wellington Phoenix Academy.

=== Wellington Phoenix ===
In December 2021, van Hattum was among three academy players called up to join the Wellington Phoenix A-League squad in Australia ahead of a busy schedule and was named amongst the substitutes for the A-League game against Western Sydney Wanderers later that week. He made his professional debut on 7 December 2021 in a FFA Cup match against A-League Men side Western United FC.

Van Hattum made his A-League debut on the 19 December 2021, in a 2–1 loss against Sydney FC.

=== Sligo Rovers ===
On 11 January 2025, Van Hattum signed for League of Ireland Premier Division club Sligo Rovers on a one year contract.

=== Valour FC ===
On 26 August 2025, he signed for Canadian Premier League club Valour FC on a free transfer.

=== South Island United ===
On 9 December 2025, Van Hattum returned to New Zealand to sign for newly founded OFC Pro League side South Island United.

== International career ==
Van Hattum was named in the New Zealand U-17 side for the 2018 OFC U-16 Championship in Honiara, appearing in all 5 matches and scoring 4 goals including the first penalty of the final as New Zealand won the tournament, beating hosts Solomon Islands on penalties in the final. Both finalists earned the right to represent Oceania at the 2019 FIFA U-17 World Cup in Brazil.

Van Hattum played all three games in the group stage at the finals in Brazil as New Zealand finished third in their group.

His first New Zealand senior international cap came in the opening game at the 2024 OFC Nations Cup against Solomon Islands on 18 June 2024

The following month, in July 2024, van Hattum represented the New Zealand U23 side, the "OlyWhites" at the Paris Olympics, featuring in all three group stage games.

== Personal life ==
Van Hattum is the son of a New Zealand-born father of Dutch descent and an Australian-born mother of Austrian descent. He is the nephew of notable former New Zealand goalkeeper Frank van Hattum and former New Zealand women's internationals Grazia MacIntosh and Marie-Jose Cooper.

== Career statistics ==
=== Club ===
Appearances and goals by club, season and competition
Club	Season	League			Cup		Others		Total	
Club	Season	Division	Apps	Goals	Apps	Goals	Apps	Goals	Apps	Goals

== Honours ==
New Zealand

- OFC Nations Cup: 2024
