= Stella Pennell =

New Zealander karateka and academic

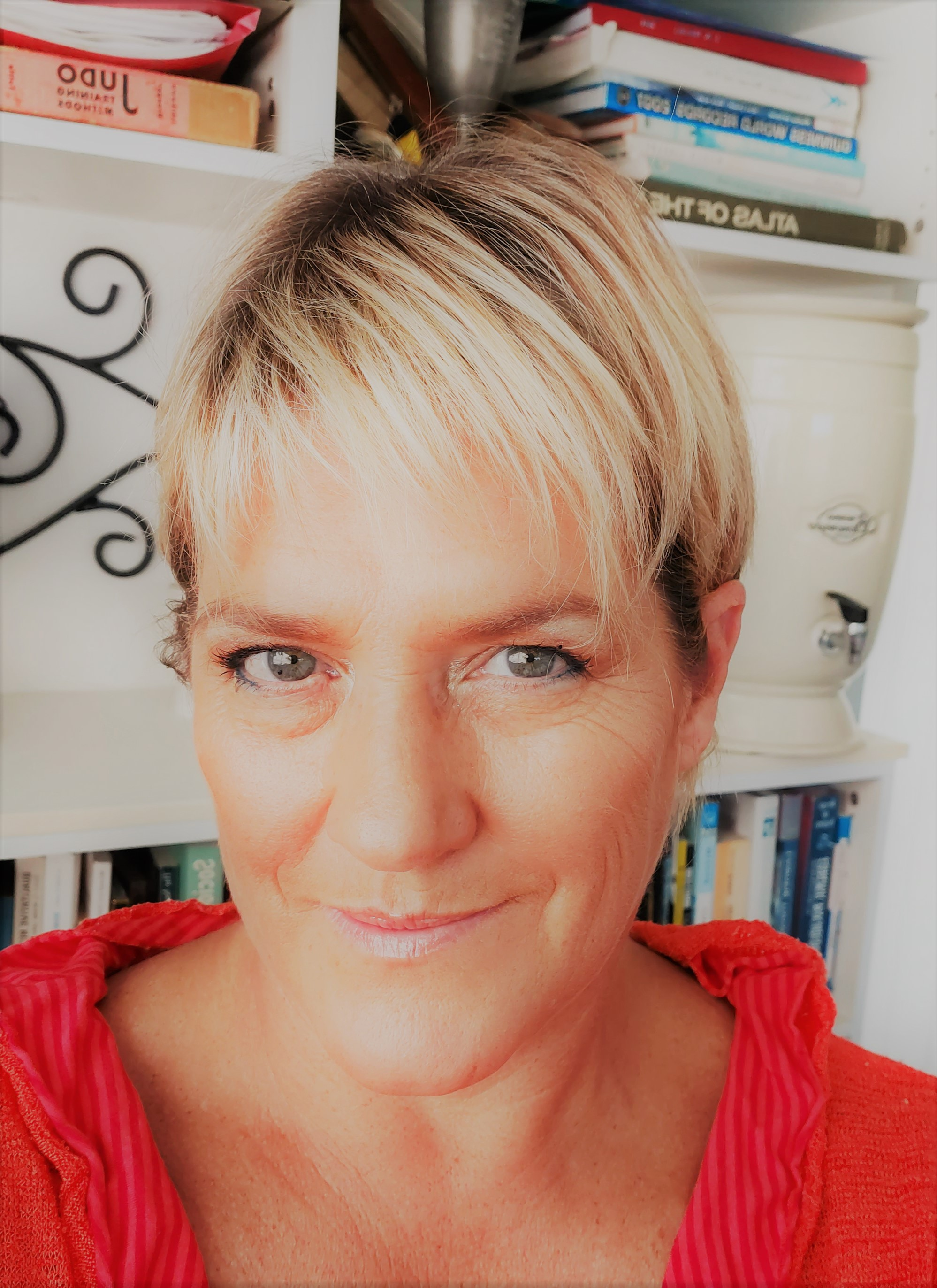

Stella Pennell (born 11 June 1965 as Stella-Maria van Hattum) represented New Zealand in Karate as Stella Lenihan from 1992 to 1996.

== Karate career ==
Pennell was Oceania Champion, New Zealand Champion, New South Wales (Australia) champion.

She was a repecharge finalist at World Karate Federation World Cup and World Championship. Pennell retired from competition in 1996 and commenced coaching New Zealand Women's Team. A recipient of Prime Minister's scholarship, she coached Krissie Paige to a silver medal at Junior World Championships in Greece 2001. She won the Upper Hutt Sportsperson of the Year award in the category of Coach of the Year and Special Achievement Award (2003) and won the Coach of the Year award again in 2004.

Pennell retired from international coaching in 2006. She continues to coach at local level in Whitianga, New Zealand

Pennell is the sister of former All White Frank van Hattum and Marie-Jose Griffith (prev. Marie-Jose Cooper / née van Hattum) and Grazia MacIntosh (née van Hattum) who represented New Zealand with the New Zealand women's national football team, the Football Ferns.

== Academic career ==
Stella Pennell gained her PhD in sociology from Massey University in 2020. Her PhD research "Trouble in paradise: contradictions in platform capitalism and the production of surplus by Airbnb hosts in regional tourist towns" explores the production of subjectivity in Airbnb hosts in Aotearoa New Zealand, the impacts of biopolitical messaging by the Airbnb platform on hosts lived experiences, and the production of surplus meaning and surplus enjoyment by hosts as they attempt top make sense of their engagement with platform capitalism

Pennell gained her Masters in sociology (with Distinction) in 2016. The Masters research titled "Escape to the Beach: Pre-retirement in-migrants' narratives of change, place and identity" explores the subjectivity of the pre-retiree (50–65) cohort who relocate within Aotearoa New Zealand, with focus on sense-making of place and identity.

Her Bachelor of Arts (psychology/sociology) was awarded in 2014, and she was awarded the title of "Massey Scholar", conferred on undergraduate students who achieved in the top 5% across the university for that year.

She lectured at Massey University, Albany, and taught into the core BA programme at Massey University, Albany, and the sociology programme in the School of People, Environment and Planning (Massey University).

Stella Pennell was the secretary of the Sociological Association of Aotearoa New Zealand from 2018 to 2024 (SAANZ).

After leaving Massey University in 2022 Stella Pennell worked as a contract Sociologist, predominantly in the not-for-profit sector, and as Lead Instructional Designer for Values Identifier
