= Beauden Barrett =

New Zealand rugby union player (born 1991)

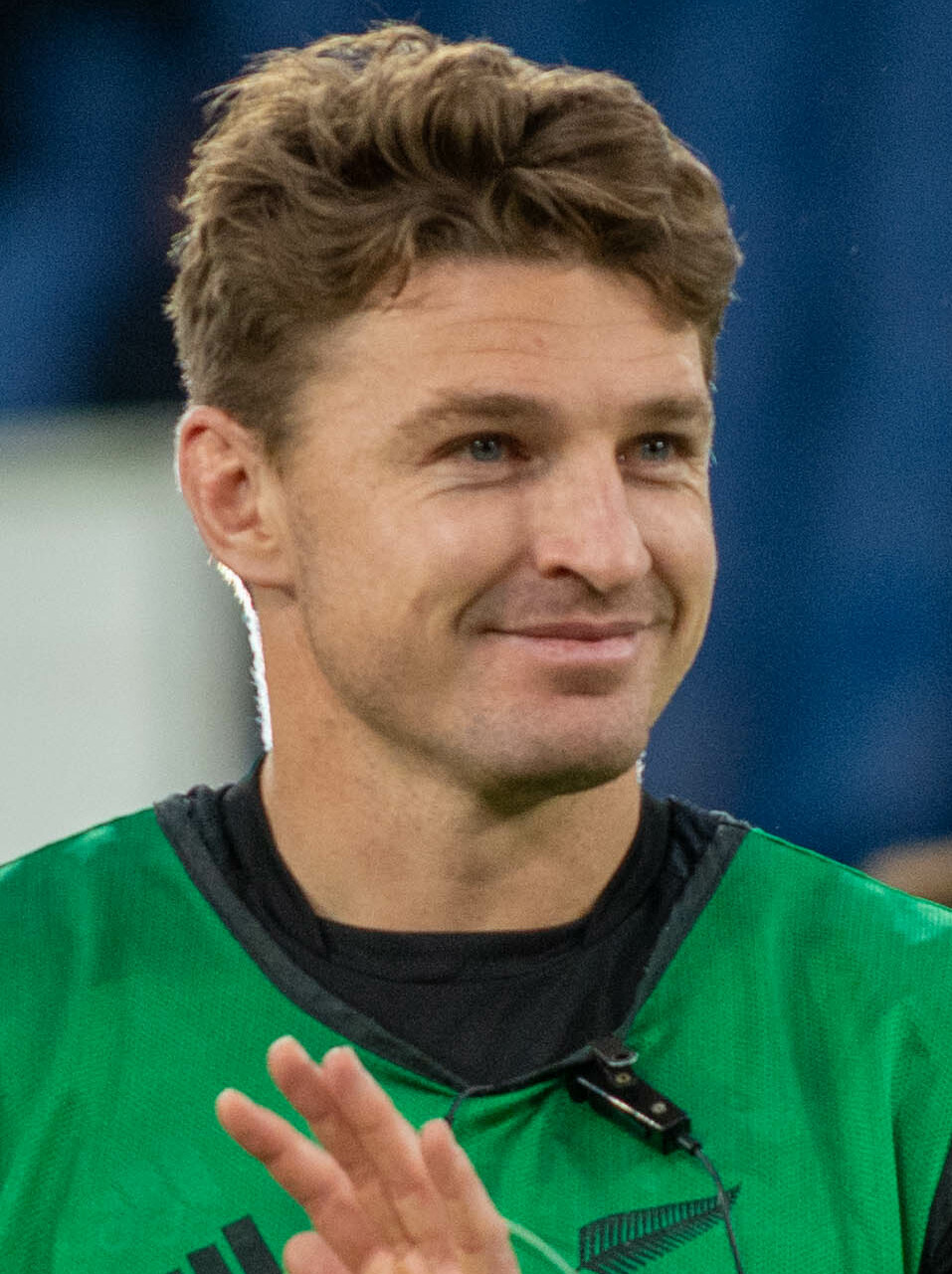
- Barrett in November 2021
- Full name: Beauden John Barrett
- Born: 27 May 1991 (age 35) New Plymouth, Taranaki, New Zealand
- Height: 1.87 m (6 ft 2 in)
- Weight: 87 kg (192 lb; 13 st 10 lb)
- School: Francis Douglas Memorial College
- Notable relative(s): Jordie Barrett (brother); Kane Barrett (brother); Scott Barrett (brother)

Rugby union career
- Position(s): Fly half, Fullback
- Current team: Blues
Senior career
| Years | Team | Apps | (Points) |
| 2010– | Taranaki | 29 | (191) |
| 2011–2019 | Hurricanes | 125 | (1,238) |
| 2020– | Blues | 55 | (392) |
| 2021 | Suntory Sungoliath | 10 | (168) |
| 2023–2024 | Toyota Verblitz | 13 | (107) |
- Correct as of 28 July 2026
International career
| Years | Team | Apps | (Points) |
| 2011 | New Zealand U20 | 5 | (17) |
| 2012– | New Zealand | 150 | (860) |
- Correct as of 21 November 2026
National sevens team
| Years | Team | | Comps |
| 2010 | New Zealand | | 2 |
- Correct as of 24 November 2024
Medal record
Men's Rugby union
Representing New Zealand
| Gold medal – first place | 2015 England | Squad |
| Bronze medal – third place | 2019 Japan | Squad |
| Silver medal – second place | 2023 France | Squad |

Beauden John Barrett (born 27 May 1991) is a New Zealand rugby union player who plays as first five-eighth or fullback for the All Blacks, Blues and (formerly) Hurricanes in Super Rugby, and Taranaki in the National Provincial Championship.

Barrett won the World Rugby Player of the Year awards in 2016 and 2017, was also a nominee for the award in 2018, and is only the second player to win the award in consecutive years, after former teammate Richie McCaw. He also won the overall Sportsperson of the Year Award in the Taranaki Sports Awards in 2013, 2016 and 2019.

Barrett played at under-20 and Sevens levels for New Zealand before being called into the All Blacks squad in May 2012, and made his international debut as a replacement in the final test against Ireland in Hamilton, when he kicked nine points, on 23 June 2012. He debuted for Taranaki in 2010, and debuted in Super Rugby with the Hurricanes in 2011.

Barrett holds the world record for consecutive wins since his first test (19 wins from 19 tests).

== Early life ==
Barrett was born in New Plymouth to parents Robyn and Kevin Barrett. He grew up on a farm in Pungarehu, a small town in South Taranaki near Ōpunake, with his seven siblings. He has four brothers and three sisters, including Kane, a former Blues representative and Taranaki captain and current All Blacks, Scott and Jordie. Barrett spent a year in Ireland when he was eight years old. He attended St Fiach's National School in Ballinacree, where he and his brother Kane learned how to play Gaelic football. He played for the Rahotu and Coastal Rugby clubs throughout his early childhood rugby, while he also represented Francis Douglas Memorial College in New Plymouth, alongside All Black teammate Liam Coltman, where he excelled in its first XV.

Barrett came to the attention of national selectors at the age of 19, after he was selected in the New Zealand Sevens team for the final two legs of the 2010 IRB Sevens World Series in England and Scotland and debuted for Taranaki in the ITM Cup against Northland.

== Professional career ==
=== Early career ===
Barrett made his debut for Taranaki in the 2010 ITM Cup competition, coming on as a replacement against Northland. The 19-year-old had made a huge impression in his opening season for the province, especially in his ability to attack the line and create space which saw him named most promising player of the year. Barrett soon enough caught the eyes of coaches, after a solid performance against Manawatu. Coming off the bench to score a 65-metre solo try that secured his side a bonus point win with 10 minutes to play. Barrett's try, his third of the season, helped Taranaki to their eighth win of the season, maintaining their position in the top four.

With his season over with Taranaki, it left Barrett with tough decisions to make on his Super Rugby future. Weighing up whether to take up a wider training group contract with the Hurricanes or look at other offers, including one from the Blues. Barrett decided to opt with the Hurricanes to become a Hurricanes wider squad member in 2011 after turning down the offer from the Blues. He was called up by the Hurricanes before the side's 2011 tour to South Africa where he saw time off the bench, earning his first four Hurricanes caps. He made his debut in a 50–47 win over the Cheetahs in Bloemfontein, a match that saw the Hurricanes prevail on full-time with a try to lock Jeremy Thrush that Barrett converted.

In his second season with the Taranaki squad for the 2011 ITM Cup, Barrett scored 90 points for the season, including an ITM Cup record after he kicked nine penalties in a 39–33 win over Bay of Plenty. With Barrett playing, Taranaki finished a respectable third placing in the ITM Cup and was instrumental in securing his side the Ranfurly Shield off Southland. Barrett was crowned Taranaki best back of the year for his efforts.

=== 2012–13 ===
In 2012, Barrett began with his first Super Rugby match-day start with the Hurricanes against the Stormers. He produced a man of the match performance during a 39–26 loss. Barrett lead effectively with two try assists, one for second five Tim Bateman and another for reserve hooker Motu Matu'u that was later disallowed by the television match official. He scored one himself and landed all of his six attempts at goal. Barrett also celebrated a record-setting display of goal kicking during the Hurricanes' 66–24 win over the Melbourne Rebels. It saw his 21 points break several franchise records previously held by Jon Preston, including his 1997 mark of 152 points for the season. He landed all nine of his conversion attempts, eclipsing the previous mark of six shared by Christian Cullen, Willie Ripia and Jimmy Gopperth. It was only the second time the Hurricanes have scored nine tries in a match and their total of 66 bettered the 64 scored against Northern Transvaal in 1997.

In June 2012, Barrett was named in the All Blacks squad for the Irish tour of New Zealand. Barrett's Test debut was a memorable one; the first five-eighth coming off the bench after 24 minutes and helping the All Blacks contribute 9 points to a record 60–0 win over the Irish. He went on to play five Tests in 2012.

Due to his international duties, Barrett appeared only four times in 2012 for Taranaki, recording a respectable 60 points. He began the season with a win over Bay of Plenty, whilst scoring a 70-metre intercept try and converting all his goals. Barrett was then released from New Zealand national coach Steve Hansen to start in his first run-on against Wellington since Taranaki's successful Ranfurly Shield defence against Tasman on 1 September. He also featured in 2012 rugby semifinals, when Taranaki took on Canterbury. The match had to go into extra-time after a 27-all draw at full time.

In 2013, Barrett represented the Hurricanes in his third Super Rugby campaign and finished with 186 points for the year. He found his best form of the season playing majority in the number 10 position but was switched to fullback now and then throughout the season after he showed his versatility for the Hurricanes in the position that year. With his international commitments, Barrett was kept from running out for Taranaki. Although he did feature at the launch of the side's 2013 alternative rugby jersey revealing.

Barrett returned to international rugby in 2013, being named in the All Blacks squad for the French tour of New Zealand. Barrett was a key player, playing in the historic 30–0 victory over France, scoring his first test try, which was subsequently voted International Rugby Players' Association's Try of the Year for 2013.

=== 2014–15 ===
Barrett ended speculation concerning his future by signing a two-year contract extension with the Hurricanes in 2014. The then 23-year-old only signed a 12-month deal the previous year after reportedly almost joining the Blues. Along with Julian Savea, he started all sixteen matches for the Hurricanes and by early April, in the 2014 Super Rugby season, Barrett had already scored 100 points. He finished the season scoring 209 points.

In June 2014, Barrett featured in all of the three Tests against England starting on the bench, in the mid-year Test series. He played in the opening 2 Bledisloe Cup Test games against Australia starting from the bench in August.

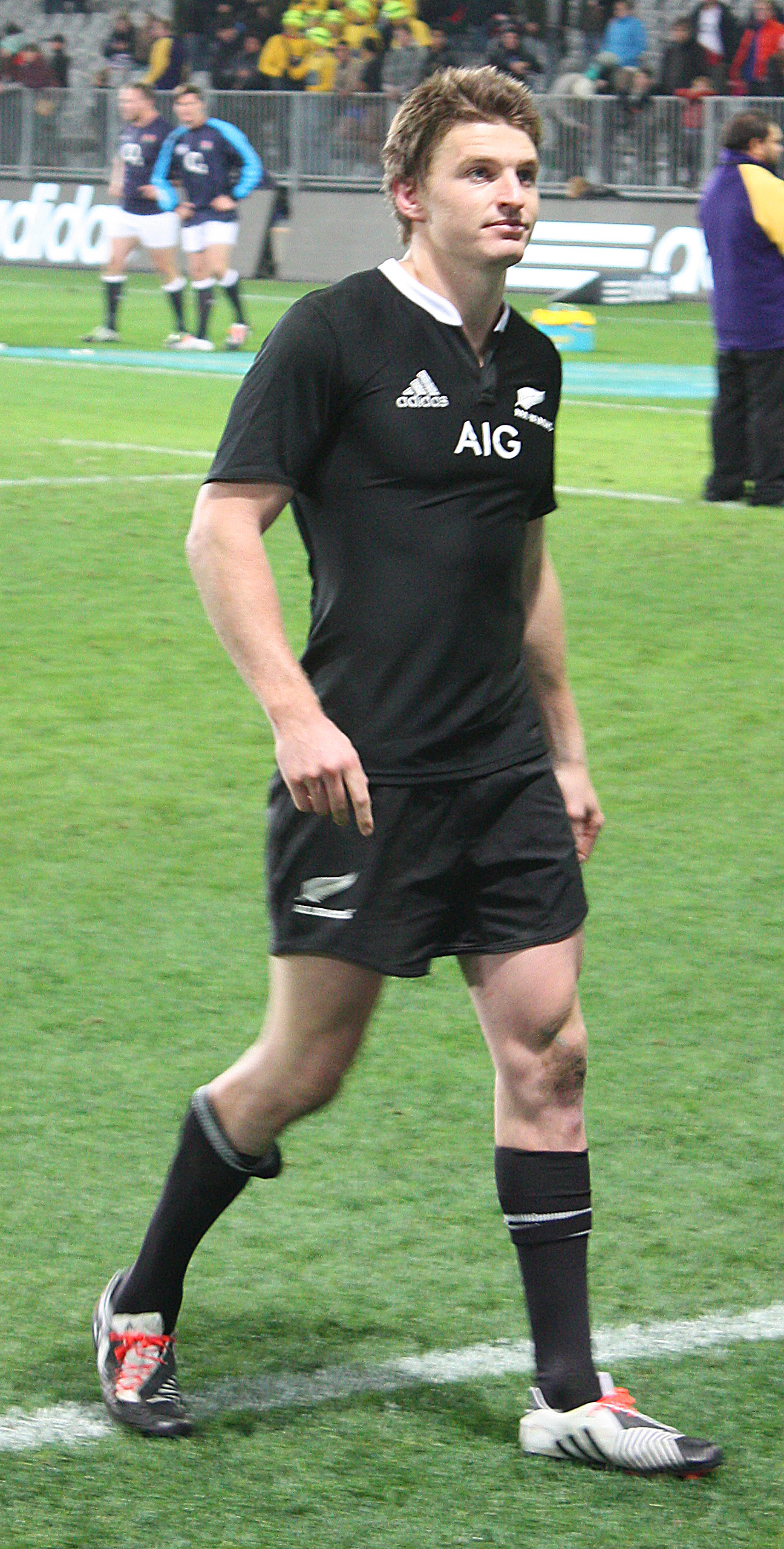
Barrett post the England test in Dunedin, June 2014.

In September 2014, Barrett got the opportunity to start in the All Blacks No. 10 jersey for the first time in his career. He played against Argentina at McLean Park in Napier following an injury to Aaron Cruden. Despite having a tough night with his goal-kicking, succeeding with only one from five attempts, he produced a strong 55-minute performance and were involved in setting up the team's three tries. He was then subbed-off by Colin Slade in the 55th minute. The following week, he was benched for the home-game clash against South Africa and came on to replace Aaron Cruden in the 58th minute of the All Blacks' 14–10 win over South Africa, kicking a successful penalty goal.

Following Cruden's boozy night out and off-field drama, Barrett got more opportunity to start in the All Blacks No. 10 (Fly Half) role, starting for the last two Tests of the Rugby Championship. He guided the All Blacks to a third straight Rugby Championship Title in the All Blacks' 34–13 win over Argentina in La Plata and then featured in the 25–27 loss to South Africa in Johannesburg. He finished the Rugby Championship with 30 points (6 conversion goals and 6 penalty goals) as 5th highest point-scorer (behind teammate Aaron Cruden with 37 points).

On 18 October 2014, despite Cruden returning to the team squad for the third Bledisloe Cup match in Brisbane, coach Steve Hansen selected Barrett to start at No. 10 for the team's clash against the Wallabies. He played for 72 minutes, kicking 3 goals from 4 attempts and produced a strong performance, before being replaced by Colin Slade. The All Blacks won the game 29–28. Barrett was selected for the 2015 Rugby World Cup, starting in one fixture against Namibia, and coming off the bench to cover wing and fullback in the rest.

In 2015, Barrett had a couple of injuries throughout the Hurricanes 2015 season. He first had a frustrating month of rehabilitation for a knee injury suffered against the Crusaders on 2 May after Barrett's scans revealed a grade-two tear of the medial collateral ligament (MCL) in his right knee. He had been ruled out of the Hurricanes' Super Rugby derby match against the Chiefs with a calf strain. Barrett returned to Hurricanes just in time for the 2015 Super Rugby final in which the Highlanders created an upset and heaped heartbreak on the Hurricanes with a 21–14 win in Wellington.

Barrett returned to Taranaki in 2015, after missing the 2013 and 2014 seasons for the province after featuring at first five-eighth against Otago in round three of the competition. His performance did not go unnoticed after a break, from set play, saw him break the Otago line with ease, and speed, to find wing Jackson Ormond in support to take his pass for the opening try in the 12th minute. With three minutes left in the first half, he sized up his options perfectly again to slip a kick across field where right wing Codey Rei was waiting in clear space to secure the ball and score.

All Black Head Coach, Steve Hansen, selected Barrett for the 2015 Rugby World Cup. Barrett started in one fixture against Namibia, and coming off the bench to cover wing and fullback in the rest. On 31 October 2015, Barrett scored the final try in the 2015 Rugby World Cup final match against Australia, having been substituted on for the injured Nehe Milner-Skudder. Dan Carter converted his try to make the final score 34–17.

=== 2016–17 ===
In 2016, Barrett scored the most individual points that season with 223, in addition he was the only player in the 2016 Super Rugby season to surpass 200 points. He was named man of the match in the Super Rugby final, scoring 15 points as the Hurricanes beat the Lions 20–3 to win their first title.

During the Wales tour to New Zealand, Barrett came off the bench in the second test after Aaron Cruden was injured, he scored 11 points in the second test which New Zealand won 36–22. Barrett started in the final test against Wales; he was praised heavily for his 26-point haul in a 46-6 demolition of a tired Wales side.

Due to his superb form for the Hurricanes and against Wales during their tour; Barrett supplanted an injury-plagued Aaron Cruden at fly-half for the 2016 Rugby Championship. He seemed to cement his position as New Zealand's first choice fly-half as New Zealand beat Australia by a record 42–8, away; he followed this with another 29–9 victory over Australia in round 2. Barrett only seemed to get better as the Rugby Championship continued as New Zealand comfortably beat Argentina 57-22 and South Africa 41–13, winning the Championship with two rounds to spare. Barrett finished as the highest point scorer of the tournament, scoring 81 points across the 6 matches played. Barrett supplanted Aaron Cruden as New Zealand's first-choice by the end of the competition and carried on being a regular starter in the end of year tour.

Barrett managed to convert his brother Scott Barrett's first test try in the All Blacks' 40–29 loss against Ireland in November, after Scott scored on debut.

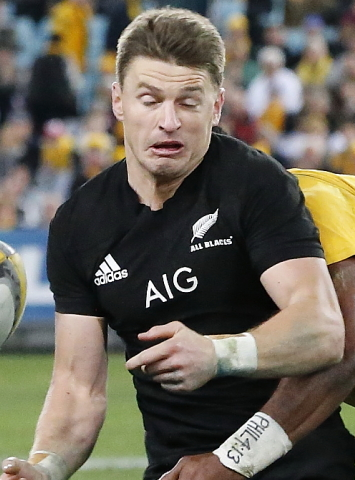
Barrett tackled during the first Bledisloe Cup test against Australia, August 2017.

Barrett won the award for World Rugby Player of the Year, later in the year, beating teammate Dane Coles to the award and becoming the next All Blacks player after Dan Carter to win that award. Barrett's 95-metre individual try against France in New Zealand's final match for the year saw Barrett overtake Ben Smith as the second to highest try scorer in the All Blacks for the year, scoring 9 tries throughout the calendar year, having doubled his career total. Barrett finished behind winger Israel Dagg, who scored 10 tries that year.

Barrett played in most Hurricanes fixtures, during the 2017 Super Rugby season, but lent his kicking duties to younger brother, Jordie Barrett, during the season due to a leg problem. Despite this, Barrett still scored 58 points in the season. Barrett's discipline was also notably off, with Barrett ending the season as the most-carded player of the year. Barrett received four yellow cards, as well as a red card during the season. Barrett earned this red card, which was the first of his career, for being awarded two yellow cards against the Waratahs, having performed a deliberate knock-down and an offside against the Waratahs.

Barrett was selected for the All Blacks' 33-man squad to face Manu Samoa and the British and Irish Lions in 2017. His brothers Scott and fellow Hurricane Jordie were selected too. This meant the Barrett family were the first to have three siblings selected for the same All Blacks squad. Barrett scored 24 points including two tries in his 50th test match, against Samoa, on 16 June 2017, which was also his brother Jordie's debut. Although Beauden and Jordie were not on the pitch at the same time, Scott shared game time with both of them.

Barrett went on to score 41 points in the three tests against the British and Irish Lions, being the highest points scorer of the series. The All Blacks drew the series with the Lions, with Barrett missing three of his ten kicks during the second test of the series.

Barrett was retained as a regular starter for the 2017 Rugby Championship, despite calls from the public to replace Barrett with outstanding Highlanders first-five Lima Sopoaga. Barrett was named as the All Black Vice-Captain, for the rest of 2017, replacing Ben Smith who took a sabbatical leave. In the final match of the Rugby Championship against South Africa, Barrett was subbed off after only 33 minutes for a concussion test, being replaced by Lima Sopoaga. The All Blacks went on to win 25–24 after Barrett failed to make it back on the field.

Barrett returned from concussion to captain the All Blacks for the first time, in a non-cap match over the Barbarians on 4 November, which the All Blacks won 31-22 (Barrett slotting 3 conversions). Barrett started in all three tests on the end-of-year tour, scoring the winning try against Scotland in a tense 22–17 win.

Barrett was awarded World Rugby Player of the Year for the second time in 2017, beating team-mate Rieko Ioane to the award, joining former team-mates Richie McCaw and Dan Carter to become the third player to win the award on more than one occasion, as well as becoming only the second player to win the award twice in successive years. Barrett also scored the second-to-most tries of any All Black in 2017, tying with Waisake Naholo and scoring six tries in 2017. Ioane was the only All Black to score more than Barrett, scoring 10 tries in 2017.

=== 2018 ===
On 10 March 2018, Barrett as well as his Hurricanes team-mate Ben May, played their 100th game for the Hurricanes, in Round 4, against the Crusaders. The Hurricanes won the match 29–19, with Barrett lasting the full 80 minutes. Barrett finished the Super Rugby season with 117 points, including five tries.

Barrett scored the first All Black try of 2018, but he had limited participation in the three-test 2018 Steinlager series against France, due to injury. On 16 June 2018, Barrett was replaced by Damian McKenzie only 12 minutes into the test. Barrett was taken off the field for a concussion test, which he failed, due to a mid-air clash with French fullback Benjamin Fall. Fall was controversially red-carded, by referee Angus Gardner, for causing Barrett's dangerous landing, although Fall was later cleared and was not suspended for doing so. Barrett did not play in the third test of the series, with the All Blacks going on to win all three tests.

The 2018 Rugby Championship was somewhat of a mixed competition for Barrett. He was the second-to-highest point scorer in the Rugby Championship, with 61 points. This included five tries, bringing Barrett's career try tally to 30 tries, a major career milestone. Four of the tries Barrett scored in the competition, were all in one test, on 25 August 2018, against the Wallabies. Barrett became the first All Black to score four tries in a test since his former team-mate Zac Guildford scored four against Canada in 2011. Barrett also won Man of the Match for that performance, becoming the first player to ever score more than three tries against the Wallabies, scoring 30 points in the process. Barrett was deemed to have silenced critics who wanted him replaced by Crusaders first-five and new All Black, Richie Mo'unga, but also arguably cost the All Blacks a win with his follow-up performance.

On 15 September 2018, in his following performance, Barrett managed to kick only two of the six goals he attempted against South Africa. The All Blacks then narrowly lost to South Africa, by 34–36. Had Barrett kicked two more of his goals, the All Blacks could have won by two points. Barrett's performance against South Africa was answered by the All Black selectors, with Mo'unga chosen over Damian McKenzie as Barrett's back-up off the bench. Barrett performed well in the last round of the competition, when he was moved to fullback, after Richie Mo'unga replaced winger Waisake Naholo. Barrett, Mo'unga and Hurricanes loose forward, Ardie Savea, had a commanding teamwork in the last 20 minutes, allowing the All Blacks to beat South Africa 32–30.

Barrett's 2018 end-of-year tour saw him surpass Dan Carter as the most prolific try-scorer to ever play at first-five, as he scored the 31st of his career in the third Bledisloe Cup test, against the Wallabies, off a pass from Rieko Ioane, during a 37–20 win.

After being rested and missing out on a test against Japan, Barrett was retained in the starting lineup for the test against England, on 10 November 2018, after New Zealand went for four years without playing England. With Richie Mo'unga on the bench, and Damian McKenzie at fullback, Barrett was one of three first-fives fielded by New Zealand on the day. Barrett's performance against England also saw him kick the first drop-goal of his professional career, in the 46th minute, answering the ongoing criticism for his goal-kicking. Barrett's performance made a big contribution to the final score, 16–15, a win for New Zealand. However, Barrett did concede what could have been the match-winning try to England. England's then third-choice openside flanker, Sam Underhill, outran Barrett to score what would have been a try. Underhill's try was ruled out due to an offside charge down from replacement forward, Courtney Lawes, which left Barrett's 100% kicking percentage as the way New Zealand won the test.

The week following the England test, Barrett also kicked a drop goal against Ireland in an ill-fated loss, 9–16. Barrett was New Zealand's only point-scorer in the loss, also kicking two penalty goals. Barrett was subbed off in the final test of the year, against Italy, scoring a 15-point haul during the 66–3 win.

=== 2019 ===
Following the 2019 Super Rugby season, Barrett re-signed with New Zealand Rugby through to 2023, also announcing that he would be switching Super Rugby clubs, from the Hurricanes, to the Auckland-based Blues. Barrett finished his career with the Hurricanes as their all-time leading points-scorer, with 1238 points, also finishing as the fourth-to-most capped Hurricane of all time, behind Conrad Smith, Ma'a Nonu and current All Blacks teammate, TJ Perenara.

In the All Black's 2019 Rugby Championship campaign, Barrett started one game at first five and two games at fullback. Even after partially handing over the kicking duties to Richie Mo'unga, Barrett was able to score a total of 20 points across the All Black's 3 games, making him the All Black's top point scorer (10 points vs Argentina, 5 points vs South Africa, and 5 points vs Australia.

After continued poor performances by Ben Smith and Rieko Ioane, Barrett started his third consecutive test at fullback, against Australia during the second Bledisloe Cup test of 2019. The 36–0 win was also a success for Barrett's partnership with Richie Mo'unga, the new regular at first-five, with Mo'unga having overtaken Barrett as the first-choice.

All Blacks Head Coach, Steve Hansen named Barrett in New Zealand's 31-man squad for the 2019 Rugby World Cup on 28 August 2019, with the competition set to be Barrett's second World Cup. Barrett went on to play in five tests during the competition, although it ended in disappointment for New Zealand, who finished in third place.

=== 2020 ===
In a season disrupted by COVID-19, Barrett played for the Blues in the 2020 Super Rugby season until it was suspended and in the subsequent 2020 Super Rugby Aotearoa season.

On the 5 November 2020, Barrett represented the North Island in the 2020 North vs South rugby union match.

In October and November, the All Blacks played six tests and Barrett appeared in five of them, three against Australia and two against Argentina. He started as first five-eighth in the last test against Australia but in the other four tests he started at Fullback. He did not score any tries or points, with Richie Mo'unga and younger brother Jordie Barrett attended to goal kicking duties.

=== 2021 ===
In 2021, Barrett had a sabbatical in Japan with Top League club Suntory Sungoliath so he did not appear for the Blues in the 2021 Super Rugby Aotearoa or Super Rugby Trans-Tasman.

Barrett returned for the international season and on 30 October 2021, he played his 100th test match, in the fixture against Wales at Principality Stadium in Cardiff. During the milestone game, he scored two tries in a man-of-the-match performance.

=== 2022 ===
In 2022, Barrett had a great Super Rugby Season with the Blues as he guided the side to the Grand Final, which they unfortunately lose to the Crusaders.

Following the 2022 Super Rugby Pacific season, he began the International Test year starting at First-Five in the All Blacks 42–19 win over Ireland at Eden Park with Richie Mo'unga on the bench. Following the 3-test series loss to Ireland and the opening Rugby Championship loss to South Africa in Mbombela, Barrett was benched with Richie Mo'unga starting at 10 in the All Blacks win over South Africa in the 2nd Test and during the All Blacks' 2 wins against Argentina in Hamilton and against Australia in the opening Bledisloe Cup Test in Melbourne. With injuries to Quinn Tupaea and David Havili in the First Bledisloe Cup Test, coach Ian Foster reshuffle the backline by shifting Barrett at Fullback with younger brother Jordie Barrett moving to the midfield at Second Five for the 2nd Bledisloe Cup Test in Auckland which was the team's best winning performance of the year, winning the game 40–14 at Eden Park.

Following the Rugby Championship, Barrett remained at Fullback on the Northern Tour in the All Blacks' 55–23 win over Wales and the 25-all draw against England despite only playing one game at First Five in the All Blacks' 31–22 win over Scotland.

=== 2023 ===
In 2023, Barrett featured in the 2023 Super Rugby Season with the Blues. He signed a short-term contract with Toyota Verblitz in February to play in Japan after the 2023 Rugby World Cup.

Following the Super Rugby Season, Barrett began the International Test Season starting at Fullback in the All Blacks' Rugby Championship wins over Argentina, South Africa and Australia, as the All Blacks retained the Rugby Championship Title.

Barrett was named in New Zealand's 2023 Rugby World Cup Squad. During the World Cup, he featured in every game starting at Fullback but only playing 1 game off the bench against Uruguay. In the World Cup Final against South Africa, Barrett and his younger brothers Jordie Barrett and Scott Barrett became the first three siblings to featured in a RWC Final together by beginning the grand final match in the starting XV.

During the RWC Final as the All Blacks loss narrowly by one point to South Africa, Barrett scored the only try of the game which was his 43rd career test try while becoming the first player to score a try in two separate Rugby World Cup Grand Finals having scored a try in the 2015 RWC Final and then 8 years later in the 2023 Rugby World Cup final.

Following the 2023 Rugby World Cup and despite signing a short-term contract with Toyota Verblitz for the 2023-24 Japan Top League Season earlier in the year, Barrett resign with New Zealand Rugby through to 2027 as he will return to the Blues for the 2025 Super Rugby Season.

=== 2024 ===
In 2024, Barrett didn't feature in the 2024 Super Rugby Pacific season with the Blues as he took a break from the Super Rugby Season by playing in the Japanese Rugby Top League with Toyota Verblitz.

Following his time in Japan, Barrett returned to New Zealand Rugby ahead of the International Test Season with the All Blacks under new coach Scott Robertson.

In the opening 2 home tests of the year against England, Barrett produce an outstanding impact performance coming off the bench to help guide the All Blacks to winning both games and then starting at Fullback for the San Diego Test match against Fiji which the All Blacks won 47–5. He went on to featured in 5 of the 6 tests games during the 2024 Rugby Championship, starting 3 games at Fullback and only featured one game from the bench in the 12–18 loss to South Africa despite not playing in the Sydney as he was a late withdrawal from the first Bledisloe Cup Test. Barrett finally got his opportunity to start at First Five for the second Bledisloe Cup match in the All Blacks' 33–13 win over Australia in Wellington and on the Northern Hemisphere Tour with Will Jordan featuring at Fullback and Damian McKenzie on the bench.

=== 2025–2026 ===
In 2025, Barrett returned to Super Rugby with the Blues, featuring in 14 games despite missing all of the 2024 season due to a playing sabbatical in Japan. He went on featuring in the international season with the All Blacks playing mainly at first five in 10 of the 13 test appearance.

Following Scott Robertson's departure from New Zealand Rugby and with Dave Rennie taking over the All Blacks head coaching role, Barrett had an inconsistent Super Rugby Season with the Blues in 2026 as he did not feature in the opening home tests of the year. Barrett had to wait for his opportunity until the fourth test against South Africa where he began the game from the bench and scored a try late in the game during the 28–43 loss at M&T Bank Stadium in Baltimore.

With injuries to Ruben Love and Richie Mo'unga ahead of the Bledisloe Cup two-tests games, Barrett was selected in the starting XV to start at fullback in the first Bledisloe test match at Eden Park, with Damian McKenzie featuring at first five. Barrett produced an outstanding performance in the two Bledisloe Cup test appearances over Australia as he scored two tries in the second trans-Tasman test in Sydney bringing him a total of 48 career test tries with one try away behind Doug Howlett's record of 49 tries.

On 7 November 2026, Barrett became the All Blacks' second most-capped test player as he played his 148th test and equaled former teammate Richie McCaw's test appearances. He also broke Doug Howlett's try-scoring record of 49 tries in becoming the All Blacks' second highest try-scorer behind teammate Will Jordan. He scored two tries in the All Blacks' 43–21 win over Scotland during the 2026 Nations Championship match, as he crossed the tryline for his 49th and 50th All Black career tries during the game on the Northern Tour.

On 14 November 2026, Barrett played his 149th test as he moved past Richie McCaw's test appearance of 148 caps along with captaining the All Blacks for the first time in a 35–28 defeat to Wales at Principality Stadium in Cardiff.

== Personal life ==
Barrett proposed to his long-time partner Hannah Laity in 2018 and they married the following year in a private ceremony on Rakino Island. Together, they have three daughters.

== Career statistics ==
=== Club summary ===
| Club | Season | Competition | Apps | Try | Con | Pen | Drop | Points | Yel | Red |
|---|---|---|---|---|---|---|---|---|---|---|
| Taranaki | 2010 | ITM Cup | 13 | 3 | 7 | 4 | 0 | 41 | 0 | 0 |
| Taranaki | 2011 | ITM Cup | 8 | 0 | 9 | 24 | 0 | 90 | 0 | 0 |
| Taranaki | 2012 | ITM Cup | 4 | 2 | 10 | 10 | 0 | 60 | 0 | 0 |
| Taranaki | 2015 | ITM Cup | 1 | 0 | 0 | 0 | 0 | 0 | 0 | 0 |
| Taranaki | 2020 | Mitre 10 Cup | 2 | 0 | 0 | 0 | 0 | 0 | 0 | 0 |
| Taranaki | 2026 | Hilux NPC | 1 | 0 | 0 | 0 | 0 | 0 | 0 | 0 |
| Taranaki | Total | | 29 | 5 | 26 | 38 | 0 | 191 | 0 | 0 |
| Hurricanes | 2011 | Super Rugby | 4 | 0 | 1 | 0 | 0 | 2 | 0 | 0 |
| Hurricanes | 2012 | Super Rugby | 16 | 2 | 35 | 39 | 0 | 197 | 0 | 0 |
| Hurricanes | 2013 | Super Rugby | 16 | 2 | 28 | 40 | 0 | 186 | 0 | 0 |
| Hurricanes | 2014 | Super Rugby | 16 | 5 | 32 | 40 | 0 | 209 | 0 | 0 |
| Hurricanes | 2015 | Super Rugby | 12 | 3 | 17 | 24 | 0 | 121 | 0 | 0 |
| Hurricanes | 2016 | Super Rugby | 18 | 9 | 50 | 25 | 1 | 223 | 1 | 0 |
| Hurricanes | 2017 | Super Rugby | 15 | 4 | 17 | 2 | 0 | 60 | 3 | 1 |
| Hurricanes | 2018 | Super Rugby | 16 | 6 | 34 | 8 | 0 | 122 | 0 | 0 |
| Hurricanes | 2019 | Super Rugby | 12 | 3 | 35 | 11 | 0 | 118 | 0 | 0 |
| Hurricanes | Total | | 125 | 34 | 249 | 189 | 1 | 1,238 | 4 | 1 |
| Blues | 2020 | Super Rugby Aotearoa | 7 | 1 | 6 | 2 | 1 | 26 | 0 | 0 |
| Blues | 2022 | Super Rugby Pacific | 11 | 5 | 9 | 4 | 1 | 58 | 0 | 0 |
| Blues | 2023 | Super Rugby Pacific | 12 | 3 | 32 | 12 | 0 | 115 | 0 | 0 |
| Blues | 2025 | Super Rugby Pacific | 14 | 3 | 35 | 9 | 0 | 112 | 0 | 0 |
| Blues | 2026 | Super Rugby Pacific | 11 | 1 | 32 | 4 | 0 | 81 | 0 | 0 |
| Blues | Total | | 55 | 13 | 114 | 31 | 2 | 392 | 0 | 0 |
| Suntory Sungoliath | 2021 | Top League | 10 | 7 | 44 | 14 | 1 | 168 | 0 | 0 |
| Suntory Sungoliath | Total | | 10 | 7 | 44 | 14 | 1 | 168 | 0 | 0 |
| Toyota Verblitz | 2023–24 | Japan Rugby League One | 13 | 2 | 38 | 7 | 0 | 107 | 0 | 0 |
| Toyota Verblitz | Total | | 13 | 2 | 38 | 7 | 0 | 107 | 0 | 0 |
| Career total | | | 232 | 61 | 471 | 279 | 4 | 2,096 | 4 | 1 |

As of match played 28 July 2026

=== List of international tries ===
| No. | Date | Venue | Opponent | Score | Result | Competition |
|---|---|---|---|---|---|---|
| 1 | 15 June 2013 | AMI Stadium, Christchurch, New Zealand | France | 28–0 | 30–0 | Test match |
| 2 | 22 June 2013 | Yarrow Stadium, New Plymouth, New Zealand | France | 22–9 | 24–9 | Test match |
| 3 | 5 October 2013 | Emirates Airline Park, Johannesburg, South Africa | South Africa | 29–27 | 38–27 | 2013 Rugby Championship |
| 4 | 2 November 2013 | Prince Chichibu Memorial Stadium, Tokyo, Japan | Japan | 45–6 | 54–6 | Test match |
| 5 | 22 November 2014 | Millennium Stadium, Cardiff, Wales | Wales | 20–16 | 34–16 | Test match |
| 6 | 22 November 2014 | Millennium Stadium, Cardiff, Wales | Wales | 34–16 | 34–16 | Test match |
| 7 | 24 September 2015 | London Stadium, London, England | Namibia | 27–6 | 58–14 | 2015 Rugby World Cup |
| 8 | 24 October 2015 | Twickenham Stadium, London, England | South Africa | 15–12 | 20–18 | 2015 Rugby World Cup |
| 9 | 31 October 2015 | Twickenham Stadium, London, England | Australia | 32–17 | 34–17 | 2015 Rugby World Cup |
| 10 | 18 June 2016 | Westpac Stadium, Wellington, New Zealand | Wales | 22–10 | 36–22 | Test match |
| 11 | 25 June 2016 | Forsyth Barr Stadium, Dunedin, New Zealand | Wales | 23–6 | 46–6 | Test match |
| 12 | 25 June 2016 | Forsyth Barr Stadium, Dunedin, New Zealand | Wales | 30–6 | 46–6 | Test match |
| 13 | 20 August 2016 | ANZ Stadium, Sydney, Australia | Australia | 18–3 | 42–8 | 2016 Rugby Championship |
| 14 | 10 September 2016 | FMG Stadium Waikato, Hamilton, New Zealand | Argentina | 22–16 | 57–22 | 2016 Rugby Championship |
| 15 | 8 October 2016 | Growthpoint Kings Park, Durban, South Africa | South Africa | 22–12 | 57–15 | 2016 Rugby Championship |
| 16 | 8 October 2016 | Growthpoint Kings Park, Durban, South Africa | South Africa | 34–15 | 57–15 | 2016 Rugby Championship |
| 17 | 19 November 2016 | Aviva Stadium, Dublin, Ireland | Ireland | 12–3 | 21–9 | Test match |
| 18 | 26 November 2016 | Stade de France, Paris, France | France | 15–6 | 24–19 | Test match |
| 19 | 16 June 2017 | Eden Park, Auckland, New Zealand | Samoa | 12–0 | 78–0 | Test match |
| 20 | 16 June 2017 | Eden Park, Auckland, New Zealand | Samoa | 45–0 | 78–0 | Test match |
| 21 | 26 August 2017 | Forsyth Barr Stadium, Dunedin, New Zealand | Australia | 19–17 | 35–29 | 2017 Rugby Championship |
| 22 | 26 August 2017 | Forsyth Barr Stadium, Dunedin, New Zealand | Australia | 33–29 | 35–29 | 2017 Rugby Championship |
| 23 | 9 September 2017 | Yarrow Stadium, New Plymouth, New Zealand | Argentina | 37–22 | 39–22 | 2017 Rugby Championship |
| 24 | 18 November 2017 | Murrayfield Stadium, Edinburgh, Scotland | Scotland | 20–10 | 22–17 | Test match |
| 25 | 9 June 2018 | Eden Park, Auckland, New Zealand | France | 8–8 | 52–11 | Test match |
| 26 | 18 August 2018 | ANZ Stadium, Sydney, Australia | Australia | 17–6 | 38–13 | 2018 Rugby Championship |
| 27 | 25 August 2018 | Eden Park, Auckland, New Zealand | Australia | 5–0 | 40–12 | 2018 Rugby Championship |
| 28 | 25 August 2018 | Eden Park, Auckland, New Zealand | Australia | 12–7 | 40–12 | 2018 Rugby Championship |
| 29 | 25 August 2018 | Eden Park, Auckland, New Zealand | Australia | 33–12 | 40–12 | 2018 Rugby Championship |
| 30 | 25 August 2018 | Eden Park, Auckland, New Zealand | Australia | 40–12 | 40–12 | 2018 Rugby Championship |
| 31 | 27 October 2018 | Nissan Stadium, Yokohama, Japan | Australia | 25–13 | 37–20 | Test match |
| 32 | 24 November 2018 | Stadio Olimpico, Rome, Italy | Italy | 43–3 | 66–3 | Test match |
| 33 | 10 August 2019 | Optus Stadium, Perth, Australia | Australia | 17–26 | 26–47 | 2019 Rugby Championship |
| 34 | 2 October 2019 | Ōita Bank Dome, Ōita, Japan | Canada | 26–0 | 63–0 | 2019 Rugby World Cup |
| 35 | 19 October 2019 | Tokyo Stadium, Tokyo, Japan | Ireland | 22–0 | 46–14 | 2019 Rugby World Cup |
| 36 | 1 November 2019 | Tokyo Stadium, Tokyo, Japan | Wales | 12–0 | 40–17 | 2019 Rugby World Cup |
| 37 | 23 October 2021 | FedExField, Washington, D.C., United States | United States | 83–14 | 104–14 | Test match |
| 38 | 31 October 2021 | Principality Stadium, Cardiff, Wales | Wales | 5–0 | 54–16 | Test match |
| 39 | 31 October 2021 | Principality Stadium, Cardiff, Wales | Wales | 54–16 | 54–16 | Test match |
| 40 | 9 July 2022 | Forsyth Barr Stadium, Dunedin, New Zealand | Ireland | 5–10 | 12–23 | Test match |
| 41 | 3 September 2022 | FMG Stadium Waikato, Hamilton, New Zealand | Argentina | 51–3 | 53–3 | 2022 Rugby Championship |
| 42 | 8 July 2023 | Estadio Malvinas Argentinas, Mendoza, Argentina | Argentina | 36–5 | 41–12 | 2023 Rugby Championship |
| 43 | 28 October 2023 | Stade de France, Saint-Denis, France | South Africa | 6–12 | 11–12 | 2023 Rugby World Cup |
| 44 | 17 August 2024 | Eden Park, Auckland, New Zealand | Argentina | 33–3 | 42–10 | 2024 Rugby Championship |
| 45 | 23 November 2024 | Allianz Stadium, Turin, Italy | Italy | 17–6 | 29–11 | Test match |
| 46 | 12 September 2026 | M&T Bank Stadium, Baltimore, United States | South Africa | 26-43 | 28-43 | 2026 New Zealand rugby union tour of South Africa |
| 47 | 17 October 2026 | Accor Stadium, Sydney, Australia | Australia | 10-0 | 21-43 | 2026 Bledisloe Cup |
| 48 | 17 October 2026 | Accor Stadium, Sydney, Australia | Australia | 34-7 | 21-43 | 2026 Bledisloe Cup |
| 49 | 7 November 2026 | Murrayfield Stadium, Edinburgh, Scotland | Scotland | 22-14 | 21-43 | 2026 Nations Championship |
| 50 | 7 November 2026 | Murrayfield Stadium, Edinburgh, Scotland | Scotland | 34-21 | 21-43 | 2026 Nations Championship |

As of match played 8 November 2026

== Honours ==
New Zealand

- Rugby World Cup / Webb Ellis Cup
  - Winner: 2015
  - Third-place: 2019
  - Runner-up: 2023
- Tri Nations/The Rugby Championship champion, 2012, 2013, 2014, 2016, 2017, 2018, 2020, 2021, 2022, 2023
- Bledisloe Cup 2013 - 2026
- All Black test centurion
- Most Capped All Blacks Back

Hurricanes

- Super Rugby Winner - 2016
- Super Rugby - Club's Highest Point Scorer (on 1238 points)
- Super Rugby Centurion

Individual

- World Rugby Player of the Year - Winner - 2016, 2017
- World Rugby Player of the Year - Nominee - 2018

Awards
| Preceded by (South Africa) Bryan Habana | IRPA Try of the Year; 2013 | Succeeded by (South Africa) Francois Hougaard |
| Preceded by (New Zealand) Dan Carter | World Rugby Player of the Year; 2016–2017 | Succeeded by (Ireland) Johnny Sexton |
