= Kevin Barrett (rugby union, born 1966) =

- Full name: Kevin Edward Barrett
- Born: 26 February 1966 (age 60)
- Height: 194 cm (6 ft 4 in)
- Weight: 106 kg (234 lb)
- School: Francis Douglas College
- Notable relative(s): Beauden Barrett (son); Jordie Barrett (son); Kane Barrett (son); Scott Barrett (son)
- Occupation: Farmer

Rugby union career
- Position: Flanker / Lock
Provincial / State sides
Years	Team	Apps	(Points)
1986–99	Taranaki	167	(99)
Super Rugby
Years	Team	Apps	(Points)
1997–98	Hurricanes	14	(0)

Kevin Edward Barrett (born 26 February 1966) is a New Zealand former professional rugby union player.

== Biography ==
Raised on the family farm in Pungarehu, Barrett was educated at Francis Douglas College in New Plymouth, which he left in fifth form to work on the farm. He played 167 games as a forward for Taranaki between 1986 and 1999. His nickname "Smiley" was coined at Taranaki from the faint smile he had during the physical on field battles.

Barrett joined the Hurricanes as injury cover in 1997 and made four appearances that season, including as a flanker in their semi-final loss to the Brumbies. In 1998, Barrett was used as a lock and played 10 Super 12 games.

Finishing up in New Zealand rugby in 1999, Barrett moved to County Meath, Ireland, the following year to manage a farm and he played rugby for Athlone-based club Buccaneers during the 2000–01 season.

Barrett once stated "I’m off to breed some All Blacks" when asked in a match programme what he would like to do in the future.

=== Family ===
Barrett raised five sons and three daughters with wife Robyn. Four of his sons have played professional rugby, eldest Kane retired early due to concussion, while Beauden, Jordie and Scott all became All Blacks.
