= Jordie Barrett =

New Zealand rugby union player (born 1997)

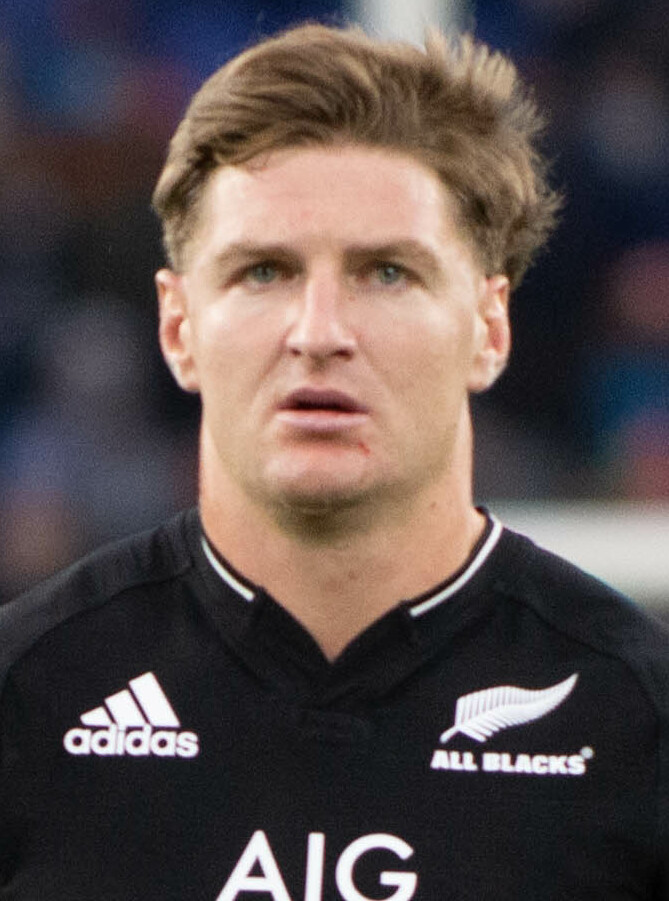
- Barrett representing New Zealand during the 2021 end-of-year rugby union internationals
- Full name: Jordan Matthew Barrett
- Born: 17 February 1997 (age 29) New Plymouth, New Zealand
- Height: 1.96 m (6 ft 5 in)
- Weight: 102 kg (225 lb; 16 st 1 lb)
- School: Francis Douglas Memorial College
- Notable relative(s): Beauden Barrett (brother); Kane Barrett (brother); Scott Barrett (brother)

Rugby union career
- Position(s): Fullback, Fly-half, Wing, Centre
- Current team: Hurricanes
Senior career
Years	Team	Apps	(Points)
2016	Canterbury	12	(123)
2017–	Hurricanes	125	(844)
2020	Taranaki	2	(22)
2024–2025	Leinster	15	(35)
- Correct as of 28 July 2026
International career
Years	Team	Apps	(Points)
2016	New Zealand U20	7	(76)
2017–	New Zealand	88	(304)
- Correct as of 21 November 2026
Medal record
Men's Rugby union
Representing New Zealand
Rugby World Cup
Bronze medal – third place	2019 Japan	Squad
Silver medal – second place	2023 France	Squad

Jordan Matthew Barrett (born 17 February 1997) is a New Zealand-born rugby union player who currently plays as a centre or fullback for New Zealand side the Hurricanes in Super Rugby. He represents New Zealand internationally.

He previously played for Canterbury and Taranaki in the National Provincial Championship, as well as Leinster in the United Rugby Championship.

== Early life ==
Born and raised in a rugby household, his older brothers Beauden, Scott and Kane also went on to become professional rugby players. His father Kevin 'Smiley' Barrett was an uncompromising loose forward for Taranaki, playing 167 games for the amber and blacks. Jordie played in the Canterbury Metro senior rugby tournament for Lincoln University. He also represented his school, Francis Douglas Memorial College just like his brothers before him.

Barrett was a member of the New Zealand Under 20 team which participated in the 2016 World Rugby Under 20 Championship in England where he made 3 appearances in total scoring 52 points including one try. He played for the New Zealand under-20 side in May 2016 in the Oceania Championship on the Gold Coast against Australia.

== Rugby career ==
=== 2016–17 ===
Barrett signed with Canterbury for their 2016 Mitre 10 Cup campaign. He made his debut coming off the bench, but found himself making the starting match-day 23 throughout the year. Barrett began to impress, following up a solid showing against Tasman in just his second game at provincial level. A 25-point haul was his reward for a quality performance. Overall Barrett gained 12 appearances for the side and scored 123 points, as well as winning the side's eighth Mitre 10 Cup title after their 43–27 victory over the Tasman in the 2016 grand final and also retaining the Ranfurly Shield. After his stand-out year, he featured at the New Zealand Rugby Awards, winning the age grade and Mitre 10 Cup player of the year.

In September 2016, Barrett signed a two-year deal with the Hurricanes in Super Rugby. He made his debut starting at fullback against the Sunwolves. Barrett became a regular starter following the injury of teammate Nehe Milner-Skudder, which saw him produce one of rugby's great burglaries after he scored the Hurricanes second try in their Super Rugby clash against the Stormers. A grubber-kick into the Stormers goal area, saw Nizaam Carr getting to the ball first, as Barrett challenged him and planted it down, just inside the dead ball line. After being selected for New Zealand and continuing his form for the Hurricanes, Barrett was released to play against the British & Irish Lions midweek match. Featuring at fullback, Barrett was a part of a draw against the touring team. He ended with a try assist after a pass to Ngani Laumape to score and kicked nine points.

In October 2016, he was included in the All Blacks side for the 2016 Autumn Internationals as an apprentice. Whilst an apprentice in the New Zealand national team during their northern hemisphere tour, Barrett signed with Taranaki for 2017. Later that year, Barrett had a cameo appearance for the province.

In June 2017, Barrett was one of three uncapped backs named in the All Blacks' 33-man squad for the Pasifika Challenge against Samoa and the three-test series against the touring British & Irish Lions 2017 team, along with brothers Beauden and Scott. In what was brother Beauden's 50th test, Barrett made his international debut in the 78–0 against Samoa on 16 June 2017, replacing All Blacks captain Ben Smith in the 63rd minute. Barrett was one of two debutants that day, with Hurricanes team-mate Vaea Fifita replacing veteran loose forward Jerome Kaino off the bench. Barrett played well and helped set up Hurricanes team-mate Ardie Savea for his second try. After Blues winger Rieko Ioane fell ill and with injuries to Ben Smith and winger Waisake Naholo, Barrett started at fullback in the third test against the Lions and scored his first international try in the first half following a pass from Anton Lienert-Brown. Barrett also set up Hurricanes teammate Ngani Laumape for the opening try. Barrett played the full 80 minutes but was pushed into touch after the final whistle while attempting to score a double, with the final score, 15-15, saw a drawn series between the Lions and All Blacks.

Barrett was initially named in the 2017 Rugby Championship squad for but was ruled out for the rest of the year after requiring shoulder surgery. Barrett was replaced in the squad by then-uncapped Crusaders utility back, David Havili, almost immediately.

=== 2018–19 ===
After a good 2018 Super Rugby season, as well as another knee injury to Israel Dagg, Barrett was re-called by All Blacks Head Coach, Steve Hansen, in New Zealand's 33-man squad for the 2018 June series, a three-test series against France. He started alongside both of his older brothers, Scott and Beauden, in the first test of the series, making the Barrett brothers the first trio of siblings to ever be named in an international rugby team's starting lineup. Barrett was replaced in the test by Damian McKenzie, after 60 minutes, with the All Blacks winning against France, 52–11.

Barrett won Man of the Match in the second test against France, which took place on 16 June, at Barrett's homeground, Westpac Stadium. He scored the second and third two tries of his international career and played the full 80 minutes of the test, which was a 26–13 win, claiming the series for the All Blacks. Although Barrett performed well in the first and second tests of the series, he was benched for the third, with Waisake Naholo's ball-running preferred by the selectors. Barrett went on to replace Sonny Bill Williams in the third test's 57th minute, with winger Rieko Ioane, moving into outside centre, while All Blacks Vice-Captain, Ben Smith moved to the wing for Barrett at fullback. The third test was a 49–14 win, where Scott Barrett followed in Jordie's lead, winning Man of the Match.

The 2018 Rugby Championship saw Barrett miss the first Bledisloe Cup test against Australia's Wallabies, before he re-joined his two brothers in the All Blacks, for the second test against the Wallabies, on 25 August. With Rieko Ioane out injured, Barrett once again started at fullback, with Ben Smith and Waisake Naholo starting on the wings. Barrett's brother Beauden joined Jordie and Scott as a Man of the Match-winner during the 2018 season, scoring four tries in their 40–12 win over the Wallabies, which saw a 67-minute performance from Jordie, before he was replaced by Damian McKenzie.

Barrett missed another test in the Rugby Championship, with his Hurricanes team-mate, Nehe Milner-Skudder, earning a re-call for New Zealand after a long period of time being injured. He was then bought back into the starting lineup, at fullback, for the first test against South Africa at Westpac Stadium, on 15 September 2018. Barrett scored the opening try of the test, only 4 minutes in, but the test quickly went into South Africa's favour. Barrett, as well as his brother Beauden, both performed poorly in the test. Barrett notably let in Aphiwe Dyantyi for South Africa's first try, then throwing a pass to Willie le Roux, for South Africa's second try, only five minutes after Dyantyi's opening try. Barrett was replaced by Damian McKenzie, who also performed poorly, in the 58th minute. The All Blacks suffered a shock 34–36 loss to South Africa and Barrett did not play again during the Rugby Championship.

On the 2018 end-of-year tour, Barrett played in two tests. His first was a poor performance against Japan, which the All Blacks won with a 69–31 margin. For the final test of the 2018 season, against Italy, Barrett was unusually given a start on the right wing, with Waisake Naholo on the left wing and Rieko Ioane being used off the bench. Although he played on the wing, Barrett was the best-performing player on the field against Italy and won his second Man of the Match award for 2018, scoring four tries in the test, becoming only the third All Black of the decade to score four tries in a match, after his brother Beauden, and former All Black, Zac Guildford.

On 5 November 2020, Barrett represented the South Island in the 2020 North vs South rugby union match.

=== 2024–25 ===
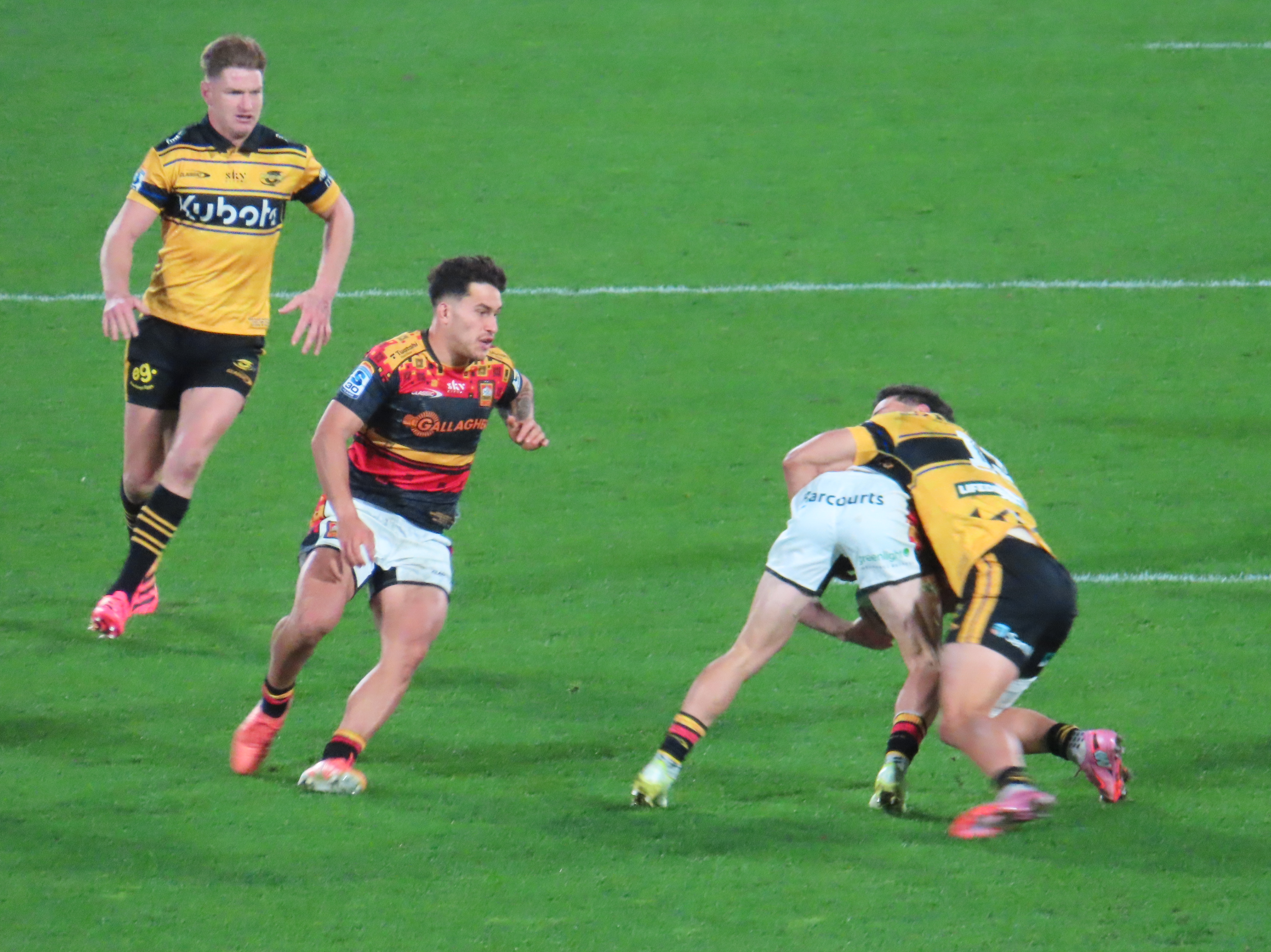
Barrett (in the background) playing for the Hurricanes in the 2026 Super Rugby Pacific final against the Chiefs. Quinn Tupaea of the Chiefs in the foreground.

In 2024, Barrett signed a six-month contract with Leinster for the 2024–25 United Rugby Championship season. On 8 December 2024, he made his debut for the club scoring a try from the bench in the Champions Cup as his side went on to beat Bristol Bears 35–12 at Ashton Gate. On 22 December 2024, he won his first player of the match award at the club after a 20–12 win over Connacht in the URC. In April 2025, he was nominated for Champions Cup Player of the Year 2025. in his final game of his Leinster stint, he picked up his first club medal scoring one of Leinster's four tries as they won the 2025 United Rugby Championship Grand Final 32 - 7 against Bulls.

=== 2026 ===
In 2026, Barrett formed part of the Hurricanes squad which won the 2026 Super Rugby Pacific season. On 20 June, the Hurricanes defeated the Chiefs 60–5 in the final. Barrett scored one of the Hurricanes' nine tries.

== Statistics ==
Club	Year	Competition	GP	GS	TRY	CON	PEN	DGL	PTS	WL%	Yellow card	Red card
Canterbury	2016†	Bunnings NPC (incl. Ranfurly Shield)	12	11	5	22	18	0	123	83.33	0	0
Taranaki	2020†	Bunnings NPC (incl. Ranfurly Shield)	2	2	1	4	3	0	22	100.00	0	0
Hurricanes	2017	Super Rugby	18	15	7	38	11	0	144	72.22	0	0
Hurricanes	2018	Super Rugby	16	15	3	13	5	0	56	68.75	0	0
Hurricanes	2019	Super Rugby	15	15	5	7	11	0	72	66.67	1	0
Hurricanes	2020	Super Rugby	11	11	0	23	16	0	94	72.73	1	0
Hurricanes	2021	Super Rugby	13	13	5	36	18	0	151	0.00	0	0
Hurricanes	2022	Super Rugby	12	12	3	26	17	0	118	0.00	0	0
Hurricanes	2023	Super Rugby	13	13	2	36	12	0	118	0.00	0	0
Leinster	2025	URC/ERCC	15	12	7	0	0	0	35	86.66	0	0
Career			99	94	29	169	99	0	780	72.97	2	0

Updated: 24 March 2023 Source: Jordan M Barrett Rugby History

=== List of international test tries ===
As of 15 June 2026

Try	Opposing team	Location	Venue	Competition	Date	Result	Score
1	British & Irish Lions	Auckland, New Zealand	Eden Park	2017 British & Irish Lions Tour to New Zealand	8 July 2017	Draw	15 - 15
2	France	Wellington, New Zealand	Westpac Stadium	2018 France rugby union tour of New Zealand	16 June 2018	Win	26 - 13
3	France	Wellington, New Zealand	Westpac Stadium	2018 France rugby union tour of New Zealand	16 June 2018	Win	26 - 13
4	South Africa	Wellington, New Zealand	Westpac Stadium	2018 Rugby Championship	15 September 2018	Loss	34 - 36
5	Italy	Rome, Italy	Stadio Olimpico	2018 end-of-year rugby union internationals	24 November 2018	Win	3 - 66
6	Italy	Rome, Italy	Stadio Olimpico	2018 end-of-year rugby union internationals	24 November 2018	Win	3 - 66
7	Italy	Rome, Italy	Stadio Olimpico	2018 end-of-year rugby union internationals	24 November 2018	Win	3 - 66
8	Italy	Rome, Italy	Stadio Olimpico	2018 end-of-year rugby union internationals	24 November 2018	Win	3 - 66
9	Canada	Ōita, Japan	Showa Denko Dome	2019 Rugby World Cup	2 October 2019	Win	63 - 0
10	Namibia	Tokyo, Japan	Ajinomoto Stadium	2019 Rugby World Cup	6 October 2019	Win	71 - 9
11	Ireland	Tokyo, Japan	Ajinomoto Stadium	2019 Rugby World Cup	19 October 2019	Win	46 - 14
12	Australia	Wellington, New Zealand	Westpac Stadium	2020 end-of-year rugby union internationals	11 October 2020	Draw	16 - 16
13	Australia	Auckland, New Zealand	Eden Park	2020 end-of-year rugby union internationals	18 October 2020	Win	27 - 7
14	Australia	Sydney, Australia	ANZ Stadium	2020 Tri Nations Series	31 October 2020	Win	5 - 43
15	Fiji	Dunedin, New Zealand	Forsyth Barr Stadium	2021 July rugby union tests	10 July 2021	Win	57 - 23
16	Australia	Perth, Australia	Optus Stadium	2021 Rugby Championship	5 September 2021	Win	21 - 38
17	France	Saint-Denis, France	Stade de France	2021 Autumn Nations Series	20 November 2021	Loss	40 - 25
18	Ireland	Auckland, New Zealand	Eden Park	2022 Ireland rugby union tour of New Zealand	2 July 2022	Win	42 - 19
19	Argentina	Hamilton, New Zealand	Waikato Stadium	2022 Rugby Championship	3 September 2022	Win	55 - 3
20	Australia	Melbourne, Australia	Docklands Stadium	2022 Rugby Championship	15 September 2022	Win	37 - 39
21	Wales	Cardiff, Wales	Millennium Stadium	2022 Autumn Nations Series	5 November 2022	Win	23 - 55
22	Wales	Cardiff, Wales	Millennium Stadium	2022 Autumn Nations Series	5 November 2022	Win	23 - 55
23	Argentina	Mendoza, Argentina	Estadio Malvinas Argentinas	2023 Rugby Championship	8 July 2023	Win	12 - 41
24	Argentina	Paris, France	Stade de France	2023 Rugby World Cup	20 October 2023	Win	44 - 6
25	South Africa	Johannesburg, South Africa	Ellis Park Stadium	2024 Rugby Championship	31 August 2024	Loss	31 - 27
26	France	Dunedin, New Zealand	Forsyth Barr Stadium	2025 France rugby union tour of New Zealand	5 July 2025	Win	31 - 27

== Honours ==
- Rugby World Cup / Webb Ellis Cup
  - Third place: 2019
  - Second place: 2023
- Tri Nations / The Rugby Championship
  - Winner: 2018, 2020, 2021, 2022, 2023
- Club Honours
  - 2024-25 United Rugby Championship - Winner
  - 2026 Super Rugby Pacific Season - Winner
