= Kane Barrett =

New Zealand rugby union player

- Full name: Kane Sinclair Barrett
- Born: 16 April 1990 (age 36) New Plymouth, New Zealand
- Height: 1.94 m (6 ft 4 in)
- Weight: 111 kg (17 st 7 lb; 245 lb)
- School: Francis Douglas Memorial College
- Notable relative(s): Beauden Barrett (brother); Jordie Barrett (brother); Scott Barrett (brother)
- Occupation: Dairy farmer

Rugby union career
- Position(s): Lock, Flanker
Senior career
Years	Team	Apps	(Points)
2010–2014	Taranaki	25	(10)
2013–2014	Blues	3	(0)
- Correct as of 5 May 2018
International career
Years	Team	Apps	(Points)
2007–2008	New Zealand Schools		(0)
- Correct as of 5 May 2018

Kane Sinclair Barrett (born 16 April 1990) is a retired New Zealand rugby union player. He represented Taranaki in the ITM Cup. Barrett made his Taranaki debut in 2010 and his strong performances saw him named in the Blues squad for the 2013 and 2014 Super Rugby seasons. He had international experience as well with the New Zealand Secondary Schools side. Barrett retired in 2014 due to ongoing concussion problems.

== Early life ==
Barrett was born on 16 April 1990 in New Plymouth. He grew up on the farm in Pungarehu, Taranaki. He has three sisters and four brothers, including All Blacks Beauden, Scott, and Jordie. He attended Francis Douglas Memorial College in New Plymouth and played for the local Coastal Rugby Club. Barrett's father Kevin Barrett made 14 appearances for the Hurricanes during the 1997 and 1998 seasons and played 167 first-class matches for Taranaki.

== Domestic career ==
=== ITM Cup ===
Aged only 20, Barrett played his first game for Taranaki in their 25–15 win over Otago, coming off the bench in the second half to join his younger brother, Beauden. He made a further five appearances.

=== Super Rugby ===
In September 2012 it was announced that he would join the Blues for the 2013 Super Rugby season and he made his debut against the Bulls in Round 3, playing 71 minutes of a 21–28 loss at Eden Park.

== International career ==
Barrett was selected in the New Zealand Secondary Schools side in 2008. He then made the side for a second year in 2009, and was named captain. With the New Zealand Under 20s he had only just missed selection for the 2010 IRB Junior World Championship held in Argentina. Barrett was also known in sevens after making Gordon Tietjens' squad to prepare for the Wellington Sevens, but again was unsuccessful.

Barrett retired from rugby in 2014 after suffering from concussion.
