= Vince Roberts =

New Zealand public servant and diplomat

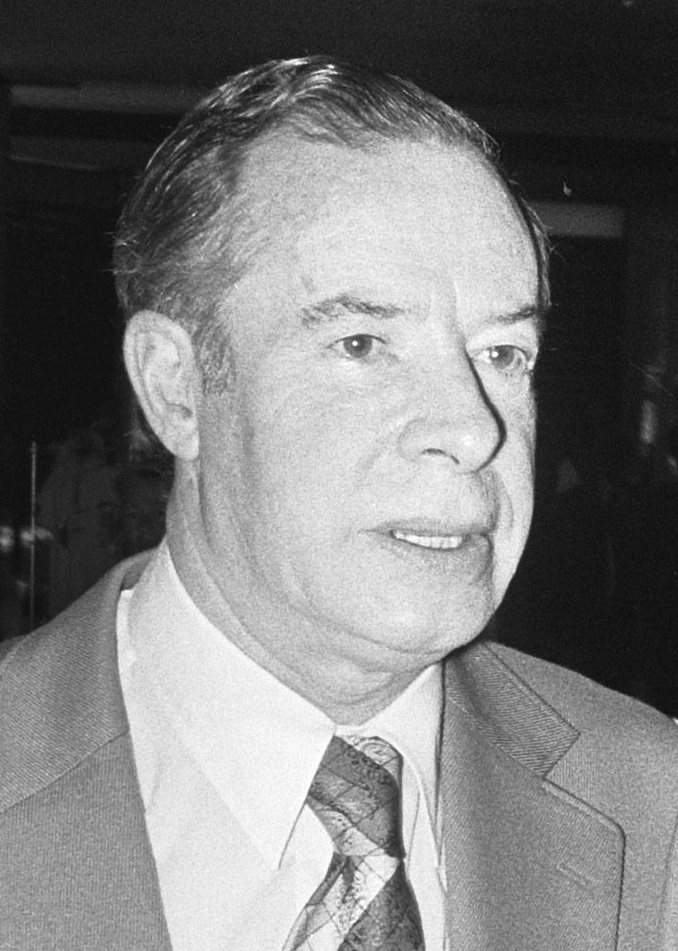

New Zealand ambassador to the Netherlands
- In office 6 January 1972 – 6 September 1977
- Preceded by: Rex Cunninghame
- Succeeded by: Gray Thorp

Personal details
- Born: Harold Vincent Roberts; 1 October 1916
- Died: 21 April 1993 (aged 76)

Harold Vincent Roberts (1 October 1916–21 April 1993) was a New Zealand public servant and diplomat.

== Biography ==
In 1959 Roberts joined the Ministry of Foreign Affairs. From 1964 to 1969 He was posted to the New Zealand Embassy in Paris as counsellor and on two occasions was Chargé d'affaires. In 1971 he was appointed New Zealand ambassador to the Netherlands by the prime minister Sir Keith Holyoake. In 1973 he was given concurrent accreditation to both Norway and Sweden. The most notable event during his tenure was when New Zealand took France to the World Court in The Hague on the issue of French nuclear tests in the Pacific. He left the post in 1977 and returned to Wellington. He was then the head of the African and Middle East Division of the Ministry of Foreign Affairs and led a New Zealand delegation to Geneva in 1980 to press for a treaty to comprehensively ban nuclear testing.

Roberts died on 21 April 1993, aged 76. He was cremated at the Karori Cemetery crematorium.
