= Scott Barrett (rugby union) =

New Zealand rugby union player

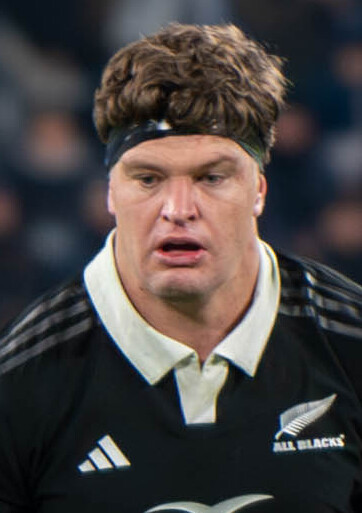
- Barrett representing New Zealand against Italy, November 2024
- Full name: Scott Kevin Barrett
- Born: 20 November 1993 (age 33) New Plymouth, New Zealand
- Height: 197 cm (6 ft 6 in)
- Weight: 115 kg (254 lb; 18 st 2 lb)
- School: Francis Douglas Memorial College
- University: Lincoln University
- Notable relative(s): Beauden Barrett (brother); Kane Barrett (brother); Jordie Barrett (brother); Kevin Barrett (father)

Rugby union career
- Position(s): Lock, Flanker
- Current team: Crusaders, Taranaki
Senior career
Years	Team	Apps	(Points)
2014-2016	Canterbury	19	(5)
2014-	Crusaders	132	(100)
2021-	Taranaki	3	(0)
- Correct as of 5 October 2026
International career
Years	Team	Apps	(Points)
2013	New Zealand U20	3	(0)
2016–	New Zealand	94	(35)
- Correct as of 21 November 2026
Medal record
Men's Rugby union
Representing New Zealand
Rugby World Cup
Silver medal – second place	2023 France	Squad
Bronze medal – third place	2019 Japan	Squad

Scott Kevin Barrett (born 20 November 1993) is a New Zealand rugby union player who plays as a lock for the Crusaders in Super Rugby and Taranaki in the National Provincial Championship. Barrett was named All Black captain in June 2024.

== Early life ==
Raised in a rugby household, where older brothers Beauden and Kane, as well as younger brother Jordie, also went on to become professional rugby players, Scott Barrett cut his teeth playing for Francis Douglas Memorial College in his native New Plymouth. Barrett's older brother Beauden and younger brother Jordie are his current All Black team-mates.

== Playing career ==
=== Early career ===
Barrett was a member of the New Zealand Under 20 team which participated in the 2013 IRB Junior World Championship in France, where he made 3 appearances in total.

Barrett got his big break in June 2014 when he was named in a Crusaders side shorn of its international players who played a midweek match against the touring England national team. The result did not turn out as Barrett would have liked, however when the Super Rugby season resumed following the mid-year internationals he gained his first full cap for the Crusaders. Injuries to international second-row forwards Sam Whitelock and Luke Romano saw Barrett named on the replacements bench for the match against the Blues on 5 July 2014. He came on as a 74th minute replacement for Jimmy Tupou in a 21–13 win for his side.

=== 2016–2017 ===
Scott Barrett made his debut for the All Blacks squad against Ireland on 5 November 2016 in Chicago. Barrett came on as a substitute early in the second half for Jerome Kaino who had been selected to unusually start at lock following injury to Sam Whitelock and Brodie Retallick, as well as Luke Romano returning home due to family bereavement. Barrett scored his first international try during that match, with the try converted by his older brother Beauden. The match was a historic loss to Ireland, the final score 40–29.

Barrett earned a start the following week against Italy, coming off the bench again for victories against Ireland and France. Barrett was the only All Black to play in all four tests on the 2016 end-of-year tour, a milestone for him as he had never been capped prior to the tour.

Barrett had become a regular starter for the Crusaders by 2017, replacing Luke Romano as newly appointed captain Sam Whitelock's locking partner, with Romano shifting to a regular bench spot for the 2017 season. Barrett missed the 3–12 loss against the touring British and Irish Lions for the Crusaders due to injury but recovered to start for them in all three of the knockout rounds of the 2017 season, being a part of the 2017 Super Rugby Final winning Crusaders side who beat the Lions 25–17 in Johannesburg on 5 August. Barrett has not missed selection for New Zealand since his debut, and was selected for the 33-man squad for the Pasifika Challenge against Samoa and the British and Irish Lions test series in mid-2017 alongside brothers Beauden and Jordie.

Barrett carried a heavy workload for the All Blacks in 2017 and he came off the bench in all three tests against the British and Irish Lions in the 2017 drawn series, but unfortunately only played a total of 15 minutes during the series due to the dominant play of Whitelock and Retallick.

Barrett returned to action after missing the first Bledisloe Cup test and replaced blindside flanker Liam Squire off the bench in the second of the series. Barrett only touched the ball once in the whole test, but used it to set his older brother up for the winning try. Barrett had a world-class impact off the bench against South Africa on 19 September. He joined the side of the scrum at blindside flanker after Squire was concussed in the 27th minute, scoring his second test try in the 57–0 win. Barrett was subsequently chosen to start in round 4 and 5 of the 2017 Rugby Championship against Argentina and South Africa, playing well in both, staying on the field for the full 80 minutes against Argentina. Barrett started another two times that year, against Australia and against the Barbarians due to Retallick not playing rugby for the rest of 2017 for personal reasons. Barrett went back to his regular role on the bench against France, a French XV and against Wales on the 2017 end-of-year tour, having made 14 appearances for the All Blacks after the season finished, including every single test but two.

=== 2018 ===
On 9 June 2018, in Brodie Retallick's continued absence, Scott Barrett joined Beauden and Jordie in the starting lineup in the first of three tests against France, becoming the first family to have 3 brothers in the starting lineup. Barrett played the full 80 minutes of the first test against France, with the All Blacks winning 52–11. Following good performances from all three Barrett brothers in the first test of the series, the trio started against France in the second test as well. Barrett played the full 80 minutes of the second test as well, with his younger brother Jordie winning Man of the Match as the All Blacks won 26–13.

On 23 June 2018, Barrett was the best performing All Black on the field, against France, in the third test of the series. Barrett finished off the Steinlager series by winning the award for Man of the Match, after an outstanding defensive performance, as the All Blacks won against France 49–14. He went the whole series without being subbed off, a rare feat for a player of his experience.

In the first two rounds of the 2018 Rugby Championship, Barrett was replaced as a starter, upon Retallick's much-anticipated return to international rugby. In the third test of the competition, Barrett was given the chance to start alongside Retallick, who was then injured again, in a 46–24 win over Argentina. Barrett then went on to start in all three remaining tests of the Championship, which included a shock 34–36 loss to South Africa's Springboks. The final test of the competition, also against South Africa, saw Barrett score his fourth try, in the dying minutes of the test. Late tries to Barrett and Ardie Savea, saw Barrett's Crusaders teammate, Richie Mo'unga, kick the winning conversion, ending the test with a narrow 32–30 win for New Zealand.

Barrett played in all four tests of New Zealand's end-of-season tour, finishing his year by starting in half of them.

=== 2019 ===
After a good 2019 Super Rugby season, Barrett returned from injury to the All Blacks prior to the 2019 Rugby World Cup. Barrett, who was short of match fitness, was immediately named to start in his first test for 2019, with Brodie Retallick's continued injury troubles enabling Barrett to keep his place as a regular starter among the All Blacks. In the test, against Australia, Barrett performed poorly in the first half. Barrett's performance ended after only 39 minutes, after he was controversially red-carded for a shoulder charge to the neck of Australian captain, Michael Hooper. Barrett became only the fourth New Zealander in the history of international rugby to be sent off during a test, joining teammate Sonny Bill Williams, amongst others. New Zealand was losing by 12–13 when Barrett was sent off, finishing the match with their worst defeat in history, 26–47. Barrett was subsequently suspended from playing for three weeks. Barrett returned to play for a 92–0 win over Tonga, although Patrick Tuipulotu was picked over him as a starter.

On 28 August, All Blacks head coach Steve Hansen named Barrett, as well as both of his brothers, amongst the 31 players in New Zealand's squad for the 2019 Rugby World Cup.

Barrett played in two tests during the World Cup's pool stages. A start against Canada saw the Barretts become the first trio of brothers to start for New Zealand in a World Cup match, and the first to all start in a World Cup match since Elisi Vunipola, Manu Vunipola, and Fe'ao Vunipola all played for Tonga in 1995. The Barrett brothers also became the first trio of brothers to all score a try in the same match, with Canada losing 63–0.

Although Barrett was benched for Brodie Retallick and Sam Whitelock for the quarter-final, against Ireland, he supplanted Sam Cane in the starting lineup for the semi-final, against England, confirming his place amongst New Zealand's best players. But with England fielding two openside flankers in their starting lineup, Barrett was subbed off at half-time in the semi-final, with New Zealand eventually losing 7–19. Coach, Steve Hansen went on to admit he made a mistake in starting three locks against England.

After New Zealand finished in third place at the Rugby World Cup, Barrett was named as the Crusaders' captain for the 2020 Super Rugby season. Barrett was subsequently touted as a future All Black captain.

== List of international test tries ==
Try	Date	Venue	Opponent	Result	Competition
1	5 November 2016	Soldier Field, Chicago, United States of America	Ireland	29–40 (Lost)	2016 End-Of-Year Tests
2	16 September 2017	QBE Stadium, North Harbour, New Zealand	South Africa	57–0 (Won)	2017 Rugby Championship
3	6 October 2018	Loftus Versfeld Stadium, Pretoria, South Africa	South Africa	32-30 (Won)	2018 Rugby Championship
4	21 September 2019	Yokohama Stadium, Yokohama, Japan	South Africa	23–13 (Won)	2019 Rugby World Cup
5	2 October 2019	Oita Stadium, Oita, Japan	Canada	63–0 (Won)	2019 Rugby World Cup
6	13 August 2022	Ellis Park, Johannesburg, South Africa	South Africa	35-23 (Won)	2022 Rugby Championship
7	13 November 2022	Murrayfield Stadium, Edinburgh, Scotland	Scotland	31-23 (Won)	2022 End-Of-Year Tests

Updated: 13 November 2022 Source:

== Honours ==
=== New Zealand ===
- Rugby World Cup / Webb Ellis Cup
  - Third-place: 2019
  - Second-place: 2023
- Bledisloe Cup
  - 2017 - 2026
- Tri Nations / The Rugby Championship
  - 2017, 2018, 2020, 2021, 2022, 2023

=== Crusaders ===
- Super Rugby Aotearoa / Super Rugby
  - 2017, 2018, 2019, 2020, 2021, 2022, 2023, 2025
