= Tim Weston =

New Zealand cricketer (born 1982)

Timothy Ian Weston (born 17 January 1982, in Stratford) is a cricket player from New Zealand who plays for Central Districts and Watsonians. He is a right-handed batsman (top score 152*), he also plays for Taranaki in the Hawke Cup. He is a teacher at Francis Douglas Memorial College in New Plymouth and plays for the school team in the Taranaki Premier Grade cricket competition along with Central Districts team-mate Peter Ingram who also teaches at the school.

Weston will be playing for Watsonian Cricket Club in Edinburgh, Scotland, for the 2010 season.
