= Francis Douglas Memorial College =

Location
- 201 Tukapa Street, Westown; New Plymouth; New Zealand; 39.0821°S 174.0533°E

Information
- Type: State integrated secondary, day and boarding
- Motto: Christo Duce (With Christ as our leader)
- Religious affiliation: Roman Catholic
- Established: 1959; 67 years ago
- Sister school: Sacred Heart Girls' College, New Plymouth
- Ministry of Education Institution no.: 175
- Principal: Tim Stuck
- Years offered: 7–13
- Gender: Boys
- Enrolment: 791 (July 2026)
- Socio-economic decile: 8
- Website: fdmc.school.nz

Francis Douglas Memorial College is an all-boys state-integrated Catholic school with boarding facilities located in Westown, New Plymouth, New Zealand. The college was founded in 1959 under the leadership of the De La Salle Brothers, a religious order of brothers based on the teachings of St. Jean-Baptiste de la Salle. It is one of two secondary schools established by the Brothers in New Zealand, the other being De La Salle College, Mangere East, Auckland. The name of the school is dedicated to the memory of Father Francis Vernon Douglas, a missionary priest who was killed while doing missionary work in the Philippines during the Second World War. The school educates approximately 760 boys, 130 of whom are boarders. The 60th Jubilee of Francis Douglas Memorial College was held on Queen's Birthday Weekend, 2019.

== Sporting ==
74% of students participate in at least one sport. The most popular sport at the school is rugby union, other sports include hockey, cricket, basketball, soccer, rowing, and athletic events, with basketball being the fastest growing sport at the school. Annually, the school plays a rugby union match against major cross-town rivals New Plymouth Boys' High School, this being one of the major events on the school calendar.

== Music ==
Francis Douglas Memorial College has a music department where bands develop their talents. Many students have performed in the annual Smokefree Rockquest competition, with bands from the college winning two Regional Finals. Students have performed at the G-TARanaki Guitar Festival and were shown guitar skills by Uli Jon Roth.

== Māori culture ==
The school runs cultural activities, such as the Annual Inter-house Haka Competition, and school camping trips to a marae.

The first inter-house Haka Competition was in 2010. Students register their names for the activity and each House performs their Haka with the school as an audience. The winning house is chosen by a judge who is a popular figure from New Plymouth.

The school has a school Haka written by an ex-student Hemi Sundgrem which is about the founders of the school, Francis Douglas and the De La Salle Brothers.

== Houses ==
- Benildus (Green)
- La Salle (Yellow)
- Loreto (Blue)
- Solomon (Red)

== Boarding ==
La Salle House is the boarding hostel for Francis Douglas Memorial College.

== Notable alumni ==
=== Academia ===
- Br. Peter Bray – Vice-Chancellor, Bethlehem University
- Michael Kelly – Prince Philip Professor of Technology, University of Cambridge

=== Arts ===
- Anthony McCarten – author, playwright and screenwriter

=== Broadcasting ===
- Patrick Gower – journalist
- Jim Hickey – weather presenter

=== Public service ===
- Andrew Harris NZBS – mountain guide who died in the 1996 Mount Everest disaster
- Steven Joyce – Member of Parliament (2008–2018)

=== Sport ===
==== Athletics ====
- Michael Aish

==== Swimming ====
- Zac Reid – (Olympian)

==== Football ====
- Frank van Hattum
- Oskar van Hattum

==== Rugby union ====
- Beauden Barrett
- Jordie Barrett
- Kane Barrett
- Scott Barrett
- Shane Cleaver
- Liam Coltman
- Scott Fuglistaller
- Shamus Hurley-Langton
- Du'Plessis Kirifi
- Deacon Manu
- John Mitchell
- Jayson Potroz
- Leon Power
- Jacob Ratumaitavuki-Kneepkens
- Ricky Riccitelli
- Conrad Smith
- Teihorangi Walden
- Paul Williams (rugby referee) – Rugby union referee

== Notable staff ==
- Peter Ingram- Cricket coach (now at Hawera High School)
- Ian Snook – Cricket coach
- Tim Weston – Cricket coach
