= List of ambassadors of New Zealand to the Netherlands =

The Ambassador from New Zealand to the Netherlands is New Zealand's foremost diplomatic representative in the Kingdom of the Netherlands, and in charge of New Zealand's diplomatic mission in the Netherlands.

The embassy is located in The Hague. New Zealand has maintained a resident ambassador in the Netherlands since 1967, and a resident Head of Mission since 1950. The Ambassador to the Netherlands is concurrently accredited to Denmark, Finland, Iceland, Norway and Sweden.

== List of heads of mission ==
=== Consuls to the Netherlands ===
- J V Brennan (1950–1952)
- C F Shapcott (1952–1957)
- Norman Johnson (1957–1961)
- Jim Hale (1961–1965)

=== Ambassadors to the Netherlands ===
==== Non-resident ambassadors, resident in France ====
- Dick Hutchens (1965–1967)

==== Resident ambassadors ====
- Rex Cunninghame (1967–1972)
- Vince Roberts (1972–1977)
- Gray Thorp (1977–1982)
- Basil Bolt (1982–1988)
- Ken Cunningham (1988–1991)
- Graeme Ammundsen (1991–1995)
- Hilary Willberg (1995–1998)
- Chris Butler (1998–2002)
- David Payton (2002–2006)
- Rachel Fry (2006-2010)
- George Troup (2010-2014)
- Janet Lowe (diplomat) (2014-2017)
- Lyndal Walker (2017-)

== See also ==
- Netherlands–New Zealand relations
