= Henry Keesing =

Dutch shopkeeper, financier, community leader (1791–1879)

Henry Keesing (31 December 1791 – 10 May 1879) was a New Zealand shopkeeper, financier and community leader. He was born as Hartog ben Tobias / Hartog Zwi Tobias Keesing in Amsterdam, Netherlands on 31 December 1791, but changed his name to Hartog Tobias Keesing in 1811, and later anglicised his first name to Henry.
