= Conrad Smith =

New Zealand rugby union coach and player

Conrad Smith MNZM
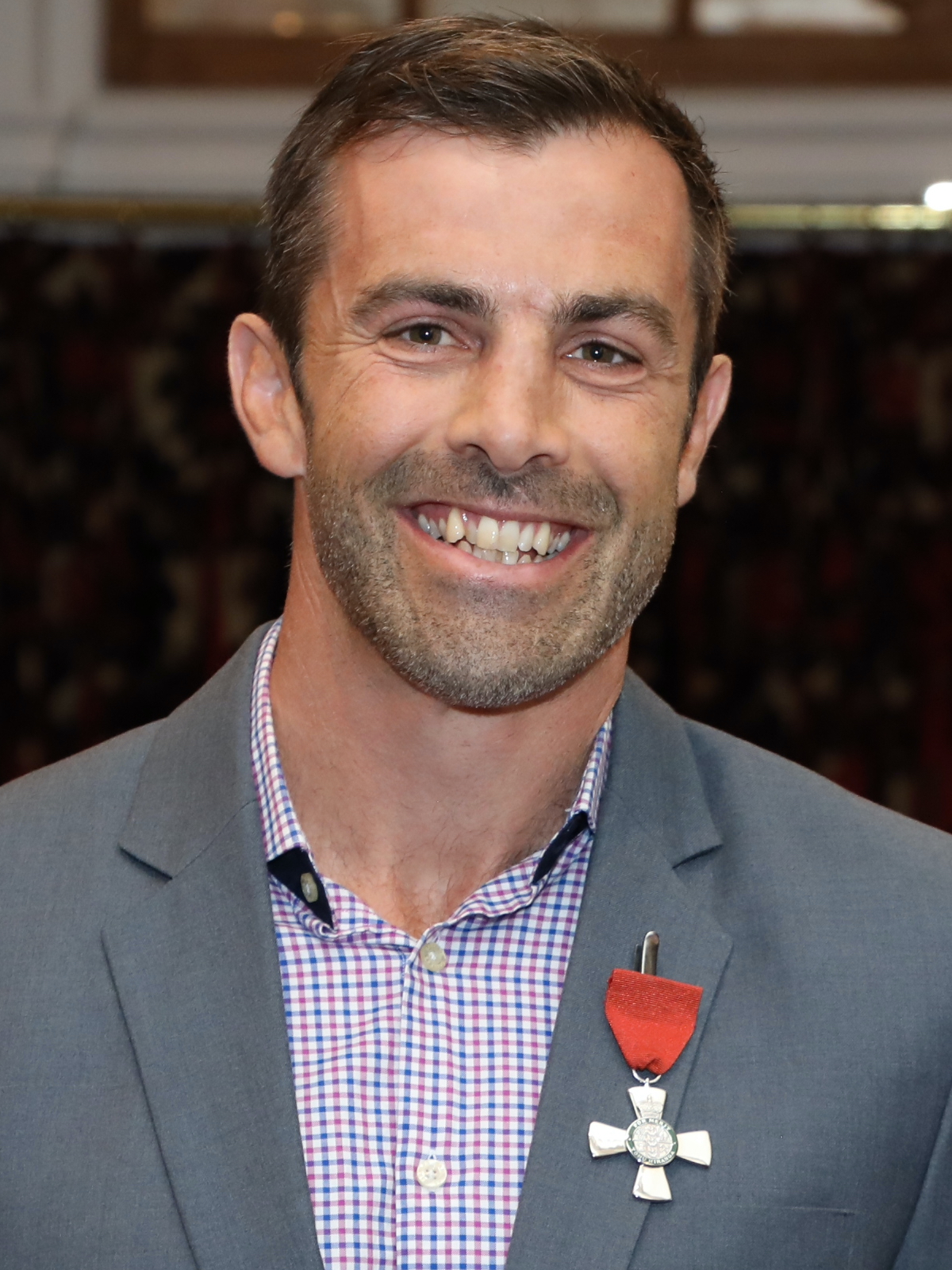
- Smith in 2021
- Born: Conrad Gerard Smith; 12 October 1981 (age 45) Hāwera, New Zealand
- Height: 1.86 m (6 ft 1 in)
- Weight: 95 kg (209 lb; 14 st 13 lb)
- School: Francis Douglas Memorial College
- University: Victoria University of Wellington

Rugby union career
- Position: Centre
Senior career
Years	Team	Apps	(Points)
2003–2015	Wellington	43	(60)
2004–2015	Hurricanes	126	(120)
2015–2018	Pau	52	(29)
- Correct as of 20 May 2018
International career
Years	Team	Apps	(Points)
2004–2015	New Zealand	94	(130)
- Correct as of 20 May 2018

Conrad Gerard Smith MNZM (born 12 October 1981) is a New Zealand rugby union coach and former player, who played predominantly at centre. He captained the Hurricanes in Super Rugby, and played for New Zealand from 2004 until 2015. He was a key member of New Zealand's 2011 and 2015 Rugby World Cup winning teams. Following the 2015 World Cup he retired from international rugby and took up a contract with Pau in France, before retiring in 2018.

After retiring, he began a defence coaching role with Pau, and extended his contract as the club's High Performance Manager in 2020. He eventually returned to New Zealand in 2021, but still worked for Dublin-based International Rugby Players.

== Early life ==
Smith played in various Taranaki age group teams. He attended St Joseph's Catholic School and Francis Douglas Memorial College, both in New Plymouth. Besides rugby he also excelled in cricket and was known as a fast bowler; his current nickname "Snakey" originated from his fielding which his coach described as akin to a snake slithering. After completing secondary school he moved to Wellington where he completed an LLB (Hons) at Victoria University of Wellington, residing at Weir House. Smith has been admitted as a barrister and solicitor of the High Court of New Zealand.

== Domestic career ==
Smith spent most of his career with the Hurricanes in Super Rugby, and also for Wellington in the ITM Cup. He made his Wellington debut in 2003, and was signed by the Hurricanes in 2004. Smith's Hurricanes career was plagued by injury, and having been injured in 2006, 2007 and 2011, he made just 66 appearances in his first eight seasons with the side. He was Hurricanes captain until the end of the 2015 season, having led the side for the first time in 2007 in place of the injured Rodney So'oialo. In February 2015 he announced that the upcoming 2015 Super Rugby season would be his last as he would be joining Pau on a two-year contract.

Smith made his debut for Pau on 19 December 2015 in the European Rugby Challenge Cup Pool 2 match against Welsh side Newport Gwent Dragons.

== International career ==
He made his All Blacks debut age 22, versus Italy in 2004, after a meteoric rise which saw him make his professional debut just a season earlier. In 2006, Smith won a place on the end of year tour to Europe, despite breaking his leg for the Hurricanes earlier that year. In 2007, Smith faced a number of setbacks, mostly involving injury. However, he eventually earned his way back into a starting position, and by 2008, was the first choice centre for the All Blacks.

Smith was a member of the 2011 Rugby World Cup winning squad playing in the final against France at Eden Park in Auckland on 23 October 2011.

Against Argentina on 28 September 2013, Smith and inside centre Ma'a Nonu achieved a record fifty international games together.

Smith took a six-month break from rugby during the 2013 end-of-year tour, meaning he did not travel with the All Blacks squad to Japan and Europe.

In 2015, Smith was named New Zealand's Rugby World Cup team for the third time. The All Blacks won this tournament and Smith played a crucial role throughout, starting in six out of six matches. He was one of six senior players – the others being Keven Mealamu, all-time points scorer Dan Carter, long-time midfield partner Ma'a Nonu, Tony Woodcock and captain Richie McCaw – to retire after the tournament.

== Other work ==
Off the field, Smith is involved in the New Zealand Rugby Players Association (NZRPA) and sits on the board as a Player Representative. In 2015, he and McCaw were named as the New Zealand representatives in the 48-member Player Advisory Group by the International Rugby Players Association (IRPA).

== Personal ==
Smith married Leanne Snowdon in October 2013. Smith missed a test match in Sydney for the birth of their first child, a boy, in August 2014.

== Honours ==
=== Personal accolades ===
- Member of the New Zealand Order of Merit for services to rugby (2016 New Year Honours)
- Steinlager Investec Super Rugby Player of the Year
- Wellington Sportsperson of the Year
- The Dominion Post Personality of the Year
- Record Midfield Partnerships (along with Ma'a Nonu)
- Kel Tremain Memorial Player of the Year (Nomination)
- Air New Zealand NPC Division One Player of the Year (Nomination)

=== Hurricanes ===
- Hurricanes Captain
- Super Rugby Centurion
- Most Capped Hurricanes Player (along with Ma'a Nonu)
- Conference Winner 2015

=== New Zealand ===
- Tri Nations/The Rugby Championship Champion 2005, 2006, 2007, 2008, 2010, 2012, 2013 and 2014
- British and Irish Lions Series Victory, 2005[51]
- Home Nations Grand Slam Tour, 2005,[52] 2008[53] and 2010[54]
- Rugby World Cup Winner 2011, 2015
