= Netherlands–New Zealand relations =

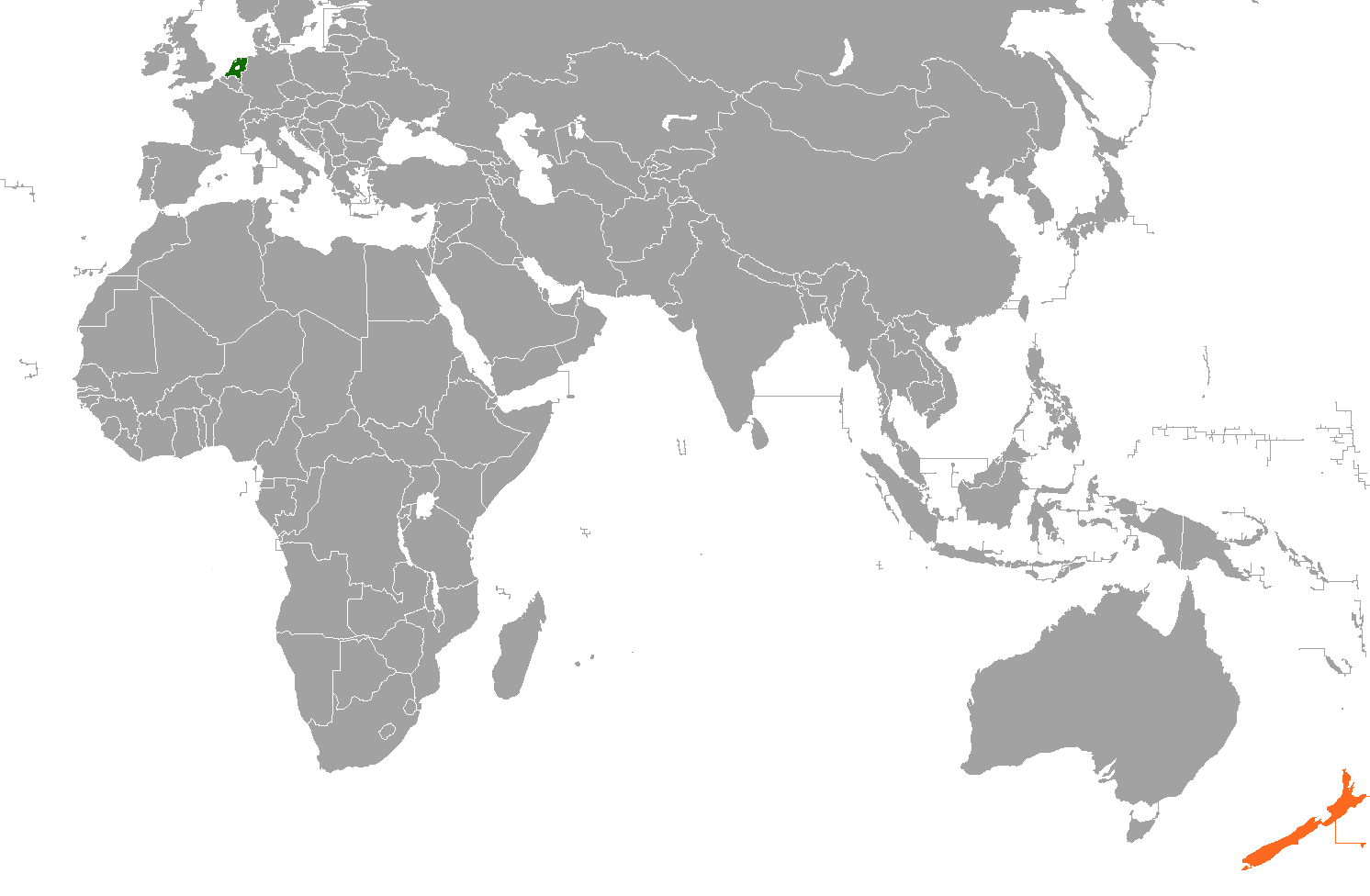

- Netherlands: New Zealand

Envoy
- Ambassador Ard van der Vorst: Ambassador Lyndal Walker

Netherlands–New Zealand relations is the official relationship between the Kingdom of the Netherlands and New Zealand. New Zealand has an embassy in The Hague and the Netherlands has an embassy in Wellington. The Ambassador to the Netherlands is concurrently accredited to Denmark, Finland, Iceland and Norway.

Both New Zealand and the Netherlands are constitutional monarchies. They share very similar social attitudes and values and have a substantial history of working together on issues of international importance. They often cooperate closely in multilateral forums. In many international meetings the Netherlands delegation is seated immediately alongside New Zealand.

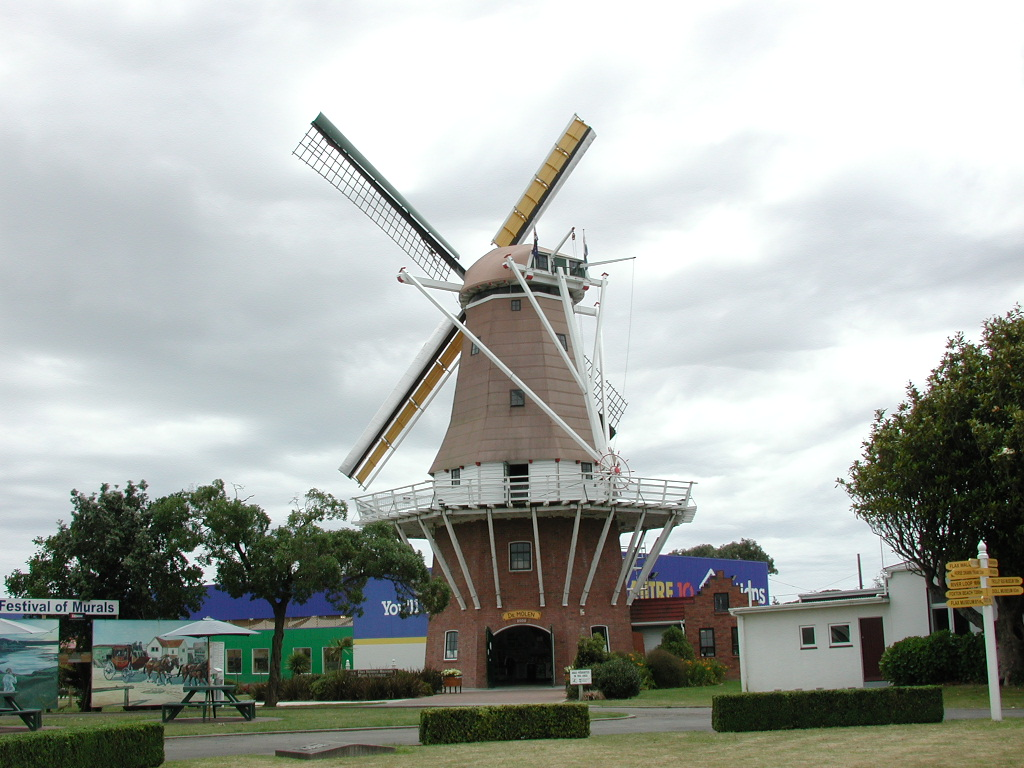
De Molen in Foxton, New Zealand

There is also a strong academic and research cooperation between Wageningen University in the Netherlands and Massey University in New Zealand. Cultural connections between the two countries were enhanced in 2010, with “Te Hono ki Aotearoa”, a waka taua, being provided on permanent loan to the Dutch National Museum of Ethnology in Leiden. Moreover, 256 New Zealand airmen killed in World War II lie buried in the Netherlands, in 85 different cemeteries. In 2003, a full size replica of a Dutch windmill, called De Molen was completed and opened in Foxton, New Zealand.

== History ==
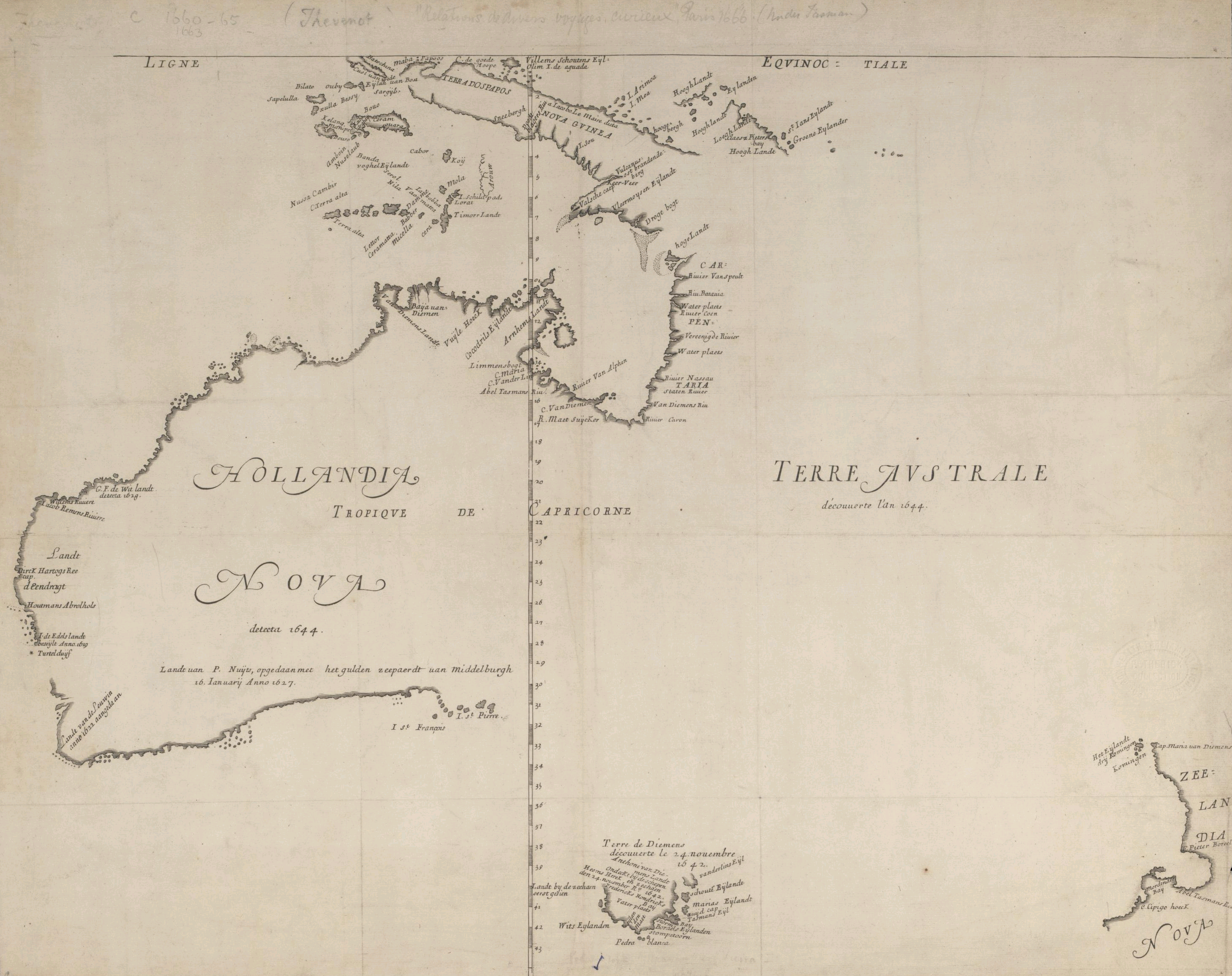
An early map of Australasia during the Golden Age of Dutch exploration and discovery (c. 1590s–1720s). Based on a chart by Joan Blaeu, c. 1644

Historically there has been a strong link between New Zealand and the Netherlands. In December 1642, Dutch explorer Abel Tasman became the first European to sight New Zealand. He arrived in his ships Heemskerck and Zeehaen and anchored at the northern end of the South Island in Golden Bay (he named it Murderers' Bay). Tasman named it Staten Land "in honour of the States General" (Dutch parliament). He wrote, "it is possible that this land joins to the Staten Land but it is uncertain", referring to a landmass of the same name at the southern tip of South America, discovered by Jacob Le Maire in 1616. He also named Cape Maria van Diemen and the Three Kings Islands. Mount Tasman, Abel Tasman National Park, the Tasman Glacier and the Tasman Region are named after him. In a hostile encounter, four crew members were killed and at least one Māori was hit by canister shot. Tasman sketched sections of the two main islands' west coasts and left and there was no further contact between the Netherlands and New Zealand for more than a hundred years. In 1645, Dutch cartographers renamed the land Nova Zeelandia after the Dutch province of Zeeland. British explorer James Cook subsequently anglicised the name to New Zealand. Once New Zealand was established as a state in 1840 relations have been good.

The relationship was enhanced significantly with migration of large numbers of Dutch people to New Zealand after World War II. Before World War II there were only 128 Dutch-born people in New Zealand, including Gerrit van Asch (grandfather of Henry Piet Drury van Asch) who established the Van Asch College, and Petrus van der Velden. New Zealand's eighth premier Julius Vogel was son of a Dutchman. As a result of negotiations between the Dutch and New Zealand Governments a migration agreement was signed in October 1950. This resulted in thousands of Dutch immigrants coming to New Zealand in subsequent years. Peaking between 1951 and 1954, with 10,583 immigrants. By 1968, they formed the biggest group of non-British immigrant groups.

New Zealand has maintained a resident ambassador in the Netherlands since 1967, and a resident Head of Mission since 1950.

== Diaspora ==
The 2013 census shows that 28,503 people identified their ethnic group as Dutch. The Netherlands Embassy in Wellington estimated that there were approximately 45,000 Dutch citizens residing in New Zealand. This number includes persons with dual New Zealand and Dutch nationality. Today more than 150,000 New Zealanders claim Dutch heritage. There is also a sizable expatriate New Zealand community in the Netherlands.

== Trade ==
The Netherlands is an important export destination for New Zealand's goods and a significant source of investment. For the year 2017, the Netherlands was its fourth-largest trading partner within the European Union. Fonterra and Mainfreight have both chosen to locate their European Headquarters in the Netherlands.

In 2017, New Zealand exported $874 million (403 237 goods) to the Netherlands and imported $571 million (510 282 goods).Top export products are sheep meat, dairy products and unwrought aluminium. Top import products are machinery, tobacco and food preparations.

== State visits ==
=== Netherlands to New Zealand ===
- 5-10 February 1951: Prime Minister Willem Drees
- 17–20 May 1953: Prime Minister Willem Drees
- 20–23 January 1955: Prime Minister Willem Drees (unofficial)
- February 2014: Frans Timmermans, Minister of Foreign Affairs
- April 2015: General Tom Middendorp, Chief of Defence
- November 2016: Minister of Foreign Affairs Bert Koenders, Minister of Economic Affairs Henk Kamp and a trade delegation (with King Willem-Alexander and Queen Máxima)

==== Royal visits ====
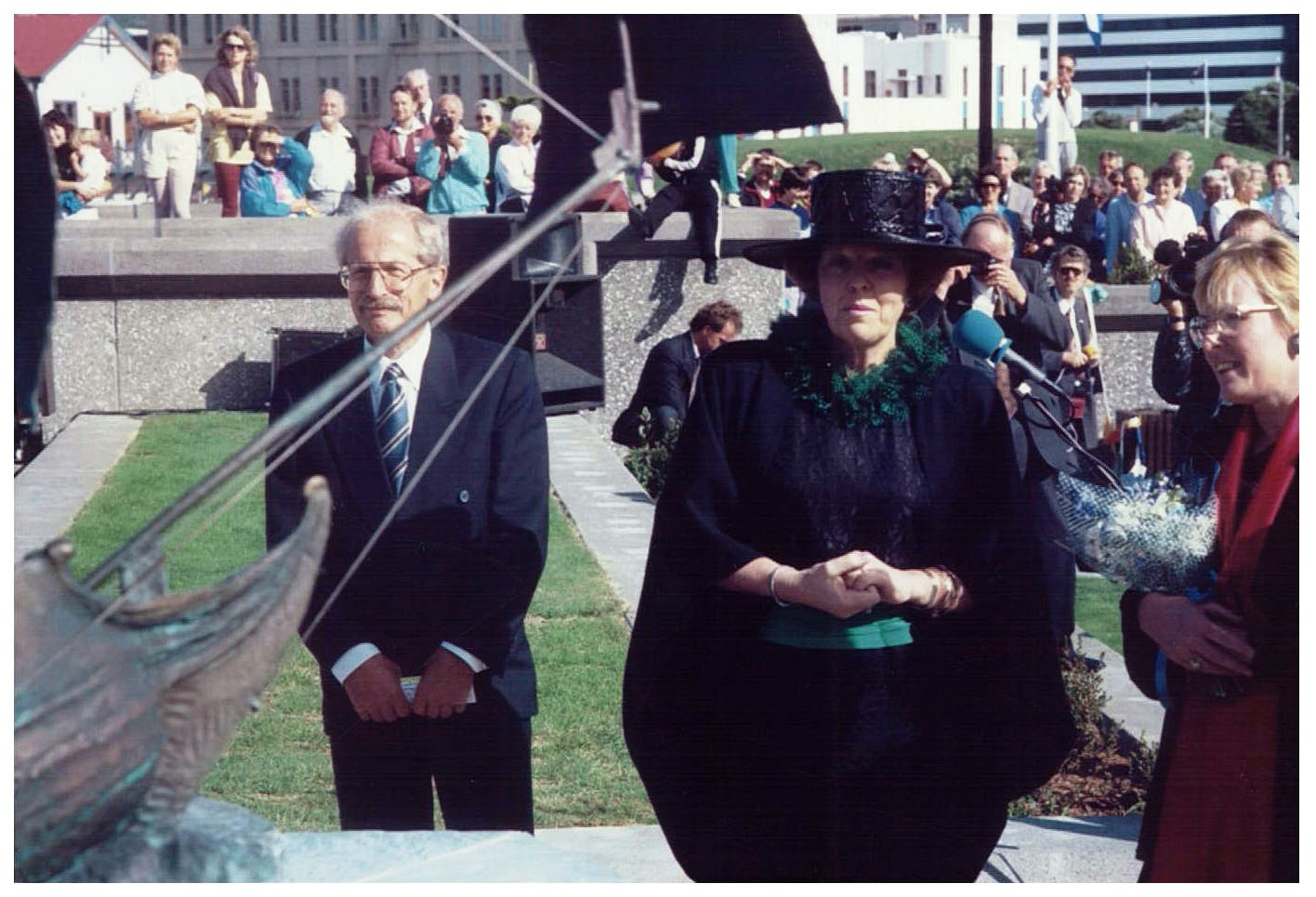
Queen Beatrix of the Netherlands unveiled sculptures of the 'Heemskerck' and 'Zeehaen' in Wellington's Frank Kitts Park in 1992

- Queen Beatrix of the Netherlands
  - March 1992
- Willem-Alexander of the Netherlands and Máxima of the Netherlands
  - November 2006 (as prince and princess)
  - 7–9 November 2016 - Wellington, Christchurch and Auckland

=== New Zealand to the Netherlands ===
- March 2018: Andrew Little, Minister of Justice
- April 2018: Members of Parliament Amy Adams, Jacqui Dean and Kanwaljit Singh Bakshi

== Resident diplomatic missions ==
- the Netherlands has an embassy in Wellington.
- New Zealand has an embassy in The Hague.

== See also ==
- Foreign relations of the Netherlands
- Foreign relations of New Zealand
