= Bernardina Adriana Schramm =

New Zealand pianist and music teacher

Bernardina Adriana Schramm (1900–1987) was a notable New Zealand pianist and music teacher. She was born in Rotterdam, Netherlands in 1900.
