= Frank van Hattum =

New Zealand footballer

Personal information
- Full name: Francesco van Hattum
- Date of birth: 17 November 1958 (age 68)
- Place of birth: New Plymouth, New Zealand
- Height: 1.82 m (5 ft 11 1/2 in)
- Position: Goalkeeper

Youth career
- 1975: Moturoa U18s

Senior career*
Years	Team	Apps	(Gls)
1975	Moturoa	13	(0)
1976–1978	Hamilton		
1979–1982	Manurewa	140	(0)
1983	Christchurch United	20	(0)
1984	Papatoetoe	22	(0)
1985–1986	Auckland University	41	(1)
1987–1989	Mount Maunganui		
1990	Manurewa		

International career
1980–1986	New Zealand	28	(0)
- * Club domestic league appearances and goals

Francesco van Hattum (born 17 November 1958 in New Plymouth) is a former New Zealand football player who was a goalkeeper during the country's first World Cup finals tournament in 1982. His international career started in 1980, and he played a total of 41 times for his country including unofficial matches.

== Career ==
Van Hattum made his official All Whites debut in a 2–0 win over Fiji on 21 February 1980 and ended his international playing career with 28 A-international caps to his credit, his final cap an appearance in a 1–2 loss to Australia on 2 November 1986.

Controversially, van Hattum replaced Richard Wilson as goalkeeper for all three games at the finals tournament in Spain despite Wilson's having played in all fifteen of New Zealand's qualifying matches.

Van Hattum was rated 2nd behind Mark Bosnich of Australia in the Oceania Goalkeeper of the Century category in International Federation of Football History and Statistics' Century Elections.

Serving as a director on the New Zealand Football Board, van Hattum stood for re-election at the AGM for an expected board shake-up and was elected chairman of the seven person board on 25 June 2008. He also serves on the FIFA Associations Committee. On 23 January 2014 Van Hattum announced his intention to step down as chairman at the February board meeting.

== Family ==
The son of a goalkeeper coach, Frits van Hattum, Frank comes from a sporting family with two of his sisters, Marie-Jose Cooper and Grazia MacIntosh, have also represented New Zealand with the New Zealand women's national football team, the Football Ferns, while nephew Oskar van Hattum is a New Zealand under-17 international.

His youngest sister, Stella Pennell, represented New Zealand with the New Zealand Karate Federation – first as competitor, then as Women's coach.

His nephew is Oskar van Hattum.

== Honours ==
=== Club ===
Manurewa

- Chatham Cup: 1978

== See also ==
- New Zealand national football team
- List of New Zealand international footballers
