= Grazia MacIntosh =

New Zealand footballer (born 1955)

Char MacIntosh
Personal information
- Full name: Grazia MacIntosh
- Date of birth: 25 April 1955 (age 71)
- Place of birth: New Plymouth, New Zealand
- Height: 1.65 m (5 ft 5 in)
- Position: Goalkeeper

International career
Years	Team	Apps	(Gls)
1981–1982	New Zealand	4	(0)

Grazia MacIntosh (née van Hattum) (born 25 April 1955 in New Plymouth) is a former association football goalkeeper who represented New Zealand at international level.

MacIntosh made her full Football Ferns debut in a 1–2 loss to Australia on 4 October 1981.

MacIntosh is the sister of former All Whites goalkeeper Frank van Hattum and fellow women's international Marie-Jose Cooper.
