= Marie-Jose Cooper =

New Zealand footballer

Zay Cooper
Personal information
- Full name: Maria-Jose Cooper
- Date of birth: 16 July 1960 (age 66)
- Position: Midfielder

International career
Years	Team	Apps	(Gls)
1979	New Zealand	1	(0)

Maria-Jose Cooper (née van Hattum) (born 16 July 1960) is a former association football player who represented New Zealand at international level.

Cooper made a single appearance for the Football Ferns in a 1–0 win over Australia on 8 October 1979.

Cooper is the sister of former All Whites goalkeeper Frank van Hattum and fellow women's international Grazia MacIntosh.
