= List of 2026 Super Rugby Pacific matches =

This article contains a list of all scheduled matches to be played during the 2026 Super Rugby Pacific regular season. The draw for the 31st season of Super Rugby was released on 28 August 2025, with several key fixture announcements made in the weeks before. Similar to the 2025 season, each team will play fourteen fixtures and have two byes throughout the season. Each team will play a domestic "rival" team twice on a home-and-away basis, with their remaining fixtures being against non-domestic teams. The 2026 season will not include a "Culture Round" or "Kids Round"; however, there will be a convergence of two significant rugby events, "ANZAC Weekend Round" and "Super Round" (as in 2022), into a single weekend, held at the newly constructed One NZ Stadium in Christchurch, New Zealand. "Club Round" was introduced for the first time for the fourth round, which included local clubs participating in pre-match shows and halftime entertainment, and included players donning their clubs socks during matches.

Two rounds of pre-season games were announced on 14 January 2026 and featured all eleven teams in at least one match played ahead of the 2026 Super Rugby Pacific season. The regular season formally begun on 13 February 2026 and is set to finish on 30 May 2026, before the start of the 2026 Finals series.

== Round 1 ==
13 February 2026
19:05 NZDT (UTC+13)

| Highlanders | 25–23 | Crusaders |
| Try: Caleb Tangitau 15'; Angus Taʻavao 45'; Jonah Lowe 49'; Con: Cam Millar (2/3) 46', 50'; Pen: Cam Millar (2/2) 3', 79' | Report | Try: Noah Hotham 20'; Will Jordan 61'; Con: Rivez Reihana (1/1) 21'; Taha Kemara (1/1) 62'; Pen: Rivez Reihana (2/2) 40+1', 42'; Taha Kemara (1/1) 72' |

Forsyth Barr Stadium, Dunedin
Attendance: 15,170
Referee: Angus Gardner (Australia)

13 February 2026
19:35 AEDT (UTC+11)

| Waratahs | 36–12 | Reds |
| Try: Clem Halaholo 7'; Max Jorgensen (2) 40', 72'; Isaac Aedo Kailea 66'; Teddy Wilson 78'; Con: Lawson Creighton (4/5) 8', 40+1', 67', 73'; Pen: Lawson Creighton (1/1) 38' | Report | Try: Tim Ryan 20'; Joe Brial 40+2'; Con: Harry McLaughlin-Phillips (1/2) 40+3'; Cards: Vaiuta Latu (yellow card) 35' |

Allianz Stadium, Sydney
Attendance: 16,655
Referee: Paul Williams (New Zealand)

14 February 2026
15:35 FJT (UTC+12)

| Drua | 26–40 | Moana Pasifika |
| Try: Tuidraki Samusamuvodre 23'; Kitione Salawa 40'; Ilaisa Droasese 46'; Temo Mayanavanua 64'; Con: Kemu Valetini (3/4) 24', 47', 65'; Cards: Mesake Vocevoce (yellow card) 31' | Report | Try: Semisi Tupou Ta'eiloa 5'; Miracle Faiʻilagi (3) 10', 17', 42'; Tevita Ofa 32'; Ofa Tauatevalu 78'; Con: Patrick Pellegrini (5/6) 6', 11', 18', 33', 79'; Pen: Patrick Pellegrini (0/1) |

Churchill Park, Lautoka
Referee: Marcus Playle (New Zealand)

14 February 2026
19:05 NZDT (UTC+13)

| Blues | 15–19 | Chiefs |
| Try: Zarn Sullivan 35'; Dalton Papali'i 53'; Con: Stephen Perofeta (0/1); Zarn Sullivan (1/1) 54'; Pen: Stephen Perofeta (0/1); Zarn Sullivan (1/1) 66'; Cards: Sam Nock (yellow card) 78' | Report | Try: Tupou Vaa'i 32'; Samisoni Taukei'aho 63'; Cortez Ratima 76'; Con: Josh Jacomb (2/3) 64', 77'; Pen: Josh Jacomb (0/1); Cards: Kaylum Boshier (yellow card) 38' |

Eden Park, Auckland (Note: The venue for the Blues home fixtures in the 2026 season wasn't yet known at the time the schedule for the 2026 Super Rugby Pacific season was released. On 4 September 2025, the Blues announced that their home games would take place at Eden Park, Auckland.)
Attendance: 20,000
Referee: Ben O'Keeffe (New Zealand)

14 February 2026
16:35 AWST (UTC+8)

| Force | 24–56 | Brumbies |
| Try: Vaiolini Ekuasi 7'; Franco Molina 53'; Carlo Tizzano 77'; Con: Ben Donaldson (3/3) 8', 54', 78'; Pen: Ben Donaldson (1/1) 22' | Report | Try: Charlie Cale (2) 23', 79'; Declan Meredith (2) 35', 59'; Rhys van Nek 43'; Ryan Lonergan 48'; Corey Toole 67'; Ollie Sapsford 80+2'; Con: Ryan Lonergan (5/5) 24', 36', 44', 49', 60'; Tane Edmed (3/3) 68', 80', 80+3'; Cards: Tevita Alatini (yellow card) 76' |

HBF Park, Perth
Attendance: 5,255
Referee: Jordan Way (Australia)

Bye/s: Hurricanes

== Round 2 ==
20 February 2026
19:05 NZDT (UTC+13)

| Hurricanes | 52–10 | Moana Pasifika |
| Try: Fehi Fineanganofo (2) 12', 25'; Josh Moorby (3) 17', 29', 44'; Brayden Iose (2) 62', 74'; Billy Proctor 78'; Con: Brett Cameron (1/2) 13'; Jordie Barrett (5/6) 30', 45', 63', 75', 79' | Report | Try: Tuna Tuitama 7'; Patrick Pellegrini 67'; Con: Patrick Pellegrini (0/2) |

Sky Stadium, Wellington
Attendance: 10,967
Referee: Angus Gardner (Australia)

20 February 2026
19:35 AEDT (UTC+11)

| Waratahs | 36–13 | Drua |
| Try: Charlie Gamble 10'; Max Jorgensen (2) 37', 80'; Ioane Moananu (2) 50', 72'; Angus Blyth 59'; Con: Lawson Creighton (3/6) 11', 38', 51' | Report | Try: Taniela Rakuro 14'; Con: Isaiah Armstrong-Ravula (1/1) 15'; Pen: Isaiah Armstrong-Ravula (2/2) 34', 45' |

Allianz Stadium, Sydney
Attendance: 13,578
Referee: Nic Berry (Australia)

21 February 2026
19:05 NZDT (UTC+13)

| Highlanders | 23–26 | Chiefs |
| Try: Jona Nareki 3'; Caleb Tangitau 75'; Veveni Lasaqa 80+1'; Con: Cam Millar (1/1) 4'; Reesjan Pasitoa (0/2); Pen: Cam Millar (2/2) 42', 45'; Cards: Jona Nareki (yellow card) 51' | Report | Try: Samisoni Taukei'aho (2) 8', 62'; Leroy Carter 33'; Kaylum Boshier 68'; Con: Josh Jacomb (3/4) 9', 34', 63'; Cards: Reuben O'Neill (yellow card) 80' |

Forsyth Barr Stadium, Dunedin
Attendance: 15,476
Referee: Angus Mabey (New Zealand)

21 February 2026
16:35 AWST (UTC+8)

| Force | 32–42 | Blues |
| Try: Harry Johnson-Holmes 12'; Carlo Tizzano 40+2'; Bayley Kuenzle 67'; Ben Donaldson 79'; Con: Ben Donaldson (3/4) 13', 40+3', 68'; Pen: Ben Donaldson (2/2) 29', 47'; Cards: Brandon Paenga-Amosa (yellow card) 20' | Report | Try: Josh Fusitu'a 6'; Stephen Perofeta 21'; Zarn Sullivan 42'; Torian Barnes 53'; Cole Forbes 60'; Josh Beehre 70'; Con: Stephen Perofeta (6/6) 7', 22', 43', 54', 61', 71' |

HIF Health Insurance Oval, Joondalup
Attendance: 5,131
Referee: Damon Murphy (Australia)

22 February 2026
15:35 NZDT (UTC+13)

| Crusaders | 24–50 | Brumbies |
| Try: David Havili 9'; George Bell 24'; Sevu Reece 57'; Leicester Faingaʻanuku 68'; Con: Taha Kemara (2/4) 10', 24'; Cards: Antonio Shalfoon (yellow card) 36'; Dominic Gardiner (yellow card) 60' | Report | Try: Andy Muirhead 19'; James Slipper 30'; Charlie Cale (2) 37', 59'; Kadin Pritchard 54'; Liam Bowron 73'; Rob Valetini 77'; Corey Toole 79'; Con: Ryan Lonergan (2/4) 20', 31'; Tane Edmed (3/4) 60', 78', 80'; Pen: Ryan Lonergan (0/1); Cards: Cadeyrn Neville (yellow card) 49' |

Apollo Projects Stadium, Christchurch
Referee: Ben O'Keeffe (New Zealand)

Bye/s: Reds

== Round 3 ==
27 February 2026
19:05 NZDT (UTC+13)

| Moana Pasifika | 19–35 | Force |
| Try: Mills Sanerivi 19'; Melani Matavao 75'; Allan Craig 80'; Con: Patrick Pellegrini (1/1) 21'; Jackson Garden-Bachop (1/2) 76' | Report | Try: Darby Lancaster 6'; Darcy Swain 33'; George Bridge 40+1'; Carlo Tizzano 62'; Leonel Oviedo 70'; Con: Ben Donaldson (5/5) 7', 34', 40+2', 63', 71' |

Navigation Homes Stadium, Pukekohe (Note: The venue for the round 3 match between Moana Pasifika and the Force on 27 February 2026 wasn't yet known at the time the schedule for the 2026 Super Rugby Pacific season was released. On 6 February 2026, Moana Pasifika announced that the game would be played at Navigation Homes Stadium, Pukekohe.)
Referee: Paul Williams (New Zealand)

27 February 2026
18:35 AEST (UTC+10)

| Reds | 31–14 | Highlanders |
| Try: Fraser McReight 18'; Matt Faessler 27'; Tim Ryan 35'; Lukhan Salakaia-Loto 57'; Vaiuta Latu 62'; Con: Louis Werchon (2/4) 20', 36'; Jock Campbell (1/1) 62' | Report | Try: Adam Lennox 31'; Lucas Casey 52'; Con: Cam Millar (2/2) 32', 53' |

Suncorp Stadium, Brisbane
Attendance: 13,016
Referee: Nic Berry (Australia)

28 February 2026
15:35 FJT (UTC+12)

| Drua | 25–20 | Hurricanes |
| Try: Motikai Murray 30'; Tuidraki Samusamuvodre 50'; Etonia Waqa 67'; Con: Isaiah Armstrong-Ravula (2/3) 31', 51'; Pen: Isaiah Armstrong-Ravula (2/2) 6', 39' | Report | Try: Fehi Fineanganofo 12'; Peter Lakai 25'; Billy Proctor 33'; Con: Jordie Barrett (1/3) 34'; Pen: Jordie Barrett (1/1) 49' |

Churchill Park, Lautoka
Referee: Ben O'Keeffe (New Zealand)

28 February 2026
19:05 NZDT (UTC+13)

| Chiefs | 33–43 | Crusaders |
| Try: Quinn Tupaea 5'; Etene Nanai-Seturo 8'; Samisoni Taukei'aho 22'; Tupou Vaa'i 73'; Emoni Narawa 80'; Con: Josh Jacomb (4/5) 6', 9', 23', 74' | Report | Try: George Bell 19'; Noah Hotham 26'; Christian Lio-Willie (3) 29', 52', 67'; David Havili 58'; Con: Taha Kemara (4/5) 20', 26', 29', 53'; Chay Fihaki (1/1) 68'; Pen: Taha Kemara (1/1) 40+2'; Cards: Noah Hotham (yellow card) 71' |

FMG Stadium Waikato, Hamilton
Attendance: 18,330
Referee: James Doleman (New Zealand)

28 February 2026
19:35 AEDT (UTC+11)

| Brumbies | 30–27 | Blues |
| Try: Declan Meredith 7'; Billy Pollard 22'; Luke Reimer 71'; Charlie Cale 80+2'; Con: Ryan Lonergan (1/2) 8'; Tane Edmed (1/2) 80+3'; Pen: Ryan Lonergan (2/2) 16', 43' | Report | Try: Caleb Clarke (2) 12', 50'; AJ Lam 30'; Dalton Papali'i 63'; Con: Stephen Perofeta (2/4) 13', 51'; Pen: Stephen Perofeta (1/1) 28'; Cards: Stephen Perofeta (yellow card) 71' |

GIO Stadium, Canberra
Attendance: 8,086
Referee: Angus Gardner (Australia)

Bye/s: Waratahs

== Round 4 – Club Round ==
6 March 2026
19:05 NZDT (UTC+13)

| Chiefs | 57–24 | Moana Pasifika |
| Try: Quinn Tupaea 3'; Liam Coombes-Fabling 5'; Leroy Carter (3) 16', 48', 54'; Emoni Narawa 30'; Lalakai Foketi 33'; Kyle Brown 61'; Tyrone Thompson 67'; Con: Damian McKenzie (6/9) 4', 6', 31', 55', 62', 67' | Report | Try: Glen Vaihu 10'; Semisi Tupou Ta'eiloa (2) 22', 43'; Tevita Ofa 79'; Con: Jackson Garden-Bachop (2/3) 11', 23'; Patrick Pellegrini (0/1) |

FMG Stadium Waikato, Hamilton
Attendance: 9,020
Referee: Todd Petrie (New Zealand)

6 March 2026
19:35 AEDT (UTC+11)

| Waratahs | 19–59 | Hurricanes |
| Try: Triston Reilly 13'; Max Jorgensen (2) 30', 62'; Con: Lawson Creighton (1/2) 14'; Sid Harvey (1/1) 63'; Cards: Angus Blyth (yellow card) 55'; George Poolman (yellow card) 66' | Report | Try: Asafo Aumua 15'; Peter Lakai 19'; Bailyn Sullivan (2) 33', 59'; Billy Proctor (3) 43', 47', 80'; Ere Enari 64'; Jone Rova 78'; Con: Jordie Barrett (4/6) 20', 44', 48', 60'; Callum Harkin (1/1) 65'; Lucas Cashmore (2/2) 79', 80+1' |

Allianz Stadium, Sydney
Attendance: 15,460
Referee: James Doleman (New Zealand)

7 March 2026
16:35 NZDT (UTC+13)

| Highlanders | 39–31 | Force |
| Try: Veveni Lasaqa 10'; Jonah Lowe (2) 28', 54'; Caleb Tangitau (2) 59', 70'; Con: Cam Millar (3/4) 11', 29', 55'; Reesjan Pasitoa (1/1) 71'; Pen: Cam Millar (1/2) 15'; Reesjan Pasitoa (1/1) 77' | Report | Try: Vaiolini Ekuasi 22'; Jeremy Williams 36'; Hamish Stewart 40'; Carlo Tizzano 65'; George Bridge 67'; Con: Ben Donaldson (3/3) 23', 37', 40+1'; Max Burey (0/2) |

Forsyth Barr Stadium, Dunedin
Attendance: 13,570
Referee: Ben O'Keeffe (New Zealand)

7 March 2026
19:05 NZDT (UTC+13)

| Blues | 29–13 | Crusaders |
| Try: Caleb Clarke (3) 4', 9', 49'; Cody Vai 22'; Con: Beauden Barrett (3/4) 5', 23', 50'; Pen: Beauden Barrett (1/2) 75'; Cards: Caleb Clarke (yellow card) 31' | Report | Try: Codie Taylor 33'; Rivez Reihana 37'; Con: Rivez Reihana (0/2); Pen: Rivez Reihana (1/1) 3'; Cards: Dominic Gardiner (yellow card) 7' |

Eden Park, Auckland
Attendance: 18,000
Referee: Nic Berry (Australia)

7 March 2026
19:35 AEDT (UTC+11)

| Brumbies | 31–34 | Reds |
| Try: Lachlan Shaw 3'; Charlie Cale (2) 9', 36'; Andy Muirhead 62'; Luke Reimer 73'; Con: Ryan Lonergan (3/5) 4', 37', 74' | Report | Try: Lachie Anderson 14'; Josh Flook 28'; Filipo Daugunu 79'; Carter Gordon 80+3'; Con: Louis Werchon (4/4) 15', 29', 80', 80+4'; Pen: Louis Werchon (2/2) 22', 40+1' |

GIO Stadium, Canberra
Referee: Damon Murphy (Australia)

Bye/s: Drua

== Round 5 ==
13 March 2026
19:05 NZDT (UTC+13)

| Hurricanes | 31–23 | Force |
| Try: Cam Roigard 35'; Brad Shields 49'; Devan Flanders 52'; Callum Harkin 60'; Warner Dearns 68'; Con: Jordie Barrett (3/5) 49', 53', 61'; Cards: Isaia Walker-Leawere (yellow card) 67' | Report | Try: Darby Lancaster (2) 28', 70'; Lopeti Faifua 75'; Con: Ben Donaldson (1/3) 75'; Pen: Ben Donaldson (2/2) 23', 45' |

McLean Park, Napier (Note: The venue for the round 5 match between the Hurricanes and the Force on 13 March 2026 wasn't yet known at the time the schedule for the 2026 Super Rugby Pacific season was released. On 9 October 2025, the Hurricanes announced that the game would be played at McLean Park, Napier.)
Referee: Todd Petrie (New Zealand)

14 March 2026
15:35 FJT (UTC+12)

| Drua | 42–27 | Brumbies |
| Try: Etonia Waqa 12'; Elia Canakaivata 37'; Sairusi Ravudi 45'; Ilaisa Droasese (2) 52', 71'; Con: Isaiah Armstrong-Ravula (4/5) 14', 38', 53', 72'; Pen: Isaiah Armstrong-Ravula (3/3) 6', 28', 68'; Cards: Mesake Doge (yellow card) 19'; Elia Canakaivata (yellow card) 26' | Report | Try: Hudson Creighton 7'; Toby MacPherson (2) 26', 55'; Ryan Lonergan 59'; Andy Muirhead 80+1'; Con: Tane Edmed (1/2) 26'; Ryan Lonergan (0/3) |

Four R Stadium, Ba
Attendance: 10,000
Referee: Paul Williams (New Zealand)

14 March 2026
19:05 NZDT (UTC+13)

| Crusaders | 29–18 | Highlanders |
| Try: Will Jordan 4'; Fletcher Newell 31'; Johnny Lee (2) 50', 56'; Con: Rivez Reihana (3/4) 32', 51', 57'; Pen: Rivez Reihana (1/1) 68'; Cards: Codie Taylor (yellow card) 14'; Finlay Brewis (yellow card) 37'; Chay Fihaki (yellow card) 60' | Report | Try: Tanielu Teleʻa 20'; Jacob Ratumaitavuki-Kneepkens 27'; Con: Cam Millar (1/2) 28'; Pen: Cam Millar (2/2) 36', 46' |

Apollo Projects Stadium, Christchurch
Referee: Jordan Way (Australia)

14 March 2026
18:35 AEST (UTC+10)

| Reds | 26–17 | Waratahs |
| Try: Harry Wilson 7'; Carter Gordon (2) 64', 75'; Isaac Henry 71'; Con: Louis Werchon (1/1) 8'; Jock Campbell (2/3) 72', 76' | Report | Try: Jamie Adamson 17'; Ioane Moananu 56'; Harry Potter 66'; Con: Sid Harvey (1/3) 18' |

Suncorp Stadium, Brisbane
Attendance: 18,087
Referee: Ben O'Keeffe (New Zealand)

15 March 2026
15:35 NZDT (UTC+13)

| Blues | 43–7 | Moana Pasifika |
| Try: Sam Nock 4'; AJ Lam 20'; Ofa Tuʻungafasi 29'; Marcel Renata 44'; Sam Darry 49'; Cody Vai 69'; Mason Tupaea 78'; Con: Beauden Barrett (4/7) 45', 50', 71', 79' | Report | Try: Mills Sanerivi 27'; Con: Patrick Pellegrini (1/1) 28'; Cards: Augustine Pulu (red card) 17'; William Havili (yellow card) 77' |

Eden Park, Auckland
Referee: James Doleman (New Zealand)

Bye/s: Chiefs

== Round 6 ==
20 March 2026
19:05 NZDT (UTC+13)

| Highlanders | 7–50 | Hurricanes |
| Try: Jacob Ratumaitavuki-Kneepkens 6'; Con: Reesjan Pasitoa (1/1) 7'; Cards: Veveni Lasaqa (yellow card) 61' | Report | Try: Cam Roigard (2) 14', 21'; Fehi Fineanganofo (3) 34', 62', 70'; Devan Flanders 50'; Bailyn Sullivan 66'; Peter Lakai 80'; Con: Ruben Love (5/8) 15', 21', 51', 67', 80+2'; Cards: Xavier Numia (yellow card) 54' |

Forsyth Barr Stadium, Dunedin
Attendance: 13,000
Referee: Angus Gardner (Australia)

20 March 2026
19:35 AEDT (UTC+11)

| Brumbies | 33–24 | Chiefs |
| Try: Hudson Creighton 5'; Ryan Lonergan 59'; Charlie Cale 64'; Declan Meredith 70'; Corey Toole 79'; Con: Ryan Lonergan (4/5) 6', 65', 71', 80' | Report | Try: Liam Coombes-Fabling (2) 17', 22'; Damian McKenzie 56'; Con: Damian McKenzie (3/3) 18', 23', 57'; Pen: Damian McKenzie (1/2) 40+1' |

GIO Stadium, Canberra
Referee: Nic Berry (Australia)

21 March 2026
15:35 FJT (UTC+12)

| Drua | 6–21 | Reds |
| Pen: Isaiah Armstrong-Ravula (2/3) 13', 30' | Report | Try: Kalani Thomas 25'; Harry McLaughlin-Phillips 55'; Richie Asiata 63'; Con: Harry McLaughlin-Phillips (3/3) 26', 56', 64'; Cards: Jock Campbell (yellow card) 43' |

Churchill Park, Lautoka
Referee: James Doleman (New Zealand)

21 March 2026
19:05 NZDT (UTC+13)

| Moana Pasifika | 21–50 | Crusaders |
| Try: Tevita Ofa 21'; Joel Lam 29'; Siaosi Nginingini 77'; Con: Patrick Pellegrini (3/3) 22', 30', 78' | Report | Try: Braydon Ennor 4'; Sevu Reece 17'; Chay Fihaki (2) 34', 73'; Leicester Faingaʻanuku 50'; George Bell (2) 53', 58'; Kurtis MacDonald 62'; Con: Cooper Grant (1/3) 18'; Chay Fihaki (4/5) 51', 54', 59', 63' |

North Harbour Stadium, Albany
Referee: Angus Mabey (New Zealand)

21 March 2026
19:35 AEDT (UTC+11)

| Waratahs | 20–35 | Blues |
| Try: Jack Debreczeni 31'; Tom Lambert 40+2'; Con: Sid Harvey (2/2) 32', 40+3'; Pen: Sid Harvey (2/2) 22', 44' | Report | Try: Finlay Christie 3'; Cody Vai 50'; AJ Lam (2) 57', 74'; Torian Barnes 80+1'; Con: Beauden Barrett (2/5) 58', 75'; Pen: Beauden Barrett (2/2) 39', 63'; Cards: Malachi Wrampling (yellow card) 6' |

Allianz Stadium, Sydney
Attendance: 14,316
Referee: Jordan Way (Australia)

Bye/s: Force

== Round 7 ==
27 March 2026
19:05 NZDT (UTC+13)

| Moana Pasifika | 19–39 | Highlanders |
| Try: Niko Jones 44'; Mills Sanerivi 53'; Allan Craig 58'; Con: Jackson Garden-Bachop (2/3) 45', 54'; Cards: William Havili (yellow card) 46'; Glen Vaihu (yellow card) 51' | Report | Try: Caleb Tangitau (2) 8', 27'; Jona Nareki 33'; Jack Taylor 38'; Nic Shearer 41'; Veveni Lasaqa 52'; Con: Reesjan Pasitoa (3/6) 29', 34', 52'; Pen: Reesjan Pasitoa (1/2) 21' |

North Harbour Stadium, Albany
Referee: Damon Murphy (Australia)

27 March 2026
19:35 AEDT (UTC+11)

| Brumbies | 28–30 | Waratahs |
| Try: Lachlan Shaw (2) 10', 46'; Charlie Cale 40+5'; Luke Reimer 79'; Con: Ryan Lonergan (3/3) 11', 40+6', 47'; Tane Edmed (1/1) 79' | Report | Try: Clem Halaholo 3'; Andrew Kellaway 17'; Joey Walton 29'; Con: Sid Harvey (3/3) 4', 18', 30'; Pen: Sid Harvey (3/3) 66', 70', 74'; Cards: Pete Samu (yellow card) 10' |

GIO Stadium, Canberra
Attendance: 8,486
Referee: Angus Gardner (Australia)

28 March 2026
16:35 NZDT (UTC+13)

| Hurricanes | 52–14 | Reds |
| Try: Cam Roigard 4'; Josh Moorby 15'; Fehi Fineanganofo (3) 18', 51', 55'; Bailyn Sullivan 28'; Warner Dearns 44'; Vernon Bason 74'; Con: Ruben Love (6/8) 5', 18', 45', 52', 56', 75' | Report | Try: Jock Campbell 7'; Isaac Henry 37'; Con: Harry McLaughlin-Phillips (2/2) 8', 38' |

Hnry Stadium, Wellington
Attendance: 11,721
Referee: Angus Mabey (New Zealand)

28 March 2026
19:05 NZDT (UTC+13)

| Blues | 40–15 | Drua |
| Try: Malachi Wrampling 7'; Bradley Slater (2) 20', 51'; Cody Vai 58'; Payton Spencer 65'; Caleb Clarke 80'; Con: Beauden Barrett (5/6) 7', 21', 52', 66', 80+1' | Report | Try: Etonia Waqa 17'; Mesake Vocevoce 36'; Con: Kemu Valetini (1/2) 18'; Pen: Kemu Valetini (1/1) 44' |

Eden Park, Auckland
Referee: Reuben Keane (Australia)

28 March 2026
16:35 AWST (UTC+8)

| Force | 14–24 | Chiefs |
| Try: Max Burey 31'; Jeremy Williams 49'; Con: Ben Donaldson (2/2) 32', 50' | Report | Try: Luke Jacobson 22'; Josh Jacomb 39'; Samisoni Taukei'aho 58'; Con: Damian McKenzie (3/3) 23', 40', 59'; Pen: Damian McKenzie (1/2) 79'; Cards: Ollie Norris (yellow card) 64' |

HBF Park, Perth
Attendance: 5,394
Referee: Marcus Playle (New Zealand)

Bye/s: Crusaders

== Round 8 ==
3 April 2026
19:05 NZDT (UTC+13)

| Crusaders | 69–26 | Drua |
| Try: Sevu Reece (2) 4', 23'; Leicester Faingaʻanuku 11'; Codie Taylor (4) 15', 19', 42', 48'; Chay Fihaki (2) 33', 61'; Corey Kellow 59'; Seb Calder 80+2'; Con: Taha Kemara (7/11) 16', 19', 24', 34', 43', 49', 62'; Cards: Johnny Lee (yellow card) 35' | Report | Try: Joseva Tamani 31'; Elia Canakaivata (2) 38', 45'; Manasa Mataele 54'; Con: Isaiah Armstrong-Ravula (3/4) 31', 46', 55' |

Apollo Projects Stadium, Christchurch
Referee: Paul Williams (New Zealand)

4 April 2026
19:05 NZDT (UTC+13)

| Chiefs | 42–14 | Waratahs |
| Try: Kyren Taumoefolau (2) 9', 77'; Samisoni Taukei'aho 28'; Quinn Tupaea (2) 38', 47'; Samipeni Finau 60'; Con: Josh Jacomb (3/6) 39', 48', 60'; Pen: Josh Jacomb (2/2) 16', 40+1' | Report | Try: Sid Harvey 32'; Pete Samu 69'; Con: Sid Harvey (2/2) 33', 70' |

FMG Stadium Waikato, Hamilton
Attendance: 11,475
Referee: James Doleman (New Zealand)

4 April 2026
18:35 AEST (UTC+10)

| Reds | 19–42 | Force |
| Try: Tim Ryan 17'; Joe Brial 24'; Filipo Daugunu 76'; Con: Jock Campbell (1/2) 18'; Harry McLaughlin-Phillips (1/1) 76'; Cards: Harry Wilson (yellow card) 54' | Report | Try: Franco Molina (3) 12', 32', 80+1'; Mac Grealy 40'; Darby Lancaster 50'; Brandon Paenga-Amosa 59'; Con: Ben Donaldson (6/6) 13', 33', 40+1', 51', 60', 80+2' |

Suncorp Stadium, Brisbane
Referee: Ben O'Keeffe (New Zealand)

Bye/s: Brumbies, Blues, Highlanders, Hurricanes, Moana Pasifika

== Round 9 ==
10 April 2026
19:05 NZST (UTC+12)

| Highlanders | 10–14 | Brumbies |
| Try: Jona Nareki 63'; Con: Cam Millar (1/1) 64'; Pen: Cam Millar (1/1) 23'; Cards: Henry Bell (yellow card) 72' | Report | Try: Ryan Lonergan 35'; Luke Reimer 75'; Con: Ryan Lonergan (2/2) 36', 76' |

Forsyth Barr Stadium, Dunedin
Attendance: 12,553
Referee: Ben O'Keeffe (New Zealand)

11 April 2026
14:00 NZST (UTC+12)

| Moana Pasifika | 17–62 | Chiefs |
| Try: Solomon Alaimalo 51'; Abraham Pole 69'; Miracle Faiʻilagi 72'; Con: Patrick Pellegrini (1/3) 52'; Cards: Tom Savage (yellow card) 40' | Report | Try: Quinn Tupaea (2) 5', 32'; Kyren Taumoefolau (2) 9', 55'; Samipeni Finau 18'; Damian McKenzie (2) 44', 64'; Tyrone Thompson (2) 48', 76'; Josh Jacomb 59'; Con: Damian McKenzie (6/10) 6', 10', 19', 56', 60', 76' |

Rotorua International Stadium, Rotorua (Note: The venue for the round 9 match between Moana Pasifika and the Chiefs on 11 April 2026 was scheduled to be held at Teufaiva Sport Stadium, Nuku'alofa, however on 23 February 2026 Moana Pasifika announced the match was being moved to an alternative venue. On 5 March 2026 the new venue was confirmed to be Rotorua International Stadium, Rotorua in New Zealand's Bay of Plenty Region.)
Referee: Marcus Playle (New Zealand)

11 April 2026
16:35 FJT (UTC+12)

| Drua | 24–22 | Force |
| Try: Penaia Cakobau 20'; Isaiah Armstrong-Ravula 29'; Isikeli Rabitu 34'; Isikeli Basiyalo 62'; Con: Isaiah Armstrong-Ravula (2/4) 21', 29'; Cards: Etonia Waqa (yellow card) 9'; Ilaisa Droasese (yellow card) 70' | Report | Try: Misinale Epenisa 10'; Dylan Pietsch 48'; Jeremy Williams 59'; Will Harris 71'; Con: Ben Donaldson (1/3) 11'; Kurtley Beale (0/1); Pen: Ben Donaldson (0/1) |

Churchill Park, Lautoka (Note: The venue for the round 9 match between the Drua and the Force on 11 April 2026 wasn't yet known at the time the schedule for the 2026 Super Rugby Pacific season was released. On 13 November 2025, the Drua announced that the game would be played at Churchill Park, Lautoka.)
Referee: Damon Murphy (Australia)

11 April 2026
19:05 NZST (UTC+12)

| Hurricanes | 42–19 | Blues |
| Try: Callum Harkin (2) 5', 65'; Billy Proctor 14'; Fehi Fineanganofo 34'; Asafo Aumua 47'; Cam Roigard 70'; Con: Ruben Love (6/6) 6', 15', 35', 48', 66', 71'; Cards: Fehi Fineanganofo (yellow card) 53'; Isaia Walker-Leawere (yellow card) 78' | Report | Try: AJ Lam 22'; Caleb Clarke 27'; Malachi Wrampling 54'; Con: Beauden Barrett (2/3) 23', 55' |

Hnry Stadium, Wellington
Attendance: 12,585
Referee: Nic Berry (Australia)

11 April 2026
19:35 AEST (UTC+10)

| Reds | 31–26 | Crusaders |
| Try: Fraser McReight 12'; Carter Gordon 16'; Tim Ryan 41'; Filipo Daugunu 74'; Louis Werchon 78'; Con: Jock Campbell (2/3) 13', 17'; Harry McLaughlin-Phillips (1/2) 79' | Report | Try: Christian Lio-Willie 5'; Chay Fihaki (2) 21', 80+1'; George Bell 53'; Con: Taha Kemara (1/2) 22'; Rivez Reihana (2/2) 54', 80+2' |

Suncorp Stadium, Brisbane
Attendance: 16,531
Referee: Angus Gardner (Australia)

Bye/s: Waratahs

== Round 10 ==
17 April 2026
19:05 NZST (UTC+12)

| Blues | 47–40 | Highlanders |
| Try: Hoskins Sotutu 10'; Anton Segner (2) 14', 48'; Sam Darry 27'; Bradley Slater 45'; Cole Forbes 62'; Ben Ake 71'; Con: Beauden Barrett (6/7) 11', 28', 46', 49', 63', 71'; Cards: Zarn Sullivan (yellow card) 33'; AJ Lam (yellow card) 75' | Report | Try: Adam Lennox (2) 3', 57'; Tanielu Teleʻa (2) 33', 76'; Xavier Tito-Harris 68'; Soane Vikena 78'; Con: Cam Millar (5/6) 4', 33', 58', 76', 79' |

Eden Park, Auckland
Referee: Jordan Way (Australia)

17 April 2026
19:35 AEST (UTC+10)

| Waratahs | 29–14 | Moana Pasifika |
| Try: Triston Reilly 16'; Sid Harvey (2) 25', 69'; Isaac Aedo Kailea 53'; Folau Fainga'a 80'; Con: Sid Harvey (2/5) 16', 80+1' | Report | Try: Melani Matavao (2) 5', 20'; Con: Patrick Pellegrini (2/2) 6', 21'; Cards: Glen Vaihu (yellow card) 8'; Tom Savage (yellow card) 53' |

Allianz Stadium, Sydney
Attendance: 10,727
Referee: Angus Mabey (New Zealand)

18 April 2026
19:05 NZST (UTC+12)

| Chiefs | 22–17 (a.e.t.) | Hurricanes |
| Try: Simon Parker 49'; Daniel Sinkinson 73'; Wallace Sititi 85'; Con: Damian McKenzie (2/2) 50', 73'; Pen: Damian McKenzie (1/2) 29' | Report | Try: Josh Moorby 9'; Peter Lakai 38'; Asafo Aumua 62'; Con: Ruben Love (1/3) 39' |

FMG Stadium Waikato, Hamilton
Referee: Ben O'Keeffe (New Zealand)

18 April 2026
19:35 AEST (UTC+10)

| Brumbies | 28–33 | Drua |
| Try: Nick Frost 13'; Ollie Sapsford 44'; Tane Edmed 64'; Corey Toole 70'; Con: Ryan Lonergan (3/3) 13', 45', 65'; Tane Edmed (1/1) 71' | Report | Try: Manasa Mataele (2) 15', 29'; Issak Fines-Leleiwasa 37'; Simione Kuruvoli 56'; Con: Isaiah Armstrong-Ravula (2/4) 30', 39'; Pen: Isaiah Armstrong-Ravula (3/3) 26', 51', 79'; Cards: Isikeli Rabitu (yellow card) 58' |

GIO Stadium, Canberra
Referee: James Doleman (New Zealand)

18 April 2026
19:55 AWST (UTC+8)

| Force | 31–26 | Crusaders |
| Try: Henry Robertson (2) 35', 45'; Zac Lomax 54'; Dylan Pietsch 63'; Harry Johnson-Holmes 71'; Con: Ben Donaldson (3/5) 36', 46', 72'; Cards: Nick Champion de Crespigny (yellow card) 16' | Report | Try: George Bell 5'; Leicester Faingaʻanuku 19'; Johnny McNicholl 22'; Noah Hotham 58'; Con: Taha Kemara (2/3) 6', 19'; Rivez Reihana (1/1) 59'; Cards: Tahlor Cahill (yellow card) 61' |

HBF Park, Perth
Attendance: 6,659
Referee: Reuben Keane (Australia)

Bye/s: Reds

== Round 11 – ANZAC Weekend; Super Round ==
24 April 2026
19:35 NZST (UTC+12)

| Crusaders | 35–20 | Waratahs |
| Try: Dallas McLeod (2) 12', 56'; Codie Taylor 40'; Leicester Faingaʻanuku 50'; Macca Springer 68'; Con: Taha Kemara (4/4) 12', 41', 50', 57'; Rivez Reihana (1/1) 69'; Cards: David Havili (yellow card) 59' | Report | Try: Sid Harvey 35'; Teddy Wilson 65'; Con: Sid Harvey (2/2) 36', 66'; Pen: Sid Harvey (2/2) 4', 9'; Cards: Miles Amatosero (yellow card) 30'; Ioane Moananu (yellow card) 49' |

One NZ Stadium, Christchurch
Attendance: 25,237
Referee: Nic Berry (Australia)

25 April 2026
17:05 NZST (UTC+12)

| Hurricanes | 45–12 | Brumbies |
| Try: Fehi Fineanganofo (4) 7', 20', 38', 58'; Josh Moorby (2) 50', 75'; Jone Rova 80'; Con: Ruben Love (5/7) 8', 21', 51', 59', 80+1' | Report | Try: David Feliuai 46'; Corey Toole 69'; Con: Tane Edmed (1/2) 69' |

One NZ Stadium, Christchurch
Referee: Paul Williams (New Zealand)

25 April 2026
19:35 NZST (UTC+12)

| Blues | 36–33 (a.e.t.) | Reds |
| Try: Zarn Sullivan (2) 7', 24'; Cole Forbes 15'; Dalton Papali'i 43'; Bradley Slater 63'; Con: Beauden Barrett (4/5) 8', 16', 25', 44'; Pen: Beauden Barrett (1/1) 84' | Report | Try: Fraser McReight 9'; Harry Wilson 32'; Jock Campbell 36'; Tim Ryan 75'; Louis Werchon 80'; Con: Harry McLaughlin-Phillips (3/3) 10', 33', 37'; Ben Volavola (1/2) 80+1' |

One NZ Stadium, Christchurch
Referee: James Doleman (New Zealand)

26 April 2026
14:00 NZST (UTC+12)

| Highlanders | 27–17 | Moana Pasifika |
| Try: Jonah Lowe 25'; Angus Taʻavao 48'; Adam Lennox 59'; Con: Cam Millar (3/3) 26', 49', 60'; Pen: Cam Millar (2/2) 43', 80+1'; Cards: Jonah Lowe (yellow card) 32' | Report | Try: Israel Leota 28'; Glen Vaihu 34'; Augustine Pulu 66'; Con: William Havili (1/3) 67'; Cards: Semisi Paea (yellow card) 20' |

One NZ Stadium, Christchurch
Referee: Todd Petrie (New Zealand)

26 April 2026
16:30 NZST (UTC+12)

| Chiefs | 42–22 | Drua |
| Try: Brodie McAlister 13'; Quinn Tupaea 16'; Jared Proffit 37'; Cortez Ratima 38'; Daniel Sinkinson 45'; Tepaea Cook-Savage 70'; Con: Damian McKenzie (6/6) 14', 17', 37', 39', 45', 70' | Report | Try: Mesake Doge 3'; Kavaia Tagivetaua 56'; Simione Kuruvoli 66'; Con: Isaiah Armstrong-Ravula (2/3) 4', 57'; Pen: Isaiah Armstrong-Ravula (1/1) 21' |

One NZ Stadium, Christchurch
Referee: Jordan Way (Australia)

Bye/s: Force

Notes:

- Super Round saw 73,187 fans coming through the gates.

== Round 12 ==
1 May 2026
19:05 NZST (UTC+12)

| Hurricanes | 38–31 | Crusaders |
| Try: Du'Plessis Kirifi 21'; Josh Moorby 36'; Cam Roigard 39'; Raymond Tuputupu 53'; Fehi Fineanganofo 65'; Con: Ruben Love (5/5) 22', 37', 39', 53', 65'; Pen: Ruben Love (1/1) 29' | Report | Try: Leicester Faingaʻanuku 8'; Noah Hotham 46'; Rivez Reihana 58'; Dominic Gardiner 77'; Con: Taha Kemara (1/1) 9'; Rivez Reihana (3/3) 47', 59', 77'; Pen: Taha Kemara (1/1) 34' |

Hnry Stadium, Wellington
Attendance: 15,507
Referee: James Doleman (New Zealand)

1 May 2026
19:35 AEST (UTC+10)

| Waratahs | 17–20 | Force |
| Try: Lawson Creighton 34'; Folau Fainga'a 75'; Con: Sid Harvey (2/2) 34', 76'; Pen: Sid Harvey (1/1) 37' | Report | Try: Dylan Pietsch (2) 40', 52'; Con: Ben Donaldson (2/2) 40+1', 53'; Pen: Ben Donaldson (2/2) 10', 69' |

Allianz Stadium, Sydney
Attendance: 10,096
Referee: Angus Gardner (Australia)

2 May 2026
16:00 FJT (UTC+12)

| Drua | 24–14 | Highlanders |
| Try: Virimi Vakatawa 10'; Isikeli Rabitu (2) 25', 43'; Elia Canakaivata 48'; Con: Isaiah Armstrong-Ravula (2/4) 11', 49'; Cards: Isikeli Rabitu (yellow card) 62' | Report | Try: Jonah Lowe 14'; Veveni Lasaqa 37'; Con: Cam Millar (2/2) 15', 38' |

Four R Stadium, Ba (Note: The venue for the round 12 match between the Drua and the Highlanders on 2 May 2026 wasn't yet known at the time the schedule for the 2026 Super Rugby Pacific season was released. On 13 November 2025, the Drua announced that the game would be played at Four R Stadium, Ba.)
Referee: Paul Williams (New Zealand)

2 May 2026
19:05 NZST (UTC+12)

| Moana Pasifika | 19–45 | Blues |
| Try: Mills Sanerivi (2) 14', 34'; Chris Apoua 72'; Con: William Havili (2/3) 35', 73' | Report | Try: Marcel Renata 24'; Kade Banks 39'; Patrick Tuipulotu 41'; James Mullan 48'; Stephen Perofeta 58'; Beauden Barrett 68'; Terrell Peita 77'; Con: Stephen Perofeta (4/5) 25', 40', 42', 49'; Beauden Barrett (1/2) 78' |

North Harbour Stadium, Albany
Referee: Nic Berry (Australia)

2 May 2026
19:35 AEST (UTC+10)

| Reds | 30–21 | Brumbies |
| Try: Lukhan Salakaia-Loto 7'; Josh Flook 39'; Seru Uru 60'; Con: Harry McLaughlin-Phillips (3/3) 8', 40', 61'; Pen: Harry McLaughlin-Phillips (2/2) 25', 42'; Ben Volavola (1/1) 67' | Report | Try: Lachlan Shaw 4'; Rob Valetini 45'; David Feliuai 54'; Con: Ryan Lonergan (3/3) 5', 45', 55'; Pen: Tane Edmed (0/1) |

Suncorp Stadium, Brisbane
Referee: Ben O'Keeffe (New Zealand)

Bye/s: Chiefs

== Round 13 ==
8 May 2026
19:05 NZST (UTC+12)

| Crusaders | 36–20 | Blues |
| Try: George Bower 13'; Jamie Hannah 23'; Rivez Reihana 45'; Kyle Preston 51'; Sevu Reece 61'; George Bell 77'; Con: Rivez Reihana (3/5) 24', 46', 61'; Cooper Grant (0/1); Cards: Kurtis MacDonald (red card) 67'; Jack Sexton (yellow card) 69' | Report | Try: AJ Lam 32'; Sam Nock 39'; Hoskins Sotutu 69'; Con: Stephen Perofeta (0/2); Beauden Barrett (1/1) 70'; Pen: Stephen Perofeta (1/1) 8' |

One NZ Stadium, Christchurch
Attendance: 25,000
Referee: Angus Gardner (Australia)

8 May 2026
19:35 AEST (UTC+10)

| Reds | 21–31 | Chiefs |
| Try: Lachie Anderson 8'; Joe Brial 65'; Treyvon Pritchard 74'; Con: Harry McLaughlin-Phillips (1/1) 9'; Louis Werchon (2/2) 66', 75'; Cards: Jeffery Toomaga-Allen (yellow card) 69' | Report | Try: Wallace Sititi (2) 11', 79'; Samisoni Taukei'aho (2) 51', 70'; Con: Damian McKenzie (4/4) 12', 52', 71', 79'; Pen: Damian McKenzie (1/2) 36' |

Suncorp Stadium, Brisbane
Attendance: 14,438
Referee: Marcus Playle (New Zealand)

9 May 2026
16:35 NZST (UTC+12)

| Highlanders | 31–26 | Waratahs |
| Try: Jonah Lowe (2) 6', 35'; Caleb Tangitau 11'; Jacob Ratumaitavuki-Kneepkens 19'; Con: Cam Millar (4/4) 7', 12', 20', 36'; Pen: Cam Millar (1/2) 80+1'; Cards: Timoci Tavatavanawai (yellow card) 22'; Jona Nareki (red card) 58' | Report | Try: Andrew Kellaway 23'; Apolosi Ranawai 45'; Clem Halaholo 70'; Sid Harvey 79'; Con: Sid Harvey (3/4) 24', 71', 79' |

Forsyth Barr Stadium, Dunedin
Attendance: 14,346
Referee: Damon Murphy (Australia)

9 May 2026
19:05 NZST (UTC+12)

| Moana Pasifika | 17–50 | Hurricanes |
| Try: Tuna Tuitama (2) 30', 73'; Israel Leota 63'; Con: William Havili (0/2); Jackson Garden-Bachop (1/1) 74' | Report | Try: Josh Moorby (4) 11', 22', 52', 69'; Du'Plessis Kirifi 29'; Kini Naholo (2) 57', 58'; Jone Rova 67'; Con: Callum Harkin (5/8) 12', 30', 59', 67', 69' |

North Harbour Stadium, Albany
Referee: Angus Mabey (New Zealand)

9 May 2026
19:35 AEST (UTC+10)

| Brumbies | 32–15 | Force |
| Try: Lachlan Shaw 2'; Ollie Sapsford 31'; Ryan Lonergan 53'; Chris Mickelson 75'; Con: Ryan Lonergan (3/4) 3', 32', 76'; Pen: Ryan Lonergan (2/2) 49', 73' | Report | Try: Harry Johnson-Holmes 17'; Carlo Tizzano 61'; Con: Ben Donaldson (1/2) 18'; Pen: Ben Donaldson (1/1) 30' |

GIO Stadium, Canberra
Referee: Nic Berry (Australia)

Bye/s: Drua

== Round 14 ==
15 May 2026
19:05 NZST (UTC+12)

| Chiefs | 42–12 | Highlanders |
| Try: Wallace Sititi 26'; Naitoa Ah Kuoi 31'; Samisoni Taukei'aho 36'; Xavier Roe 54'; Brodie McAlister 72'; Kyle Brown 80+4'; Con: Damian McKenzie (4/4) 27', 32', 37', 54'; Josh Jacomb (2/2) 73', 80+5' | Report | Try: Lucas Casey 19'; Jacob Ratumaitavuki-Kneepkens 57'; Con: Cam Millar (1/1) 20'; Taine Robinson (0/1); Pen: Cam Millar (0/1); Cards: Tomás Lavanini (yellow card) 29' |

FMG Stadium Waikato, Hamilton
Attendance: 13,082
Referee: Nic Berry (Australia)

16 May 2026
16:35 FJT (UTC+12)

| Drua | 35–50 | Waratahs |
| Try: Mesake Doge 22'; Elia Canakaivata 46'; Kitione Salawa 54'; Tuidraki Samusamuvodre 71'; Temo Mayanavanua 80+1'; Con: Isaiah Armstrong-Ravula (1/1) 23'; Kemu Valetini (4/4) 47', 54', 72', 80+2'; Cards: Isikeli Rabitu (yellow card) 34' | Report | Try: Harry Potter 5'; Ioane Moananu (2) 13', 44'; Max Jorgensen 19'; Sid Harvey 25'; Teddy Wilson 29'; Angus Scott-Young 36'; Apolosi Ranawai 62'; Con: Sid Harvey (2/5) 14', 20'; Jack Bowen (3/3) 37', 45', 63' |

HFC Bank Stadium, Suva (Note: The venue for the round 14 match between the Drua and the Hurricanes on 16 May 2026 wasn't yet known at the time the schedule for the 2026 Super Rugby Pacific season was released. On 8 September 2025, the Drua announced that the game would be played at HFC Bank Stadium, Suva.)
Referee: James Doleman (New Zealand)

16 May 2026
19:05 NZST (UTC+12)

| Blues | 24–47 | Hurricanes |
| Try: Malachi Wrampling 50'; AJ Lam 67'; Kurt Eklund 75'; Sam Darry 80'; Con: Beauden Barrett (1/1) 51'; Stephen Perofeta (1/3) 76' | Report | Try: Warner Dearns 9'; Jordie Barrett 11'; Pasilio Tosi 38'; Kini Naholo 55'; Fehi Fineanganofo 60'; Raymond Tuputupu 63'; Peter Lakai 80+2'; Con: Ruben Love (6/7) 9', 12', 39', 56', 64', 80+3'; Pen: Ruben Love (0/1); Cards: Jone Rova (yellow card) 79' |

Eden Park, Auckland
Referee: Ben O'Keeffe (New Zealand)

16 May 2026
17:35 AWST (UTC+8)

| Force | 19–14 | Reds |
| Try: Carlo Tizzano (2) 6', 55'; Mac Grealy 44'; Con: Max Burey (2/3) 7', 45' | Report | Try: Joe Brial 20'; Tim Ryan 51'; Con: Louis Werchon (2/2) 21', 52' |

HBF Park, Perth
Attendance: 6,203
Referee: Jordan Way (Australia)

Bye/s: Brumbies, Crusaders, Moana Pasifika

== Round 15 ==
22 May 2026
19:05 NZST (UTC+12)

| Crusaders | 36–32 | Chiefs |
| Try: Leicester Faingaʻanuku 19'; Jamie Hannah 29'; Christian Lio-Willie 37'; Johnny McNicholl (2) 51', 71'; David Havili 77'; Con: Rivez Reihana (1/3) 37'; Taha Kemara (2/3) 52', 78'; Pen: Taha Kemara (0/1) | Report | Try: Kyren Taumoefolau 5'; Samisoni Taukei'aho 24'; Josh Lord 33'; Quinn Tupaea 54'; Con: Josh Jacomb (3/4) 25', 35', 55'; Pen: Josh Jacomb (2/2) 44', 66' |

One NZ Stadium, Christchurch
Attendance: 25,000
Referee: James Doleman (New Zealand)

22 May 2026
19:35 AEST (UTC+10)

| Waratahs | 14–21 | Brumbies |
| Try: Isaac Aedo Kailea 63'; Max Jorgensen 70'; Con: Sid Harvey (2/2) 64', 71'; Cards: Charlie Gamble (yellow card) 31' | Report | Try: Billy Pollard 21'; Cadeyrn Neville 33'; Allan Alaalatoa 52'; Con: Ryan Lonergan (3/3) 22', 34', 53'; Cards: Lachlan Lonergan (yellow card) 58' |

Allianz Stadium, Sydney
Attendance: 15,550
Referee: Ben O'Keeffe (New Zealand)

23 May 2026
16:35 NZST (UTC+12)

| Moana Pasifika | 31–33 | Reds |
| Try: Augustine Pulu 2'; Semisi Tupou Ta'eiloa 49'; Penalty try 55'; Israel Leota 58'; Con: Patrick Pellegrini (3/3) 3', 50', 59'; Pen: Patrick Pellegrini (1/1) 76' | Report | Try: Tim Ryan (2) 11', 40+2'; Josh Canham 22'; Treyvon Pritchard 45'; Jock Campbell 78'; Con: Carter Gordon (3/4) 12', 23', 40+3'; Ben Volavola 79'; Cards: Joe Brial (yellow card) 55' |

North Harbour Stadium, Albany
Referee: Reuben Keane (Australia)

23 May 2026
19:05 NZST (UTC+12)

| Hurricanes | 45–28 | Highlanders |
| Try: Josh Moorby 2'; Kini Naholo (2) 9', 43'; Du'Plessis Kirifi 15'; Ruben Love 29'; Brayden Iose 52'; Ere Enari 59'; Con: Ruben Love (5/7) 3', 10', 16', 30', 44'; Cards: Ngane Punivai (yellow card) 41'; Pouri Rakete-Stones (yellow card) 66' | Report | Try: Jacob Ratumaitavuki-Kneepkens 25'; Timoci Tavatavanawai 40+1'; Adam Lennox 50'; Lucas Casey 68'; Con: Cam Millar (4/4) 26', 40+2', 51', 69'; Cards: Daniel Lienert-Brown (red card) 6'; Xavier Tito-Harris (yellow card) 42' |

Hnry Stadium, Wellington
Attendance: 13,537
Referee: Angus Gardner (Australia)

23 May 2026
17:35 AWST (UTC+8)

| Force | 19–15 | Drua |
| Try: Carlo Tizzano 10'; Vaiolini Ekuasi 51'; Zac Lomax 69'; Con: Max Burey (2/3) 11', 52' | Report | Try: Kitione Salawa 17'; Zuriel Togiatama 28'; Con: Kemu Valetini (1/2) 18'; Pen: Kemu Valetini (1/1) 64'; Cards: Maika Tuitubou (yellow card) 58' |

HBF Park, Perth
Attendance: 6,526
Referee: Paul Williams (New Zealand)

Bye/s: Blues

== Round 16 ==
29 May 2026
19:05 NZST (UTC+12)

| Crusaders | 47–14 | Hurricanes |
| Try: Sevu Reece (2) 9', 77'; Noah Hotham 25'; Johnny McNicholl 32'; Christian Lio-Willie 35'; Manumaua Letiu 63'; Kyle Preston 73'; Con: Taha Kemara (5/6) 10', 26', 33', 64', 74'; Sevu Reece (1/1) 78' | Report | Try: Brad Shields 13'; Pouri Rakete-Stones 71'; Con: Callum Harkin (2/2) 14', 71' |

One NZ Stadium, Christchurch
Attendance: 25,000
Referee: Nic Berry (Australia)

29 May 2026
19:35 AEST (UTC+10)

| Reds | 45–24 | Drua |
| Try: Matt Faessler (2) 25', 59'; Filipo Daugunu 30'; Josh Flook 34'; Harry Wilson 55'; Seru Uru 69'; Richie Asiata 74'; Con: Carter Gordon (5/6) 26', 31', 35', 56', 70'; Ben Volavola (0/1) | Report | Try: Manasa Mataele (3) 12', 45', 48'; Meli Tuni 38'; Con: Isaiah Armstrong-Ravula (1/2) 39'; Kemu Valetini (1/2) 46'; Pen: Kemu Valetini (0/1) |

Suncorp Stadium, Brisbane
Attendance: 15,623
Referee: James Doleman (New Zealand)

30 May 2026
14:35 AEST (UTC+10)

| Brumbies | 19–21 | Moana Pasifika |
| Try: Rory Scott 3'; Tom Wright 16'; Luke Reimer 55'; Con: Ryan Lonergan (2/3) 4', 17'; Cards: James Slipper (yellow card) 18' | Report | Try: Patrick Pellegrini (2) 20', 31'; Melani Matavao 73'; Con: Patrick Pellegrini (3/3) 21', 32', 74'; Cards: Faletoi Peni (yellow card) 35' (yellow-red card) 63' |

GIO Stadium, Canberra
Referee: Jordan Way (Australia)

30 May 2026
19:05 NZST (UTC+12)

| Chiefs | 59–34 | Blues |
| Try: Kyren Taumoefolau 27'; Tyrone Thompson 32'; Daniel Sinkinson (2) 37', 55'; Wallace Sititi 46'; Liam Coombes-Fabling 58'; Naitoa Ah Kuoi 63'; Reon Paul 68'; Samipeni Finau 74'; Con: Josh Jacomb (6/8) 33', 38', 47', 56', 59', 69'; Tepaea Cook-Savage (1/1) 75' | Report | Try: Torian Barnes 3'; AJ Lam 39'; Eli Oudenryn 53'; Caleb Clarke 70'; Xavi Taele 80+3'; Con: Zarn Sullivan (3/5) 4', 71', 80+5'; Pen: Zarn Sullivan (1/1) 25' |

FMG Stadium Waikato, Hamilton
Attendance: 19,950
Referee: Angus Gardner (Australia)

30 May 2026
17:35 AWST (UTC+8)

| Force | 31–25 | Waratahs |
| Try: Dylan Pietsch (2) 25', 35'; Misinale Epenisa 48'; Carlo Tizzano (2) 62', 73'; Con: Ben Donaldson (2/4) 26', 62'; Kurtley Beale (1/1) 73'; Pen: Kurtley Beale (0/1) | Report | Try: Ioane Moananu 14'; Harry Potter 29'; Apolosi Ranawai 67'; Con: Jack Bowen (2/2) 15', 30'; Jack Debreczeni (0/1); Pen: Jack Bowen (2/3) 21, 25'; Cards: Joey Walton (yellow card) 34' |

HBF Park, Perth
Attendance: 5,289
Referee: Marcus Playle (New Zealand)

Bye/s: Highlanders

== See also ==
- List of 2025 Super Rugby Pacific matches
