= 2026 Super Rugby Pacific season =

Men's rugby union club competition

- Dates: 13 February – 20 June 2026
- Countries: Australia (4 teams); Fiji (1 team); New Zealand (5 teams); Pacific Islands (1 team)
- Tournament format(s): Round-robin and knockout
- Champions: Hurricanes (2nd title)
- Matches played: 83
- Tries scored: 713 (8.59 per match)
- Top point scorer(s): Ruben Love, Hurricanes (138)
- Top try scorer(s): Fehi Fineanganofo, Hurricanes; Josh Moorby, Hurricanes (both 17)
- Official website: super.rugby/superrugby

The 2026 Super Rugby Pacific season (Note: Known as the Swyftx Super Rugby Pacific in Australia and Shop N Save Super Rugby Pacific in Fiji for sponsorship reasons.) was the 31st season of Super Rugby, an annual rugby union competition organised by SANZAAR between teams from Australia, Fiji, New Zealand and a combined team from Samoa, Tonga and other Pacific Island nations. It was the 30th anniversary of the competition, having been established in 1996. The fixtures were released on 28 August 2025 and featured the return of Super Round in Christchurch, New Zealand.

The defending champions were the Crusaders, who won their 13th title in 2025. The Hurricanes won the 2026 Super Rugby Pacific title, defeating the Chiefs emphatically in the final to win their second Super Rugby championship.

== Format and competition ==
Unchanged from last season (2025), eleven teams competed in a round-robin format, playing fourteen matches each (seven home, seven away), with two byes. Teams faced four "rivals" twice and six others once. The top six advanced to the qualifying finals: 1st vs 6th, 2nd vs 5th, and 3rd vs 4th. The winners and the highest-seeded losing team progressed to the semi-finals. Newly introduced for 2026, rather than losing one seeding rank as in the 2025 season, the highest-ranked losing team entered as the fourth seed, playing away in the semi-finals.

Standings were based on competition points: four for a win, two for a draw, and none for a loss. Bonus points were awarded for scoring three or more tries than the opponent or for losing by seven points or fewer.

=== Law changes ===
In February 2026, just weeks before the start of the season, it was revealed that some of the existing laws pertaining to restarts, kicking/territory, rucks, and the television match official (TMO), would be amended in order to reduce stoppages, keep the ball-in-play longer, and simplify the viewing experience. The law changes, as laid out by The Sydney Morning Herald, were:

- It will no longer be mandatory for the referee to issue a yellow or red card to a player on the defending team when awarding a penalty try. Any sanction will be at the discretion of the referee. (Law 8.3)
- Accidental offsides and teams delaying playing the ball away from a ruck will result in free kicks rather than scrums. (Law 10.5 and Law 15.17)
- After the referee has called "use it" at the ruck, no additional players from the team in possession may join the ruck. (Law 15.17)
- Teams will be permitted to pass the ball back into their half before kicking a 50:22. (Law 18.8a)
- Players will be allowed to take quick taps within one metre either side of the mark, or anywhere behind the mark, if they are within that two-metre channel running parallel to the touchlines. (Law 20.2)
- The television match official (TMO) will only intervene unprompted if the referee has overlooked an act of serious foul play (yellow card level or above), or a clear and obvious infringement leading to a try.

These changes were reported to have "emphatic support" amongst Super Rugby clubs, match officials and stakeholders. Sports news website Planet Rugby gave a positive assessment about law changes that give referees more discretion and help speed the game up, particularly removing the mandatory card for penalty tries, tightening the "use it" ruck law to kill caterpillars, and allowing more flexibility for quick taps.

== Teams and personnel ==
=== Overview ===
Union	Team	Stadia information		Coach	Captain
Union	Team	Stadia	Capacity	Coach	Captain
Australia	Brumbies	GIO Stadium, Canberra	25,011	Stephen Larkham	Allan Alaalatoa; Ryan Lonergan (Note: Lonergan was named team captain ahead of the first round, covering for team captain Allan Alaalatoa, who is out with injury.)
Australia	Force	HBF Park, Perth	20,500	Simon Cron	Jeremy Williams
Australia	Force	HIF Health Insurance Oval, Joondalup	16,000	Simon Cron	Jeremy Williams
Australia	Reds	Suncorp Stadium, Brisbane	52,500	Les Kiss	Fraser McReight
Australia	Waratahs	Allianz Stadium, Sydney	42,500	Dan McKellar	Matt Philip
Fiji	Drua	Churchill Park, Lautoka	11,000	Glen Jackson	Frank Lomani; Temo Mayanavanua
Fiji	Drua	Four R Stadium, Ba	13,500	Glen Jackson	Frank Lomani; Temo Mayanavanua
Fiji	Drua	HFC Bank Stadium, Suva	15,446	Glen Jackson	Frank Lomani; Temo Mayanavanua
New Zealand	Blues	Eden Park, Auckland	50,000	Vern Cotter	Patrick Tuipulotu; Dalton Papali'i (Note: Patrick Tuipulotu is not expected to return until Round 9 due to injury; Papali'i was named captain ahead of the first round.)
New Zealand	Chiefs	FMG Stadium Waikato, Hamilton	25,800	Jono Gibbes	Luke Jacobson
New Zealand	Crusaders	Apollo Projects Stadium, Christchurch	17,104	Rob Penney	David Havili
New Zealand	Crusaders	One NZ Stadium, Christchurch	30,000	Rob Penney	David Havili
New Zealand	Highlanders	Forsyth Barr Stadium, Dunedin	30,748	Jamie Joseph	Hugh Renton; Timoci Tavatavanawai
New Zealand	Hurricanes	Wellington Regional Stadium, Wellington (Note: Known as Sky Stadium from 2020 until 28 February 2026 and as Hnry Stadium from 1 March 2026 onwards.)	34,500	Clark Laidlaw	Jordie Barrett; Du'Plessis Kirifi
New Zealand	Hurricanes	McLean Park, Napier	19,700	Clark Laidlaw	Jordie Barrett; Du'Plessis Kirifi
Pacific Islands (Note: Although based in Auckland, New Zealand, the Moana Pasifika holds no official relationship with New Zealand Rugby (NZR) and was established to "create opportunities" to players from Pacific Islands countries. They often play one or two matches per season in Tonga and/or Samoa. Furthermore, the team is owned by Pasifika Medical Association Group (PMAG), a medical provider based in New Zealand.)	Moana Pasifika	North Harbour Stadium, Albany	14,000	Tana Umaga	Miracle Faiʻilagi
Pacific Islands	Moana Pasifika	Navigation Homes Stadium, Pukekohe	12,000	Tana Umaga	Miracle Faiʻilagi
Pacific Islands	Moana Pasifika	Rotorua International Stadium, Rotorua	26,000	Tana Umaga	Miracle Faiʻilagi

=== Locations ===
2026 Super Rugby Pacific season (Oceania)
Home locations of all the 2026 Super Rugby teams

== Regular season ==
=== Standings ===
2026 Super Rugby Pacific standings
Pos	Team	Pld	W	D	L	PF	PA	PD	TF	TA	TB	LB	Pts	Qualification
1	Hurricanes (C)	14	11	0	3	562	298	+264	86	44	9	2	55	Qualifying finals
2	Chiefs (RU)	14	11	0	3	515	325	+190	75	49	6	1	51	Qualifying finals
3	Crusaders	14	8	0	6	488	388	+100	73	55	5	4	41	Qualifying finals
4	Blues	14	8	0	6	456	412	+44	68	60	4	2	38	Qualifying finals
5	Reds	14	8	0	6	364	386	−22	53	56	3	2	37	Qualifying finals
6	Brumbies	14	7	0	7	402	373	+29	60	48	2	4	34	Qualifying finals
7	Force	14	7	0	7	358	383	−25	52	54	1	1	30	
8	Waratahs	14	5	0	9	353	402	−49	50	57	4	4	28	
9	Highlanders	14	5	0	9	327	424	−97	44	64	1	3	24	
10	Drua	14	5	0	9	330	473	−143	45	74	0	1	21	
11	Moana Pasifika	14	2	0	12	276	567	−291	43	88	0	1	9	

Source: Super Rugby
(C) Champions; (RU) Runners-up.

Competition rules
Competition points breakdown:
* 4 competition points for a win
* 2 competition points for a draw
* 1 competition bonus point for a loss by seven points or less
* 1 competition bonus point for scoring at least three tries more than the opponent in a match
Tiebreaker rules:
If, at any stage, teams have the same number of competition points, the following tiebreaker rules apply (in this order) to determine their standing:
* Most wins from all matches
* Highest difference between total points for and total points against from all matches (points difference)
* Most tries scored from all matches
* Highest difference between total tries for and total tries against from all matches
* Coin toss

=== Round-by-round ===
The table below shows each team's progression throughout the season. For each round, their cumulative points total is shown with the overall log position in brackets:

Team progression
Team	R1	R2	R3	R4	R5	R6	R7	R8	R9	R10	R11 (SR)	R12	R13	R14	R15	R16	QF	SF	Final
Blues	1 (7th)	5 (5th)	6 (5th)	10 (4th)	15 (2nd)	20 (2nd)	25 (2nd)	25 (2nd)	25 (3rd)	29 (3rd)	33 (3rd)	38 (2nd)	38 (3rd)	38 (3rd)	38 (3rd)	38 (4th)	Lost	Lost	DNQ
Brumbies	5 (1st)	10 (1st)	14 (1st)	15 (1st)	15 (3rd)	19 (3rd)	20 (3rd)	20 (4th)	24 (4th)	25 (4th)	25 (5th)	25 (6th)	29 (5th)	29 (5th)	33 (5th)	34 (6th)	Lost	DNQ	DNQ
Chiefs	4 (4th)	8 (3rd)	8 (3rd)	13 (2nd)	13 (4th)	13 (6th)	17 (5th)	22 (3rd)	27 (2nd)	31 (1st)	36 (1st)	36 (3rd)	40 (2nd)	45 (2nd)	46 (2nd)	51 (2nd)	Won	Won	Lost
Crusaders	1 (6th)	1 (8th)	5 (7th)	5 (8th)	9 (8th)	14 (5th)	14 (6th)	19 (5th)	20 (6th)	21 (6th)	26 (4th)	27 (5th)	32 (4th)	32 (4th)	36 (4th)	41 (3rd)	Won	Lost	DNQ
Drua	0 (9th)	0 (10th)	4 (10th)	4 (9th)	8 (9th)	8 (9th)	8 (9th)	8 (10th)	12 (9th)	16 (8th)	16 (9th)	20 (7th)	20 (9th)	20 (10th)	21 (10th)	21 (10th)	DNQ	DNQ	DNQ
Force	0 (11th)	0 (11th)	4 (9th)	4 (10th)	4 (10th)	4 (10th)	4 (10th)	9 (9th)	10 (10th)	14 (10th)	14 (10th)	18 (10th)	18 (10th)	22 (9th)	26 (8th)	30 (7th)	DNQ	DNQ	DNQ
Highlanders	4 (5th)	5 (6th)	5 (8th)	9 (7th)	9 (7th)	9 (8th)	14 (8th)	14 (8th)	15 (7th)	16 (9th)	20 (7th)	20 (9th)	24 (7th)	24 (8th)	24 (9th)	24 (9th)	DNQ	DNQ	DNQ
Hurricanes	0 (8th)	5 (4th)	6 (4th)	11 (3rd)	15 (1st)	20 (1st)	25 (1st)	25 (1st)	30 (1st)	31 (2nd)	36 (2nd)	40 (1st)	45 (1st)	50 (1st)	55 (1st)	55 (1st)	Won	Won	Won
Moana Pasifika	4 (3rd)	4 (7th)	4 (11th)	4 (11th)	4 (11th)	4 (11th)	4 (11th)	4 (11th)	4 (11th)	4 (11th)	4 (11th)	4 (11th)	4 (11th)	4 (11th)	5 (11th)	9 (11th)	DNQ	DNQ	DNQ
Reds	0 (10th)	0 (9th)	5 (6th)	9 (6th)	13 (5th)	18 (4th)	18 (4th)	18 (6th)	22 (5th)	22 (5th)	23 (6th)	27 (4th)	27 (6th)	28 (6th)	32 (6th)	37 (5th)	Lost	DNQ	DNQ
Waratahs	5 (2nd)	10 (2nd)	10 (2nd)	10 (5th)	10 (6th)	10 (7th)	14 (7th)	14 (7th)	14 (8th)	19 (7th)	19 (8th)	20 (8th)	21 (8th)	26 (7th)	27 (7th)	28 (8th)	DNQ	DNQ	DNQ
Key:	Win	Draw	Loss	Bye	DNQ = Did not qualify														

=== Matches ===
Home \ Away	BLU	BRU	CHI	CRU	DRU	FOR	HIG	HUR	MOA	RED	WAR
Blues	—		15–19	29–13	40–15		47–40	24–47	43–7	36–33	
Brumbies	30–27	—	33–24		28–33	32–15			19–21	31–34	28–30
Chiefs	59–34		—	33–43	42–22		42–12	22–17	57–24		42–14
Crusaders	36–20	24–50	36–32	—	69–26		29–18	47–14			35–20
Drua		42–27			—	24–22	24–14	25–20	26–40	6–21	35–50
Force	32–42	24–56	14–24	31–26	19–15	—				19–14	31–25
Highlanders		10–14	23–26	25–23		39–31	—	7–50	27–17		31–26
Hurricanes	42–19	45–12		38–31		31–23	45–28	—	52–10	52–14	
Moana Pasifika	19–45		17–62	21–50		19–35	19–39	17–50	—	31–33	
Reds		30–21	21–31	31–26	45–24	19–42	31–14			—	26–17
Waratahs	20–35	14–21			36–13	17–20		19–59	29–14	36–12	—

Source: Super Rugby
Legend: Blue = home team win; Yellow = draw; Red = away team win.

== Finals series ==
Qualifying finals
5 June 2026 – Wellington
Hurricanes	66
Brumbies	12
6 June 2026 – Christchurch
Crusaders	52
Blues	31
6 June 2026 – Hamilton
Chiefs	46
Reds	24

Semi-finals
13 June 2026 – Wellington
Hurricanes	57
Blues	21
12 June 2026 – Hamilton
Chiefs	49
Crusaders	12

Final
20 June 2026 – Wellington
Hurricanes	60
Chiefs	5

=== Qualifying finals ===
5 June 2026
19:05 NZST (UTC+12)

Hurricanes	66–12	Brumbies
Try: Caleb Delany 7'; Cam Roigard (2) 10', 39'; Billy Proctor 28'; Warner Dearns (2) 32', 48'; Ngane Punivai (3) 60', 71', 77'; Con: Ruben Love (9/9) 8', 11', 29', 33', 39', 48', 61', 72', 78'; Pen: Ruben Love (1/1) 15'	Report	Try: Corey Toole 35'; Tane Edmed 52'; Con: Ryan Lonergan (1/2) 36'

Hnry Stadium, Wellington
Attendance: 10,393
Referee: Ben O'Keeffe (New Zealand)

6 June 2026
16:35 NZST (UTC+12)

Crusaders	52–31	Blues
Try: Sevu Reece 12'; Johnny McNicholl (3) 21', 50', 63'; David Havili 30'; Chay Fihaki 33'; Taha Kemara 38'; Manumaua Letiu 74'; Con: Taha Kemara (5/6) 13', 21', 31', 38', 50'; Rivez Reihana (1/2) 64'	Report	Try: Sam Nock 3'; Anton Segner 27'; Xavi Taele 54'; Payton Spencer 69'; Caleb Clarke 77'; Con: Zarn Sullivan (3/3) 3', 28', 54'; Xavi Taele (0/2); Cards: Malachi Wrampling (red card) 19'

One NZ Stadium, Christchurch
Attendance: 25,000
Referee: Nic Berry (Australia)

6 June 2026
19:05 NZST (UTC+12)

Chiefs	46–24	Reds
Try: Kyren Taumoefolau (2) 7', 40'; Samisoni Taukei'aho 19'; Damian McKenzie (2) 47', 65'; Isaac Hutchinson 79'; Con: Damian McKenzie (5/6) 20', 40+1', 47', 66', 80'; Pen: Damian McKenzie (2/2) 3', 73'; Cards: Kyle Brown (yellow card) 32'	Report	Try: Lukhan Salakaia-Loto 6'; Aidan Ross 27'; Matt Faessler 69'; Con: Carter Gordon (3/3) 6', 28', 70'; Pen: Carter Gordon (1/1) 35'; Cards: Lukhan Salakaia-Loto (yellow card) 18'

FMG Stadium Waikato, Hamilton
Attendance: 11,787
Referee: James Doleman (New Zealand)

=== Semi-finals ===
12 June 2026
19:05 NZST (UTC+12)

Chiefs	49–12	Crusaders
Try: Kyren Taumoefolau (2) 12', 16'; Isaac Hutchinson 20'; Samisoni Taukei'aho 24'; Leroy Carter 30'; Tupou Vaa'i 33'; Xavier Roe 79'; Con: Damian McKenzie (7/7) 13', 16', 21', 25', 31', 34', 80'; Cards: Liam Coombes-Fabling (yellow card) 64'	Report	Try: Chay Fihaki 26'; David Havili 63'; Con: Taha Kemara (0/1); Rivez Reihana (1/1) 63'

FMG Stadium Waikato, Hamilton
Attendance: 22,000
Referee: Angus Gardner (Australia)

13 June 2026
19:05 NZST (UTC+12)

Hurricanes	57–21	Blues
Try: Jordie Barrett 3'; Du'Plessis Kirifi 14'; Xavier Numia 31'; Cam Roigard 43'; Josh Moorby (2) 47', 79'; Asafo Aumua 53'; Ere Enari 65'; Kini Naholo 71'; Con: Ruben Love (3/5) 14', 31', 48'; Jordie Barrett (3/4) 54', 65', 72'	Report	Try: Patrick Tuipulotu 7'; Payton Spencer 26'; Eli Oudenryn 75'; Con: Beauden Barrett (3/3) 8', 27', 76'

Hnry Stadium, Wellington
Attendance: 22,619
Referee: Ben O'Keeffe (New Zealand)

=== Final ===
20 June 2026
19:05 NZST (UTC+12)

Hurricanes	60–5	Chiefs
Try: Josh Moorby (2) 7', 44'; Ruben Love (2) 14', 67'; Fehi Fineanganofo 24'; Callum Harkin 38'; Devan Flanders 48'; Jordie Barrett 54'; Jone Rova 78'; Con: Ruben Love (6/9) 15', 25', 39', 45', 55', 79'; Pen: Ruben Love (1/1) 40+2'	Report	Try: Naitoa Ah Kuoi 75'

Hnry Stadium, Wellington
Attendance: 33,022
Referee: Nic Berry (Australia)

== Statistics ==
As of 20 June 2026.

=== Leading point scorers ===
No.	Player	Team	Points	Average	Details
1	Ruben Love	Hurricanes	138	11.50	3 T, 57 C, 3 P, 0 D
2	Damian McKenzie	Chiefs	135	12.27	5 T, 46 C, 6 P, 0 D
3	Ryan Lonergan	Brumbies	107	7.13	5 T, 35 C, 4 P, 0 D
4	Sid Harvey	Waratahs	98	8.91	6 T, 22 C, 8 P, 0 D
5	Ben Donaldson	Force	93	7.75	1 T, 32 C, 8 P, 0 D
6	Cam Millar	Highlanders	91	7.58	0 T, 29 C, 11 P, 0 D
7	Fehi Fineanganofo	Hurricanes	85	6.07	17 T, 0 C, 0 P, 0 D
7	Josh Moorby	Hurricanes	85	5.31	17 T, 0 C, 0 P, 0 D
9	Isaiah Armstrong-Ravula	Drua	84	6.46	1 T, 20 C, 13 P, 0 D
10	Taha Kemara	Crusaders	82	6.31	1 T, 34 C, 3 P, 0 D

=== Leading try scorers ===
No.	Player	Team	Tries	Average
1	Fehi Fineanganofo	Hurricanes	17	1.21
1	Josh Moorby	Hurricanes	17	1.06
3	Samisoni Taukei'aho	Chiefs	12	0.86
4	Kyren Taumoefolau	Chiefs	10	0.77
4	Carlo Tizzano	Force	10	0.83
6	Charlie Cale	Brumbies	9	1.00
6	Caleb Clarke	Blues	9	0.64
6	Cam Roigard	Hurricanes	9	0.64
9	Chay Fihaki	Crusaders	8	0.67
9	Max Jorgensen	Waratahs	8	0.57
9	AJ Lam	Blues	8	0.50
9	Sevu Reece	Crusaders	8	0.57
9	Tim Ryan	Reds	8	0.62
9	Quinn Tupaea	Chiefs	8	0.53

=== Discipline ===
Player	Team	Red	Yellow	Round (vs. opponent)
Jona Nareki	Highlanders	1	1	Round 13 (vs. Waratahs); Round 2 (vs. Chiefs)
Faletoi Peni	Moana Pasifika	1	1	Round 16 (vs. Brumbies); Round 16 (vs. Brumbies)
Malachi Wrampling	Blues	1	1	Qualifying Final (vs. Crusaders); Round 6 (vs. Waratahs)
Daniel Lienert-Brown	Highlanders	1	0	Round 15 (vs. Hurricanes)
Kurtis MacDonald	Crusaders	1	0	Round 13 (vs. Blues)
Augustine Pulu	Moana Pasifika	1	0	Round 5 (vs. Blues)
Isikeli Rabitu	Drua	0	3	Round 10 (vs. Brumbies); Round 12 (vs. Highlanders); Round 14 (vs. Waratahs)
Dominic Gardiner	Crusaders	0	2	Round 2 (vs. Brumbies); Round 4 (vs. Blues)
William Havili	Moana Pasifika	0	2	Round 5 (vs. Blues); Round 7 (vs. Highlanders)
Tom Savage	Moana Pasifika	0	2	Round 9 (vs. Chiefs); Round 10 (vs. Waratahs)
Glen Vaihu	Moana Pasifika	0	2	Round 7 (vs. Highlanders); Round 10 (vs. Waratahs)
Isaia Walker-Leawere	Hurricanes	0	2	Round 5 (vs. Force); Round 9 (vs. Blues)
Tevita Alatini	Brumbies	0	1	Round 1 (vs. Force)
Miles Amatosero	Waratahs	0	1	Round 11 (vs. Crusaders)
Henry Bell	Highlanders	0	1	Round 9 (vs. Brumbies)
Angus Blyth	Waratahs	0	1	Round 4 (vs. Hurricanes)
Kaylum Boshier	Chiefs	0	1	Round 1 (vs. Blues)
Finlay Brewis	Crusaders	0	1	Round 5 (vs. Highlanders)
Joe Brial	Reds	0	1	Round 15 (vs. Moana Pasifika)
Kyle Brown	Chiefs	0	1	Qualifying Final (vs. Reds)
Tahlor Cahill	Crusaders	0	1	Round 10 (vs. Force)
Jock Campbell	Reds	0	1	Round 6 (vs. Drua)
Elia Canakaivata	Drua	0	1	Round 5 (vs. Brumbies)
Nick Champion de Crespigny	Force	0	1	Round 10 (vs. Crusaders)
Caleb Clarke	Blues	0	1	Round 4 (vs. Crusaders)
Liam Coombes-Fabling	Chiefs	0	1	Semi-final (vs. Crusaders)
Mesake Doge	Drua	0	1	Round 5 (vs. Brumbies)
Ilaisa Droasese	Drua	0	1	Round 9 (vs. Force)
Chay Fihaki	Crusaders	0	1	Round 5 (vs. Highlanders)
Fehi Fineanganofo	Hurricanes	0	1	Round 9 (vs. Blues)
Charlie Gamble	Waratahs	0	1	Round 15 (vs. Brumbies)
David Havili	Crusaders	0	1	Round 11 (vs. Waratahs)
Noah Hotham	Crusaders	0	1	Round 3 (vs. Chiefs)
AJ Lam	Blues	0	1	Round 10 (vs. Highlanders)
Veveni Lasaqa	Highlanders	0	1	Round 6 (vs. Hurricanes)
Vaiuta Latu	Reds	0	1	Round 1 (vs. Waratahs)
Tomás Lavanini	Highlanders	0	1	Round 14 (vs. Chiefs)
Johnny Lee	Crusaders	0	1	Round 8 (vs. Drua)
Lachlan Lonergan	Brumbies	0	1	Round 15 (vs. Waratahs)
Jonah Lowe	Highlanders	0	1	Round 11 (vs. Moana Pasifika)
Ioane Moananu	Waratahs	0	1	Round 11 (vs. Crusaders)
Cadeyrn Neville	Brumbies	0	1	Round 2 (vs. Crusaders)
Sam Nock	Blues	0	1	Round 1 (vs. Chiefs)
Ollie Norris	Chiefs	0	1	Round 7 (vs. Force)
Xavier Numia	Hurricanes	0	1	Round 6 (vs. Highlanders)
Reuben O'Neill	Chiefs	0	1	Round 2 (vs. Highlanders)
Semisi Paea	Moana Pasifika	0	1	Round 11 (vs. Highlanders)
Brandon Paenga-Amosa	Force	0	1	Round 2 (vs. Blues)
Stephen Perofeta	Blues	0	1	Round 3 (vs. Brumbies)
George Poolman	Waratahs	0	1	Round 4 (vs. Hurricanes)
Ngane Punivai	Hurricanes	0	1	Round 15 (vs. Highlanders)
Pouri Rakete-Stones	Hurricanes	0	1	Round 15 (vs. Highlanders)
Jone Rova	Hurricanes	0	1	Round 14 (vs. Blues)
Lukhan Salakaia-Loto	Reds	0	1	Qualifying Final (vs. Chiefs)
Pete Samu	Waratahs	0	1	Round 7 (vs. Brumbies)
Jack Sexton	Crusaders	0	1	Round 13 (vs. Blues)
Antonio Shalfoon	Crusaders	0	1	Round 2 (vs. Brumbies)
James Slipper	Brumbies	0	1	Round 16 (vs. Moana Pasifika)
Zarn Sullivan	Blues	0	1	Round 10 (vs. Highlanders)
Timoci Tavatavanawai	Highlanders	0	1	Round 13 (vs. Waratahs)
Codie Taylor	Crusaders	0	1	Round 5 (vs. Highlanders)
Xavier Tito-Harris	Highlanders	0	1	Round 15 (vs. Hurricanes)
Jeffery Toomaga-Allen	Reds	0	1	Round 13 (vs. Chiefs)
Maika Tuitubou	Drua	0	1	Round 15 (vs. Force)
Mesake Vocevoce	Drua	0	1	Round 1 (vs. Moana Pasifika)
Joey Walton	Waratahs	0	1	Round 16 (vs. Force)
Etonia Waqa	Drua	0	1	Round 9 (vs. Force)
Harry Wilson	Reds	0	1	Round 8 (vs. Force)

== Awards ==
=== Player of the Year ===
Player of the Year Award
Player	Votes	Position	Team	Winner
Ben Donaldson	39	Fly-half	Force	Quinn Tupaea (Chiefs)
Max Jorgensen	39	Fullback / Wing	Waratahs	Quinn Tupaea (Chiefs)
Anton Segner	41	Loose forward	Blues	Quinn Tupaea (Chiefs)
Timoci Tavatavanawai	43 (Note: Despite Timoci Tavatavanawai and Quinn Tupaea being equal on 43 votes, the latter was awarded the Player of the Year award "via the tiebreaker of receiving more 'three votes' from the independent media panel across the season.")	Midfielder	Highlanders	Quinn Tupaea (Chiefs)
Quinn Tupaea	43	Midfielder	Chiefs	Quinn Tupaea (Chiefs)

=== Team of the Year ===
Team of the Year
Pos.	Player
1	Ethan de Groot (Highlanders)
2	Samisoni Taukei'aho (Chiefs)
3	Xavier Numia (Hurricanes)
4	Jeremy Williams (Force)
5	Lukhan Salakaia-Loto (Reds)
BR	Anton Segner (Blues)
BR	Leicester Faingaʻanuku (Crusaders)
BR	Fraser McReight (Reds)
9	Ryan Lonergan (Brumbies)
10	Ben Donaldson (Force)
11	Max Jorgensen (Waratahs)
12	Quinn Tupaea (Chiefs)
13	Timoci Tavatavanawai (Highlanders)
14	Caleb Tangitau (Highlanders)
15	Jock Campbell (Reds)

== Players ==
=== Squads ===
The following squads have been named. Players listed as WTG are players named in the wider training groups. Players listed as Dev are players named in development groups. Players listed in italics denote non-original squad members:

Blues squad
Forwards	Ben Ake • Torian Barnes • Josh Beehre • Che Clark • Tristyn Cook • Sam Darry • Kurt Eklund • Josh Fusitu'a • Sam Matenga • Laghlan McWhannell • Jed Melvin • James Mullan • Eli Oudenryn • Dalton Papali'i • Terrell Peita • Marcel Renata • Anton Segner • Bradley Slater • Hoskins Sotutu • Patrick Tuipulotu • Mason Tupaea • Ofa Tuʻungafasi • Malachi Wrampling • Flyn Yates • Did not play • Cam Christie • Jordan Lay • Cameron Suafoa
Backs	Pita Ahki • Kade Banks • Beauden Barrett • Finlay Christie • Caleb Clarke • Corey Evans • Cole Forbes • Taufa Funaki • AJ Lam • Sam Nock • Stephen Perofeta • Payton Spencer • Zarn Sullivan • Xavi Taele • Cody Vai • Did not play • James Cameron • Rico Simpson
WTG	Torian Barnes • Sam Matenga • Jed Melvin • Eli Oudenryn • Mason Tupaea • Did not play • Hemopo Cunningham • Tima Faingaʻanuku • Esile Fono • Leo Gordon • Jack Lee • Josh Renton • Harlyn Saunoa
Coach	Vern Cotter

Brumbies squad
Forwards	Allan Alaalatoa • Tevita Alatini • Liam Bowron • Darcy Breen • Charlie Cale • Nick Frost • Lington Ieli • Lachlan Lonergan • Toby MacPherson • Chris Mickelson • Cadeyrn Neville • Billy Pollard • Luke Reimer • Blake Schoupp • Rory Scott • Lachlan Shaw • James Slipper • Tuaina Taii Tualima • Rob Valetini • Rhys van Nek • Did not play • Harvey Cordukes
Backs	Austin Anderson • Hudson Creighton • Tane Edmed • David Feliuai • Ryan Lonergan • Jarrah McLeod • Declan Meredith • Andy Muirhead • Kye Oates • Kadin Pritchard • Ollie Sapsford • Klayton Thorn • Corey Toole • Tom Wright • Did not play • Joe Dillon • Dan Nelson • Shane Wilcox
Coach	Stephen Larkham

Chiefs squad
Forwards	Naitoa Ah Kuoi • Sione Ahio • Kaylum Boshier • Jahrome Brown • George Dyer • Samipeni Finau • Luke Jacobson • Benet Kumeroa • Michael Loft • Josh Lord • Brodie McAlister • Ollie Norris • Reuben O'Neill • Simon Parker • Jared Proffit • Fiti Sa • Wallace Sititi • Samisoni Taukei'aho • Tyrone Thompson • Tupou Vaa'i • Keran van Staden • Did not play • Taine Kolose • Jayden Sa • Aisake Vakasiuola
Backs	Kyle Brown • Leroy Carter • Tepaea Cook-Savage • Liam Coombes-Fabling • Lalakai Foketi • Isaac Hutchinson • Josh Jacomb • Damian McKenzie • Etene Nanai-Seturo • Emoni Narawa • Reon Paul • Cortez Ratima • Xavier Roe • Daniel Rona • Daniel Sinkinson • Te Toiroa Tahuriorangi • Kyren Taumoefolau • Quinn Tupaea
WTG	Michael Loft • Reon Paul • Daniel Sinkinson • Keran van Staden • Did not play • AJ Alatimu • Tamiro Armstrong • Cohen Brady-Leathem • Cam Church • Dylan Eti • Jai Knight • Will Martin • JJ Pokai
Coach	Jono Gibbes

Crusaders squad
Forwards	George Bell • Ethan Blackadder • George Bower • Finlay Brewis • Gus Brown • Tahlor Cahill • Seb Calder • Dominic Gardiner • Jamie Hannah • Liam Jack • Corey Kellow • Johnny Lee • Manumaua Letiu • Christian Lio-Willie • Oli Mathis • Fletcher Newell • Xavier Saifoloi • Jack Sexton • Antonio Shalfoon • Kershawl Sykes-Martin • Codie Taylor • Will Tucker • Tamaiti Williams • Did not play • Scott Barrett • Cullen Grace
Backs	Toby Bell • Louie Chapman • Mitchell Drummond • Braydon Ennor • Leicester Faingaʻanuku • Chay Fihaki • Cooper Grant • David Havili • Noah Hotham • Will Jordan • Taha Kemara • Maloni Kunawave • Kurtis MacDonald • Dallas McLeod • Johnny McNicholl • Kyle Preston • Sevu Reece • Rivez Reihana • Cooper Roberts • Macca Springer • James White • Did not play • Aki Tuivailala
WTG	Gus Brown • Mitchell Drummond • Cooper Grant • Johnny Lee • Kurtis MacDonald • Oli Mathis • Cooper Roberts • Jack Sexton • Did not play • Jae Broomfield • Sam Hainsworth-Fa'aofo • Tomasi Maka • Xavier Treacy
Coach	Rob Penney

Drua squad
Forwards	Penaia Cakobau • Elia Canakaivata • Mesake Doge • Mesu Dolokoto • Haereiti Hetet • Temo Mayanavanua • Vilive Miramira • Motikai Murray • Isoa Nasilasila • Peni Ravai • Sairusi Ravudi • Kitione Salawa • Kavaia Tagivetaua • Joseva Tamani • Samu Tawake • Zuriel Togiatama • Meli Tuni • Emosi Tuqiri • Isoa Tuwai • Mesake Vocevoce • Etonia Waqa • Did not play • Angelo Smith
Backs	Isaiah Armstrong-Ravula • Philip Baselala • Isikeli Basiyalo • Ilaisa Droasese • Issak Fines-Leleiwasa • Simione Kuruvoli • Ponepati Loganimasi • Frank Lomani • Manasa Mataele • Epeli Momo • Iosefo Namoce • Joji Nasova • Isikeli Rabitu • Taniela Rakuro • Tuidraki Samusamuvodre • Inia Tabuavou • Maika Tuitubou • Virimi Vakatawa • Kemu Valetini • Did not play • Aisea Nawai
Dev	Sairusi Ravudi • Did not play • Moses Armstrong-Ravula • Bogi Kikau • Breyton Legge • Pita Manamanaivalu • Maleli Nauvasi • Kalioni Ratunabuabua • Harold Rounds • JD Sivivatu Kanth • Joshua Uluibau • Janeiro Wakeham • Joweli Walevu
Coach	Glen Jackson

Force squad
Forwards	Nick Champion de Crespigny • Jack Daly • Nic Dolly • Vaiolini Ekuasi • Misinale Epenisa • Sef Fa'agase • Lopeti Faifua • Will Harris • Harry Johnson-Holmes • Kane Koteka • Franco Molina • Leonel Oviedo • Brandon Paenga-Amosa • Marley Pearce • Tom Robertson • Darcy Swain • Carlo Tizzano • Jeremy Williams • Did not play • Albert Alcock • Feao Fotuaika • Titi Nofoagatotoa • Joshua Smith • Tiaan Tauakipulu
Backs	Taj Annan • Kurtley Beale • George Bridge • Max Burey • Ben Donaldson • Boston Fakafanua • Mac Grealy • Nathan Hastie • Bayley Kuenzle • Darby Lancaster • Zac Lomax • Agustín Moyano • Divad Palu • Dylan Pietsch • Henry Robertson • Hamish Stewart • Did not play • Alex Harford • Ronan Leahy • Henry Palmer • Doug Philipson
Coach	Simon Cron

Highlanders squad
Forwards	Josh Bartlett • Henry Bell • Nikora Broughton • Lucas Casey • Tai Cribb • Ethan de Groot • Mitchell Dunshea • Oliver Haig • TK Howden • Sefo Kautai • Veveni Lasaqa • Tomás Lavanini • Daniel Lienert-Brown • Saula Ma'u • Hugh Renton • Will Stodart • Angus Taʻavao • Jack Taylor • Soane Vikena • Rohan Wingham • Sean Withy • Did not play • Fabian Holland
Backs	Folau Fakatava • Meihana Grindlay • Finn Hurley • Andrew Knewstubb • Adam Lennox • Jonah Lowe • Cam Millar • Jona Nareki • Reesjan Pasitoa • Jacob Ratumaitavuki-Kneepkens • Taine Robinson • Nic Shearer • Stanley Solomon • Caleb Tangitau • Timoci Tavatavanawai • Tanielu Teleʻa • Xavier Tito-Harris • Did not play • Dylan Pledger • Jake Te Hiwi • Josh Whaanga
WTG	Lucas Casey • Meihana Grindlay • Nic Shearer • Rohan Wingham • Did not play • Tayne Harvey • Senita Lauaki • A-One Lolofie • Ben Lopas • Josh Tengblad
Coach	Jamie Joseph

Hurricanes squad
Forwards	Tom Allen • Asafo Aumua • Vernon Bason • Warner Dearns • Caleb Delany • Jacob Devery • Cooper Flanders • Devan Flanders • Brayden Iose • Du'Plessis Kirifi • Peter Lakai • Siale Lauaki • Tyrel Lomax • Tevita Mafileo • Xavier Numia • Matolu Petaia • Hugo Plummer • Arese Poliko • Pouri Rakete-Stones • Brad Shields • Pasilio Tosi • Raymond Tuputupu • Isaia Walker-Leawere
Backs	Jordie Barrett • Brett Cameron • Lucas Cashmore • Ere Enari • Taniela Filimone • Fehi Fineanganofo • Josh Gray • Callum Harkin • Riley Higgins • Ruben Love • Josh Moorby • Kini Naholo • Billy Proctor • Ngane Punivai • Cam Roigard • Jone Rova • Bailyn Sullivan • Josh Timu • Jordi Viljoen • Did not play • Harry Godfrey
WTG	Taniela Filimone • Cooper Flanders • Josh Gray • Matolu Petaia • Did not play • Mosese Bason • Will Cole • Anaru Paenga-Morgan • Taine Roiri • Tony Tafa • Jai Tamati • Logan Wallace • Drew Wild
Coach	Clark Laidlaw

Moana Pasifika squad
Forwards	Tupou Afungia • Alefosio Aho • Chris Apoua • Allan Craig • Miracle Faiʻilagi • Lolani Faleiva • Malakai Hala-Ngatai • Mamoru Harada • Niko Jones • Paula Latu • Atu Moli • Sam Moli • Semisi Paea • Abraham Pole • Veikoso Poloniati • Dominic Ropeti • Feleti Sae-Taʻufoʻou • Mills Sanerivi • Tom Savage • Ofa Tauatevalu • Ola Tauelangi • Konrad Toleafoa • Tito Tuipulotu • Sam Tuitupou • Jimmy Tupou • Semisi Tupou Ta'eiloa • Did not play • Monu Moli
Backs	Solomon Alaimalo • Jackson Garden-Bachop • William Havili • Lalomilo Lalomilo • Joel Lam • Tevita Latu • Ngani Laumape • Israel Leota • Melani Matavao • Siaosi Nginingini • Tevita Ofa • Patrick Pellegrini • Faletoi Peni • Tyler Pulini • Augustine Pulu • Denzel Samoa • Julian Savea • Jonathan Taumateine • Simon-Peter Toleafoa • Tuna Tuitama • Glen Vaihu
Coach	Tana Umaga

Reds squad
Forwards	Richie Asiata • George Blake • Nick Bloomfield • Joe Brial • Charlie Brosnan • John Bryant • Josh Canham • Massimo de Lutiis • Matt Faessler • Vaiuta Latu • Fraser McReight • Hamish Muller • Josh Nasser • Zane Nonggorr • Aidan Ross • Lukhan Salakaia-Loto • Jeffery Toomaga-Allen • Seru Uru • Harry Wilson • Did not play • Zac Hough • Trevor King • Tom Robinson • Will Ross • Harrison Usher • Kingsley Uys
Backs	Lachie Anderson • Jock Campbell • Filipo Daugunu • Josh Flook • Carter Gordon • Isaac Henry • Tom Lynagh • Finn Mackay • James Martens • Tate McDermott • Harry McLaughlin-Phillips • Hunter Paisami • Treyvon Pritchard • Xavier Rubens • Tim Ryan • Kalani Thomas • Ben Volavola • Louis Werchon • Did not play • Nicholas Conway • Frankie Goldsbrough • Will McCulloch • Heremaia Murray • Dre Pakeho
Coach	Les Kiss

Waratahs squad
Forwards	Jamie Adamson • Miles Amatosero • Siosifa Amone • Jack Barrett • Angus Blyth • Daniel Botha • Ethan Dobbins • Folau Fainga'a • Oniti Finau • Charlie Gamble • Ben Grant • Clem Halaholo • Isaac Aedo Kailea • Tom Lambert • Ioane Moananu • Matt Philip • Apolosi Ranawai • Pete Samu • Angus Scott-Young • Leafi Talataina • Did not play • Eamon Doyle • Austin Durbridge • Will Goddard • Lachlan Hooper
Backs	Jack Bowen • Lawson Creighton • Jack Debreczeni • Jake Gordon • Sid Harvey • Jimmy Hendren • Max Jorgensen • Andrew Kellaway • Michael McDonald • George Poolman • Harry Potter • Triston Reilly • Joseph-Aukuso Sua'ali'i • Joey Walton • Teddy Wilson • Did not play • Leo Jacques • Archie Saunders
Coach	Dan McKellar

== Referees ==
The following referees were selected to officiate the 2026 Super Rugby Pacific season:

2026 Super Rugby Pacific referees
Australia	Nic Berry • Angus Gardner • Reuben Keane • Damon Murphy • Jordan Way
New Zealand	James Doleman • Angus Mabey • Ben O'Keeffe • Todd Petrie • Marcus Playle • Paul Williams

== See also ==
- 2026 Super Rugby Aupiki season
- 2026 Super Rugby Women's season
