= Pita Manamanaivalu =

Fijian rugby union player

- Born: 20 June 2005 (age 21) Natewa, Vanua Levu, Fiji
- Height: 184 cm (6 ft 0 in)
- School: Whanganui Collegiate School

Rugby union career
- Position: Fly-half / Centre / Wing / Fullback
- Current team: Drua, Manawatu
Senior career
Years	Team	Apps	(Points)
2025–	Manawatu	1	(0)
2026–	Drua		
- Correct as of 6 January 2026

Pita Manamanaivalu (born 20 June 2005) is a Fijian rugby union player, who plays for the Drua and Manawatu. His preferred position is Fly-half, centre, wing or fullback.

== Early career ==
Manamanaivalu is from Natewa, Vanua Levu in Fiji. He moved to Australia as a child and originally represented the Melbourne Harlequins rugby side at age grade levels. He moved to New Zealand to finish his schooling, attending Whanganui Collegiate School where he continued to play rugby, while playing club rugby for Feilding Yellows. His performances earned him selection for the Manawatu academy in 2025, and the Hurricanes U20 side in 2024. He was named in the national Fiji U20 squad in 2025.

== Professional career ==
Manamanaivalu was called into the Manawatu squad ahead of Round 5 of the 2025 Bunnings NPC, debuting against Canterbury. In January 2026, he was named in the Drua development squad ahead of the 2026 Super Rugby Pacific season.
