= Denzel Samoa =

New Zealand rugby union player

- Born: 14 December 2003 (age 22) Auckland, New Zealand
- Height: 185 cm (6 ft 1 in)
- Weight: 91 kg (201 lb; 14 st 5 lb)
- School: Forest Lake State High School

Rugby union career
- Position: Wing
Senior career
Years	Team	Apps	(Points)
2026	Moana Pasifika	1	(0)
- Correct as of 14 February 2026

Denzel Samoa (born 14 December 2003) is a New Zealand rugby union player, who played for Moana Pasifika in Super Rugby. His preferred position is wing.

== Early career ==
Samoa was born in Auckland, New Zealand, but was schooled in Australia at Forest Lake State High School. He originally played rugby league, representing Souths Logan Magpies in both 2022 and 2024. He switched to rugby union in 2025, representing Wests in Queensland's Hospital Cup competition.

== Professional career ==
Samoa represented Moana Pasifika in the trial games ahead of the 2026 Super Rugby Pacific season, having won a wider training squad contract in December 2025. He was then named in the squad for Round 1 of the season against the Drua, coming on as a replacement to debut for the side.
