= Leo Gordon (disambiguation) =

Leo Gordon (1922–2000) was an American actor.

Leo Gordon may also refer to:

- Leo Gordon (rugby union) (born 2003), New Zealand rugby player
- Leo M. Gordon (born 1952), American judge
