= Harold Rounds =

Fijian rugby union player

- Born: Galoa, Serua Province, Fiji

Rugby union career
- Position: Prop
- Current team: Drua, Bay of Plenty
Senior career
Years	Team	Apps	(Points)
2025–	Bay of Plenty	1	(0)
2026–	Drua		
- Correct as of 6 January 2026

Harold Rounds is a Fijian rugby union player, who plays for the Drua and Bay of Plenty. His preferred position is prop.

== Early career ==
Rounds is from Galoa, Serua Province in Fiji. He moved to New Zealand for later schooling, and joined the Bay of Plenty academy, winning U18 player of the year in 2023. His performances earned him selection for the Chiefs U20 squad in 2025, and the national Fiji U20 squad in 2024.

== Professional career ==
Rounds was called into the Bay of Plenty squad ahead of Round 2 of the 2025 Bunnings NPC, debuting against Counties Manukau. In January 2026, he was named in the Drua development squad ahead of the 2026 Super Rugby Pacific season.
