= Will Martin (rugby union) =

New Zealand rugby union player

- Full name: William Martin
- Born: 9 December 2004 (age 21) New Zealand
- Height: 189 cm (6 ft 2 in)
- Weight: 115 kg (254 lb; 18 st 2 lb)
- School: Hamilton Boys' High School

Rugby union career
- Position: Prop
- Current team: Chiefs, Waikato
Senior career
Years	Team	Apps	(Points)
2025–	Waikato	3	(0)
2026–	Chiefs		
- Correct as of 11 November 2025
International career
Years	Team	Apps	(Points)
2023–2024	New Zealand U20	9	(0)
- Correct as of 11 November 2025

Will Martin (born 9 December 2004) is a New Zealand rugby union player, who plays for the Chiefs and Waikato. His preferred position is prop.

== Early career ==
Martin attended Hamilton Boys' High School where he played rugby for the first XV, earning selection for the New Zealand Schools Barbarians U18 side in 2023, and later being named in the New Zealand U19 development squad. After leaving school he joined up with the Chiefs academy, representing their U20 side in 2024. He was named in the New Zealand U20 side in both 2023 and 2024.

== Professional career ==
Martin has represented Waikato in the National Provincial Championship since 2025, being named in the squad for the 2025 Bunnings NPC. He was named in the Chiefs wider training group for the 2026 Super Rugby Pacific season.
