= Iosefo Namoce =

Fijian rugby union player

- Full name: Iosefo Tui Namoce
- Born: Macuata Province, Fiji
- School: Queen Victoria School

Rugby union career
- Position: Centre
- Current team: Drua
Senior career
Years	Team	Apps	(Points)
2026–	Drua	1	(0)
- Correct as of 14 March 2026

Iosefo Namoce is a Fijian rugby union player, who plays for the Drua. His preferred position is centre.

== Early career ==
Namoce is from Macuata Province. He attended Queen Victoria School on the island. A standout in Skipper Cup rugby for Suva, he earned selection for the Gungahlin Eagles in Australian club rugby.

== Professional career ==
Namoce was named in the Drua squad for the 2026 Super Rugby Pacific season. He earned his first selection for the side in Round 5 against the Brumbies, being named on the bench, and making his debut in the match.
