= Sairusi Ravudi =

Fijian rugby union player

- Born: 2005 (age 20–21) Rewa Province, Fiji
- Height: 182 cm (6 ft 0 in)
- Weight: 105 kg (231 lb; 16 st 7 lb)
- School: Rotorua Boys' High School

Rugby union career
- Position: Hooker
- Current team: Drua
Senior career
Years	Team	Apps	(Points)
2026–	Drua	1	(5)
- Correct as of 14 March 2026

Sairusi Ravudi (born 2005) is a Fijian rugby union player, who plays for the Drua. His preferred position is hooker.

== Early career ==
Ravudi was born in Rewa Province. He moved to New Zealand with his family and attended Rotorua Boys' High School, where he earned selection for the New Zealand Fijian Schools side. He was a Fiji U20 call-up, but never made an appearance for the side.

== Professional career ==
Ravudi was named in the Drua development squad ahead of the 2026 Super Rugby Pacific season. He was called into the full squad ahead of Round 5 of the season, originally named on the bench for the match against the Brumbies. Following an illness to the starting hooker, he was called into start, scoring a try on his debut.
