= Ruben Love =

New Zealand rugby union player

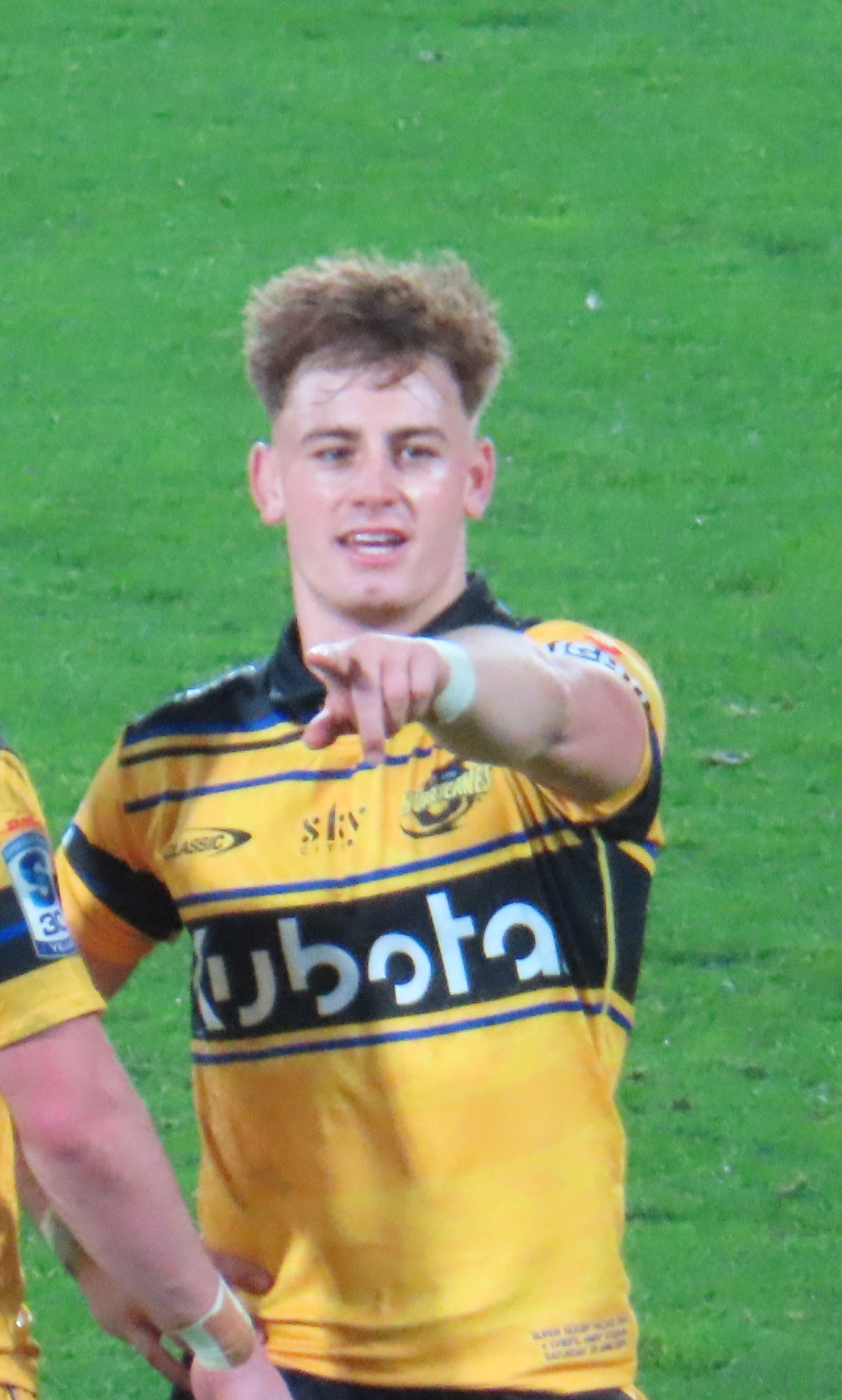
- Love playing for the Hurricanes in the 2026 Super Rugby Pacific final
- Full name: Ruben Tamati Love
- Born: 28 April 2001 (age 25) Wellington, New Zealand
- Height: 1.83 m (6 ft 0 in)
- Weight: 90 kg (198 lb; 14 st 2 lb)
- School: Palmerston North Boys' High School

Rugby union career
- Position(s): Fullback, First five-eighth
- Current team: Wellington, Hurricanes
Senior career
Years	Team	Apps	(Points)
2020–	Wellington	44	(141)
2021–	Hurricanes	55	(259)
- Correct as of 23 June 2026
International career
Years	Team	Apps	(Points)
2021	New Zealand U20	3	(0)
2022	Māori All Blacks	2	(5)
2022–2024	All Blacks XV	4	(5)
2024–	New Zealand	11	(62)
- Correct as of 14 September 2026

Ruben Tamati Love (born 28 April 2001) is a New Zealand rugby union player who plays as a first five-eighth or fullback for the Hurricanes in Super Rugby, Wellington in the National Provincial Championship and the All Blacks in international rugby. He is the son of former Māori All Black Matene Love.

== Club career ==
Love made his debut for Wellington on 25 September 2020 in a game against Bay of Plenty, scoring a try in the 32–10 victory.

In 2026, Love formed part of the Hurricanes squad which won the 2026 Super Rugby Pacific season. On 20 June, the Hurricanes defeated the Chiefs 60–5 in the final. Love was named man of the match after scoring two tries, six conversions, and one penalty kick, making up a total of 25 points, breaking the record for the most points scored by an individual in a Super Rugby Final.

== International career ==
Love made his debut for the All Blacks on 26 October 2024, coming off the bench, in a 64–19 win over Japan in Yokohama. In this game he scored two tries. He previously represented the All Blacks XV (New Zealand's second national rugby union team), the Māori All Blacks and the New Zealand U20 team.
