= Penaia Cakobau =

Fijian rugby union player

- Born: 28 December 1993 (age 32) Rotuma, Fiji
- Height: 180 cm (5 ft 11 in)
- Weight: 110 kg (243 lb; 17 st 5 lb)
- School: Queen Victoria School

Rugby union career
- Position: Hooker
- Current team: Drua, North Harbour
Senior career
Years	Team	Apps	(Points)
2025–	North Harbour	9	(5)
2026–	Drua		
- Correct as of 11 February 2026
International career
Years	Team	Apps	(Points)
2013	Fiji U20	4	(0)
- Correct as of 11 February 2026

Penaia Cakobau (born 28 December 1993) is a Fijian rugby union player, who plays for the Drua and North Harbour. His preferred position is hooker.

== Early career ==
Cakobau is from Rotuma in Fiji, but grew up in Suva. He attended Queen Victoria School where he played rugby, before playing his Skipper Cup rugby for Suva. In 2013, he represented the Fiji U20 side.

== Professional career ==
Cakobau has represented North Harbour in the National Provincial Championship since 2025, being named in the squad for the 2025 Bunnings NPC. In February 2026, he was named in the Drua squad for Round 1 of the 2026 Super Rugby Pacific season.

In 2024, he was called into the Fiji squad for the 2024 end-of-year rugby union internationals.
