= Maika Tuitubou =

Fijian rugby union player

- Born: 2 June 2003 (age 23) Lakeba, Fiji
- Height: 180 cm (5 ft 11 in)
- Weight: 95 kg (209 lb; 14 st 13 lb)
- School: Swami Vivekananda College

Rugby union career
- Position: Centre
- Current team: Drua
Senior career
Years	Team	Apps	(Points)
2026–	Drua	1	(0)
- Correct as of 26 April 2026
International career
Years	Team	Apps	(Points)
2023	Fiji U20	2	(0)
- Correct as of 26 April 2026

Maika Tuitubou (born 2 June 2003) is a Fijian rugby union player, who plays for the Drua. His preferred position is centre.

== Early career ==
Tuitubou is from Lakeba but grew up in Nadi. He attended Swami Vivekananda College where he played rugby. He came through the rugby system in Nadi, representing the side in the Skipper Cup, while also representing Norths in Australia. In 2023, he represented the Fiji U20 national side.

== Professional career ==
Tuitubou was named in the Drua squad for the 2026 Super Rugby Pacific season. He earned his first selection for the side in Round 11 against the Chiefs, being named to start, as the Drua lost to the Chiefs.
