= Kyle Brown (rugby union, born 2002) =

New Zealand rugby union player

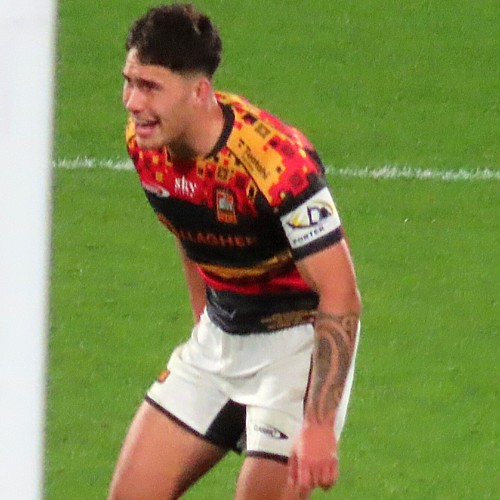
- Brown playing for the Chiefs in the 2026 Super Rugby Pacific final.
- Born: 3 August 2002 (age 24) New Zealand
- Height: 181 cm (5 ft 11 in)
- Weight: 96 kg (212 lb; 15 st 2 lb)
- School: Feilding High School

Rugby union career
- Position(s): Midfielder, Wing
- Current team: Chiefs, Manawatu
Senior career
Years	Team	Apps	(Points)
2023–	Manawatu	22	(35)
2025	Utah Warriors	9	(5)
2026–	Chiefs	11	(10)
- Correct as of 20 June 2026

Kyle Brown (born 3 August 2002) is a New Zealand rugby union player, who plays for the Chiefs and Manawatu. His preferred position is midfield.

== Early career ==
Brown attended Feilding High School where he played for their first XV. After leaving school, he joined up with the Hurricanes academy, representing the NZ Barbarians in 2020 and their U20s side in 2021. He plays his club rugby for Feilding.

== Professional career ==
Brown has represented Manawatu in the National Provincial Championship since 2023, being named in the squad for the 2025 Bunnings NPC. In 2025, he moved abroad to represent the Utah Warriors for the 2025 Major League Rugby season. He was named in the Chiefs squad for the 2026 Super Rugby Pacific season.
