= Tevita Alatini =

Australian rugby union player

- Born: 15 April 2004 (age 22) Australia
- Height: 189 cm (6 ft 2 in)
- Weight: 125 kg (276 lb; 19 st 10 lb)
- School: Patrician Brothers' College, Blacktown

Rugby union career
- Position: Prop
- Current team: Brumbies
Senior career
| Years | Team | Apps | (Points) |
| 2025– | Brumbies | 7 | (0) |
- Correct as of 5 June 2026
International career
| Years | Team | Apps | (Points) |
| 2024 | Australia U20 | 4 | (0) |
- Correct as of 14 February 2026

Tevita Alatini (born 15 April 2004) is an Australian rugby union player, who plays for the Brumbies in the Super Rugby. His preferred position is prop.

== Early career ==
Australian-born and hailing from Greater Western Sydney, Alatini attended Patrician Brothers' College, Blacktown where he played rugby league alongside rugby union. He played his junior rugby for Penrith, before representing the Gungahlin Eagles after joining up with the Brumbies academy. In 2024, he represented the Australia U20 side, although was injured in his fourth appearance and spent the next year out with injury.

== Professional career ==
Alatini was first named in the Brumbies squad for the 2025 Super Rugby Pacific season, but did not make an appearance due to injury. He returned during the 2025 Super Rugby AUS competition, before re-signing with the Brumbies. After being named in the squad for the 2026 Super Rugby Pacific season, he debuted in Round 1 against the Force.
