= Isikeli Basiyalo =

Fijian rugby union player

- Born: 13 June 2004 (age 22) Fiji
- Height: 179 cm (5 ft 10 in)
- School: Cuvu College

Rugby union career
- Position: Wing / Fullback
- Current team: Drua
Senior career
Years	Team	Apps	(Points)
2026–	Drua		
- Correct as of 8 November 2025
International career
Years	Team	Apps	(Points)
2023–2024	Fiji U20	8	(31)
- Correct as of 8 November 2025
National sevens team
Years	Team		Comps
2025	Fiji		3
- Correct as of 8 November 2025

Isikeli Basiyalo (born 13 June 2004) is a Fijian rugby union player, who plays for the Drua. His preferred position is wing or fullback.

== Early career ==
Basiyalo attended Cuvu College where he played rugby. He plays his Skipper Cup rugby for Nadroga. In 2023 and 2024 he represented Fiji U20.

== Professional career ==
Basiaylo has been a member of the Drua development side in 2025, before being promoted to the full squad for the 2026 Super Rugby Pacific season. While a member of the Drua development squad, he made his debut for the Fiji Sevens side at the 2025 Hong Kong Sevens, before making a further two tournament appearances.
