= Kurtis MacDonald =

New Zealand rugby union player

- Born: 9 August 2004 (age 22) New Zealand
- Height: 193 cm (6 ft 4 in)
- Weight: 108 kg (238 lb)
- School: Christchurch Boys' High School
- University: UC

Rugby union career
- Position: Wing
- Current team: Crusaders, Canterbury
Senior career
Years	Team	Apps	(Points)
2024–	Canterbury	5	(15)
2026–	Crusaders	2	(5)
- Correct as of 1 May 2025

Kurtis Macdonald (born 9 August 2004) is a New Zealand rugby union player, who plays for the Crusaders and Canterbury. His preferred position is wing.

== Early career ==
MacDonald attended Christchurch Boys' High School where he played for the first XV, earning selection for the Junior Crusaders in 2022. Following this, he was named in the Crusaders U20 side in both 2023 and 2024. He plays his club rugby for Sydenham.

== Professional career ==
MacDonald has represented Canterbury in the National Provincial Championship since 2024, being named in the squad for the 2025 Bunnings NPC. He was named in the Crusaders wider training group for the 2026 Super Rugby Pacific season.
