= Jack Sexton (rugby union) =

New Zealand rugby union player

- Born: 17 May 2001 (age 25) Christchurch, New Zealand
- Height: 189 cm (6 ft 2 in)
- Weight: 110 kg (243 lb; 17 st 5 lb)
- School: St Andrew's College, Christchurch
- Notable relative: Matt Sexton (father)

Rugby union career
- Position: Prop
- Current team: Crusaders, Southland
Senior career
Years	Team	Apps	(Points)
2023–	Southland	17	(0)
2026–	Crusaders		
- Correct as of 16 November 2025

Jack Sexton (born 17 May 2001) is a New Zealand rugby union player, who plays for the Crusaders and Southland. His preferred position is prop.

== Early career ==
Sexton was born in Christchurch and attended St Andrew's College, Christchurch where he played rugby for the first XV. He earned selection for the New Zealand Schools side in 2019, before being named in the New Zealand U20 squad in 2021. Having not made the Canterbury side, he moved south to the Southland region, playing his club rugby for Star RFC. He is the son of former Crusader Matt Sexton.

== Professional career ==
Sexton has represented Southland in the National Provincial Championship since 2023, being named in the squad for the 2025 Bunnings NPC. He was named in the Crusaders wider training group for the 2026 Super Rugby Pacific season.
