= Isoa Tuwai =

Fijian rugby union player

- Born: 4 June 2002 (age 24) Fiji

Rugby union career
- Position: Flanker
- Current team: Drua
Senior career
Years	Team	Apps	(Points)
2025–	Drua	1	(0)
- Correct as of 16 February 2025

Isoa Tuwai (born 4 June 2002) is a Fijian rugby union player, who plays for the Drua. His preferred position is flanker.

== Early career ==
Tuwai is from Natutu, Ba Province and plays his club rugby for Suva in the Skipper Cup. He attends the University of the South Pacific.

== Professional career ==
Tuwai was originally named in the Drua development squad ahead of the 2024 Super Rugby Pacific season. He was called into the full Drua squad ahead of Round 1 of the 2025 Super Rugby Pacific season, making his debut against the Brumbies.
