= Chris Mickelson =

Australian rugby union player

- Born: 7 March 2003 (age 23) Canberra, Australia
- Height: 184 cm (6 ft 0 in)
- Weight: 109 kg (240 lb; 17 st 2 lb)
- School: UC Senior Secondary College Lake Ginninderra

Rugby union career
- Position: Hooker / Flanker
- Current team: Brumbies
Senior career
Years	Team	Apps	(Points)
2024	San Diego Legion	8	(0)
2026–	Brumbies	1	(5)
- Correct as of 10 May 2026

Chris Mickelson (born 7 March 2003) is an Australian rugby union player, who plays for the Brumbies in the Super Rugby. His preferred position is hooker.

== Early career ==
Mickelson was born in Canberra and grew up in the area. He originally attended Brindabella Christian College before moving to UC Senior Secondary College Lake Ginninderra where he completed his schooling and earned selection for the ACT team for the 2019 Australian Schools tournament. He has been playing rugby since the age of four, when he joined Uni-Norths Owls' junior sides, the team he has represented at club level since. Outside of rugby, he is a qualified electrician.

== Professional career ==
Mickelson's first professional experience was in America, when he joined the San Diego Legion for the 2024 Major League Rugby season, making eight appearances across the season. After returning to club level, he won the Macdougall Medal, and was named in the Brumbies side for the 2025 Super Rugby AUS competition. Following this, he was named in the Brumbies squad for the 2026 Super Rugby Pacific season as a development player. He made his debut for the side in Round 13, coming on as a replacement against the Force, scoring a try.
