= Cooper Grant =

NZ rugby union player (born 2004)

- Born: 2 January 2004 (age 22) New Zealand
- Height: 183 cm (6 ft 0 in)
- Weight: 83 kg (183 lb; 13 st 1 lb)
- School: Nelson College

Rugby union career
- Position(s): First five-eighth, Centre
- Current team: Crusaders, Tasman
Senior career
Years	Team	Apps	(Points)
2024–	Tasman	17	(26)
2026–	Crusaders	2	(2)
- Correct as of 9 October 2026
International career
Years	Team	Apps	(Points)
2024	New Zealand U20	5	(5)
- Correct as of 9 October 2026

Cooper Grant (born 2 January 2004) is a New Zealand rugby union player, who plays for the Crusaders and Tasman. His position is first five-eighth.

== Early career ==
Grant attended Nelson College where he played rugby for the first XV. While at school, he also played baseball and originally signed a scholarship to play baseball in Arizona, before returning to focus on rugby. Having left school, he joined up with the Crusaders academy, representing their U20 side in 2023. In 2024, he represented the New Zealand U20 side.

== Professional career ==
Grant has represented Tasman in the National Provincial Championship since 2024, being named as a replacement player in the squad for the 2025 Bunnings NPC. He was named in the Crusaders wider training group for the 2026 Super Rugby Pacific season.
