= Leo Gordon (rugby union) =

New Zealand rugby union player

- Born: 22 April 2003 (age 23) New Zealand
- Height: 185 cm (6 ft 1 in)
- Weight: 101 kg (223 lb; 15 st 13 lb)
- School: Palmerston North Boys' High School

Rugby union career
- Position: Midfielder
- Current team: Blues, Auckland
Senior career
Years	Team	Apps	(Points)
2023–	Auckland	6	(0)
2024–2025	Kurita Water Gush	15	(30)
2026–	Blues		
- Correct as of 11 November 2025
International career
Years	Team	Apps	(Points)
2023	New Zealand U20	4	(0)
- Correct as of 11 November 2025

Leo Gordon (born 22 April 2003) is a New Zealand rugby union player, who plays for the Blues and Auckland. His preferred position is midfield.

== Early career ==
Gordon attended Palmerston North Boys' High School where he played rugby for the first XV, earning selection for the New Zealand Schools Barbarians side in 2021. Having moved to the Auckland region to join the Blues academy, he was named in their U20 squad in 2023. The same year he was named in the New Zealand U20 squad.

== Professional career ==
Gordon has represented Auckland in the National Provincial Championship since 2023, being named in the squad for the 2025 Bunnings NPC. In late 2024, he joined the Kurita Water Gush for the 2024–25 Japan Rugby League One – Division Three season. He was named in the Blues wider training group for the 2026 Super Rugby Pacific season.
