= Frank Lomani =

Fijian rugby union player (born 1996)

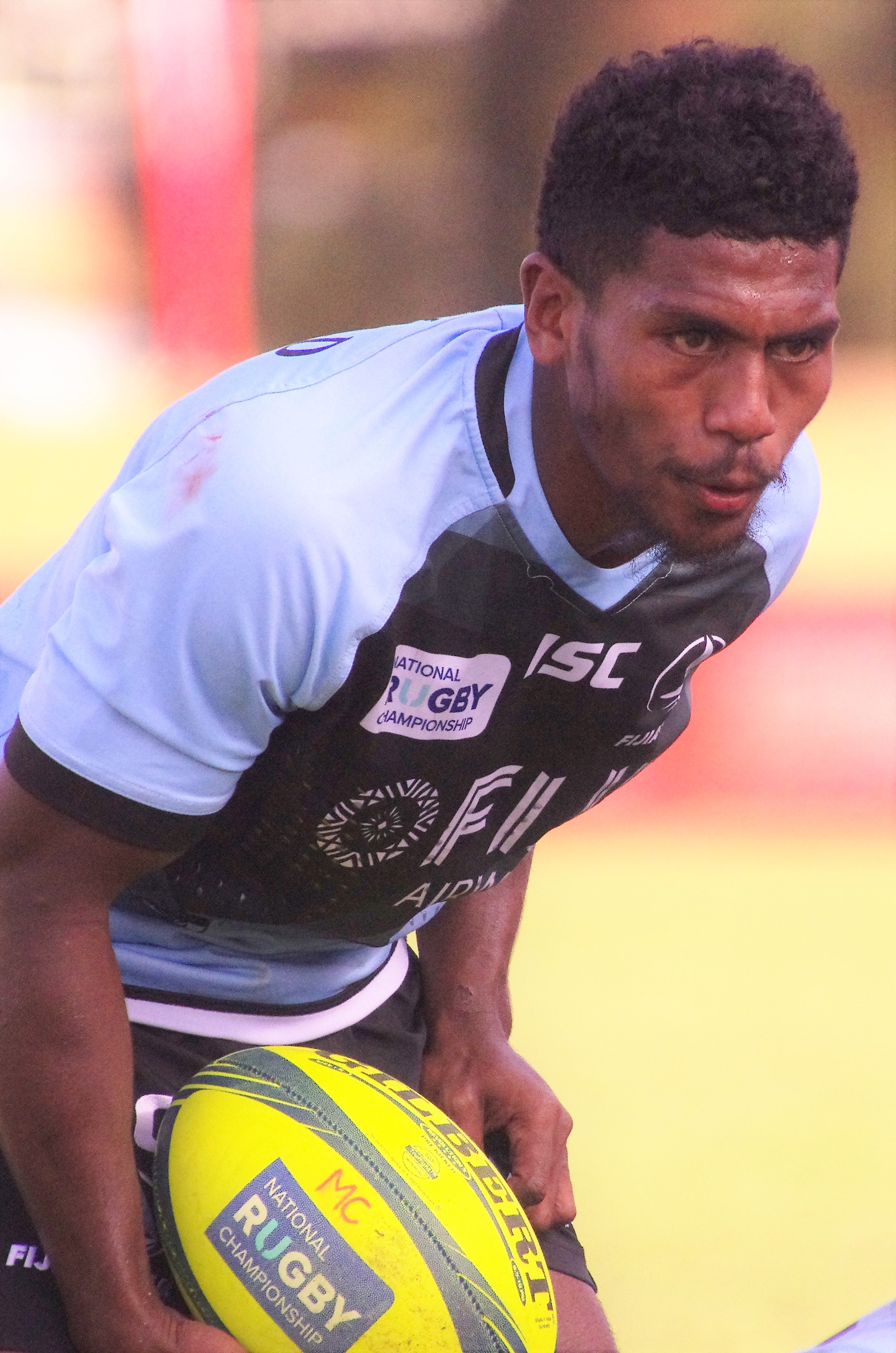
- Lomani representing Fijian Drua in the National Rugby Championship, September 2018
- Born: 18 April 1996 (age 30) Nukubalavu, Savusavu, Cakaudrove Province, Fiji
- Height: 179 cm (5 ft 10 in)
- Weight: 86 kg (190 lb; 13 st 8 lb)
- School: St. Bede's College

Rugby union career
- Position: Scrum-half
- Current team: Fijian Drua
Senior career
| Years | Team | Apps | (Points) |
| 2017 | Fijian Drua | 15 | (45) |
| 2019 | Fijian Latui | 3 | (5) |
| 2020–2021 | Melbourne Rebels | 25 | (19) |
| 2021 | Northampton Saints | 5 | (0) |
| 2022– | Fijian Drua | 42 | (88) |
- Correct as of 16 May 2026
International career
| Years | Team | Apps | (Points) |
| 2016 | Fiji U20 | 3 | (2) |
| 2017–2019 | Fiji Warriors | 7 | (17) |
| 2017– | Fiji | 48 | (87) |
| 2018 | Barbarian F.C. | 1 | (0) |
- Correct as of 14 November 2026

Frank Lomani (born 18 April 1996) is a Fijian rugby union player who plays for the Fijian Drua in Super Rugby Pacific. He debuted with the Drua in the National Rugby Championship competition and played for the Fijian Latui in the Global Rapid Rugby competition. He also trained with the Super Rugby side Melbourne Rebels during the 2018 season. His position of choice is scrum-half. He signed a two-year contract with the Melbourne Rebels for the 2020–2021 seasons. In August 2021, it was announced that Lomani would be moving to the Northern Hemisphere to play for the Northampton Saints in the English Premiership. In 2022, he returned to Fiji to play for the Drua in their inaugural season in Super Rugby Pacific.

== Super Rugby statistics ==
As of 12 June 2021

| Season | Team | Games | Starts | Sub | Mins | Tries | Cons | Pens | Drops | Points | Yel | Red |
|---|---|---|---|---|---|---|---|---|---|---|---|---|
| 2018 | Rebels | 0 | 0 | 0 | 0 | 0 | 0 | 0 | 0 | 0 | 0 | 0 |
| 2020 | Rebels | 5 | 2 | 3 | 192 | 1 | 2 | 0 | 0 | 9 | 0 | 0 |
| 2020 AU | Rebels | 8 | 4 | 4 | 421 | 0 | 0 | 0 | 0 | 0 | 0 | 0 |
| 2021 AU | Rebels | 7 | 4 | 3 | 368 | 1 | 0 | 0 | 0 | 5 | 0 | 0 |
| 2021 TT | Rebels | 5 | 2 | 3 | 208 | 1 | 0 | 0 | 0 | 5 | 0 | 0 |
| Total | | 25 | 12 | 13 | 1189 | 3 | 2 | 0 | 0 | 19 | 0 | 0 |
