= Vaiuta Latu =

Australian rugby union player

- Born: 2 June 2005 (age 21) Australia
- Height: 180 cm (5 ft 11 in)
- Weight: 116 kg (256 lb; 18 st 4 lb)
- School: St Peters Lutheran College

Rugby union career
- Position: Flanker / Number 8
- Current team: Reds
Senior career
Years	Team	Apps	(Points)
2026–	Reds	14	(5)
- Correct as of 6 June 2026

Vaiuta Latu (born 2 June 2005) is an Australian rugby union player, who plays for the Reds in the Super Rugby. His preferred position is flanker or number 8.

== Early career ==
Australian-born, Latu attended St Peters Lutheran College where he played rugby. A member of the Queensland academy, he plays his club rugby for Brothers.

== Professional career ==
Latu was first named in the Reds squad for the 2025 Super Rugby AUS competition, where his performances in the competitions were recognised. He then made his Queensland debut against Saitama Wild Knights in October 2025. He was then named in the Reds squad for the 2026 Super Rugby Pacific season, before signing a new contract in January 2026. He made his debut for the Reds in Round 1 of the season against the Waratahs.
