= Mesake Vocevoce =

Fijian rugby union player (born 2003)

- Born: 16 May 2003 (age 23) Fiji
- Height: 197 cm (6 ft 6 in)
- Weight: 106 kg (234 lb; 16 st 10 lb)

Rugby union career
- Position: Lock
- Current team: Drua
Senior career
Years	Team	Apps	(Points)
2024–	Drua	27	(5)
- Correct as of 31 May 2025
International career
Years	Team	Apps	(Points)
2023	Fiji U20	5	(5)
2024–	Fiji	10	(0)
2025	First Nations & Pasifika XV	1	(0)
- Correct as of 22 July 2025

Mesake Vocevoce (born 16 May 2003) is a Fijian rugby union player, who plays for the Drua. His preferred position is lock.

== Early career ==
Vocevoce is from Nadi. He originally played football whilst attending Nadi Sangam College, before switching to rugby in secondary school. He represented Fiji at the U20 World Cup in 2023.

== Professional career ==
Vocevoce was discovered by Drua selectors whilst playing for Nadi U19 in the Skipper Cup in 2023 and named in the development squad for the Drua ahead of the 2024 Super Rugby Pacific season. He was called into the main squad ahead of Round 1, making his debut in the same match.
