= Temo Mayanavanua =

Fijian rugby union player (born 1997)

- Full name: Temo Sukayawa Mayanavanua
- Born: 9 November 1997 (age 29) Fiji
- Height: 197 cm (6 ft 6 in)
- Weight: 120 kg (265 lb; 18 st 13 lb)
- School: Suva Grammar School

Rugby union career
- Position: Lock
- Current team: Fijian Drua
Senior career
Years	Team	Apps	(Points)
2018–2020	Northland	19	(20)
2020–2023	Lyon	55	(10)
2023–2025	Northampton Saints	36	(5)
2026-	Fijian Drua	0	(0)
- Correct as of 1 November 2021
International career
Years	Team	Apps	(Points)
2017	Fiji U20	4	(5)
2018	Fiji Warriors	6	(0)
2020–	Fiji	23	(0)
- Correct as of 1 November 2021

Temo Mayanavanua (born 9 November 1997 in Bau (Fiji)) is a Fijian rugby union player who plays for Fijian Drua in the Super Rugby Pacific. His playing position is lock.

== Early life ==
Mayanavanua grew up in Fiji where he attended Suva Grammar School. He is a cousin of Osea Kolinisau, who captained Fiji to the rugby Sevens first Olympic gold medal in 2016.

== Rugby playing career ==
Mayanavanua captained Fiji U-20.

After playing for Northland in New Zealand for 3 years, and for Lyon in France, he signed for Northampton Saints in 2023.

He made his debut for Fiji in 2020 against Georgia.
