= Todd Petrie =

New Zealand rugby union referee

- Born: Todd Petrie Auckland, New Zealand

Rugby union career
Refereeing career
Years	Competition	Apps
2024–pres.	National Provincial Championship	
2025–pres.	Super Rugby	
- Correct as of 24 May 2025

Todd Petrie is a New Zealand professional rugby union referee.

== Refereeing career ==
Petrie has been refereeing professional rugby since 2024, when he first refereed in the National Provincial Championship competition. He has previously refereed the Farah Palmer Cup and Heartland Championship competitions before promotion to select group. In 2025 he was promoted again to the performance squad, and refereed in the U20 Rugby Championship. Having previously been an assistant referee in Super Rugby, he made his refereeing debut in Round 15 of the 2025 Super Rugby Pacific season, refereeing the fixture between the Crusaders and Highlanders.
