= Jeneiro Wakeham =

Fijian rugby player (born 2003)

- Born: 24 March 2003 (age 23)
- Height: 2.08 m (6 ft 10 in)
- Weight: 140 kg (309 lb)
- School: Suva Grammar School

Rugby union career
- Position: Lock
Senior career
Years	Team	Apps	(Points)
2021–2024	Stade Français		
2024	→ Stade Niçois (loan)		
2024	Ealing Trailfinders		
International career
Years	Team	Apps	(Points)
2018	Fiji U16		
2022	Fiji U20		

Jeneiro Wakeham (born 24 March 2003) is a Fijian professional rugby union footballer who plays as a lock.

== Early life ==
He is from Suva, Fiji. He attended Suva Grammar School and played for Fiji at under-16 level in 2018.

== Career ==
=== Rugby union ===
He was part of the Fiji Rugby Union's Elite Player Pathway program. He was the youngest player for the Fijian squad in 2020, and was also part of the Suva Under-20 team. He joined Top 14 club Stade Français in France in March 2021 on a four-year contract. He played in the Oceania Rugby U20 Championship at the Gold Coast in Australia for Fiji U20 in 2022.

He played on loan at Pro D2 club Stade Niçois during the 2023–24 season. In July 2024, he signed for London-based RFU Championship side Ealing Trailfinders.

=== NFL ===
In December 2024, it was announced that he would be entering the National Football League (NFL) by joining the International Player Pathway (IPP) program for the 2025 NFL season. He became the first Fijian to participate in the IPP.

== Personal life ==
He is 6 foot and 9 inches tall and weighs 320 pounds with 36-inch arms. He speaks Fijian and English.
