= Fijian Drua =

Fijian professional rugby union team

- Union: Fiji Rugby Union
- Founded: 2017; 9 years ago
- Ground(s): Churchill Park; Four R Stadium; HFC Bank Stadium
- Coach: Brad Mooar
- Captain: TBA
- Most caps: Tevita Ikanivere (50); Isoa Nasilasila (50)
- Top scorer: Isaiah Armstrong-Ravula (181)
- Most tries: Iosefo Masi (17)
- League: Super Rugby Pacific
- 2026: 10th overall Playoffs: DNQ
| 1st kit | 2nd kit |

Official website
- drua.rugby

The Fijian Drua Nadi (currently known as the Swire Shipping Fijian Drua for sponsorship reasons) is a professional rugby union team based in Nadi, Fiji that competes in the Super Rugby. The team was created by the Fiji Rugby Union and launched in August 2017, shortly before the 2017 National Rugby Championship. The team previously competed in the Australian National Rugby Championship competition between 2017 and 2019, when the tournament was disbanded.

On 14 April 2021, New Zealand Rugby Union confirmed the side had been granted a licence to join the Super Rugby competition.

== History ==
=== National Rugby Championship ===
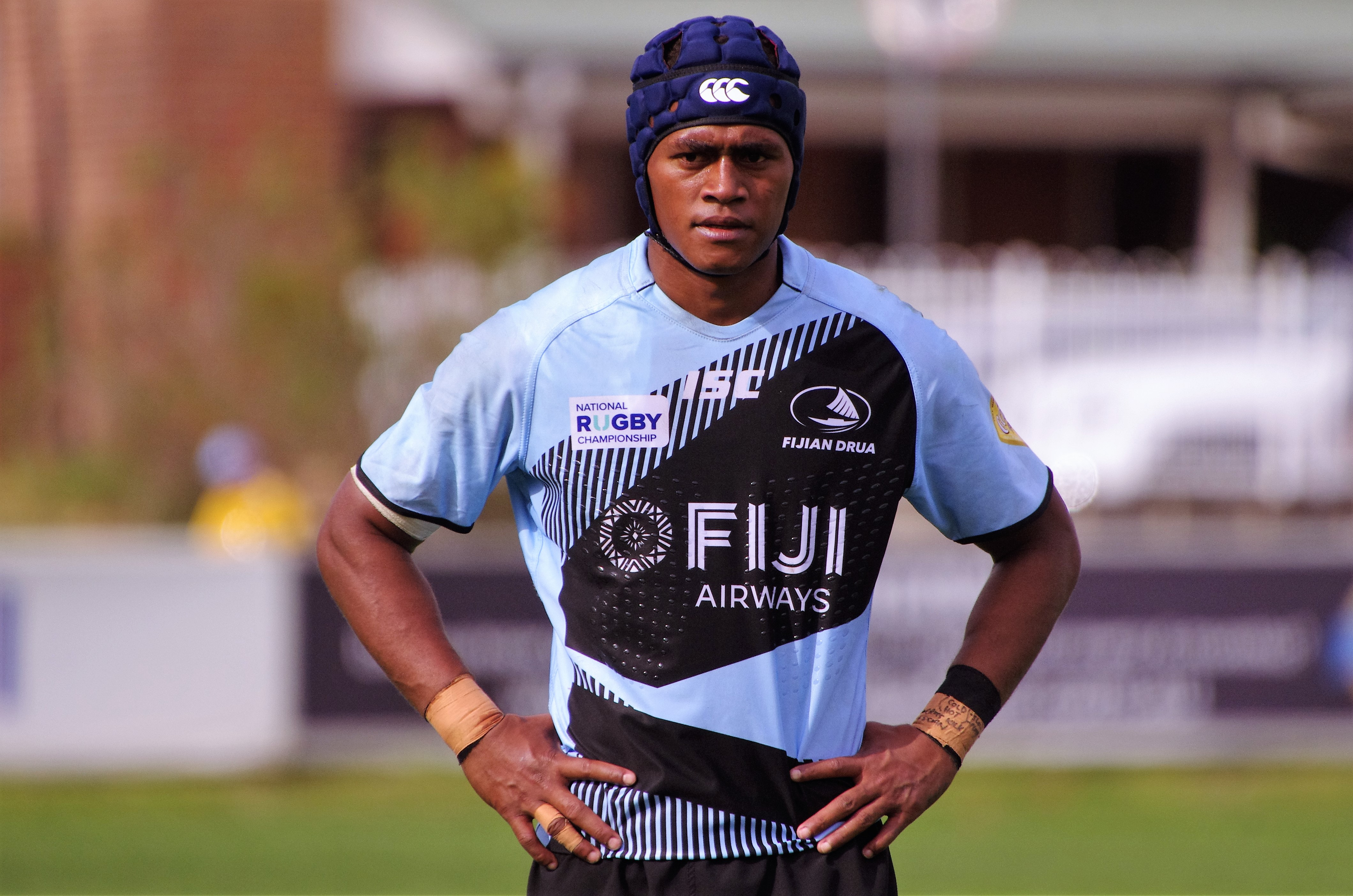
Drua flyhalf Alivereti Veitokani in NRC 2017

In July 2017, the Fiji Rugby Union announced that they would enter a team in the Australian domestic National Rugby Championship from the 2017 season onwards following successful negotiations with the Australian Rugby Union, with home matches being played in Suva as well as regional cities Lautoka and Sigatoka. On 25 July, Senirusi Seruvakula was named as the head coach of the team for their inaugural season, and a few days later the first players were invited to a training camp.

The team's name, logo and kit was revealed on 16 August 2017, with the FRU announcing that the team would be known as the Fijian Drua.

In their first year of competition in NRC 2017, the Drua won three of their first four matches to be well placed at the midpoint of the season, but then lost three of their remaining four matches to finish in third place. The team was well beaten by the eventual Champions Queensland Country in their semifinal.

The Drua finished on top of the table after the regular season in the following year, losing only one match away to Queensland Country. In the last round they won the Horan-Little Shield by defeating Perth Spirit away in Perth, before beating Canberra Vikings in their semifinal at home in Lautoka. In the final, played at the same venue a week later, the Drua avenged their previous losses to Queensland Country with a 36–26 win to take the 2018 National Rugby Championship title.

The 2019 season saw the Drua once again make the playoffs, finishing with three wins, two draws and two defeats. However, they were unable to defend their title, losing in the semi-finals to Canberra Vikings. This would be their last match in the tournament as the tournament was disbanded following a change in TV deal at the end of 2020, with the 2020 edition having been cancelled due to the COVID-19 pandemic.

=== Super Rugby Pacific ===
Following the conclusion of the 2020 Super Rugby season, the licences for the South African Super Rugby sides; the Bulls, the Lions, the Sharks and the Stormers, the Argentine Jaguares and the Japanese Sunwolves all expired. The 2021 Super Rugby season, still affected by the COVID-19 pandemic, was played in two regionalised tournaments featuring the five New Zealand Super Rugby sides and the four Australian Super Rugby sides, plus the Western Force who had returned to the tournament having lost their licence at the end of the 2017 Super Rugby season. However, from 2022 onwards a new 12-team tournament had been mooted, and on 13 November 2020, the New Zealand Rugby Union announced the Fijian Drua, along with the Moana Pasifika as its preferred partners to join the competition. Further steps were made in March 2021, when the New Zealand Rugby Union agreed to a sharing of broadcast revenue with both the Drua and Moana Pasifika, and this was followed later in the same month by World Rugby announcing financial, high performance and administrative support for both potential new sides, in order to boost the performances of Pacific Islands at international level, while also being able to stay local instead of heading overseas.

On 14 April 2021, both sides were granted licences to join Super Rugby in 2022 by the New Zealand Rugby Union.

On 30 August 2021, the side was confirmed in Super Rugby for the 2022 and 2023 seasons, beginning with the 2022 Super Rugby Pacific season. The team will be based in Suva, however for the 2022 season, the team will be based in Australia due to travel restrictions as a consequence of the COVID-19 pandemic, with the Lake Ainsworth Sports and Recreation Centre in Lennox Head, New South Wales confirmed as the team's base for the 2022 season in November 2021.

The team will be coached by Mick Byrne for 2022 and 2023.

On 15 November 2021, the schedule for the 2022 Super Rugby Pacific season was announced, with the Drua's inaugural match against the Blues in Auckland.

On 21 January 2022, Nemani Nagusa was named captain for the 2022 season.

== Name and colours ==
The team is named after the drua, a traditional Fijian double canoe that served as warships in naval battles. The team's logo originally pictured a drua stylised inside a rugby ball, to symbolise Fijian players' speed, agility and flair. It was replaced when the team joined Super Rugby, with the new logo picturing a drua. The Fijian Drua colours while participating in the National Rugby Championship were sky blue, black and white.

The Drua franchise has invigorated the small island nation which has a huge fanbase both in Fiji and abroad. Home games for the Drua often convey their battle cry 'Toso Drua Toso'. The team has also led to the resurgence of the national Flying Fijians team to the top level, as it has a squad of local based players playing in an elite professional competition, such as Vinaya Habosi, Selestino Ravutaumada, Iosefo Masi, and Isoa Nasilasila.

== Sponsorship ==
When the team competed in the National Rugby Championship, Fiji Airways were the principal sponsor for the Drua, signing a five-year deal in late 2017, and ISC were their kit manufacturer. The team was also sponsored by Paradise Beverages, with the Fiji Gold Beer logo and the Ratu Rum brand appearing on the sleeves and back of the jersey.

On 27 October 2021, New Balance were announced as the official apparel partner for the team in Super Rugby on a three-year deal. On 11 November 2021, Rooster Chicken were announced as one of the team's jersey sponsors on a three-year deal, while on 16 November 2021, PacificAus (a sports programme set up by the Australian government) were announced as sponsors of the team on a three-year deal. On 17 November 2021, during the team's kit reveal for the 2022 season, Swire Shipping were announced as the team's naming rights sponsor for 2022, while Fiji Airways will return to sponsor the side as a jersey sponsor.

== Stadiums ==
While participating in the National Rugby Championship between 2017 and 2019, the Drua played their fixtures at ANZ Stadium, Suva (2017 and 2019), Churchill Park (2017, 2018 and 2019), Lawaqa Park (2017 and 2019) and Ratu Cakobau Park (2018) in Fiji.

For Super Rugby, the Drua will play at least one fixture in Fiji during the 2022 Super Rugby Pacific season, playing at ANZ Stadium, Suva in Round 7. A further match in Fiji could take place in 2022, with the rest of the Drua's home matches taking place in Australia, with the CommBank Stadium in Parramatta, Leichhardt Oval in Sydney and Suncorp Stadium in Brisbane being confirmed as hosting venues. Due to flooding in the Brisbane area of Australia, the Sunshine Coast Stadium in Kawana Waters was used for their round 3 match, while following the relaxation of COVID-19 restrictions, the Drua were able to reschedule their round 15 match so it could be played in Fiji, at Churchill Park.

== Current squad ==
The squad for the 2027 Super Rugby Pacific season is:

2027 Fijian Drua squad
| **Props**: (Fiji) **Mesake Doge**; (Fiji) **Haereiti Hetet**; (Fiji) **Peni Ravai**; (Fiji) **Inoke Ravuiwasa**; (Fiji) Harold Rounds; (Fiji) **Meli Tuni**; (Fiji) Emosi Tuqiri; **Hookers**: (Fiji) **Penaia Cakobau**; (Fiji) **Mesu Dolokoto**; (Fiji) Sairusi Ravudi; (Fiji) **Kavaia Tagivetaua**; **Locks**: (Fiji) **Meli Derenalagi**; (Fiji) **Temo Mayanavanua**; (Fiji) **Leone Nakarawa**; (Fiji) **Manueli Ratuniyarawa**; (Fiji) **Mesake Vocevoce** | **Loose forwards**: (Fiji) **Vilive Miramira**; (Fiji) **Motikai Murray**; (Australia) **Isi Naisarani**; (Fiji) Josefa Namosimalua; (Fiji) **Kitione Salawa**; (Fiji) **Isoa Tuwai**; **Scrum-halves**: (Fiji) **Philip Baselala**; (Australia) **Issak Fines-Leleiwasa**; (Fiji) **Frank Lomani**; **Fly-halves**: (Fiji) **Isaiah Armstrong-Ravula**; (Fiji) **Kemu Valetini**; (Fiji) **Ben Volavola** | **Centres**: (Fiji) Iosefo Namoce; (Fiji) **Tuidraki Samusamuvodre**; (Fiji) Maika Tuitubou; (Fiji) **Virimi Vakatawa**; **Outside backs**: (Fiji) Isikeli Basiyalo; (Fiji) **Nacani Boginisoko**; (Fiji) **Manasa Mataele**; (Fiji) **Epeli Momo**; (Fiji) **Joji Nasova**; (Fiji) **Isikeli Rabitu**; (Fiji) **Taniela Rakuro** |
**Bold** denotes internationally capped players. * denotes players qualified to play for Fiji on residency or dual nationality. Source:

=== Development squad ===
The following players were named in the Drua development squad for the 2027 Super Rugby Pacific season:

- (Fiji) Marika Koroi (Prop)
- (Fiji) Breyton Legge (Prop)
- (Fiji) Moses Armstrong-Ravula (Hooker)
- (Fiji) Joshua Uluibau (Hooker)
- (Fiji) Jeneiro Wakeham (Lock)
- (Fiji) Luke Tuvalu (Loose forward/Centre)
- (Fiji) Viliame Tuwai (Loose forward)
- (Fiji) Sakiusa Vosayaco (Loose forward)
- (Fiji) **Sam Wye** (Scrum-half)
- (Fiji) Joeli Baleilevuka (Fly-half)
- (Fiji) Tevita Ledua (Fly-half/Fullback)
- (Fiji) **Kavekini Boselawa** (Centre)
- (Fiji) Maleli Nauvasi (Centre)

== Records ==
=== Honours ===
- National Rugby Championship
  - Champions: 2018
  - Playoff appearances: 2017, 2019
- Horan-Little Shield
  - Season winners: 2018

=== Season standings ===
National Rugby Championship

| Year | Pos | Pld | W | D | L | F | A | +/- | BP | Pts | Play-offs |
|---|---|---|---|---|---|---|---|---|---|---|---|
| 2017 | 3rd | 8 | 4 | 0 | 4 | 261 | 245 | +16 | 6 | 22 | Semi-final loss to Queensland Country by 57–21 |
| 2018 | 1st | 7 | 6 | 0 | 1 | 283 | 175 | +108 | 3 | 27 | Grand final win over Queensland Country by 36–26 |
| 2019 | 3rd | 7 | 3 | 2 | 2 | 231 | 214 | +17 | 3 | 17 | Semi-final loss to Canberra Vikings by 28–27 |

Super Rugby Pacific

| Year | Pos | Pld | W | D | L | F | A | +/- | BP | Pts | Play-offs |
|---|---|---|---|---|---|---|---|---|---|---|---|
| 2022 | 11th | 14 | 2 | 0 | 12 | 261 | 51 | −257 | 4 | 12 | - |
| 2023 | 7th | 14 | 6 | 0 | 8 | 370 | 492 | −122 | 2 | 26 | Quarterfinals loss to Crusaders by 49–8 |
| 2024 | 7th | 14 | 6 | 0 | 8 | 325 | 427 | −102 | 2 | 26 | Quarterfinals loss to Blues by 36–5 |
| 2025 | 10th | 14 | 3 | 0 | 11 | 332 | 422 | −90 | 1 | 20 | |

=== Head coaches ===
- Glen Jackson (2025–)
- Mick Byrne (2022–2024)
- Senirusi Seruvakula (2017–2019)

=== Captains ===
- Tevita Ikanivere (2025)
- Meli Derenalagi (2023–2024)
- Nemani Nagusa (2022)
- Eremasi Radrodro (2019)
- Mosese Voka (2018)
- John Stewart (2017)

== See also ==
- Fijian Latui
- Fiji Warriors
- Fijiana Drua equivalent women's team
