= List of 2024 Super Rugby Pacific matches =

This article contains a list of all matches played during the 2024 Super Rugby Pacific regular season. The draw for the 29th season of Super Rugby was announced on 16 August 2023. It was revealed days before that the "Super Round" – a round during the season that is entirely hosted by one venue, similar to the National Rugby League's Magic Round and the Australian Football League's Gather Round – would return to AAMI Park, Melbourne in 2024.

== Round 1 ==
23 February 2024
19:05 (UTC+13)

Chiefs	33–29	Crusaders
Try: Kaylum Boshier 16'; Xavier Roe 19'; Etene Nanai-Seturo 30'; Con: Damian McKenzie (2/2) 17', 20'; Shaun Stevenson (1/1) 31'; Pen: Damian McKenzie (2/2) 6', 40+2'; Josh Ioane (2/2) 75', 79'	Report	Try: Sevu Reece 23'; Chay Fihaki (2) 44', 68'; Scott Barrett 47'; Con: Rivez Reihana (2/3) 24', 45'; Taha Kemara (1/1) 68'; Pen: Rivez Reihana (1/1) 11'

FMG Stadium Waikato, Hamilton
Attendance: 16,119
Referee: Nic Berry (Australia)

23 February 2024
19:35 (UTC+11)

Rebels	3–30	Brumbies
Pen: Carter Gordon (1/2) 32'; Cards: Filipo Daugunu (yellow card) 26'	Report	Try: Corey Toole (2) 4', 17'; Charlie Cale (2) 54', 78'; Con: Noah Lolesio (2/3) 5', 18'; Declan Meredith (0/1); Pen: Noah Lolesio (2/2) 27', 47'; Cards: Len Ikitau (yellow card) 39'

AAMI Park, Melbourne
Attendance: 4,190
Referee: Angus Gardner (Australia)

23 February 2024
19:00 (UTC+8)

Force	14–44	Hurricanes
Try: Nic White 45'; Chase Tiatia 57'; Con: Ben Donaldson (2/2) 46', 58'; Cards: Harry Potter (yellow card) 3'; Marley Pearce (yellow card) 52'	Report	Try: Josh Moorby 9'; Jordi Viljoen 21'; Caleb Delany 37'; Asafo Aumua 54'; Peter Lakai 73'; Salesi Rayasi 80'; Con: Brett Cameron (4/6) 22', 38', 55', 80+2'; Pen: Brett Cameron (2/2) 18', 61'; Cards: Billy Proctor (yellow card) 40'

HBF Park, Perth
Attendance: 7,855
Referee: Damon Murphy (Australia)

24 February 2024
16:35 (UTC+13)

Blues	34–10	Drua
Try: Hoskins Sotutu (2) 11', 40+1'; Caleb Clarke 15'; Zarn Sullivan (2) 20', 63'; Dalton Papalii 33'; Con: Stephen Perofeta (2/6) 16', 40+2'; Cards: Finlay Christie (yellow card) 44'	Report	Try: Ratu Leone Rotuisolia 44'; Con: Frank Lomani (1/1) 45'; Pen: Isaiah Armstrong-Ravula (1/1) 31'; Cards: Isaiah Armstrong-Ravula (yellow card) 39'

Semenoff Stadium, Whangārei
Referee: Ben O'Keeffe (New Zealand)

24 February 2024
19:05 (UTC+13)

Highlanders	35–21	Moana Pasifika
Try: Jacob Ratumaitavuki-Kneepkens (2) 15', 47'; Saula Ma'u 27'; Timoci Tavatavanawai 60'; Sam Gilbert 72'; Con: Sam Gilbert (5/5) 17', 28', 48', 61', 73'; Cards: Fabian Holland (yellow card) 32'	Report	Try: Jacob Norris 33'; Nigel Ah Wong 40+1'; Con: William Havili (1/2) 40+2'; Pen: William Havili (3/3) 5', 12', 44'

Forsyth Barr Stadium, Dunedin
Attendance: 12,496
Referee: Brendon Pickerill (New Zealand)

24 February 2024
19:05 (UTC+10)

Reds	40–22	Waratahs
Try: Hunter Paisami 11'; Matt Faessler (2) 26', 52'; Penalty try 40'; Tate McDermott 57'; Fraser McReight 65'; Con: Tom Lynagh (2/3) 12', 27'; Harry McLaughlin-Phillips (2/2) 58', 66'	Report	Try: Jake Gordon 17'; Dylan Pietsch (2) 37', 59'; Con: Tane Edmed (2/3) 19', 61'; Pen: Tane Edmed (1/1) 8'; Cards: Max Jorgensen (yellow card) 40'

Suncorp Stadium, Brisbane
Attendance: 14,593
Referee: Paul Williams (New Zealand)

== Round 2 – Super Round ==
1 March 2024
18:00 (UTC+11)

Highlanders	29–37	Blues
Try: Sean Withy 2'; Jacob Ratumaitavuki-Kneepkens 11'; Rhys Patchell 26'; Timoci Tavatavanawai 63'; Ajay Faleafaga 80+1'; Con: Sam Gilbert (1/4) 64'; Ajay Faleafaga (1/1) 80+3'; Pen: Rhys Patchell (0/1); Cards: Jacob Ratumaitavuki-Kneepkens (yellow card) 40+1'	Report	Try: Hoskins Sotutu (3) 7', 43', 68'; Taufa Funaki 37'; Mark Tele'a 40+2'; Con: Stephen Perofeta (3/5) 38', 40+3', 44'; Pen: Stephen Perofeta (2/2) 20', 53'; Cards: Sam Nock (yellow card) 80'

AAMI Park, Melbourne
Attendance: 10,582
Referee: Angus Gardner (Australia)

1 March 2024
20:10 (UTC+11)

Rebels	48–34	Force
Try: Andrew Kellaway (2) 8', 40+7'; Carter Gordon (2) 35', 56'; Josh Kemeny 54'; Filipo Daugunu (2) 58', 73'; Con: Carter Gordon (2/4) 36', 40+8'; Jake Strachan (3/3) 57', 59', 74'; Pen: Jake Strachan (1/1) 69'; Cards: Josh Canham (yellow card) 16'	Report	Try: Chase Tiatia 10'; Tom Horton 16'; Max Burey 38'; Michael Wells 49'; Con: Ben Donaldson (4/4) 11', 17', 39', 50'; Pen: Ben Donaldson (2/2) 26', 42'

AAMI Park, Melbourne
Attendance: 10,582
Referee: Nic Berry (Australia)

2 March 2024
17:05 (UTC+11)

Moana Pasifika	39–36	Drua
Try: Sione Mafileo 12'; Lotu Inisi 40+1'; Henry Taefu 41'; Sam Moli 56'; Abraham Pole 58'; Con: William Havili (4/5) 40+2', 43', 57', 60'; Pen: William Havili (1/1) 24'; Christian Leali'ifano 65'; Cards: Nigel Ah Wong (red card) 55'; Sekope Kepu (yellow card) 68'	Report	Try: Elia Canakaivata (2) 16', 61'; Selestino Ravutaumada 48'; Epeli Momo 72'; Junior Ratuva 75'; Con: Isaiah Armstrong-Ravula (4/5) 49', 62', 73', 75'; Pen: Isaiah Armstrong-Ravula (1/1) 35'; Cards: Selestino Ravutaumada (yellow card) 38'

AAMI Park, Melbourne
Attendance: 11,231
Referee: Angus Mabey (New Zealand)

2 March 2024
19:35 (UTC+11)

Crusaders	24–37	Waratahs
Try: Macca Springer 2'; Sevu Reece (2) 19', 48'; Christian Lio-Willie 73'; Con: Taha Kemara (1/3) 49'; David Havili (1/1) 74'; Cards: Dominic Gardiner (yellow card) 36'; Chay Fihaki (yellow card) 55'	Report	Try: Hugh Sinclair 21'; Harry Wilson 40+1'; Triston Reilly 55'; Jake Gordon 66'; Con: Tane Edmed (4/4) 22', 40+2', 57', 67'; Pen: Tane Edmed (3/3) 6', 12', 30', Cards: Harry Johnson-Holmes (yellow card) 17'

AAMI Park, Melbourne
Attendance: 11,231
Referee: Brendon Pickerill (New Zealand)

3 March 2024
14:00 (UTC+11)

Chiefs	46–12	Brumbies
Try: Xavier Roe 9'; Etene Nanai-Seturo 17'; Damian McKenzie 29'; Josh Ioane 62'; Cortez Ratima (2) 67', 73'; Con: Damian McKenzie (5/6) 10', 29', 63', 68', 74'; Pen: Damian McKenzie (2/2) 5', 26'; Cards: Jared Proffit (red card) 77'	Report	Try: Corey Toole (2) 11', 59'; Con: Noah Lolesio (1/2) 13'

AAMI Park, Melbourne
Attendance: 10,339
Referee: James Doleman (New Zealand)

3 March 2024
16:30 (UTC+11)

Hurricanes	38–33 (a.e.t.)	Reds
Try: Ruben Love (2) 5', 51'; Kini Naholo 24'; Cam Roigard (2) 40+1', 66'; Pasilio Tosi 80+7'; Con: Brett Cameron (4/5) 26', 40+2', 52', 67'; Cards: Jordie Barrett (red card) 57'	Report	Try: Harry Wilson 11'; Zane Nonggorr 33'; Tate McDermott 37'; Josh Flook 46'; Matt Faessler 59'; Con: Tom Lynagh (4/5) 12', 38', 47', 60'

AAMI Park, Melbourne
Attendance: 10,339
Referee: Jordan Way (Australia)

== Round 3 ==
8 March 2024
19:05 (UTC+13)

Moana Pasifika	23–29	Rebels
Try: Allan Craig 36'; Julian Savea 49'; Con: William Havili (2/2) 37', 50'; Pen: William Havili (3/3) 18', 61', 80+1'; Cards: Allan Craig (yellow card) 64'; Jacob Norris (yellow card) 75'	Report	Try: Andrew Kellaway 5'; Ryan Louwrens 10'; Vaiolini Ekuasi 30'; Lachie Anderson 67'; Glen Vaihu 76'; Con: Carter Gordon (2/4) 11', 31'; James Tuttle (0/1)

FMG Stadium Waikato, Hamilton (Note: The round 3 match between Moana Pasifika and the Rebels on 8 March 2024 was originally scheduled to be played at North Harbour Stadium, Albany, but the game had to be moved to another venue due to turf issues.)
Referee: Brendon Pickerill (New Zealand)

8 March 2024
19:35 (UTC+11)

Waratahs	21–23	Highlanders
Try: Izaia Perese 29'; Max Jorgensen 68'; Con: Tane Edmed (1/2) 30'; Pen: Tane Edmed (3/5) 13', 25', 40+2'	Report	Try: Rhys Patchell 5'; Tanielu Teleʻa 65'; Con: Sam Gilbert (2/2) 6', 67'; Pen: Sam Gilbert (3/4) 2', 32', 58'; Rhys Patchell (0/1)

Allianz Stadium, Sydney
Attendance: 13,533
Referee: Damon Murphy (Australia)

9 March 2024
13:05 (UTC+12)

Drua	20–10	Crusaders
Try: Selestino Ravutaumada 34'; Frank Lomani 45'; Con: Isaiah Armstrong-Ravula (2/2) 35', 47'; Pen: Isaiah Armstrong-Ravula (2/2) 24', 77'	Report	Try: Sevu Reece 19'; Con: Taha Kemara (1/1) 20'; Pen: Taha Kemara (1/2) 14'

Churchill Park, Lautoka
Referee: Nic Berry (Australia)

9 March 2024
14:35 (UTC+11)

Brumbies	22–19	Force
Try: Ryan Lonergan 30'; Rob Valetini 46'; Billy Pollard 54'; Con: Noah Lolesio (2/3) 47', 55'; Pen: Noah Lolesio (1/1) 35'	Report	Try: Hamish Stewart 9'; Michael Wells 20'; Harry Potter 75'; Con: Ben Donaldson (2/3) 10', 22'; Cards: Harry Potter (yellow card) 41'

GIO Stadium, Canberra
Referee: Dan Waenga (New Zealand)

9 March 2024
19:05 (UTC+13)

Hurricanes	29–21	Blues
Try: Josh Moorby (2) 13', 26'; Kini Naholo 42'; Riley Higgins 68'; Con: Brett Cameron (3/4) 15', 27', 44'; Pen: Brett Cameron (1/1) 37'	Report	Try: Mark Tele'a 34'; Kurt Eklund 47'; Ricky Riccitelli 72'; Con: Stephen Perofeta (3/3) 35', 48', 72'; Pen: Stephen Perofeta (0/1)

Sky Stadium, Wellington
Attendance: 11,180
Referee: Jordan Way (Australia)

9 March 2024
18:35 (UTC+10)

Reds	25–19	Chiefs
Try: Matt Faessler 17'; Fraser McReight 23'; Josh Flook 57'; Con: Tom Lynagh (1/2) 24'; Harry McLaughlin-Phillips (1/1) 58'; Pen: Tom Lynagh (1/1) 40+2'; Harry McLaughlin-Phillips (1/1) 54'	Report	Try: Josh Ioane 12'; Shaun Stevenson 47'; Con: Damian McKenzie (0/2); Pen: Damian McKenzie (3/3) 27', 40', 52'

Suncorp Stadium, Brisbane
Attendance: 16,725
Referee: Ben O'Keeffe (New Zealand)

== Round 4 ==
15 March 2024
19:05 (UTC+13)

Crusaders	10–14	Hurricanes
Try: Cullen Grace 54'; Con: Riley Hohepa (1/1) 55'; Pen: Riley Hohepa (1/2) 71'; Cards: Jamie Hannah (yellow card) 77'; Owen Franks (red card) 80+1'	Report	Try: Tyrel Lomax 14'; Justin Sangster 79'; Con: Brett Cameron (2/2) 15', 80'; Pen: Brett Cameron (0/2)

Apollo Projects Stadium, Christchurch
Referee: James Doleman (New Zealand)

15 March 2024
19:35 (UTC+11)

Rebels	26–53	Reds
Try: Andrew Kellaway 26'; Glen Vaihu 44'; Isaac Aedo Kailea 49'; Tuaina Taii Tualima 55'; Con: Carter Gordon (3/4) 27', 45', 56'	Report	Try: Seru Uru (2) 3', 31'; Matt Faessler 18'; Liam Wright 22'; Peni Ravai 40'; Josh Flook (2) 51', 71'; Josh Nasser 68'; Con: Harry McLaughlin-Phillips (4/6) 19', 23', 32', 40+1'; Tom Lynagh (1/2) 69'; Pen: Tom Lynagh (1/1) 80+2'

AAMI Park, Melbourne
Referee: Nic Berry (Australia)

15 March 2024
19:00 (UTC+8)

Force	14–22	Moana Pasifika
Try: Bayley Kuenzle 21'; Carlo Tizzano 61'; Con: Ben Donaldson (2/2) 22', 62'; Pen: Ben Donaldson (0/2); Cards: Carlo Tizzano (yellow card) 31'	Report	Try: Sama Malolo 17'; Sekope Kepu 35'; Kyren Taumoefolau 48'; Con: Christian Leali'ifano (2/3) 36', 50'; Pen: Christian Leali'ifano (0/1); William Havili (1/1) 72'

HBF Park, Perth
Attendance: 5,480
Referee: Graham Cooper (Australia)

16 March 2024
16:35 (UTC+13)

Highlanders	21–27	Brumbies
Try: Nikora Broughton 5'; Billy Harmon 59'; Con: Sam Gilbert (1/2) 60'; Pen: Sam Gilbert (3/4) 4', 32', 80+1'	Report	Try: Tom Wright 24'; Corey Toole 43'; Lachlan Lonergan 76'; Con: Noah Lolesio (3/3) 25', 44', 78'; Pen: Noah Lolesio (2/2) 49', 65'

Forsyth Barr Stadium, Dunedin
Attendance: 13,024
Referee: Ben O'Keeffe (New Zealand)

16 March 2024
19:30 (UTC+13)

Chiefs	46–29	Drua
Try: Kaylum Boshier (2) 11', 60'; Cortez Ratima 16'; Daniel Rona 32'; Etene Nanai-Seturo 43'; Shaun Stevenson 72'; Con: Damian McKenzie (5/6) 12', 17', 34', 44', 62'; Pen: Damian McKenzie (2/2) 28', 67'; Cards: Ollie Norris (yellow card) 80+1'	Report	Try: Iosefo Masi (2) 7', 22'; Te Ahiwaru Cirikidaveta 70'; Kemu Valetini 80+1'; Con: Isaiah Armstrong-Ravula (3/4) 8', 23', 71'; Pen: Isaiah Armstrong-Ravula (1/1) 37'

FMG Stadium Waikato, Hamilton
Attendance: 13,660
Referee: Dan Waenga (New Zealand)

16 March 2024
19:35 (UTC+11)

Waratahs	10–12	Blues
Try: Jay Fonokalafi 79'; Con: Tane Edmed (1/1) 80'; Pen: Tane Edmed (1/1) 23'	Report	Try: Ofa Tuʻungafasi 36'; Zarn Sullivan 58'; Con: Stephen Perofeta (1/2) 37'; Pen: Stephen Perofeta (0/3)

Allianz Stadium, Sydney
Attendance: 13,237
Referee: Jordan Way (Australia)

== Round 5 – Kids Round ==
22 March 2024
19:05 (UTC+13)

Hurricanes	54–28	Rebels
Try: Salesi Rayasi (2) 13', 20'; Jordie Barrett (2) 17', 70'; Brad Shields 24'; Harry Godfrey 32'; Du'Plessis Kirifi 50'; TJ Perenara 56'; Con: Aidan Morgan (7/8) 14', 18', 25', 34', 51', 57', 71'	Report	Try: Angelo Smith 39'; Lukas Ripley 46'; Mason Gordon 60'; Jordan Uelese 78'; Con: Carter Gordon (4/4) 40', 47', 61', 79'

Central Energy Trust Arena, Palmerston North
Referee: Nic Berry (Australia)

22 March 2024
19:35 (UTC+11)

Brumbies	60–21	Moana Pasifika
Try: Hudson Creighton (2) 7', 42'; Rob Valetini 21'; Tamati Tua 28'; Tom Wright (2) 38', 72'; Charlie Cale 54'; Corey Toole 70'; Lachlan Lonergan 77'; Con: Noah Lolesio (5/6) 8', 29', 39', 43', 55'; Ryan Lonergan (1/3) 78'; Pen: Noah Lolesio (1/1) 27'; Cards: Ollie Sapsford (yellow card) 66'	Report	Try: Kyren Taumoefolau 11'; Lotu Inisi 34'; Pepesana Patafilo 68'; Con: Christian Leali'ifano (2/2) 12', 35'; William Havili (1/1) 69'

GIO Stadium, Canberra
Attendance: 7,208
Referee: Jordan Way (Australia)

23 March 2024
13:05 (UTC+12)

Drua	39–36 (a.e.t.)	Waratahs
Try: Iosefo Masi (3) 14', 29', 33'; Frank Lomani 19'; Tevita Ikanivere 50'; Con: Isaiah Armstrong-Ravula (4/5) 15', 21', 30', 50'; Pen: Isaiah Armstrong-Ravula (1/3) 60'; Drop: Kemu Valetini (1/1) 80+8'; Cards: Kitione Salawa Jr. (yellow card) 60'; Ratu Peni Matawalu (yellow card) 82'	Report	Try: Mahe Vailanu (2) 4', 60'; Charlie Gamble 46'; Joey Walton 57'; Lachlan Swinton 64'; Con: Tane Edmed (4/5) 5', 47', 58', 65'; Pen: Tane Edmed (1/1) 9'; Cards: Mark Nawaqanitawase (yellow card) 40'

Churchill Park, Lautoka
Attendance: 5,545
Referee: James Doleman (New Zealand)

23 March 2024
16:35 (UTC+13)

Chiefs	28–21	Highlanders
Try: Daniel Rona 6'; Bradley Slater 14'; Rameka Poihipi 40'; Cortez Ratima 54'; Con: Damian McKenzie (4/4) 8', 15', 40', 55'; Pen: Damian McKenzie (0/1); Cards: Luke Jacobson (yellow card) 66'	Report	Try: Timoci Tavatavanawai 60'; Jacob Ratumaitavuki-Kneepkens 71'; Nikora Broughton 77'; Con: Sam Gilbert (3/3) 60', 72', 78'; Pen: Sam Gilbert (0/1); Cards: Timoci Tavatavanawai (yellow card) 12'; Tanielu Teleʻa (red card) 38'

FMG Stadium Waikato, Hamilton
Attendance: 12,319
Referee: Paul Williams (New Zealand)

23 March 2024
19:05 (UTC+13)

Blues	26–6	Crusaders
Try: Ofa Tuʻungafasi 43'; AJ Lam 45'; Con: Stephen Perofeta (2/2) 44', 47'; Pen: Stephen Perofeta (4/4) 4', 31', 40+4', 63; Cards: Dalton Papalii (yellow card) 9'	Report	Pen: Riley Hohepa (2/2) 20', 38'; Cards: Willi Heinz (yellow card) 40+3'; Sevu Reece (yellow card) 51'

Eden Park, Auckland
Attendance: 19,270
Referee: Ben O'Keeffe (New Zealand)

23 March 2024
16:35 (UTC+8)

Force	40–31	Reds
Try: Bayley Kuenzle (2) 15', 43'; Tom Franklin 23'; Chase Tiatia 31'; Nic White 40'; Carlo Tizzano 54'; Con: Ben Donaldson (5/6) 16', 24', 32', 40+2', 55'; Pen: Ben Donaldson (0/1)	Report	Try: Tate McDermott (2) 35', 42'; Matt Faessler 50'; Fraser McReight 64'; Jock Campbell 75'; Con: Tom Lynagh (2/4) 43', 51'; Harry McLaughlin-Phillips (1/1) 75'

HBF Park, Perth
Attendance: 5,462
Referee: Damon Murphy (Australia)

== Round 6 ==
29 March 2024
19:05 (UTC+13)

Crusaders	37–26	Chiefs
Try: Chay Fihaki 6'; Johnny McNicholl (2) 12', 63'; Cullen Grace 23'; George Bell 43'; Con: Riley Hohepa (2/4) 14', 25'; Rivez Reihana (1/1) 64'; Pen: Riley Hohepa (1/1) 40'; Rivez Reihana (1/1) 78'	Report	Try: Emoni Narawa 17'; George Dyer 34'; Anton Lienert-Brown 59'; Cortez Ratima 70'; Con: Josh Jacomb (1/2) 35'; Josh Ioane (2/2) 60', 71'

Apollo Projects Stadium, Christchurch
Referee: Angus Gardner (Australia)

29 March 2024
19:35 (UTC+11)

Waratahs	21–27	Rebels
Try: Lachlan Swinton 27'; Langi Gleeson 60'; Jack Grant 76'; Con: Tane Edmed (2/2) 28', 61'; Will Harrison (1/1) 76'; Cards: Hugh Sinclair (yellow card) 31'	Report	Try: Lachie Anderson 22'; Darby Lancaster 66'; Taniela Tupou 72'; Filipo Daugunu 80'; Con: Carter Gordon (2/4) 23', 73'; Pen: Carter Gordon (1/1) 33'

Allianz Stadium, Sydney
Attendance: 11,445
Referee: Angus Mabey (New Zealand)

30 March 2024
13:05 (UTC+12)

Drua	31–13	Force
Try: Epeli Momo 12'; Selestino Ravutaumada 17'; Iosefo Masi 43'; Con: Isaiah Armstrong-Ravula (2/3) 18', 44'; Pen: Isaiah Armstrong-Ravula (4/4) 25', 32', 55', 57'; Cards: Elia Canakaivata (yellow card) 21'; Tevita Ikanivere (red card) 40'	Report	Try: Tom Horton 2'; Chase Tiatia 40+1'; Con: Ben Donaldson (0/2); Pen: Ben Donaldson (1/1) 48'

Churchill Park, Lautoka
Referee: Reuben Keane (Australia)

30 March 2024
16:35 (UTC+13)

Moana Pasifika	8–47	Blues
Try: Sione Havili Talitui 38'; Con: Christian Leali'ifano (0/1); Pen: Christian Leali'ifano (1/1) 29'	Report	Try: Mark Tele'a (3) 13', 57', 74'; Stephen Perofeta 22'; Caleb Clarke 31'; Bryce Heem 35'; Finlay Christie 53'; Con: Stephen Perofeta (6/7) 15', 24', 32', 36', 54', 58'

Eden Park, Auckland
Attendance: 11,035
Referee: James Doleman (New Zealand)

30 March 2024
19:05 (UTC+13)

Highlanders	12–47	Hurricanes
Try: Folau Fakatava 45'; Jacob Ratumaitavuki-Kneepkens 76'; Con: Sam Gilbert (1/2) 46'; Cards: Jacob Ratumaitavuki-Kneepkens (yellow card) 10'	Report	Try: Xavier Numia 11'; Peter Lakai 18'; Asafo Aumua 28'; Cam Roigard 31'; Josh Moorby 41'; TJ Perenara 66'; Justin Sangster 80+1'; Con: Brett Cameron (4/5) 12', 18', 32', 43'; Jordie Barrett (2/2) 67', 80+2'

Forsyth Barr Stadium, Dunedin
Attendance: 11,556
Referee: Damon Murphy (Australia)

30 March 2024
18:35 (UTC+10)

Reds	19–20	Brumbies
Try: Josh Flook 2'; Penalty try 55'; Josh Nasser 59'; Con: Tom Lynagh (1/1) 3'; Lawson Creighton (0/1)	Report	Try: Tom Wright (2) 13', 63'; Con: Noah Lolesio (2/2) 14', 64'; Pen: Noah Lolesio (2/2) 40+1', 70'; Cards: Rhys van Nek (yellow card) 56'

Suncorp Stadium, Brisbane
Attendance: 17,782
Referee: Ben O'Keeffe (New Zealand)

== Round 7 ==
5 April 2024
19:05 (UTC+13)

Blues	50–3	Force
Try: Ofa Tuʻungafasi 13'; Ricky Riccitelli 20'; Laghlan McWhannell 30'; Taufa Funaki (2) 37', 51'; Hoskins Sotutu 43'; Corey Evans 55'; AJ Lam 76'; Con: Harry Plummer (5/8) 14', 22', 31', 39', 55'	Report	Pen: Ben Donaldson (1/1) 29'

Eden Park, Auckland
Attendance: 10,440
Referee: Paul Williams (New Zealand)

5 April 2024
19:35 (UTC+11)

Rebels	41–20	Drua
Try: Angelo Smith 29'; Jordan Uelese 40+1'; Glen Vaihu (2) 42', 53'; Maciu Nabolakasi 46'; Filipo Daugunu 69'; Con: Carter Gordon (4/6) 40+2', 43', 47', 70'; Pen: Carter Gordon (1/1) 20'	Report	Try: Frank Lomani 14'; Apisalome Vota 23'; Ratu Leone Rotuisolia 33'; Con: Isaiah Armstrong-Ravula (1/3) 34'; Pen: Isaiah Armstrong-Ravula (1/1) 10'; Cards: Ratu Leone Rotuisolia (yellow card) 39'; Frank Lomani (red card) 57'; Jone Koroiduadua (red card) 74'

AAMI Park, Melbourne
Referee: Damon Murphy (Australia)

6 April 2024
19:05 (UTC+13)

Chiefs	68–12	Moana Pasifika
Try: Simon Parker 11'; Emoni Narawa (3) 23', 63', 80+1'; Etene Nanai-Seturo 28'; Daniel Rona 32'; Te Toiroa Tahuriorangi 43'; Sione Ahio 53'; Peniasi Malimali 57'; Cortez Ratima 66'; Con: Damian McKenzie (9/10) 12', 24', 29', 33', 44', 54', 58', 64', 67'	Report	Try: Melani Matavao 50'; Miracle Faiʻilagi 78'; Con: William Havili (0/1); Otumaka Mausia (1/1) 80'

FMG Stadium Waikato, Hamilton
Attendance: 10,375
Referee: Ben O'Keeffe (New Zealand)

6 April 2024
19:35 (UTC+11)

Brumbies	40–16	Waratahs
Try: Harrison Goddard 39'; Rob Valetini 49'; Corey Toole 67'; Charlie Cale 78'; Con: Noah Lolesio (3/3) 40', 50', 69'; Jack Debreczeni (1/1) 80'; Pen: Noah Lolesio (4/4) 9', 31', 34', 57'; Drop: Noah Lolesio (0/1)	Report	Try: Charlie Gamble 64'; Con: Will Harrison (1/1) 65'; Pen: Tane Edmed (3/3) 3', 36', 46'

GIO Stadium, Canberra
Attendance: 8,018
Referee: Nic Berry (Australia)

Bye/s: Crusaders, Highlanders, Hurricanes, Reds

== Round 8 ==
12 April 2024
19:05 (UTC+12)

Moana Pasifika	17–14	Reds
Try: Julian Savea 34'; William Havili 79'; Con: William Havili (2/2) 35', 80+1'; Pen: William Havili (1/3) 15'	Report	Try: Peni Ravai 42'; Jordan Petaia 71'; Con: Harry McLaughlin-Phillips (1/1) 43'; Lawson Creighton (1/1) 72'; Cards: Tate McDermott (red card) 47'; Fraser McReight (red card) 73'

Semenoff Stadium, Whangārei
Referee: Angus Mabey (New Zealand)

12 April 2024
19:35 (UTC+10)

Waratahs	43–40 (a.e.t.)	Crusaders
Try: Lachlan Swinton 4'; Ned Hanigan 28'; Dylan Pietsch 59'; Julian Heaven 72'; Con: Tane Edmed (2/2) 5', 29'; Will Harrison (2/2) 60', 73'; Pen: Tane Edmed (3/3) 14', 19', 37'; Will Harrison (1/1) 80+2'; Drop: Will Harrison (1/1) 83'	Report	Try: Sevu Reece (2) 1', 10'; Dallas McLeod 23'; Mitchell Drummond 63'; Christian Lio-Willie 79'; Con: Riley Hohepa (2/3) 11', 24'; Rivez Reihana (1/2) 80'; Pen: Riley Hohepa (2/2) 33', 50'; Rivez Reihana (1/1) 57'; Cards: Johnny McNicholl (yellow card) 80+1'

Allianz Stadium, Sydney
Attendance: 12,894
Referee: Nic Berry (Australia)

13 April 2024
19:05 (UTC+12)

Hurricanes	36–23	Chiefs
Try: TJ Perenara (2) 17', 58'; Brayden Iose 29'; Kini Naholo 68'; Asafo Aumua 72'; Con: Brett Cameron (4/5) 18', 30', 59', 73'; Pen: Brett Cameron (1/2) 6'	Report	Try: Cortez Ratima 20'; Emoni Narawa 50'; Con: Damian McKenzie (2/2) 21', 51'; Pen: Damian McKenzie (3/3) 35', 39', 48'; Cards: Emoni Narawa (yellow card) 28'

Sky Stadium, Wellington
Attendance: 14,961
Referee: James Doleman (New Zealand)

13 April 2024
19:35 (UTC+10)

Rebels	47–31	Highlanders
Try: Ryan Louwrens 3'; Darby Lancaster (3) 21', 40+1', 79'; Penalty try 28'; Carter Gordon (2) 61', 71'; Con: Carter Gordon (5/6) 22', 40+3', 62', 72', 80'	Report	Try: Sean Withy 11'; Folau Fakatava 56'; Ricky Jackson 68'; Ethan de Groot 75'; Con: Sam Gilbert (4/4) 11', 58', 69', 76'; Pen: Sam Gilbert (1/2) 20'; Cards: Jacob Ratumaitavuki-Kneepkens (yellow card) 28'

AAMI Park, Melbourne
Referee: Paul Williams (New Zealand)

Bye/s: Blues, Brumbies, Drua, Force

== Round 9 ==
19 April 2024
19:05 (UTC+12)

Drua	15–38	Hurricanes
Try: Isikeli Rabitu 10'; Kitione Salawa Jr. 46'; Con: Kemu Valetini (1/2) 12'; Pen: Kemu Valetini (1/2) 70'	Report	Try: Billy Proctor 7'; Devan Flanders 15'; Jordie Barrett 34'; James O'Reilly 39'; Xavier Numia 80+2'; Con: Jordie Barrett (1/1) 8'; Aidan Morgan (4/4) 16', 35', 40+1', 80+3'; Pen: Jordie Barrett (1/1) 74'; Cards: Du'Plessis Kirifi (yellow card) 64'; Isaia Walker-Leawere (yellow card) 65'; Caleb Delany (yellow card) 79'

HFC Bank Stadium, Suva
Referee: Paul Williams (New Zealand)

19 April 2024
19:35 (UTC+10)

Reds	31–0	Highlanders
Try: Hunter Paisami 3'; Ryan Smith 27'; Lawson Creighton 62'; Suliasi Vunivalu 80+1'; Con: Tom Lynagh (2/2) 4', 28'; Lawson Creighton (2/2) 63', 80+2'; Pen: Tom Lynagh (1/1) 19'	Report

Suncorp Stadium, Brisbane
Attendance: 13,082
Referee: Jordan Way (Australia)

20 April 2024
19:05 (UTC+12)

Blues	46–7	Brumbies
Try: Hoskins Sotutu (2) 9', 40+2'; Caleb Clarke 33'; Dalton Papalii 45'; Taufa Funaki 52'; Ricky Riccitelli 58'; Kurt Eklund 77'; Con: Harry Plummer (4/6) 10', 34', 40+3', 54'; Lucas Cashmore (0/1); Pen: Harry Plummer (1/1) 37'; Cards: Taufa Funaki (yellow card) 6'	Report	Try: Luke Reimer 64'; Con: Noah Lolesio (1/1) 65'; Cards: James Slipper (yellow card) 49'

Eden Park, Auckland
Attendance: 6,835
Referee: Ben O'Keeffe (New Zealand)

20 April 2024
17:35 (UTC+8)

Force	37–15	Crusaders
Try: Chase Tiatia 18'; Tom Horton 40+2'; Sam Carter 73'; Carlo Tizzano 80'; Con: Ben Donaldson (1/4) 80+2'; Pen: Ben Donaldson (5/5) 9', 24', 44', 55', 64'; Cards: Carlo Tizzano (yellow card) 28'	Report	Try: Levi Aumua 4'; George Bell 51'; Sevu Reece 59'; Con: Riley Hohepa (0/2); Chay Fihaki (0/1)

HBF Park, Perth
Attendance: 7,526
Referee: Reuben Keane (Australia)

Bye/s: Chiefs, Moana Pasifika, Rebels, Waratahs

== Round 10 ==
26 April 2024
19:05 (UTC+12)

Crusaders	39–0	Rebels
Try: Christian Lio-Willie (2) 10', 44'; Cullen Grace 17'; Owen Franks 63'; Sevu Reece 72'; Johnny McNicholl 79'; Con: Rivez Reihana (3/6) 64', 73', 80'; Pen: Rivez Reihana (1/1) 50'	Report

Apollo Projects Stadium, Christchurch
Referee: Angus Mabey (New Zealand)

26 April 2024
19:35 (UTC+10)

Waratahs	22–38	Chiefs
Try: Julian Heaven 11'; Jake Gordon 19'; Lachlan Swinton 66'; Con: Tane Edmed (1/2) 12'; Will Harrison (1/1) 66'; Pen: Tane Edmed (1/1) 53'	Report	Try: Shaun Stevenson 22'; Emoni Narawa (2) 38', 48'; Cortez Ratima 54'; Wallace Sititi 61'; Kaylum Boshier 75'; Con: Damian McKenzie (4/6) 39', 55', 62', 77'; Cards: Etene Nanai-Seturo (yellow card) 9'; Tupou Vaa'i (yellow card) 19'

Allianz Stadium, Sydney
Attendance: 14,982
Referee: Jordan Way (Australia)

27 April 2024
14:05 (UTC+12)

Drua	24–17	Moana Pasifika
Try: Taniela Rakuro (2) 2', 69'; Selestino Ravutaumada 36'; Con: Isaiah Armstrong-Ravula (3/3) 3', 38', 71'; Pen: Isaiah Armstrong-Ravula (1/2) 25'; Cards: Mesake Doge (yellow card) 18'	Report	Try: Henry Taefu 48'; Sione Havili Talitui 72'; Sama Malolo 76'; Con: Christian Leali'ifano (1/3) 77'

Churchill Park, Lautoka
Referee: Graham Cooper (Australia)

27 April 2024
14:35 (UTC+10)

Brumbies	27–19	Hurricanes
Try: Noah Lolesio 5'; Tamati Tua 16'; Ollie Sapsford 19'; Con: Noah Lolesio (3/3) 6', 17', 21'; Pen: Noah Lolesio (2/3) 27', 45'	Report	Try: Xavier Numia (2) 12', 32'; Jordie Barrett 46'; Con: Brett Cameron (2/3) 33', 47'

GIO Stadium, Canberra
Attendance: 8,648
Referee: Angus Gardner (Australia)

27 April 2024
19:05 (UTC+12)

Highlanders	7–6	Force
Try: Folau Fakatava 47'; Con: Cam Millar (1/1) 48'; Pen: Cam Millar (0/1)	Report	Pen: Ben Donaldson (2/3) 38', 54'

Forsyth Barr Stadium, Dunedin
Referee: Dan Waenga (New Zealand)

27 April 2024
19:35 (UTC+10)

Reds	34–41	Blues
Try: Jeffery Toomaga-Allen 25'; Suliasi Vunivalu 47'; Tim Ryan (3) 50', 61', 64'; Con: Tom Lynagh (2/3) 26', 51'; Lawson Creighton (1/2) 66'; Pen: Lawson Creighton (1/1) 74'	Report	Try: Patrick Tuipulotu 13'; Cole Forbes 19'; Angus Taʻavao 58'; Hoskins Sotutu 69'; Kurt Eklund 75'; Sam Nock 80+2'; Con: Harry Plummer (4/6) 60', 70', 76', 80+3'; Pen: Harry Plummer (1/2) 36'; Cards: Bryce Heem (yellow card) 33'

Suncorp Stadium, Brisbane
Attendance: 16,325
Referee: James Doleman (New Zealand)

== Round 11 ==
3 May 2024
19:05 (UTC+12)

Hurricanes	41–12	Waratahs
Try: Billy Proctor 3'; Brett Cameron 14'; Josh Moorby 17'; Brayden Iose 27'; Salesi Rayasi (2) 60', 69'; TJ Perenara 80+2'; Con: Brett Cameron (3/7) 5', 16', 18'	Report	Try: Vuate Karawalevu 65'; Hugh Sinclair 75'; Con: Tane Edmed (1/2) 76'

Sky Stadium, Wellington
Attendance: 11,286
Referee: Dan Waenga (New Zealand)

3 May 2024
19:35 (UTC+10)

Rebels	11–38	Blues
Try: Ryan Louwrens 16'; Con: Carter Gordon (0/1); Pen: Carter Gordon (2/2) 8', 27'	Report	Try: Mark Tele'a (2) 10', 47'; PJ Sheck 32'; Patrick Tuipulotu 57'; Sam Darry (2) 75', 78'; Con: Harry Plummer (4/6) 11', 57', 76', 79'; Cards: Harry Plummer (yellow card) 62'

AAMI Park, Melbourne
Referee: Angus Gardner (Australia)

4 May 2024
15:05 (UTC+13)

Moana Pasifika	17–28	Highlanders
Try: Abraham Pole 5'; William Havili 26'; Con: William Havili (2/2) 6', 28'; Pen: William Havili (1/1) 20'	Report	Try: Jacob Ratumaitavuki-Kneepkens (2) 9', 36'; Connor Garden-Bachop 23'; Con: Cam Millar (2/3) 24', 37'; Pen: Cam Millar (3/3) 46', 59', 72'

Teufaiva Stadium, Nuku'alofa
Referee: Ben O'Keeffe (New Zealand)

4 May 2024
16:35 (UTC+12)

Crusaders	28–33	Reds
Try: Dallas McLeod 38'; Corey Kellow 52'; Quinten Strange 57'; Sevu Reece 74'; Con: Leigh Halfpenny (1/1) 40'; Chay Fihaki (3/3) 53', 57', 75'; Pen: Leigh Halfpenny (0/1)	Report	Try: Fraser McReight 22'; Tim Ryan (2) 25', 68'; Jeffery Toomaga-Allen 43'; Harry Wilson 61'; Con: Lawson Creighton (4/5) 23', 27', 44', 63'

Apollo Projects Stadium, Christchurch
Referee: Jordan Way (Australia)

4 May 2024
19:05 (UTC+12)

Chiefs	56–7	Force
Try: Emoni Narawa 6'; Daniel Rona (3) 13', 56', 71'; Damian McKenzie 20'; Tupou Vaa'i 30'; Bradley Slater 47'; Tyrone Thompson 69'; Josh Ioane 76'; Con: Damian McKenzie (4/5) 14', 22', 31', 48'; Emoni Narawa (0/1); Josh Ioane (0/3); Pen: Damian McKenzie (1/1) 2'; Cards: Kaylum Boshier (yellow card) 36'	Report	Try: Penalty try 36'; Cards: Hamish Stewart (yellow card) 68'

FMG Stadium Waikato, Hamilton
Attendance: 11,000
Referee: James Doleman (New Zealand)

4 May 2024
19:35 (UTC+10)

Brumbies	28–20	Drua
Try: Len Ikitau (2) 6', 37'; Allan Alaalatoa 8'; Luke Reimer 66'; Con: Noah Lolesio (4/4) 7', 9', 38', 68'; Cards: Harry Vella (yellow card) 51'	Report	Try: Isoa Nasilasila 40'; Simione Kuruvoli 51'; Con: Isaiah Armstrong-Ravula (2/2) 40+1', 53'; Pen: Isaiah Armstrong-Ravula (2/2) 35', 70'

GIO Stadium, Canberra
Referee: Nic Berry (Australia)

== Round 12 – Culture Round ==
10 May 2024
19:05 (UTC+12)

Moana Pasifika	7–43	Chiefs
Try: Anzelo Tuitavuki 71'; Con: D'Angelo Leuila (1/1) 72'; Pen: D'Angelo Leuila (0/1); Cards: Irie Papuni (yellow card) 26'; Aisea Halo (yellow card) 33'	Report	Try: Quinn Tupaea 23'; Josh Jacomb 33'; Etene Nanai-Seturo 41'; Anton Lienert-Brown 51'; Simon Parker 57'; Luke Jacobson 75'; Liam Coombes-Fabling 80'; Con: Josh Jacomb (4/7) 35', 52', 58', 75'

Go Media Stadium, Auckland
Referee: Damon Murphy (Australia)

10 May 2024
19:35 (UTC+10)

Reds	26–22	Rebels
Try: Matt Faessler 16'; Fraser McReight 55'; Jock Campbell 59'; Tim Ryan 63'; Con: Lawson Creighton (2/3) 56', 60'; James O'Connor (1/1) 64'; Cards: Hunter Paisami (yellow card) 19'	Report	Try: Andrew Kellaway 19'; Sam Talakai 28'; Maciu Nabolakasi 72'; Con: Carter Gordon (2/3) 20', 73'; Pen: Carter Gordon (1/1) 12'; Cards: Lachie Anderson (yellow card) 53'

Suncorp Stadium, Brisbane
Attendance: 10,864
Referee: Paul Williams (New Zealand)

11 May 2024
16:35 (UTC+12)

Blues	31–27	Hurricanes
Try: Bryce Heem 4'; Cole Forbes 36'; Mark Tele'a 53'; Angus Taʻavao 64'; Con: Harry Plummer (4/4) 5', 38', 54', 66'; Pen: Harry Plummer (1/1) 76'; Cards: Akira Ioane (yellow card) 30'	Report	Try: Brad Shields 8'; Josh Moorby 40+3'; Peter Lakai 46'; TJ Perenara 68'; Con: Brett Cameron (0/2); Jordie Barrett (2/2) 47', 70'; Pen: Jordie Barrett (1/1) 58'

Eden Park, Auckland
Attendance: 23,515
Referee: James Doleman (New Zealand)

11 May 2024
19:05 (UTC+12)

Highlanders	32–29	Crusaders
Try: Tanielu Teleʻa 6'; Cam Millar 22'; Con: Cam Millar (2/2) 7', 23'; Pen: Cam Millar (6/6) 4', 15', 27', 33', 74', 78'; Cards: Folau Fakatava (yellow card) 9'; Cam Millar (yellow card) 80+1'	Report	Try: Sevu Reece (2) 10', 46'; Dallas McLeod 18'; Macca Springer 80+2'; Con: Chay Fihaki (3/3) 11', 20', 80+3'; Pen: Chay Fihaki (1/1) 52'; Cards: Jamie Hannah (yellow card) 37'

Forsyth Barr Stadium, Dunedin
Attendance: 18,537
Referee: Angus Gardner (Australia)

11 May 2024
19:35 (UTC+10)

Waratahs	21–29	Brumbies
Try: Jake Gordon 15'; Joey Walton 58'; Tane Edmed 74'; Con: Will Harrison (2/2) 16', 59'; Tane Edmed (1/1) 74'	Report	Try: Charlie Cale 10'; Rob Valetini 43'; Len Ikitau 49'; Sefo Kautai 78'; Con: Ryan Lonergan (2/3) 11', 44'; Jack Debreczeni (1/1) 79'; Pen: Ryan Lonergan (1/1) 33'

Allianz Stadium, Sydney
Attendance: 12,562
Referee: Ben O'Keeffe (New Zealand)

11 May 2024
19:55 (UTC+8)

Force	48–10	Drua
Try: Chase Tiatia 1'; Carlo Tizzano 14'; Michael Wells 55'; Lopeti Faifua 68'; Bayley Kuenzle 72'; Ben Donaldson 78'; Con: Ben Donaldson (6/6) 3', 16', 57', 69', 73', 80'; Pen: Ben Donaldson (2/2) 20', 64'; Cards: Nic White (yellow card) 51'	Report	Try: Selestino Ravutaumada 45'; Con: Isaiah Armstrong-Ravula (1/1) 46'; Pen: Isaiah Armstrong-Ravula (1/1) 39'

HBF Park, Perth
Attendance: 4,882
Referee: Angus Mabey (New Zealand)

== Round 13 ==
17 May 2024
19:05 (UTC+12)

Hurricanes	32–24	Moana Pasifika
Try: Raymond Tuputupu 11'; Siale Lauaki 20'; Richard Judd 23'; Peter Lakai 54'; Con: Aidan Morgan (3/4) 21', 24', 55'; Pen: Aidan Morgan (2/2) 61', 78'	Report	Try: Sione Mafileo 26'; Abraham Pole 36'; Fine Inisi 52'; Alamanda Motuga 74'; Con: William Havili (1/3) 37'; Christian Leali'ifano (1/1) 75'; Pen: William Havili (0/1)

Sky Stadium, Wellington
Attendance: 7,293
Referee: James Doleman (New Zealand)

17 May 2024
19:35 (UTC+10)

Rebels	23–26	Chiefs
Try: Glen Vaihu 7'; Lachie Anderson (2) 57', 74'; Con: Nick Jooste (1/3) 75'; Pen: Nick Jooste (2/2) 19', 40'	Report	Try: Tupou Vaa'i 23'; Samisoni Taukei'aho 46'; Con: Damian McKenzie (2/2) 25', 47'; Pen: Damian McKenzie (4/4) 4', 40+2', 52', 79'; Cards: Tupou Vaa'i (yellow card) 29'

AAMI Park, Melbourne
Referee: Nic Berry (Australia)

18 May 2024
14:05 (UTC+12)

Drua	28–19	Reds
Try: Penalty try 5'; Tevita Ikanivere (2) 8', 46'; Con: Isaiah Armstrong-Ravula (1/2) 47'; Pen: Isaiah Armstrong-Ravula (2/3) 15', 80+2'; Kemu Valetini (1/1) 40+4'	Report	Try: Floyd Aubrey 12'; Lawson Creighton 24'; George Blake 78'; Con: Lawson Creighton (2/2) 13', 25'; James O'Connor (0/1); Cards: Suliasi Vunivalu (yellow card) 6' (yellow-red card) 47'

HFC Bank Stadium, Suva
Referee: Angus Gardner (Australia)

18 May 2024
14:35 (UTC+10)

Brumbies	31–24	Crusaders
Try: Andy Muirhead 12'; Tom Wright (2) 14', 38'; Rob Valetini 59'; Penalty try 80'; Con: Noah Lolesio (2/4) 13', 60'; Cards: Tamati Tua (yellow card) 24'	Report	Try: Johnny McNicholl 29'; Sevu Reece 45'; Noah Hotham 69'; Con: Fergus Burke (3/3) 30', 45', 69'; Pen: Chay Fihaki (1/1) 75'; Cards: Quinten Strange (yellow card) 80'

GIO Stadium, Canberra
Attendance: 8,232
Referee: Ben O'Keeffe (New Zealand)

18 May 2024
19:05 (UTC+12)

Blues	47–13	Highlanders
Try: Ofa Tuʻungafasi 4'; Cole Forbes 13'; Kurt Eklund (2) 31', 53'; Kade Banks 46'; Taufa Funaki 63'; Caleb Clarke 69'; Con: Harry Plummer (6/7) 6', 14', 32', 47', 65', 70'	Report	Try: Timoci Tavatavanawai 8'; Con: Cam Millar (1/1) 9'; Pen: Cam Millar (2/2) 17', 21'

Eden Park, Auckland
Attendance: 11,939
Referee: Paul Williams (New Zealand)

18 May 2024
17:35 (UTC+8)

Force	27–7	Waratahs
Try: Bayley Kuenzle 10'; Ben Donaldson 20'; Reed Prinsep 69'; Con: Ben Donaldson (3/3) 12', 21', 70'; Pen: Ben Donaldson (2/2) 18', 40+1'	Report	Try: Mark Nawaqanitawase 7'; Con: Will Harrison (1/1) 8'; Cards: Brad Amituanai (yellow card) 66'

HBF Park, Perth
Attendance: 5,861
Referee: Jordan Way (Australia)

== Round 14 ==
24 May 2024
19:05 (UTC+12)

Chiefs	17–20	Hurricanes
Try: Emoni Narawa 41'; Wallace Sititi 59'; Con: Damian McKenzie (2/2) 42', 60'; Pen: Damian McKenzie (1/2) 72'; Cards: Kaylum Boshier (yellow card) 25'	Report	Try: Xavier Numia 19'; Jordie Barrett 33'; Con: Brett Cameron (2/2) 20', 34'; Pen: Jordie Barrett (0/1); Brett Cameron (2/3) 53', 79'; Cards: Raymond Tuputupu (red card) 7'; Kini Naholo (yellow card) 58'

FMG Stadium Waikato, Hamilton
Attendance: 22,000
Referee: Paul Williams (New Zealand)

24 May 2024
19:35 (UTC+10)

Brumbies	53–17	Rebels
Try: Jahrome Brown 14'; Tom Wright (2) 33', 48'; Nick Frost 37'; Billy Pollard 40+1'; Rhys van Nek 73'; Luke Reimer 78'; Con: Noah Lolesio (6/7) 15', 34', 38', 40+2', 74', 79'; Pen: Noah Lolesio (2/2) 12', 24'; Cards: Jahrome Brown (yellow card) 55'; Tamati Tua (yellow card) 57'; Len Ikitau (yellow card) 66'	Report	Try: Filipo Daugunu 62'; Angelo Smith 66'; Con: Jake Strachan (2/2) 62', 67'; Pen: Nick Jooste (1/1) 7'; Cards: Darby Lancaster (yellow card) 31'

GIO Stadium, Canberra
Referee: Angus Gardner (Australia)

25 May 2024
16:35 (UTC+12)

Moana Pasifika	27–12	Waratahs
Try: Kyren Taumoefolau 16'; Fine Inisi (2) 26', 41'; Sekope Kepu 61'; Con: William Havili (2/4) 17', 28'; Pen: William Havili (1/1) 53'	Report	Try: Langi Gleeson 64'; Izaia Perese 70'; Con: Jack Bowen (1/2) 71'

Go Media Stadium, Auckland
Attendance: 1,832
Referee: Nic Berry (Australia)

25 May 2024
19:05 (UTC+12)

Crusaders	29–27	Blues
Try: Ethan Blackadder 20'; Chay Fihaki 40'; Christian Lio-Willie 53'; Noah Hotham 61'; Con: Fergus Burke (1/2) 20'; Chay Fihaki (2/2) 55', 62'; Pen: Fergus Burke (0/1); Chay Fihaki (1/2) 66'	Report	Try: Ofa Tuʻungafasi (2) 22', 35'; AJ Lam (2) 50', 72'; Con: Harry Plummer (2/4) 36', 52'; Pen: Harry Plummer (1/1) 10'; Cards: Stephen Perofeta (yellow card) 46'

Apollo Projects Stadium, Christchurch
Referee: James Doleman (New Zealand)

25 May 2024
19:35 (UTC+10)

Reds	59–13	Force
Try: Tim Ryan (3) 5', 44', 74'; Jock Campbell 17'; Seru Uru 37'; Matt Faessler 50'; Fraser McReight (2) 59', 64'; Josh Nasser 71'; Con: Tom Lynagh (3/6) 18', 39', 61'; James O'Connor (1/3) 75'; Pen: Tom Lynagh (2/2) 23', 27'	Report	Try: Bayley Kuenzle 78'; Con: Bayley Kuenzle (1/1) 79'; Pen: Ben Donaldson (2/3) 3', 21'; Cards: Reed Prinsep (yellow card) 58'; Hamish Stewart (yellow card) 73'

Suncorp Stadium, Brisbane
Attendance: 12,321
Referee: Damon Murphy (Australia)

26 May 2024
14:05 (UTC+12)

Highlanders	39–3	Drua
Try: Jona Nareki (2) 18', 50'; Jacob Ratumaitavuki-Kneepkens 29'; Timoci Tavatavanawai 58'; Nikora Broughton 77'; Con: Sam Gilbert (4/5) 20', 51', 59', 79'; Pen: Sam Gilbert (2/3) 26', 36'; Drop: Jacob Ratumaitavuki-Kneepkens (0/1)	Report	Pen: Isaiah Armstrong-Ravula (1/1) 46'; Cards: Ilaisa Droasese (yellow card) 80'

Forsyth Barr Stadium, Dunedin
Attendance: 15,036
Referee: Ben O'Keeffe (New Zealand)

== Round 15 ==
31 May 2024
19:05 (UTC+12)

Crusaders	43–10	Moana Pasifika
Try: Ethan Blackadder 18'; Codie Taylor (2) 23', 32'; Ryan Crotty 36'; Noah Hotham 46'; Dallas McLeod 55'; Macca Springer 67'; Con: Fergus Burke (4/7) 19', 24', 33', 47'; Cards: Joe Moody (yellow card) 11'	Report	Try: Fine Inisi 29'; Con: William Havili (1/1) 30'; Pen: William Havili (1/1) 13'; Cards: Fine Inisi (yellow card) 31'

Apollo Projects Stadium, Christchurch
Referee: Angus Gardner (Australia)

31 May 2024
19:35 (UTC+10)

Waratahs	26–27	Reds
Try: Jed Holloway 46'; Jay Fonokalafi 53'; Jack Bowen 63'; Dylan Pietsch 71'; Con: Jack Bowen (3/4) 54', 64', 72'; Pen: Jack Bowen (0/1)	Report	Try: Seru Uru 6'; Tate McDermott 19'; Josh Flook 21'; Hunter Paisami 50'; Con: Lawson Creighton (2/3) 8', 20'; Tom Lynagh (0/1); Pen: Tom Lynagh (1/2) 75'

Allianz Stadium, Sydney
Attendance: 12,018
Referee: James Doleman (New Zealand)

1 June 2024
14:05 (UTC+12)

Drua	40–19	Rebels
Try: Waqa Nalaga (2) 7', 47'; Ilaisa Droasese 19'; Iosefo Masi 36'; Selestino Ravutaumada 41'; Frank Lomani 52'; Con: Isaiah Armstrong-Ravula (3/4) 20', 37', 43'; Caleb Muntz (2/2) 49', 53'; Cards: Frank Lomani (yellow card) 12'	Report	Try: Penalty try 12'; Andrew Kellaway 13'; Josh Canham 27'; Con: Jake Strachan (1/2) 14'

Churchill Park, Lautoka
Referee: Paul Williams (New Zealand)

1 June 2024
16:35 (UTC+12)

Hurricanes	41–14	Highlanders
Try: Salesi Rayasi (3) 7', 23', 55'; Du'Plessis Kirifi (2) 13', 36'; TJ Perenara 18'; Brayden Iose 62'; Con: Brett Cameron (3/7) 14', 24', 56'	Report	Try: Matt Whaanga 3'; Fabian Holland 33'; Con: Sam Gilbert (2/2) 3', 34'; Cards: Connor Garden-Bachop (yellow card) 37'; Sam Gilbert (yellow card) 56'

Sky Stadium, Wellington
Attendance: 14,963
Referee: Nic Berry (Australia)

1 June 2024
19:05 (UTC+12)

Blues	31–17	Chiefs
Try: Ricky Riccitelli 9'; Hoskins Sotutu (2) 19', 54'; Mark Tele'a 43'; Akira Ioane 64'; Con: Harry Plummer (3/5) 21', 45', 55'; Cards: Hoskins Sotutu (yellow card) 36'	Report	Try: Aidan Ross 38'; Quinn Tupaea 68'; Josh Ioane 80'; Con: Damian McKenzie (1/1) 39'; Josh Ioane (0/2); Cards: Aidan Ross (yellow card) 18'

Eden Park, Auckland
Attendance: 19,433
Referee: Ben O'Keeffe (New Zealand)

1 June 2024
17:35 (UTC+8)

Force	19–24	Brumbies
Try: Carlo Tizzano 34'; Issak Fines-Leleiwasa 78'; George Poolman 80+3'; Con: Bayley Kuenzle (2/2) 35', 80'; Michael Wells (0/1)	Report	Try: Allan Alaalatoa 6'; Corey Toole 11'; Tom Wright 61'; Con: Noah Lolesio (2/2) 7', 12'; Jack Debreczeni (1/1) 63'; Pen: Noah Lolesio (1/1) 39'; Cards: Ryan Lonergan (yellow card) 33'

HBF Park, Perth
Referee: Jordan Way (Australia)

== See also ==
- 2024 Super Rugby Pacific season
