= 2024 Super Rugby Pacific season =

Men's rugby union club competition

2024 Super Rugby Pacific Season
- Dates: 23 February – 22 June 2024
- Countries: Australia (5 teams); Fiji (1 team); New Zealand (5 teams); Pacific Islands (1 team)
- Tournament format(s): Round-robin and Knockout
- Champions: Blues (4th title)
- Matches played: 91
- Tries scored: 663 (7.29 per match)
- Top point scorer(s): (New Zealand) Damian McKenzie, Chiefs (177)
- Top try scorer(s): (New Zealand) Sevu Reece, Crusaders (New Zealand) Hoskins Sotutu, Blues (both 12)
- Official website: super.rugby/superrugby

The 2024 Super Rugby Pacific season (known as Shop N Save Super Rugby Pacific in Fiji and DHL Super Rugby Pacific in New Zealand) was the 29th season of Super Rugby, an annual rugby union competition organised by SANZAAR between teams from Australia, Fiji, New Zealand and a combined team from Samoa, Tonga and other Pacific Island nations. The defending champions were the Crusaders, who won their twelfth title in 2023. The season ran from Friday 23 February 2024, culminating in a final played on Saturday 22 June, before the start of the 2024 mid-year international window.

== Format ==
The competition format continued from the previous season, with the fixture list being the only change. Twelve teams played in a round-robin format, with seven matches at home and seven away, although the second round (called "Super Round") will be played at AAMI Park, Melbourne. The fourteen games included eleven regular round-robin matches against the other participating teams and three additional "rivalry" games, in which they played another team for the second time in a home-and-away format. Each team also had one bye week, making a total of fifteen rounds.

At the conclusion of the fifteenth round, the eight highest ranked teams on the competition table advanced to the quarter-finals, in which the first-ranked team played the eighth-ranked team, the second-ranked team played the seventh-ranked, the third-ranked played the sixth-ranked and the fourth-ranked team played the fifth-ranked. The quarter-final winners progressed to the semi-finals, and the winners of the semi-finals advanced to the final. The higher ranked team hosted each play-off match.

The rankings on the competition table were determined by the number of competition points earned during the regular season. Competition points could be gained in the following way: four points were awarded to the winning team, two points to each team for a draw, and no points for a loss. Teams could also receive a singular bonus point if they scored at least three tries more than the opponent in a match, or lost by seven points or less.

== Standings ==
The current standings for the 2024 Super Rugby Pacific season are:

2024 Super Rugby Pacific standings
Pos	Team	Pld	W	D	L	PF	PA	PD	TF	TA	TB	LB	Pts	Qualification
1	Hurricanes	14	12	0	2	480	281	+199	70	38	7	1	56	Quarter-finals
2	Blues (C)	14	12	0	2	488	233	+255	72	31	6	1	55	Quarter-finals
3	Brumbies	14	12	0	2	410	311	+99	54	41	4	0	52	Quarter-finals
4	Chiefs (RU)	14	9	0	5	486	311	+175	66	43	5	2	43	Quarter-finals
5	Reds	14	8	0	6	444	340	+104	66	46	4	4	40	Quarter-finals
6	Highlanders	14	6	0	8	305	402	−97	37	54	2	2	28	Quarter-finals
7	Drua	14	6	0	8	325	427	−102	40	60	1	1	26	Quarter-finals
8	Rebels	14	5	0	9	341	488	−147	49	67	4	2	26	Quarter-finals
9	Crusaders	14	4	0	10	363	369	−6	51	42	2	6	24	
10	Force	14	4	0	10	294	426	−132	37	62	1	3	20	
11	Moana Pasifika	14	4	0	10	265	485	−220	35	71	0	2	18	
12	Waratahs	14	2	0	12	306	434	−128	38	60	0	5	13	

Source: Super Rugby
(C) Champions; (RU) Runners-up;

Competition rules
Competition points breakdown:
* 4 competition points for a win
* 2 competition points for a draw
* 1 competition bonus point for a loss by seven points or less
* 1 competition bonus point for scoring at least three tries more than the opponent in a match
Tiebreaker rules:
If, at any stage, teams have the same number of competition points, the following tiebreaker rules apply (in this order) to determine their standing:
* Most wins from all matches
* Highest difference between total points for and total points against from all matches (points difference)
* Most tries scored from all matches
* Highest difference between total tries for and total tries against from all matches
* Coin toss

=== Round-by-round ===
The table below shows each team's progression throughout the season. For each round, their cumulative points total is shown with the overall table position in brackets:

Team progression
Team	R1	R2	R3	R4	R5	R6	R7	R8	R9	R10	R11	R12	R13	R14	R15	QF	SF	Final
Blues	5 (3rd)	9 (3rd)	9 (5th)	13 (4th)	17 (4th)	22 (2nd)	27 (1st)	27 (2nd)	32 (2nd)	36 (2nd)	41 (2nd)	45 (1st)	50 (1st)	51 (1st)	55 (2nd)	Won	Won	Won
Brumbies	5 (2nd)	5 (6th)	9 (7th)	13 (5th)	18 (3rd)	22 (3rd)	27 (3rd)	27 (3rd)	27 (3rd)	31 (3rd)	35 (3rd)	39 (3rd)	43 (3rd)	48 (3rd)	52 (3rd)	Won	Lost	DNQ
Chiefs	4 (6th)	9 (1st)	10 (2nd)	14 (3rd)	18 (2nd)	18 (4th)	23 (4th)	23 (5th)	23 (5th)	28 (4th)	33 (4th)	38 (4th)	42 (4th)	43 (4th)	43 (4th)	Won	Won	Lost
Crusaders	1 (7th)	1 (10th)	1 (11th)	2 (11th)	2 (12th)	6 (11th)	6 (11th)	7 (11th)	7 (12th)	12 (10th)	13 (10th)	14 (11th)	15 (10th)	19 (10th)	24 (9th)	DNQ	DNQ	DNQ
Drua	0 (10th)	1 (11th)	5 (10th)	5 (10th)	9 (8th)	13 (7th)	13 (7th)	13 (7th)	13 (7th)	17 (7th)	17 (8th)	17 (8th)	21 (8th)	21 (8th)	26 (7th)	Lost	DNQ	DNQ
Force	0 (12th)	0 (12th)	1 (12th)	1 (12th)	5 (11th)	5 (12th)	5 (12th)	5 (12th)	9 (11th)	10 (12th)	10 (12th)	15 (9th)	19 (9th)	19 (9th)	20 (10th)	DNQ	DNQ	DNQ
Highlanders	5 (5th)	5 (5th)	9 (6th)	10 (6th)	11 (6th)	11 (8th)	11 (8th)	11 (10th)	11 (10th)	15 (8th)	19 (7th)	23 (7th)	23 (7th)	28 (6th)	28 (6th)	Lost	DNQ	DNQ
Hurricanes	5 (1st)	9 (2nd)	13 (1st)	17 (1st)	22 (1st)	27 (1st)	27 (2nd)	32 (1st)	37 (1st)	37 (1st)	42 (1st)	43 (2nd)	47 (2nd)	51 (2nd)	56 (1st)	Won	Lost	DNQ
Moana Pasifika	0 (8th)	4 (9th)	5 (9th)	9 (8th)	9 (9th)	9 (9th)	9 (9th)	13 (8th)	13 (8th)	14 (9th)	14 (9th)	14 (10th)	14 (11th)	18 (11th)	18 (11th)	DNQ	DNQ	DNQ
Rebels	0 (11th)	5 (7th)	10 (4th)	10 (7th)	10 (7th)	14 (6th)	19 (5th)	24 (4th)	24 (4th)	24 (5th)	24 (6th)	25 (6th)	26 (6th)	26 (7th)	26 (8th)	Lost	DNQ	DNQ
Reds	5 (4th)	6 (4th)	10 (3rd)	15 (2nd)	15 (5th)	16 (5th)	16 (6th)	17 (6th)	22 (6th)	23 (6th)	27 (5th)	31 (5th)	31 (5th)	36 (5th)	40 (5th)	Lost	DNQ	DNQ
Waratahs	0 (9th)	4 (8th)	5 (8th)	6 (9th)	7 (10th)	8 (10th)	8 (10th)	12 (9th)	12 (9th)	12 (11th)	12 (11th)	12 (12th)	12 (12th)	12 (12th)	13 (12th)	DNQ	DNQ	DNQ
Key:	Win	Draw	Loss	Bye	DNQ = Did not qualify													

== Matches ==
Home \ Away	BLU	BRU	CHI	CRU	DRU	FOR	HIG	HUR	MOA	REB	RED	WAR
Blues	—	46–7	31–17	26–6	34–10	50–3	47–13	31–27	—	—	—	—
Brumbies	—	—	—	31–24	28–20	22–19	—	27–19	60–21	53–17	—	40–16
Chiefs	—	46–12	—	33–29	46–29	56–7	28–21	17–20	68–12	—	—	—
Crusaders	29–27	—	37–26	—	—	—	—	10–14	43–10	39–0	28–33	24–37
Drua	—	—	—	20–10	—	31–13	—	15–38	24–17	40–19	28–19	39–36
Force	—	19–24	—	37–15	48–10	—	—	14–44	14–22	—	40–31	27–7
Highlanders	29–37	21–27	—	32–29	39–3	7–6	—	12–47	35–21	—	—	—
Hurricanes	29–21	—	36–23	—	—	—	41–14	—	32–24	54–28	38–33	41–12
Moana Pasifika	8–47	—	7–43	—	39–36	—	17–28	—	—	23–29	17–14	27–12
Rebels	11–38	3–30	23–26	—	41–20	48–34	47–31	—	—	—	26–53	—
Reds	34–41	19–20	25–19	—	—	59–13	31–0	—	—	26–22	—	40–22
Waratahs	10–12	21–29	22–38	43–40	—	—	21–23	—	—	21–27	26–27	—

Updated to match(es) played on Saturday 1 June 2024. Source: Super Rugby
Legend: Blue = home team win; Yellow = draw; Red = away team win.

== Finals ==
Quarter-finals
8 June – Wellington
Hurricanes	47
Rebels	20
7 June – Hamilton
Chiefs	43
Reds	21
8 June – Canberra
Brumbies	32
Highlanders	16
8 June – Auckland
Blues	36
Drua	5

Semi-finals
15 June – Wellington
Hurricanes	19
Chiefs	30
14 June – Auckland
Brumbies	20
Blues	34

Final
22 June – Auckland
Chiefs	10
Blues	41

=== Quarter-finals ===
7 June 2024
19:05 (UTC+12)

Chiefs	43–21	Reds
Try: Samisoni Taukei'aho (2) 6', 16'; Emoni Narawa 10'; Etene Nanai-Seturo 23'; Anton Lienert-Brown 52'; Bradley Slater 63'; Con: Damian McKenzie (5/6) 7', 12', 18', 24', 53'; Pen: Damian McKenzie (1/1) 40+1'	Report	Try: Tate McDermott 44', 55'; Lawson Creighton 74'; Con: Tom Lynagh (1/1) 45'; Lawson Creighton (2/2) 55', 75'; Cards: Hunter Paisami (yellow card) 62'

FMG Stadium Waikato, Hamilton
Attendance: 11,639
Referee: Ben O'Keeffe (New Zealand)

8 June 2024
16:35 (UTC+12)

Hurricanes	47–20	Rebels
Try: Pasilio Tosi 25'; Josh Moorby 40'; Brayden Iose 44'; Asafo Aumua 54'; Devan Flanders 57'; Du'Plessis Kirifi 72'; Kini Naholo 78'; Con: Brett Cameron (6/7) 26', 40+1', 45', 55', 58', 73'	Report	Try: Lachie Anderson (2) 66', 68'; Con: Carter Gordon (2/2) 67', 69'; Pen: Carter Gordon (2/2) 9', 28'

Sky Stadium, Wellington
Attendance: 13,853
Referee: James Doleman (New Zealand)

8 June 2024
19:05 (UTC+12)

Blues	36–5	Drua
Try: Dalton Papalii 9'; Finlay Christie 18'; Caleb Clarke (2) 35', 78'; Kurt Eklund 64'; Con: Harry Plummer (3/4) 10', 20', 65'; Stephen Perofeta (1/1) 79'; Pen: Harry Plummer (1/1) 23'	Report	Try: Selestino Ravutaumada 43'; Con: Isaiah Armstrong-Ravula (0/1); Pen: Isaiah Armstrong-Ravula (0/1)

Eden Park, Auckland
Attendance: 16,533
Referee: Nic Berry (Australia)

8 June 2024
19:35 (UTC+10)

Brumbies	32–16	Highlanders
Try: Andy Muirhead (2) 15', 47'; Billy Pollard (2) 40+1', 44'; Con: Noah Lolesio (3/4) 16', 40+2', 49'; Pen: Noah Lolesio (2/3) 32', 64'	Report	Try: Jona Nareki 33'; Con: Cam Millar (1/1) 35'; Pen: Cam Millar (3/3) 3', 21', 26'

GIO Stadium, Canberra
Attendance: 8,817
Referee: Angus Gardner (Australia)

=== Semi-finals ===
14 June 2024
19:05 (UTC+12)

Blues	34–20	Brumbies
Try: AJ Lam 2'; Ricky Riccitelli 8'; Sam Darry 14'; Caleb Clarke 21'; Hoskins Sotutu 59'; Con: Harry Plummer (3/5) 9', 15', 60'; Pen: Harry Plummer (1/1) 40'	Report	Try: Rob Valetini 36'; Luke Reimer 69'; Con: Noah Lolesio (2/2) 37', 70'; Pen: Noah Lolesio (2/2) 6', 12'; Cards: Nick Frost (yellow card) 72'

Eden Park, Auckland
Attendance: 12,682
Referee: James Doleman (New Zealand)

15 June 2024
16:35 (UTC+12)

Hurricanes	19–30	Chiefs
Try: Peter Lakai 20'; Brett Cameron 55'; Billy Proctor 71'; Con: Brett Cameron (2/3) 22', 56'	Report	Try: Samipeni Finau 3'; Cortez Ratima 6'; Daniel Rona 62'; Con: Damian McKenzie (3/3) 5', 7', 63'; Pen: Damian McKenzie (3/3) 15', 46', 65'; Cards: Samipeni Finau (yellow card) 24'; Luke Jacobson (yellow card) 49'

Sky Stadium, Wellington
Attendance: 23,563
Referee: Angus Gardner (Australia)

=== Final ===
22 June 2024
19:05 (UTC+12)

Blues	41–10	Chiefs
Try: Akira Ioane 12'; Caleb Clarke (3) 22', 51', 62'; AJ Lam 73'; Con: Harry Plummer (5/5) 13', 22', 52', 63', 74'; Pen: Harry Plummer (2/2) 16', 40'	Report	Try: Simon Parker 66'; Con: Damian McKenzie (1/1) 67'; Pen: Damian McKenzie (1/2) 19'; Cards: George Dyer (yellow card) 51'

Eden Park, Auckland
Attendance: 41,975
Referee: Nic Berry (Australia)

== Statistics ==
As of 22 June 2024

=== Leading point scorers ===
No.	Player	Team	Points	Average	Details
1	(New Zealand) Damian McKenzie	(New Zealand) Chiefs	177	11.80	2 T, 49 C, 23 P, 0 D
2	(Australia) Noah Lolesio	(Australia) Brumbies	150	10.00	1 T, 41 C, 21 P, 0 D
3	(Australia) Ben Donaldson	(Australia) Force	111	8.54	2 T, 25 C, 17 P, 0 D
4	(New Zealand) Harry Plummer	(New Zealand) Blues	110	6.47	0 T, 43 C, 8 P, 0 D
5	(Fiji) Isaiah Armstrong-Ravula	(Fiji) Drua	106	7.57	0 T, 26 C, 18 P, 0 D
5	(New Zealand) Brett Cameron	(New Zealand) Hurricanes	106	8.15	2 T, 39 C, 6 P, 0 D
7	(Australia) Carter Gordon	(Australia) Rebels	96	7.38	4 T, 26 C, 8 P, 0 D
8	(Australia) Tane Edmed	(Australia) Waratahs	91	7.00	1 T, 19 C, 16 P, 0 D
9	(New Zealand) Sam Gilbert	(New Zealand) Highlanders	78	5.57	1 T, 23 C, 9 P, 0 D
9	(Tonga) William Havili	(New Zealand) Moana Pasifika	78	6.00	2 T, 16 C, 12 P, 0 D

Source: Points

=== Leading try scorers ===
No.	Player	Team	Tries	Average
1	(New Zealand) Sevu Reece	(New Zealand) Crusaders	12	0.92
1	(New Zealand) Hoskins Sotutu	(New Zealand) Blues	12	0.75
3	(New Zealand) Caleb Clarke	(New Zealand) Blues	10	0.67
3	(New Zealand) Emoni Narawa	(New Zealand) Chiefs	10	0.91
3	(Australia) Tom Wright	(Australia) Brumbies	10	0.63
6	(New Zealand) Cortez Ratima	(New Zealand) Chiefs	9	0.56
6	(Australia) Tim Ryan	(Australia) Reds	9	1.00
6	(New Zealand) Mark Tele'a	(New Zealand) Blues	9	0.60
9	(Australia) Matt Faessler	(Australia) Reds	8	0.57
9	(New Zealand) Jacob Ratumaitavuki-Kneepkens	(New Zealand) Highlanders	8	0.53
9	(New Zealand) Salesi Rayasi	(New Zealand) Hurricanes	8	0.62
9	(Australia) Corey Toole	(Australia) Brumbies	8	0.62

Source: Tries

=== Discipline ===
Player	Team	Red	Yellow	Round (vs. opponent)
(Fiji) Frank Lomani	(Fiji) Drua	1	1	Round 7 (vs. Rebels); Round 15 (vs. Rebels)
(Australia) Suliasi Vunivalu	(Australia) Reds	1	1	Round 13 (vs. Drua); Round 13 (vs. Drua)
(Samoa) Nigel Ah Wong	(New Zealand) Moana Pasifika	1	0	Round 2 (vs. Drua)
(New Zealand) Jordie Barrett	(New Zealand) Hurricanes	1	0	Round 2 (vs. Reds)
(New Zealand) Owen Franks	(New Zealand) Crusaders	1	0	Round 4 (vs. Hurricanes)
(Fiji) Tevita Ikanivere	(Fiji) Drua	1	0	Round 6 (vs. Force)
(Fiji) Jone Koroiduadua	(Fiji) Drua	1	0	Round 7 (vs. Rebels)
(Fiji) Frank Lomani	(Fiji) Drua	1	0	Round 7 (vs. Rebels)
(Australia) Tate McDermott	(Australia) Reds	1	0	Round 8 (vs. Moana Pasifika)
(Australia) Fraser McReight	(Australia) Reds	1	0	Round 8 (vs. Moana Pasifika)
(New Zealand) Jared Proffit	(New Zealand) Chiefs	1	0	Round 2 (vs. Brumbies)
(New Zealand) Tanielu Teleʻa	(New Zealand) Highlanders	1	0	Round 5 (vs. Chiefs)
(New Zealand) Raymond Tuputupu	(New Zealand) Hurricanes	1	0	Round 14 (vs. Chiefs)
(New Zealand) Jacob Ratumaitavuki-Kneepkens	(New Zealand) Highlanders	0	3	Round 2 (vs. Blues); Round 6 (vs. Hurricanes); Round 8 (vs. Rebels)
(New Zealand) Kaylum Boshier	(New Zealand) Chiefs	0	2	Round 11 (vs. Force); Round 14 (vs. Hurricanes)
(New Zealand) Jamie Hannah	(New Zealand) Crusaders	0	2	Round 4 (vs. Hurricanes); Round 12 (vs. Highlanders)
(Australia) Len Ikitau	(Australia) Brumbies	0	2	Round 1 (vs. Rebels); Round 14 (vs. Rebels)
(New Zealand) Luke Jacobson	(New Zealand) Chiefs	0	2	Round 5 (vs. Highlanders); Semi-final (vs. Hurricanes)
(Australia) Hunter Paisami	(Australia) Reds	0	2	Round 12 (vs. Rebels); Quarter-final (vs. Chiefs)
(Australia) Harry Potter	(Australia) Force	0	2	Round 1 (vs. Hurricanes); Round 3 (vs. Brumbies)
(Australia) Hamish Stewart	(Australia) Force	0	2	Round 11 (vs. Chiefs); Round 14 (vs. Reds)
(Australia) Carlo Tizzano	(Australia) Force	0	2	Round 4 (vs. Moana Pasifika); Round 9 (vs. Crusaders)
(New Zealand) Tamati Tua	(Australia) Brumbies	0	2	Round 13 (vs. Crusaders); Round 14 (vs. Rebels)
(New Zealand) Tupou Vaa'i	(New Zealand) Chiefs	0	2	Round 10 (vs. Waratahs); Round 13 (vs. Rebels)
(Australia) Brad Amituanai	(Australia) Waratahs	0	1	Round 13 (vs. Force)
(Australia) Lachie Anderson	(Australia) Rebels	0	1	Round 12 (vs. Reds)
(Fiji) Isaiah Armstrong-Ravula	(Fiji) Drua	0	1	Round 1 (vs. Blues)
(New Zealand) Jahrome Brown	(Australia) Brumbies	0	1	Round 14 (vs. Rebels)
(Fiji) Elia Canakaivata	(Fiji) Drua	0	1	Round 6 (vs. Force)
(Australia) Josh Canham	(Australia) Rebels	0	1	Round 2 (vs. Force)
(New Zealand) Finlay Christie	(New Zealand) Blues	0	1	Round 1 (vs. Drua)
(New Zealand) Allan Craig	(New Zealand) Moana Pasifika	0	1	Round 3 (vs. Waratahs)
(Australia) Filipo Daugunu	(Australia) Rebels	0	1	Round 1 (vs. Brumbies)
(New Zealand) Caleb Delany	(New Zealand) Hurricanes	0	1	Round 9 (vs. Drua)
(Fiji) Mesake Doge	(Fiji) Drua	0	1	Round 10 (vs. Moana Pasifika)
(Fiji) Ilaisa Droasese	(Fiji) Drua	0	1	Round 14 (vs. Highlanders)
(New Zealand) George Dyer	(New Zealand) Chiefs	0	1	Final (vs. Blues)
(New Zealand) Folau Fakatava	(New Zealand) Highlanders	0	1	Round 12 (vs. Crusaders)
(New Zealand) Chay Fihaki	(New Zealand) Crusaders	0	1	Round 2 (vs. Waratahs)
(New Zealand) Samipeni Finau	(New Zealand) Chiefs	0	1	Semi-final (vs. Hurricanes)
(New Zealand) Nick Frost	(Australia) Brumbies	0	1	Semi-final (vs. Blues)
(New Zealand) Taufa Funaki	(New Zealand) Blues	0	1	Round 9 (vs. Brumbies)
(New Zealand) Connor Garden-Bachop	(New Zealand) Highlanders	0	1	Round 15 (vs. Hurricanes)
(New Zealand) Dominic Gardiner	(New Zealand) Crusaders	0	1	Round 2 (vs. Waratahs)
(New Zealand) Sam Gilbert	(New Zealand) Highlanders	0	1	Round 15 (vs. Hurricanes)
(Tonga) Aisea Halo	(New Zealand) Moana Pasifika	0	1	Round 12 (vs. Chiefs)
(New Zealand) Bryce Heem	(New Zealand) Blues	0	1	Round 10 (vs. Reds)
(England) Willi Heinz	(New Zealand) Crusaders	0	1	Round 5 (vs. Blues)
(Netherlands) Fabian Holland	(New Zealand) Highlanders	0	1	Round 1 (vs. Moana Pasifika)
(Tonga) Fine Inisi	(New Zealand) Moana Pasifika	0	1	Round 15 (vs. Crusaders)
(New Zealand) Akira Ioane	(New Zealand) Blues	0	1	Round 12 (vs. Hurricanes)
(Australia) Harry Johnson-Holmes	(Australia) Waratahs	0	1	Round 2 (vs. Crusaders)
(Australia) Max Jorgensen	(Australia) Waratahs	0	1	Round 1 (vs. Reds)
(Australia) Sekope Kepu	(New Zealand) Moana Pasifika	0	1	Round 2 (vs. Drua)
(New Zealand) Du'Plessis Kirifi	(New Zealand) Hurricanes	0	1	Round 9 (vs. Drua)
(Australia) Darby Lancaster	(Australia) Rebels	0	1	Round 14 (vs. Brumbies)
(New Zealand) Ryan Lonergan	(Australia) Brumbies	0	1	Round 15 (vs. Force)
(Fiji) Ratu Peni Matawalu	(Fiji) Drua	0	1	Round 5 (vs. Waratahs)
(Wales) Johnny McNicholl	(New Zealand) Crusaders	0	1	Round 8 (vs. Waratahs)
(New Zealand) Cam Millar	(New Zealand) Highlanders	0	1	Round 12 (vs. Crusaders)
(New Zealand) Joe Moody	(New Zealand) Crusaders	0	1	Round 15 (vs. Moana Pasifika)
(New Zealand) Kini Naholo	(New Zealand) Hurricanes	0	1	Round 14 (vs. Chiefs)
(New Zealand) Etene Nanai-Seturo	(New Zealand) Chiefs	0	1	Round 10 (vs. Waratahs)
(New Zealand) Emoni Narawa	(New Zealand) Chiefs	0	1	Round 8 (vs. Hurricanes)
(Australia) Mark Nawaqanitawase	(Australia) Waratahs	0	1	Round 5 (vs. Drua)
(Australia) Rhys van Nek	(Australia) Brumbies	0	1	Round 6 (vs. Reds)
(New Zealand) Sam Nock	(New Zealand) Blues	0	1	Round 2 (vs. Highlanders)
(New Zealand) Jacob Norris	(New Zealand) Moana Pasifika	0	1	Round 3 (vs. Waratahs)
(New Zealand) Ollie Norris	(New Zealand) Chiefs	0	1	Round 4 (vs. Drua)
(New Zealand) Dalton Papalii	(New Zealand) Blues	0	1	Round 5 (vs. Crusaders)
(Australia) Irie Papuni	(New Zealand) Moana Pasifika	0	1	Round 12 (vs. Chiefs)
(Australia) Marley Pearce	(Australia) Force	0	1	Round 1 (vs. Hurricanes)
(New Zealand) Stephen Perofeta	(New Zealand) Blues	0	1	Round 14 (vs. Crusaders)
(New Zealand) Harry Plummer	(New Zealand) Blues	0	1	Round 11 (vs. Rebels)
(New Zealand) Reed Prinsep	(Australia) Force	0	1	Round 14 (vs. Reds)
(New Zealand) Billy Proctor	(New Zealand) Hurricanes	0	1	Round 1 (vs. Force)
(Fiji) Selestino Ravutaumada	(Fiji) Drua	0	1	Round 2 (vs. Moana Pasifika)
(New Zealand) Sevu Reece	(New Zealand) Crusaders	0	1	Round 5 (vs. Blues)
(New Zealand) Aidan Ross	(New Zealand) Chiefs	0	1	Round 15 (vs. Blues)
(Fiji) Ratu Leone Rotuisolia	(Fiji) Drua	0	1	Round 7 (vs. Rebels)
(Fiji) Kitione Salawa Jr.	(Fiji) Drua	0	1	Round 5 (vs. Waratahs)
(Australia) Ollie Sapsford	(Australia) Brumbies	0	1	Round 5 (vs. Moana Pasifika)
(Australia) Hugh Sinclair	(Australia) Waratahs	0	1	Round 6 (vs. Rebels)
(Australia) James Slipper	(Australia) Brumbies	0	1	Round 9 (vs. Blues)
(New Zealand) Hoskins Sotutu	(New Zealand) Blues	0	1	Round 15 (vs. Chiefs)
(New Zealand) Quinten Strange	(New Zealand) Crusaders	0	1	Round 13 (vs. Brumbies)
(Fiji) Timoci Tavatavanawai	(New Zealand) Highlanders	0	1	Round 5 (vs. Chiefs)
(Australia) Harry Vella	(Australia) Brumbies	0	1	Round 11 (vs. Drua)
(New Zealand) Isaia Walker-Leawere	(New Zealand) Hurricanes	0	1	Round 9 (vs. Drua)
(Australia) Nic White	(Australia) Force	0	1	Round 12 (vs. Drua)

== Players ==
=== Squads ===
The following squads have been named. Players listed in italics denote non-original squad members:

Blues squad
Forwards	Josh Beehre • Adrian Choat • Sam Darry • Kurt Eklund • Josh Fusitua • Akira Ioane • Jordan Lay • Laghlan McWhannell • Dalton Papalii • Marcel Renata • Ricky Riccitelli • Rob Rush • Anton Segner • PJ Sheck • Hoskins Sotutu • Cameron Suafoa • Angus Taʻavao • James Thompson • Patrick Tuipulotu • Mason Tupaea • Ofa Tuʻungafasi • Soane Vikena
Backs	Kade Banks • Lucas Cashmore • Finlay Christie • Caleb Clarke • Corey Evans • Cole Forbes • Taufa Funaki • Meihana Grindlay • Bryce Heem • Rieko Ioane • AJ Lam • Sam Nock • Stephen Perofeta • Harry Plummer • Zarn Sullivan • Caleb Tangitau • Mark Tele'a
Coach	Vern Cotter

Brumbies squad
Forwards	Allan Alaalatoa • Liam Bowron • Jahrome Brown • Charlie Cale • Nick Frost • Tom Hooper • Fred Kaihea • Sefo Kautai • Ed Kennedy • Lachlan Lonergan • Connal McInerney • Cadeyrn Neville • Billy Pollard • Luke Reimer • Blake Schoupp • Rory Scott • Lachlan Shaw • James Slipper • Darcy Swain • Rob Valetini • Rhys van Nek • Harry Vella
Backs	Austin Anderson • Hudson Creighton • Jack Debreczeni • Harrison Goddard • Len Ikitau • Noah Lolesio • Ryan Lonergan • Declan Meredith • Andy Muirhead • Ben O'Donnell • Ollie Sapsford • Klayton Thorn • Corey Toole • Tamati Tua • Tom Wright
Coach	Stephen Larkham

Chiefs squad
Forwards	Naitoa Ah Kuoi • Sione Ahio • Kaylum Boshier • Hamilton Burr • George Dyer • Samipeni Finau • Tom Florence • Luke Jacobson • Kauvaka Kaivelata • Josh Lord • Ollie Norris • Reuben O'Neill • Simon Parker • Jared Proffit • Aidan Ross • Mills Sanerivi • Manaaki Selby-Rickit • Wallace Sititi • Bradley Slater • Samisoni Taukei'aho • Tyrone Thompson • Jimmy Tupou • Tupou Vaa'i • Malachi Wrampling-Alec
Backs	Liam Coombes-Fabling • Josh Ioane • Josh Jacomb • Anton Lienert-Brown • Peniasi Malimali • Damian McKenzie • Etene Nanai-Seturo • Emoni Narawa • Rameka Poihipi • Cortez Ratima • Xavier Roe • Daniel Rona • Shaun Stevenson • Te Toiroa Tahuriorangi • Kaleb Trask • Quinn Tupaea • Gideon Wrampling
Coach	Clayton McMillan

Crusaders squad
Forwards	Fletcher Anderson • Scott Barrett • George Bell • Ethan Blackadder • George Bower • Finlay Brewis • Tahlor Cahill • Seb Calder • Tom Christie • Owen Franks • Zach Gallagher • Dominic Gardiner • Cullen Grace • Jamie Hannah • Corey Kellow • Christian Lio-Willie • Quentin MacDonald • Brodie McAlister • Ioane Moananu • Joe Moody • James Mullan • Fletcher Newell • Antonio Shalfoon • Quinten Strange • Kershawl Sykes-Martin • Codie Taylor • Tamaiti Williams
Backs	Toby Arnold • Levi Aumua • Fergus Burke • Ryan Crotty • Mitchell Drummond • Chay Fihaki • Leigh Halfpenny • David Havili • Willi Heinz • Riley Hohepa • Noah Hotham • Will Jordan • Taha Kemara • Manasa Mataele • Dallas McLeod • Johnny McNicholl • Heremaia Murray • Sevu Reece • Rivez Reihana • Taine Robinson • Jone Rova • Macca Springer
Coach	Rob Penney

Drua squad
Forwards	Elia Canakaivata • Te Ahiwaru Cirikidaveta • Meli Derenalagi • Mesake Doge • Mesu Dolokoto • Haereiti Hetet • Tevita Ikanivere • Jone Koroiduadua • Vilive Miramira • Motikai Murray • Isoa Nasilasila • Livai Natave • Ratu Leone Rotuisolia • Kitione Salawa Jr. • Samu Tawake • Zuriel Togiatama • Meli Tuni • Emosi Tuqiri • Sailosi Vakalokalo • Mesake Vocevoce • Etonia Waqa
Backs	Isaiah Armstrong-Ravula • Philip Baselala • Ilaisa Droasese • Simione Kuruvoli • Frank Lomani • Iosefo Masi • Ratu Peni Matawalu • Epeli Momo • Caleb Muntz • Michael Naitokani • Waqa Nalaga • Isikeli Rabitu • Taniela Rakuro • Junior Ratuva • Selestino Ravutaumada • Tuidraki Samusamuvodre • Moses Sorovi • Kemu Valetini • Apisalome Vota
Coach	Mick Byrne

Force squad
Forwards	Siosifa Amone • Tim Anstee • Josh Bartlett • Ollie Callan • Sam Carter • Ryan Coxon • Lopeti Faifua • Tom Franklin • Ben Funnell • Charlie Hancock • Will Harris • Joel Hintz • Harry Hoopert • Tom Horton • Feleti Kaitu'u • Felix Kalapu • Santiago Medrano • Atu Moli • Titi Nofoagatotoa • Marley Pearce • Reed Prinsep • Izack Rodda • Papillon Sevele • Tiaan Tauakipulu • Carlo Tizzano • Angus Wagner • Michael Wells • Jeremy Williams
Backs	Kurtley Beale • Max Burey • Ollie Cummins • Ben Donaldson • Issak Fines-Leleiwasa • Nikolai Foliaki • Bayley Kuenzle • Ronan Leahy • Henry O'Donnell • Campbell Parata • Reesjan Pasitoa • George Poolman • Harry Potter • Ian Prior • Sam Spink • Hamish Stewart • Chase Tiatia • Nic White
Coach	Simon Cron

Highlanders squad
Forwards	Jermaine Ainsley • Henry Bell • Nikora Broughton • Ethan de Groot • Mitchell Dunshea • Oliver Haig • Billy Harmon • Max Hicks • Fabian Holland • Ricky Jackson • Ayden Johnstone • Daniel Lienert-Brown • Saula Ma'u • Hayden Michaels • Pari Pari Parkinson • Hugo Plummer • Hugh Renton • Tom Sanders • Will Stodart • Jack Taylor • Will Tucker • Solomone Tukuafu • Rohan Wingham • Sean Withy
Backs	James Arscott • Martín Bogado • Folau Fakatava • Ajay Faleafaga • Connor Garden-Bachop • Sam Gilbert • Nathan Hastie • Finn Hurley • Jonah Lowe • Cam Millar • Jona Nareki • Rhys Patchell • Jacob Ratumaitavuki-Kneepkens • Timoci Tavatavanawai • Jake Te Hiwi • Tanielu Teleʻa • Josh Timu • Matt Whaanga
Coach	Clarke Dermody

Hurricanes squad
Forwards	Asafo Aumua • Caleb Delany • Jacob Devery • Devan Flanders • Ben Grant • TK Howden • Brayden Iose • Kianu Kereru-Symes • Du'Plessis Kirifi • Peter Lakai • Veveni Lasaqa • Siale Lauaki • Tyrel Lomax • Tevita Mafileo • Xavier Numia • James O'Reilly • Pouri Rakete-Stones • Justin Sangster • Brad Shields • Josh Taula • Pasilio Tosi • James Tucker • Raymond Tuputupu • Isaia Walker-Leawere
Backs	Jordie Barrett • Brett Cameron • Harry Godfrey • Riley Higgins • Richard Judd • Ruben Love • Josh Moorby • Aidan Morgan • Kini Naholo • TJ Perenara • Billy Proctor • Ngane Punivai • Salesi Rayasi • Cam Roigard • Daniel Sinkinson • Bailyn Sullivan • Peter Umaga-Jensen • Jordi Viljoen
Coach	Clark Laidlaw

Moana Pasifika squad
Forwards	Suetena Asomua • Donald Brighouse • Allan Craig • Michael Curry • Miracle Faiʻilagi • Ivan Fepuleai • Solomone Funaki • Sione Havili Talitui • Lotu Inisi • Niko Jones • Sekope Kepu • Tevita Langi • Sateki Latu • James Lay • Sione Mafileo • Thomas Maka • Sama Malolo • Sam Moli • Alamanda Motuga • Viliami Napa'a • Jacob Norris • Semisi Paea • Irie Papuni • Abraham Pole • Tom Savage • Sam Slade • Ofa Tauatevalu • Ola Tauelangi
Backs	Nigel Ah Wong • Ere Enari • Viliami Fine • Neria Fomai • Aisea Halo • William Havili • Fine Inisi • Lalomilo Lalomilo • Christian Leali'ifano • D'Angelo Leuila • Melani Matavao • Otumaka Mausia • Siaosi Nginingini • Pepesana Patafilo • Julian Savea • Henry Taefu • Jonathan Taumateine • Kyren Taumoefolau • Danny Toala • Anzelo Tuitavuki
Coach	Tana Umaga

Rebels squad
Forwards	Isaac Aedo Kailea • Luke Callan • Josh Canham • Ethan Dobbins • Vaiolini Ekuasi • Cabous Eloff • Pone Fa'amausili • Matt Gibbon • Zac Hough • Josh Kemeny • Rob Leota • Alex Mafi • Daniel Maiava • Maciu Nabolakasi • Lukhan Salakaia-Loto • Angelo Smith • Sam Talakai • Tuaina Taii Tualima • Taniela Tupou • Jordan Uelese • Brad Wilkin
Backs	Lachie Anderson • Filipo Daugunu • David Feliuai • Carter Gordon • Mason Gordon • Nick Jooste • Andrew Kellaway • Darby Lancaster • Ryan Louwrens • Jack Maunder • Lebron Naea • Divad Palu • Joe Pincus • Matt Proctor • Lukas Ripley • Jake Strachan • James Tuttle • David Vaihu • Glen Vaihu
Coach	Kevin Foote

Reds squad
Forwards	Connor Anderson • Richie Asiata • George Blake • Angus Blyth • Joe Brial • John Bryant • Max Craig • Cormac Daly • Massimo de Lutiis • Sef Fa'agase • Matt Faessler • Alex Hodgman • Fraser McReight • Josh Nasser • Zane Nonggorr • Peni Ravai • Taine Roiri • Ryan Smith • Jeffery Toomaga-Allen • Seru Uru • Connor Vest • Harry Wilson • Liam Wright
Backs	Taj Annan • Floyd Aubrey • Jock Campbell • Lawson Creighton • Josh Flook • Frankie Goldsbrough • Mac Grealy • Isaac Henry • Tom Lynagh • Tate McDermott • Harry McLaughlin-Phillips • James O'Connor • Hunter Paisami • Jordan Petaia • Tim Ryan • Kalani Thomas • Suliasi Vunivalu • Louis Werchon
Coach	Les Kiss

Waratahs squad
Forwards	Miles Amatosero • Brad Amituanai • Jack Barrett • Angus Bell • Daniel Botha • Pone Fa'amausili • Jay Fonokalafi • Theo Fourie • Charlie Gamble • Langi Gleeson • Ned Hanigan • Julian Heaven • Jed Holloway • Archer Holz • Harry Johnson-Holmes • Mesu Kunavula • Tom Lambert • Fergus Lee-Warner • Harry Lloyd • Sione Misiloi • Enrique Pieretto • Lewis Ponini • Dave Porecki • Tom Ross • Paddy Ryan • Michael Scott • Hugh Sinclair • Ned Slack-Smith • Ben Sugars • Lachlan Swinton • Hayden Thompson-Stringer • Sam Thomson • George Thornton • Mahe Vailanu • Hunter Ward
Backs	Jack Bowen • Tane Edmed • Lalakai Foketi • Jake Gordon • Jack Grant • Will Harrison • Max Jorgensen • Vuate Karawalevu • Mark Nawaqanitawase • Izaia Perese • Dylan Pietsch • Triston Reilly • Mosese Tuipulotu • Joey Walton • Harry Wilson • Teddy Wilson
Coach	Darren Coleman

== Referees ==
The following referees were selected to officiate the 2024 Super Rugby Pacific season:

2024 Super Rugby Pacific referees
Australia	Nic Berry • Graham Cooper • Angus Gardner • Reuben Keane • Damon Murphy • Jordan Way
New Zealand	James Doleman • Angus Mabey • Ben O'Keeffe • Brendon Pickerill • Dan Waenga • Paul Williams
