= Harry Vella =

Australian rugby union player (born 2001)

- Born: 7 March 2001 (age 25) Nambour, Australia
- Height: 186 cm (6 ft 1 in)
- Weight: 125 kg (276 lb; 19 st 10 lb)
- School: Nudgee College

Rugby union career
- Position: Prop
- Current team: Brumbies
Senior career
Years	Team	Apps	(Points)
2024–2025	Brumbies	7	(0)
- Correct as of 14 June 2024

Harry Vella (born 7 March 2001) is an Australian rugby union player, who plays for the Brumbies. His preferred position is prop.

== Early life and education ==
Vella is from Nambour and attended St Joseph's College, Nudgee, before playing his club rugby for Canberra Royals. He had previously been a member of the Queensland academy, and represented Australia Schools. He previously worked in a warehouse, where he earned the nickname 'The Forklift' due to his ability to lift heavy objects.

== Professional career ==
Vella was named in the Brumbies squad ahead of the 2024 Super Rugby Pacific season. After a 16-month lay off due to injury, he made his debut in Round 5 of the season against Moana Pasifika.
