= Allan Craig (rugby union) =

New Zealand rugby union player

- Born: 19 April 2002 (age 24) New Zealand
- Height: 196 cm (6 ft 5 in)
- Weight: 112 kg (247 lb; 17 st 9 lb)

Rugby union career
- Position: Lock
- Current team: Northland, Shimizu Koto Blue Sharks
Senior career
Years	Team	Apps	(Points)
2022–	Northland	20	(10)
2024–2026	Moana Pasifika	13	(5)
2026–	Shimizu Koto Blue Sharks	0	(0)
- Correct as of 15 October 2026

Allan Craig (born 19 April 2002) is a New Zealand rugby union player who plays as a lock for the Shimizu Koto Blue Sharks in the Japan Rugby League One.

== Early career ==
Craig plays his club rugby for Mid Northern, having previously been part of the Blues academy. He was selected for a New Zealand U20s testing squad in 2020.

== Professional career ==
Craig has represented Northland in the National Provincial Championship since 2022, being named in their full squad for the 2023 Bunnings NPC. He was called into the Moana Pasifika squad ahead of Round 1 of the 2024 Super Rugby Pacific season, making his debut against the Highlanders.

In October 2026, Craig joined the Shimizu Koto Blue Sharks in Division 2 of the Japan Rugby League One (JRLO).
