= Harry Potter (rugby union) =

Australian rugby union player (born 1997)

- Born: 15 December 1997 (age 28) Wimbledon, London, England
- Height: 185 cm (6 ft 1 in)
- Weight: 95 kg (209 lb; 14 st 13 lb)
- School: Brighton Grammar School
- University: Sydney University

Rugby union career
- Position(s): Centre, Wing, Fullback
- Current team: Waratahs
Youth career
- St Brendan's Old Boys
- Moorabbin
Amateur team(s)
Years	Team	Apps	(Points)
2016–2019	Sydney University	32	(90)
Senior career
Years	Team	Apps	(Points)
2018	NSW Country Eagles	2	(0)
2019	Melbourne Rising	1	(5)
2020	Melbourne Rebels	0	(0)
2020–2023	Leicester Tigers	67	(100)
2024–2025	Western Force	19	(40)
2026–	Waratahs	8	(15)
- Correct as of 30 May 2026
International career
Years	Team	Apps	(Points)
2024–	Australia	18	(20)
- Correct as of 17 October 2026

Harry Potter (born 15 December 1997) is an Australian rugby union player who plays as a wing for the New South Wales Waratahs in the Super Rugby, and the Australia national team. Potter's main position is on the wings, but he has often played at fullback and the centre positions. In October 2024, made his international debut for Australia, becoming Wallaby #989.

== Early life ==
Potter was born in Wimbledon in the South London borough of Merton, England. Potter moved to Bristol in his youth where his early sporting prowess was noted when playing for Rockleaze Rangers Football Club, before moving again this time abroad to Melbourne, Victoria, Australia when he was 10 years old. He played for Brighton Grammar School in his youth career. Contrary to popular belief, he was not named after the Harry Potter book series as that came out 6 months before his birth but his parents selected the name independently.

== Club career ==
In August 2019, Potter was announced to have been included in the full Melbourne Rebels squad for the 2020 season after playing with the Melbourne Rising in the National Rugby Championship.

Potter signed for Premiership Rugby side Leicester Tigers ahead of the 2020–21 season. He made his debut on 22 August 2020 against Bath at Welford Road. He started the 2022 Premiership Rugby final as Tigers beat Saracens 15–12.

On 25 May 2023, it was announced that Potter had left Leicester to pursue an opportunity in Australia. On 1 June 2023 he was confirmed as signing for the Perth-based Western Force in the Super Rugby Pacific. Potter made his debut in the first round of the 2024 season against the Hurricanes. Potter started on the right wing (No. 14). In the third minute of the match Potter tackled fullback Ruben Love mid-air in his attempt to catch a high-ball and was subsequently sin binned. The Force lost at home 14–44. For the remainder of the season Potter started in every match and moved to fullback in his last two matches of the season (Round 5, 6), scoring one try in the process before sustaining a season-ending syndesmosis ankle injury against the Fijian Drua in their round six match. Potter underwent surgery in April and stated that he would likely return to full fitness in mid-July, after the season had already concluded. Potter later made two appearances in the 2024 Toyota Challenge in October against the South African Cheetahs and Emerging Ireland teams, scoring two tries against the former in a 24–38 win in Bloemfontein. The following month Potter was called-up to the Wallabies squad.

In 2025, Potter featured in thirteen of the Force's fourteen regular-season fixtures, scoring seven tries, the second-highest tally within the squad, behind only Carlo Tizzano. Although the 2025 season was disappointing for the Force, who finished ninth on the ladder and fell short of finals qualification, Potter was a standout player for the team, and among the Super Rugby's leading performers that year. Potter was one of just three players to hit a century of carries for the team (112), and one of just 34 players to make 100+ carries in the regular season of Super Rugby in 2025. He also had the best gainline success rate (74%) and the second-most metres per carry (7.0), behind compatriot and ACT Brumbies fullback Tom Wright (7.1). Potter also boasted the second-highest tackle evasion rate: 45% (of players to face 100+ tackles), behind only the Chiefs' Damian McKenzie (51%). His tally of 47 defenders beaten was also third in the league, bettered by only McKenzie (53) and the Highlanders' Timoci Tavatavanawai (78). At the end of the season Potter was named in the 2025 Super Rugby Pacific's Team of the Year.

In July 2025, Potter signed with the New South Wales Waratahs on a two-year deal, beginning in the 2026 season. Ahead of the first round of the 2026 season, Potter was named on the right wing in the Waratahs' clash with rivals the Queensland Reds.

== International career ==
In October 2024, Potter was named in the Australia squad for Autumn Nations Series by head coach Joe Schmidt. In November 2024, he went to make his debut against Scotland, scoring a try as his side went on to lose 27–13.

== Honours ==
Leicester: 1x Gallagher Premiership (2021–22)
