= Aisea Halo =

Tongan rugby union player

- Born: 29 June 1993 (age 33) New Zealand
- Height: 186 cm (6 ft 1 in)
- Weight: 86 kg (190 lb; 13 st 8 lb)

Rugby union career
- Position: Scrum-half
- Current team: Moana Pasifika, North Harbour
Senior career
Years	Team	Apps	(Points)
2021–	North Harbour	6	(0)
2024–	Moana Pasifika		
- Correct as of 19 November 2023
International career
Years	Team	Apps	(Points)
2021–	Tonga	5	(0)
- Correct as of 19 November 2023
National sevens team
Years	Team		Comps
2019–2020	Tonga Sevens		3
- Correct as of 19 November 2023

Aisea Halo (born 29 June 1993) is a Tongan rugby union player, who plays for Moana Pasifika and North Harbour. His preferred position is scrum-half.

== Early career ==
Halo plays his club rugby for the New Zealand Harlequins. He has represented Tonga at Sevens on three occasions before turning professional in the 15-man code.

== Professional career ==
Halo has represented North Harbour in the National Provincial Championship since 2021, being named in their full squad for the 2023 Bunnings NPC. He was named in the Moana Pasifika squad for the 2024 Super Rugby Pacific season.

Halo was first named in the Tonga side ahead of the 2021 fixture against New Zealand. before then featuring in the 2021 end-of-year rugby union internationals against Scotland. He was also named in the side for the 2022 World Rugby Pacific Nations Cup.
