= Junior Ratuva =

Fijian rugby union player (born 1999)

- Born: 15 February 1999 (age 27) Fiji
- Height: 196 cm (6 ft 5 in)
- Weight: 110 kg (243 lb; 17 st 5 lb)

Rugby union career
- Position: Wing
- Current team: Drua
Senior career
Years	Team	Apps	(Points)
2022–2023	Soyaux Angoulême	4	(10)
2024–	Drua	1	(5)
- Correct as of 3 March 2024

Junior Ratuva (born 15 February 1999) is a Fijian rugby union player, who plays for the Drua. His preferred position is wing.

== Early career ==
Ratuva attended King's College in Auckland before moving to Australia to play rugby league, joining the Melbourne Storm academy. He represented the Sunshine Coast Falcons and Redcliffe Dolphins before joining the New Zealand Warriors.

== Professional career ==
Before his stint with the Warriors, Ratuva was named in the Canterbury squad for the 2019 Mitre 10 Cup, but did not make an appearance. He converted back to rugby union in 2022, joining Soyaux Angoulême, making 4 appearances and scoring two tries. He was called into the Drua squad ahead of Round 2 of the 2024 Super Rugby Pacific season, making his debut against Moana Pasifika.
