= Irie Papuni =

Australian rugby union player

- Born: 29 January 2001 (age 25) Australia
- Height: 190 cm (6 ft 3 in)
- Weight: 110 kg (243 lb; 17 st 5 lb)

Rugby union career
- Position(s): Lock, Flanker
- Current team: Moana Pasifika
Senior career
Years	Team	Apps	(Points)
2024–	Moana Pasifika	1	(0)
- Correct as of 3 March 2024

Irie Papuni (born 29 January 2001) is an Australian rugby union player, of Maori & Tongan heritage, who plays for Moana Pasifika. His preferred position is lock or flanker.

== Early career ==
Papuni is of Maori & Tongan heritage, but grew up in Australia. He played his club rugby for Eastern Suburbs before joining Western Sydney Two Blues. He had previously been a member of the Waratahs academy, and represented the Junior Wallabies.

== Professional career ==
Papuni joined the Moana Pasifika for the 2024 Super Rugby Pacific season. He made his debut in Round 2 of the season against the Drua.
