= Mason Gordon =

Australian rugby union player

- Born: 9 March 2003 (age 23) Brisbane, Australia
- Height: 189 cm (6 ft 2 in)
- Weight: 90 kg (198 lb; 14 st 2 lb)
- Notable relative: Carter Gordon (brother)

Rugby union career
- Position: Fly-half / Fullback
- Current team: Reds
Senior career
Years	Team	Apps	(Points)
2024	Rebels	3	(5)
2025	Reds	0	(0)
- Correct as of 8 June 2024
International career
Years	Team	Apps	(Points)
2023	Australia U20	4	(9)
- Correct as of 31 March 2024

Mason Gordon (born 9 March 2003) is a former Australian rugby union player. His preferred position is fly-half or fullback.

== Early career ==
Gordon is from Brisbane and attended Brisbane Boys' College. He signed his first contract out of school, but represented Wests at club level. He represented the Junior Wallabies in both 2022 and 2023.

Gordon signed with the Reds for the 2025 Super Rugby Pacific season.

== Professional career ==
Gordon was named in the Rebels squad ahead of the 2024 Super Rugby Pacific season. He made his debut in Round 5 of the season against the Hurricanes.
