= Sione Ahio =

New Zealand rugby union player

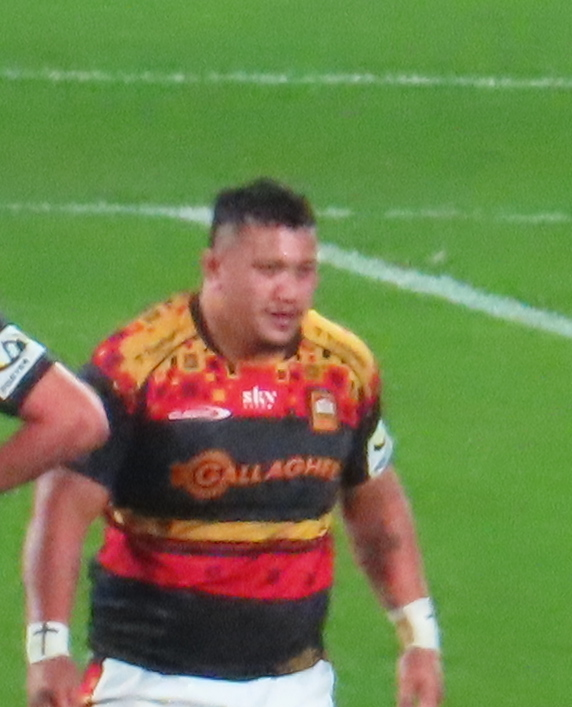
- Ahio playing for the Chiefs in the 2026 Super Rugby Pacific final
- Born: 29 January 2001 (age 25) New Zealand
- Height: 180 cm (5 ft 11 in)
- Weight: 121 kg (267 lb; 19 st 1 lb)

Rugby union career
- Position: Prop
- Current team: Chiefs, Auckland
Senior career
Years	Team	Apps	(Points)
2021–	Auckland	14	(0)
2024–	Chiefs	7	(5)
- Correct as of 9 April 2024

Sione Ahio (born 29 January 2001) is a New Zealand rugby union player, who plays for the Chiefs and Auckland. His preferred position is prop.

== Early career ==
Ahio attended Liston College where he played rugby. He plays his club rugby for Waitemata. He was selected for the New Zealand U20s in 2021.

== Professional career ==
Ahio has represented Auckland in the National Provincial Championship since 2021, being named in their full squad for the 2023 Bunnings NPC. He was named in the Chiefs squad for the 2024 Super Rugby Pacific season.
