= Brad Amituanai =

Australian rugby union player

- Full name: Bradley Amituanai
- Born: Australia
- Height: 180 cm (5 ft 11 in)
- Weight: 125 kg (276 lb)
- School: Newington College

Rugby union career
- Position: Prop
- Current team: Waratahs
Senior career
Years	Team	Apps	(Points)
2024–2025	Waratahs	5	(0)
- Correct as of 11 December 2024

Brad Amituanai is an Australian rugby union player, who plays for the Waratahs. His preferred position is prop.

== Early career ==
Amituanai attended Newington College in Sydney and was a late-developer to rugby, originally playing centre before converting to prop. He represents Sydney University at club level.

== Professional career ==
Amituanai was called into the Waratahs squad ahead of Round 10 of the 2024 Super Rugby Pacific season, making his debut in the same fixture against the Chiefs. He was then named in the full squad for the 2025 Super Rugby Pacific season named in November 2024.
