= Julian Heaven =

Australian rugby union player

- Born: 1 October 2000 (age 26) Sydney, New South Wales, Australia
- Height: 185 cm (6 ft 1 in)
- Weight: 108 kg (238 lb; 17 st 0 lb)
- School: St Joseph's College, Hunters Hill

Rugby union career
- Position: Hooker
- Current team: Exeter Chiefs
Youth career
- Lindfield Junior Rugby Club
- Waratahs Academy
- 2019–2020: Lyon Academy
Amateur team(s)
Years	Team	Apps	(Points)
2021–2023	Easts		
Senior career
Years	Team	Apps	(Points)
2020–2022	Lyon	2	(0)
2024–2025	Waratahs	13	(15)
2025–	Exeter Chiefs	0	(0)
- Correct as of 31 May 2025

Julian Heaven (born 1 October 2000), alternatively spelt Julián Heaven in Spain, is an Australian rugby union player who plays for Exeter Chiefs. His position is hooker.

== Early career ==
Heaven was born in Sydney, New South Wales, Australia and first played rugby at Lindfield Junior Rugby Club. He attended St Joseph's College, Hunters Hill and came through the Waratahs academy. Heaven began his professional career in France's Top 14 with Lyon. While in France Heaven attracted the Spanish Rugby Federation (Real Federación Española de Rugby), thanks to his eligibility via his Spanish grandmother. Heaven played for the Spain U20 team in several trial matches, however later turned down an offer to participate with the Spain national team, stating: “...I decided to decline that offer because I wanted to focus on my development with Lyon.”

== Career ==
In 2019, Heaven signed with Lyon LOU Rugby in France Top 14 as part of their Academy programme. Having progressed through the Academy ranks, Heaven made two appearances for LOU in the Top 14 in 2020. While playing in France, (based on family heritage) he was selected in the Spanish U20s squad; however COVID meant the cancellation of that tournament.

He returned to Australia in 2022, playing for Eastern Suburbs. He was called into the Waratahs squad ahead of Round 2 of the 2024 Super Rugby Pacific season, making his debut in the match against the Crusaders.

On 3 April 2025, Heaven would move to England as he joins Exeter Chiefs in the Premiership Rugby competition from the 2025-26 season.

== Awards and honours ==
Eastern Suburbs

- Shute Shield: 2022
