= Epeli Momo =

Fijian rugby union player (born 1999)

- Born: 22 October 1999 (age 27) Fiji
- Height: 184 cm (6 ft 0 in)
- Weight: 72 kg (159 lb; 11 st 5 lb)

Rugby union career
- Position: Wing
- Current team: Drua
Senior career
Years	Team	Apps	(Points)
2020–2023	Montauban	19	(15)
2024–	Drua		
- Correct as of 19 November 2023
International career
Years	Team	Apps	(Points)
2019	Fiji U20	5	(5)
2019	Fiji Warriors	3	(10)
- Correct as of 19 November 2023

Epeli Momo (born 22 October 1999) is a Fijian rugby union player, who plays for the Drua. His preferred position is wing.

== Early career ==
Momo represented Fiji U20 in 2019. He represented the Fiji Warriors and Fiji Sevens in 2019 also.

== Professional career ==
Momo's appearances attracted the interest of Rugby Pro D2 side Montauban who signed him ahead of the 2020–21 season. After three seasons, and limited game time including being played out of position, he returned to Fiji. He signed for the Fijian Drua ahead of the 2024 Super Rugby Pacific season.
