= Maciu Nabolakasi =

Australian rugby union player

- Born: Fiji
- Height: 6”3
- Weight: 108 kg (238 lb)

Rugby union career
- Position: Flanker
- Current team: Rebels
Senior career
Years	Team	Apps	(Points)
2019	Melbourne Rising		
2024	Rebels	10	(10)
- Correct as of 8 June 2024

Maciu Nabolakasi is a Fijian professional rugby union player, who plays for the Rebels. His preferred position is flanker.

== Early career ==
Nabolakasi has been playing rugby in Victoria since 2016, representing Southern Districts, captain of Melbourne Unicorns and Footscray. He earned his selection for the Melbourne Rebels rising and then captain for Victorian Axemen and toured with the Rebels to Japan. From there he earned his debut and professional rugby career.

== Professional career ==
Nabolakasi was named in the Melbourne Rising squad for the 2019 National Rugby Championship. He was named in the Rebels squad ahead of Round 4 of the 2024 Super Rugby Pacific season, making his debut against the Reds.
