= Isaiah Armstrong-Ravula =

Fijian rugby union player (born 2004)

- Born: 7 January 2004 (age 22) Christchurch, New Zealand
- Height: 175 cm (5 ft 9 in)
- Weight: 86 kg (190 lb; 13 st 8 lb)
- Notable relative: Richie Mo'unga (uncle)

Rugby union career
- Position: Fly-half
- Current team: Drua, Manawatu
Senior career
Years	Team	Apps	(Points)
2023–	Manawatu	9	(24)
2024–	Drua	27	(181)
- Correct as of 3 June 2025
International career
Years	Team	Apps	(Points)
2023	Fiji U20	4	(42)
2024–	Fiji	2	(0)
- Correct as of 26 July 2024

Isaiah Armstrong-Ravula (born 7 January 2004) is a Fijian rugby union player, who plays for the Drua and Manawatu. His preferred position is fly-half.

== Early career ==
Armstrong-Ravula attended St Andrew's College, Christchurch. He plays his club rugby for College Old Boys. He was named in the Fiji U20 squad in 2023.

== Professional career ==
Armstrong-Ravula has represented Manawatu in the National Provincial Championship since 2023, being named in their full squad for the 2023 Bunnings NPC. He was named in the Drua squad for the 2024 Super Rugby Pacific season.
