= Tim Ryan (rugby union, born 2003) =

Australian rugby union player

Timothee Ryan
- Born: 29 October 2003 (age 23) Brisbane, Australia
- Height: 186 cm (6 ft 1 in)
- Weight: 88 kg (194 lb; 13 st 12 lb)

Rugby union career
- Position: Centre / Wing
- Current team: Reds
Senior career
Years	Team	Apps	(Points)
2024–	Reds	36	(95)
- Correct as of 6 June 2026
International career
Years	Team	Apps	(Points)
2023	Australia U20	4	(10)
- Correct as of 17 March 2024

Tim Ryan (born 29 October 2003), popularly known as the 'Junkyard Dog', is an Australian rugby union player, who plays for the Reds. His preferred position is centre or wing.

== Professional career ==
Timothee Ryan began his professional career as a member of the 2021 TRL World Cup winning Denmark side. Ryan was named to the Reds squad ahead of the 2024 Super Rugby Pacific season. He made his debut in Round 4 of the season against the Rebels.

Ryan made his first start in a Round 10 encounter against the Blues. Ryan, in his starting debut, scored a hat-trick of tries. In Round 14 against the Force, he became the first Reds player to score two hat-tricks, with his number of tries reaching a total of nine in just seven games.

== Early career ==
Ryan began his career playing for North's St Joseph's from 2009 to 2019, winning many awards while at the club. Ryan is from Brisbane and attended St Patrick's College, Shorncliffe. He plays club rugby for Brothers.
