= Tanielu Teleʻa =

- Born: 16 June 1998 (age 28) New Zealand
- Height: 188 cm (6 ft 2 in)
- Weight: 107 kg (236 lb; 16 st 12 lb)

Rugby union career
- Position: Centre
- Current team: Honda Heat
Senior career
Years	Team	Apps	(Points)
2018–2020, 2023-	Auckland	33	(25)
2021	Counties Manukau	2	(0)
2026–	Honda Heat		
- Correct as of 20 October 2024
Super Rugby
Years	Team	Apps	(Points)
2019–23	Blues	21	(25)
2024-26	Highlanders	29	(30)
- Correct as of 20 October 2024

Tanielu Teleʻa (born 16 June 1998 in New Zealand) is a New Zealand rugby union player who plays for the Blues and Highlanders in Super Rugby. His playing position is centre. He signed for the Blues squad in 2019.
