= William Havili =

Tonga international rugby union player

- Born: 9 September 1998 (age 28) Motueka, New Zealand
- Height: 1.87 m (6 ft 2 in)
- Weight: 84 kg (185 lb; 13 st 3 lb)
- School: Nelson College
- Notable relative: David Havili (brother)

Rugby union career
- Position(s): First five-eighth, Fullback
- Current team: Tasman, AZ-COM Maruwa MOMOTARO’S
Senior career
Years	Team	Apps	(Points)
2018, 2021–	Tasman	44	(304)
2022–2026	Moana Pasifika	61	(151)
2026–	AZ-COM Maruwa MOMOTARO’S		
- Correct as of 9 October 2026
International career
Years	Team	Apps	(Points)
2022–	Tonga	21	(103)
- Correct as of 9 October 2026

William L. Havili (born 9 September 1998) is a New Zealand born Tongan rugby union player who plays as a first five-eighth for Tasman in the Bunnings NPC.

== Club career ==
Havili made his debut for Tasman in Round 6 of the 2018 Mitre 10 Cup against Counties Manukau at Trafalgar Park, coming off the bench in a 21–19 win for the Mako. He was named in the Tasman Mako squad as a development player for the 2021 Bunnings NPC. He made his return to the side in Round 4 of the competition, coming off the bench against Waikato at Trafalgar Park. Havili signed with Moana Pasifika for the 2022 Super Rugby Pacific season. Tasman went on to make the final of the 2021 season before losing 23–20 to Waikato. He made his Super Rugby debut for Moana Pasifika against the Crusaders in Round 3 of the 2022 season.

Having become a regular starter for Moana Pasifika throughout 2022, He was called up to play test rugby for Tonga ahead of their World Cup qualifiers.

== Personal life ==
Havili was educated at Nelson College from 2014 to 2016. He was eligible for two nations, New Zealand through birth and Tonga through ancestry. He is also the brother of All Blacks player David Havili.
