= Jacob Ratumaitavuki-Kneepkens =

New Zealand rugby union player

- Full name: Jacob Wesley John Ratumaitavuki-Kneepkens
- Born: 3 August 2001 (age 25) Christchurch
- Height: 188 cm (6 ft 2 in)
- Weight: 89 kg (196 lb; 14 st 0 lb)
- School: Francis Douglas Memorial College

Rugby union career
- Position(s): Wing, Fullback
- Current team: Taranaki, Highlanders
Senior career
Years	Team	Apps	(Points)
2020–	Taranaki	54	(105)
2021–2023	Blues	13	(10)
2024-	Highlanders	31	(55)
- Correct as of 1 May 2026

Jacob Ratumaitavuki-Kneepkens (born 3 August 2001 in New Zealand) is a New Zealand rugby union player who plays for the Highlanders in Super Rugby. His regular playing position is wing. He was named in the Blues squad for the 2021 Super Rugby Aotearoa season. He was also a member of the Taranaki 2020 Mitre 10 Cup squad.
