= Cam Millar (rugby union) =

New Zealand rugby union player (born 2002)

- Full name: Cameron Millar
- Born: 13 July 2002 (age 24)
- Height: 185 cm (6 ft 1 in)
- Weight: 85 kg (187 lb; 13 st 5 lb)
- School: Gore High School; Otago Boys' High School

Rugby union career
- Position: First five-eighth
- Current team: Otago, Highlanders
Senior career
Years	Team	Apps	(Points)
2021–	Otago	35	(320)
2023–	Highlanders	21	(97)
- Correct as of 6 October 2025
International career
Years	Team	Apps	(Points)
2022	New Zealand U20	3	(20)
- Correct as of 6 October 2025

Cameron Millar (born 13 July 2002) is a New Zealand rugby union player who plays for the Highlanders in Super Rugby and Otago in the National Provincial Championship (NPC). His playing position is first five-eighth (fly-half).

== Early life ==
Millar attended Gore High School and Otago Boys' High School. Millar moved to Dunedin in 2019. He has played club rugby for Taieri RFC.

== Rugby career ==
Millar was signed by Otago for the 2021 Bunnings NPC season. He made his debut on 31 October in a non-competition match scoring 21 points in a 33–28 win against Wellington. On 5 November he made his NPC debut in a 27–25 loss away to Waikato.

In 2021 Millar played for the Highlanders under-20 team.
