= Raymond Tuputupu =

New Zealand rugby union player

- Born: 2003 (age 22–23) New Zealand
- Height: 183 cm (6 ft 0 in)
- Weight: 106 kg (234 lb)
- School: Palmerston North Boys' High School

Rugby union career
- Position: Hooker
- Current team: Hurricanes
Senior career
Years	Team	Apps	(Points)
2023–	Manawatu	22	(20)
2022–	Hurricanes	20	(15)
- Correct as of 1 May 2026

Raymond Tuputupu is a New Zealand rugby union player who plays for the Hurricanes in Super Rugby. His playing position is hooker. He was named in the Hurricanes squad for Round 3 of the 2022 Super Rugby Pacific season.
