= Hugh Sinclair (rugby union) =

- Born: Hugh Sinclair; 22 September 1992 (age 34) Sydney, New South Wales, Australia
- Height: 195 cm (6 ft 5 in)
- Weight: 113 kg (17 st 11 lb)
- School: Shore School

Rugby union career
- Position(s): Lock, Flanker, Number Eight
Senior career
Years	Team	Apps	(Points)
2015–2019	Sydney Rays	8	(0)
- Correct as of 6 November 2017
Super Rugby
Years	Team	Apps	(Points)
2017	Rebels	7	(0)
2019–2025	Waratahs	67	(10)
- Correct as of 31 May 2025

Hugh Sinclair (born 22 September 1992) is a retired Australian professional rugby union player who last played for the New South Wales Waratahs in the Super Rugby. His main position was number 8, and in later years was used at lock.

== Career ==
He made his debut for the Rebels against the Sharks as a replacement for Jake Schatz in a 9–9 draw for the Rebels. Sinclair moved to the Waratahs for the 2019 Super Rugby season.

Sinclair completed his Australian rugby career by Captaining the Waratahs against the British and Irish Lions in a brave 21–10 loss in Sydney.

== Super Rugby statistics ==
As of 5 May 2019

Season	Team	Games	Starts	Sub	Mins	Tries	Cons	Pens	Drops	Points	Yel	Red
2017	Rebels	7	3	4	298	0	0	0	0	0	0	0
2019	Waratahs	1	0	1	30	0	0	0	0	0	0	0
Total		8	3	5	328	0	0	0	0	0	0	0
