= Jay Fonokalafi =

Tonga international rugby union player

- Born: 9 December 1995 (age 30)

Rugby union career
- Position: Hooker / Prop
Super Rugby
Years	Team	Apps	(Points)
2024–	NSW Waratahs	7	(10)
International career
Years	Team	Apps	(Points)
2021–	Tonga	5	(10)

Jay Fonokalafi (born 9 December 1995) is a Tongan rugby union player.

== Rugby career ==
A forward, Fonokalafi plays mainly as a hooker or prop and played for North Harbour in the 2022 National Provincial Championship season. He moved to Sydney in 2023 and joined the Western Sydney Two Blues, from where he was called up by the NSW Waratahs, making his Super Rugby debut against the Blues in the 2024 season.

=== International ===
Fonokalafi competes in Test rugby for Tonga, scoring a try on debut in a World Cup qualifier against Samoa in Hamilton.

== See also ==
- List of Tonga national rugby union players
