= Samipeni Finau =

New Zealand rugby union player

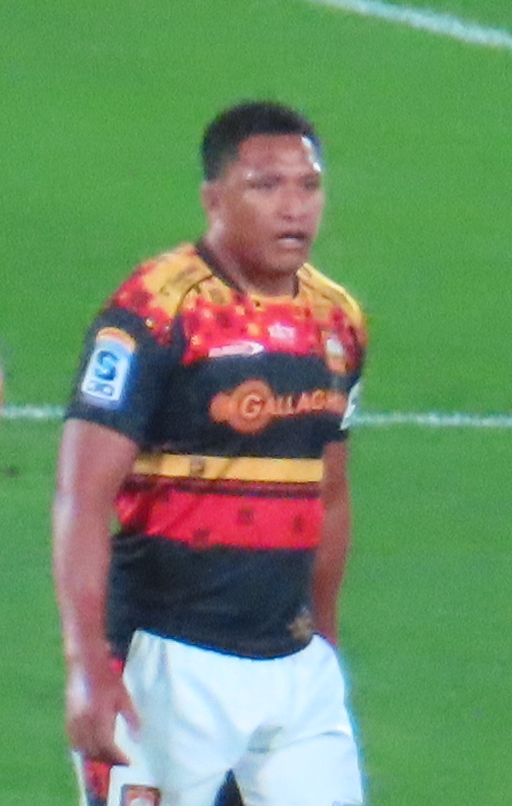
- Finau playing for the Chiefs in the 2026 Super Rugby Pacific final
- Born: 10 May 1999 (age 27) Tonga
- Height: 193 cm (6 ft 4 in)
- Weight: 115 kg (254 lb; 18 st 2 lb)
- School: St Peter's School, Cambridge

Rugby union career
- Position: Lock / Flanker
- Current team: Waikato, Canon Eagles
Senior career
Years	Team	Apps	(Points)
2019–	Waikato	35	(10)
2021–2026	Chiefs	45	(20)
2026–	Canon Eagles		
- Correct as of 5 November 2024
International career
Years	Team	Apps	(Points)
2019	New Zealand U20	6	(5)
2023–	New Zealand	12	(10)
- Correct as of 5 November 2024

Samipeni Finau (born 10 May 1999 in Tonga) is a Tongan born New Zealand rugby union player who plays as a Lock or Flanker for the Chiefs in Super Rugby and Waikato in the Bunnings NPC.

== International career ==
Finau made his senior test debut in a Bledisloe Cup test match on 5 August 2023 versus Australia, where he scored a try and helped the All Blacks win 23–20.
