= Tamati Tua =

- Born: 26 November 1997 (age 28) New Zealand
- Height: 191 cm (6 ft 3 in)
- Weight: 98 kg (15 st 6 lb; 216 lb)

Rugby union career
- Position(s): Centre, Wing
- Current team: Ricoh Black Rams
Senior career
Years	Team	Apps	(Points)
2016–2023	Northland	62	(40)
2024–2026	Exeter Chiefs	19	(10)
2026–	Ricoh Black Rams		
- Correct as of 30 September 2023
Super Rugby
Years	Team	Apps	(Points)
2018, 2022	Blues	4	(5)
2023–2024	Brumbies	29	(20)
- Correct as of 14 June 2024
International career
Years	Team	Apps	(Points)
2017	New Zealand U20	5	(10)
- Correct as of 23 August 2021

Tamati R. Tua (born 26 November 1997) is a New Zealand rugby union player. His position of choice is centre. He played 1 game for the Blues in 2018 and 2 in 2022

On 17 July 2024, Tua would move to England as he signs for Exeter Chiefs in the Gallagher Premiership from the 2024-25 season.
