= Carter Gordon =

Australia international rugby union & league player

- Full name: Carter Carl Gordon
- Born: 29 January 2001 (age 25) Nambour, Queensland, Australia
- Height: 1.89 m (6 ft 2 in)
- Weight: 93 kg (205 lb; 14 st 9 lb)
- School: Sunshine Coast Grammar School; Brisbane Boys' College
- Notable relative: Mason Gordon (brother)

Rugby union career
- Position: Fly-half
- Current team: Reds
Senior career
Years	Team	Apps	(Points)
2019	Queensland Country	1	(6)
2021–2024	Rebels	46	(156)
2026–	Reds	10	(45)
- Correct as of 6 June 2026
International career
Years	Team	Apps	(Points)
2018	Australia U18		
2023–	Australia	12	(34)
- Correct as of 30 August 2026
- Rugby league career

Playing information
- Position: Centre, Five-eighth
Club
Years	Team	Pld	T	G	FG	P
2025	Gold Coast Titans	1	0	0	0	0

Carter Carl Gordon (born 29 January 2001) is an Australian professional rugby union footballer who plays for the Queensland Reds in Super Rugby and for the Australian Wallabies. He formerly played for the Melbourne Rebels and also the Gold Coast Titans in the National Rugby League.

== 2019-2024 (Rugby Union) ==
He was signed for the Queensland Reds squad in 2020 but relocated to Melbourne in 2021 to join the Rebels. Since his move to the Rebels, Gordon has remained with the team and has since become the starting fly-half for the team, and re-signed for the team, in 2022, until the end of 2024.

Gordon was selected in the Australian squad for the 2023 Rugby World Cup.

== 2024-2025 (Rugby League) ==
On June 12, 2024, it was announced that Gordon had signed for NRL team, the Gold Coast Titans from the 2025 NRL season onwards. One month later Gordon played his first game of Rugby League for the Tweed Heads Seagulls in the Queensland Cup, scoring a try and one try assist. Unfortunately in the 2025 pre-season Gordon suffered a back injury at training, Gordon revealed that his injury was a CSF leak from his back that required full bed rest. He won his first match in the NRL 36-28 in round 27 of the 2025 NRL season over the Wests Tigers which meant the Gold Coast would avoid the Wooden Spoon. On 6 October 2025, it was reported that Gordon had been granted permission by the Gold Coast to negotiate with Rugby Union teams for an immediate switch back to the 15-man code. On 10 October, the Titans officially released Gordon from the remainder of his contract.

== 2025- present (Rugby Union) ==
On the 13th of October Gordon then signed with the Queensland Reds and Rugby Australia. Rushed back into the Australian team, Gordon started at 10 against Italy on November 9 and scored a try in a 26-19 defeat. Unfortunately he suffered quad and hip injuries and was unable to play another game on the spring tour.

== Statistics ==
As of 3 June 2023

Season	Team	Games	Starts	Sub	Mins	Tries	Cons	Pens	Drops	Points	Yel	Red
2020	Reds	0	0	0	0	0	0	0	0	0	0	0
2020 AU	Reds	0	0	0	0	0	0	0	0	0	0	0
2021 AU	Rebels	1	0	1	25	0	0	0	0	0	0	0
2021 TT	Rebels	5	4	1	338	0	3	0	0	6	0	0
2022	Rebels	13	7	6	718	1	1	0	0	7	0	0
2023	Rebels	13	13	0	1,034	7	6	0	0	47	0	0
Total		32	24	8	2,104	8	10	0	0	60	0	0
