= Taufa Funaki =

New Zealand rugby union player

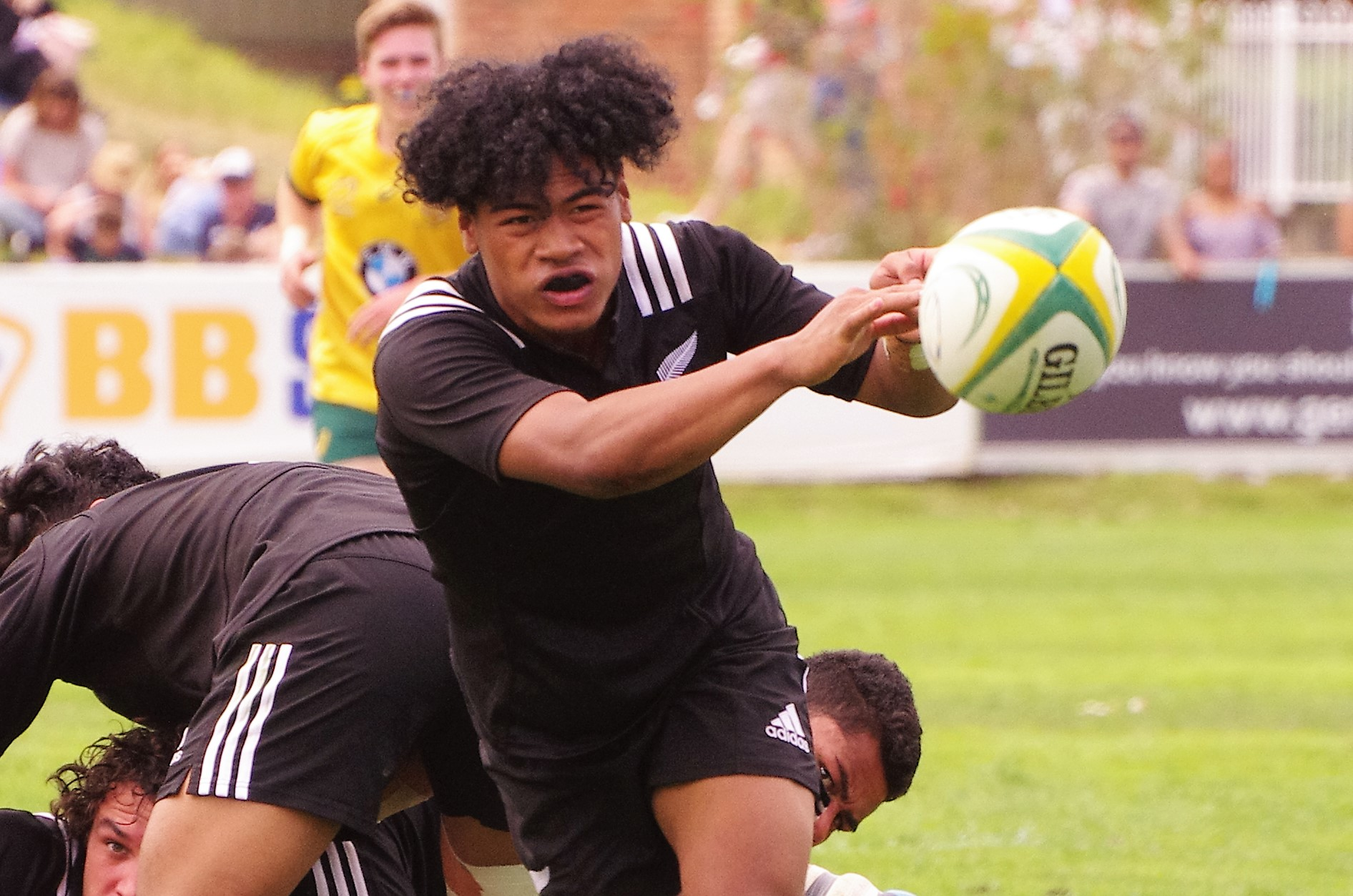
- Born: 29 July 2000 (age 26) New Zealand
- Height: 179 cm (5 ft 10 in)
- Weight: 87 kg (192 lb; 13 st 10 lb)
- School: Sacred Heart College

Rugby union career
- Position: Half-back
Senior career
Years	Team	Apps	(Points)
2020–	Auckland	33	(2)
2021–	Blues	33	(35)
- Correct as of 18 August 2025
International career
Years	Team	Apps	(Points)
2019	New Zealand U20	4	(0)
- Correct as of 25 August 2021

Taufa Funaki (born 29 July 2000 in New Zealand) is a New Zealand rugby union player who plays for Auckland in the National Provincial Championship. His playing position is Half-back.
