= Moana Pasifika =

Rugby union team from various Pacific island nations

- Union: New Zealand Rugby
- Founded: 2020
- Disbanded: 2026
- Ground: North Harbour Stadium (Capacity: 14,000)
- Most caps: William Havili (61)
- Top scorer: William Havili (151)
- Most tries: Miracle Faiʻilagi (18)
- League: Super Rugby Pacific
- 2026: 11th overall Playoffs: DNQ
Team kit

Moana Pasifika was a professional rugby union team based in New Zealand. The team, which was a participant in the Super Rugby Pacific competition between 2022 and 2026, was made up of players from various Pacific Island nations as well as New Zealand- or Australian-born players of Pasifika heritage. Many of its players represented Tonga and Samoa at the international level, and also included high-profile All Blacks players, such as captain Ardie Savea.

The team was originally created for a one-off match against the Māori All Blacks in December 2020, with the future intention of trying to join the Super Rugby competition. Moana Pasifika were granted a conditional licence and subsequently an unconditional licence in April and July 2021 respectively, to join the Super Rugby competition.

In April 2026, it was announced that the team would be disbanding at the conclusion of the 2026 Super Rugby Pacific season due to financial challenges. In late June 2026, NZ Rugby confirmed the dissolution of Moana Pasifika following a failed joint bid by the Samoan and Tongan governments to save the rugby franchise.

== History ==
On 24 November 2020, Moana Pasifika coach Tana Umaga named a 26-man squad for the match against the Māori All Blacks on 5 December 2020. The team was made up of New Zealand-based players who were international or sevens capped by a Pacific team or identified with a Pacific region. On 5 December 2020, the team played their first match, against the Māori All Blacks at Waikato Stadium. Captained by Sydney born Samoan international Michael Alaalatoa the side lost to the Māori 28–21.

=== Super Rugby ===
Following the conclusion of the 2020 Super Rugby season, the licences for the South African Super Rugby sides (the Bulls, the Lions, the Sharks and the Stormers), the Argentine Jaguares and the Japanese Sunwolves all expired. The 2021 Super Rugby season, still affected by the COVID-19 pandemic, was played in two regionalised tournaments featuring the five New Zealand Super Rugby sides and the four Australian Super Rugby sides, plus the Western Force who had returned to the tournament having lost their licence at the end of the 2017 Super Rugby season. However, from 2022 onwards a new 12-team tournament had been mooted, and on 13 November 2020, the New Zealand Rugby Union announced Moana Pasifika, along with the Fijian Drua as its preferred partners to join the competition. Further steps were made in March 2021, when the New Zealand Rugby Union agreed to a sharing of broadcast revenue with both Moana Pasifika and the Fijian Drua, and this was followed later in the same month by World Rugby announcing financial, high performance and administrative support for both potential new sides, in order to boost the performances of Pacific Islands at international level, while also being able to stay local instead of heading overseas.

On 14 April 2021, both sides were granted conditional licenses to join Super Rugby in 2022 by the New Zealand Rugby Union.

On 12 July 2021, the team were granted an unconditional licence, confirming them for the 2022 Super Rugby season.

On 30 August 2021, the side was confirmed in Super Rugby for the 2022 and 2023 seasons, beginning with the 2022 Super Rugby Pacific season.

In September it was announced that Moana Pasifika would be based in South Auckland, Auckland Region, and would play their fixtures at Mt Smart Stadium until 2028. Dynasty Sport was announced as the supplier for the team's on-field kit. Aaron Mauger was then announced as the first coach of the team on 30 September 2021.

On 15 November 2021, the schedule for the 2022 Super Rugby Pacific season was announced, with Moana Pasifika's inaugural match scheduled to be played against the Brumbies in Auckland.

On 2 February 2022, Sekope Kepu was named as the inaugural captain of the Moana Pasifika franchise.

Changes to the playing schedule due to COVID-19 protocols meant Moana Pasifika played its inaugural Super Rugby game on 4 March 2022, a 12–33 loss to the Crusaders. In that historic game, loose forward Solomone Funaki scored the franchise's first ever try. Three weeks later, Moana Pasifika won its first Super Rugby game against the Hurricanes at Mt Smart Stadium, winning 24–19.

On 9 November 2023, Tom Savage was named in the squad for the 2024 Super Rugby Pacific season. He's the only European to play and then captain the team.

On 21 July 2024, Moana Pasifika announced the signing of All Blacks forward Ardie Savea, which was considered by many to be the most significant player transfer in Super Rugby history.

=== Proposed dissolution ===
On 15 April 2026, Moana Pasifika announced that it would disband at the end of the 2025 Super Rugby Pacific season due to financial challenges, with the club needing between NZ$10 and $12 million to remain financially sustainable. Contributing to this decision was the team's struggle to find a home stadium after being forced to leave Mount Smart. They moved to North Harbour Stadium, but are limited to just 5 games a season at the venue. A recent attempt to play a home game in Tonga was unsuccessful due to lack of sponsorship. In response, New Zealand Rugby confirmed that other parties were exploring options for keeping the rugby club alive.

0n 24 June 2026, NZ Rugby confirmed the dissolution of Moana Pasifika following a failed joint bid by the Samoan and Tongan governments to save the rugby franchise. NZ Rugby provided temporary funding to Moana Pasifika so that it could complete its final campaign in 2026. Liquidators were appointed after Moana Pasifika's shareholders voted to fold the team. Due to the dissolution of Moana Pasifika, Super Rugby Pacific is expected to drop to 10 teams in 2027. While Foreign Minister Winston Peters expressed regret that he had not been allowed to lobby other countries including France and Japan for further funding to support NZ Rugby, Prime Minister Christopher Luxon ruled out the use of public funds to support what he described as a "failing rugby franchise."

== Franchise area and ownership ==
=== Franchise area ===
The Moana Pasifika team was established to represent all of the Pacific Islands and provide a high-level professional pathway for players primarily able to represent Samoa and Tonga, and their respective national representative sides, as well as other Pacific Island nations.

Although based in New Zealand, Moana Pasifika do not represent any New Zealand provincial unions as is the case with the other New Zealand based Super Rugby teams but instead recruit players from across the Pacific Region, including New Zealand and Australia. The team is primarily composed of players based in or with ancestral ties to the Pacific Islands; largely Samoan and Tongan players but also of other Pacific heritage, including but not limited to Fijian, Māori and Cook Islands Māori.

The team draws on players from various teams that participate in semi-professional or amateur competitions in Pacific Island countries such as the Datec Cup Provincial Championship, Samoa National Provincial Championship and the Skipper Cup, or represents one of its served nations national rugby union side or sevens side. Many of the players who represent Moana Pasifika also play their rugby in New Zealand or Australia in competitions such as the National Provincial Championship, Heartland Championship, Queensland Premier Rugby or Shute Shield.

=== Ownership ===
Although New Zealand Rugby (NZR) granted Moana Pasifika the licence for them to join the Super Rugby Pacific competition, the club is not owned or operated by, and is not directly affiliated with New Zealand Rugby, as is the case with the other New Zealand-based teams. The club was established and wholly owned by a charitable trust, the Moana Pasifika Charitable Trust. In 2021, World Rugby approved a funding package for a period of three years to support the establishment and operation of both the Fijian Drua and Moana Pasifika, worth £1.2m annually, shared between the two teams. The two new teams were also to be supported by their respective national unions and private equity funding. Sport New Zealand provided significant funding for Moana Pasifika in order to underwrite the franchise and cover additional operating costs for a period of four years.

In 2024, majority ownership of the club was sold to the Pasifika Medical Association (PMA) Group, which previously held a minority stake in the club. The deal included sponsorship and a partnership that would provide infrastructure and support around communications, events management, and a facility for the team's training and events.

=== Grounds ===
While ideally basing the team in a Pacific Island nation (i.e. Samoa or Tonga), the proposal put forward for the formation of the franchise outlined that basing the team in New Zealand during at least its formative years would be a more logistically feasible and viable option.

Moana Pasifika announced in September 2021 that they had signed an agreement to base their operations and play their home games at Mount Smart Stadium for the duration of the 2022–2028 seasons. After the first two rounds of Moana Pasifika's debut season were postponed due to a COVID-19 outbreak within the team, and after having to play what should have been their debut Super Rugby home match in Dunedin, they eventually hosted their first home game at Mount Smart Stadium in Round 5 of the 2022 competition, against the Chiefs.

Round 8 of the 2023 season saw a historic game against the Reds hosted at Apia Park, Apia – the second ever Super Rugby game to be played in Samoa after the Blues hosted the Reds at the same stadium in 2017.

The 2024 Round 3 game against the Rebels was relocated to Waikato Stadium due to turf issues at the original venue, while the team's solitary match against the Blues in Round 6 was played at Eden Park and treated as a home game for both teams, both being based in the Auckland area. Additionally, the Round 8 fixture versus the Reds was played at Semenoff Stadium, Whangārei. Moana Pasifika hosted the first Super Rugby game to be played in Tonga in Round 11, taking on the Highlanders at Teufaiva Stadium, Nuku'alofa.

In September 2024, it was announced that Moana Pasifika would make North Harbour Stadium its full-time home, with home games to be hosted at the venue from 2025, cutting short its tenure at Mount Smart Stadium.

In 2025 Moana Pasifika's Round 6 clash against the Chiefs, originally scheduled to be played in Nuku'alofa, was relocated to Navigation Homes Stadium in Pukekohe, owing to "a number of logistical challenges" and health concerns in hosting the match in Tonga at the time. The Round 10 match against the Brumbies was also played at the venue, as originally scheduled.

| Albany | Penrose | Apia | Nuku'alofa | Pukekohe |
|---|---|---|---|---|
| North Harbour Stadium | Mount Smart Stadium | Apia Park | Teufaiva Stadium | Navigation Homes Stadium |
| Capacity: 14,000 | Capacity: 25,000 | Capacity: 12,000 | Capacity: 10,000 | Capacity: 12,000 |

== Development team ==
Moana Pasifika have fielded an U20 development team in Super Rugby U20 since 2023 and also competed in the inaugural edition of the Oceania Rugby Under 20s Challenge in 2024. As with the senior Super Rugby side, the squad is selected from across the Pacific Region, including New Zealand, and is composed of the best emerging age-grade rugby talent either based in or with ancestral ties to the Pacific Islands – players of Samoan, Tongan, Fijian, Māori, Cook Islands Māori, Nieuan, Ni-Vanuatu and Tokelauan heritage have featured to date.

== Honours ==
=== Oceania Rugby U20s Challenge (2024) ===
- Third (1)

2024

== Records and achievements ==
=== Season standings ===
A season-by-season summary of Moana Pasifika's regular season results is shown below:

Super Rugby Pacific

| Season | Pos | Pld | W | D | L | F | A | +/- | BP | Pts | Notes |
|---|---|---|---|---|---|---|---|---|---|---|---|
| 2022 | 12th | 14 | 2 | 0 | 12 | 267 | 514 | −247 | 2 | 10 | |
| 2023 | 12th | 14 | 1 | 0 | 13 | 354 | 610 | −256 | 4 | 8 | |
| 2024 | 11th | 14 | 4 | 0 | 10 | 265 | 485 | −220 | 2 | 18 | |
| 2025 | 7th | 14 | 6 | 0 | 8 | 405 | 544 | −139 | 4 | 28 | |

=== Results per opposition ===
Moana Pasifika Super Rugby results vs different opponents

Super Rugby
| Opposition | Span | Played | Won | Drawn | Lost | Win% |
|---|---|---|---|---|---|---|
| (New Zealand) Blues | 2022–2025 | 6 | 1 | 0 | 5 | 16.7% |
| (New Zealand) Chiefs | 2022–2025 | 7 | 0 | 0 | 7 | 0.0% |
| (New Zealand) Crusaders | 2022–2025 | 5 | 1 | 0 | 4 | 20.0% |
| (New Zealand) Highlanders | 2022–2025 | 6 | 1 | 0 | 5 | 16.7% |
| (New Zealand) Hurricanes | 2022–2025 | 7 | 2 | 0 | 5 | 28.6% |
| (Australia) Brumbies | 2022–2025 | 4 | 1 | 0 | 3 | 25.0% |
| (Australia) Force | 2022–2025 | 4 | 1 | 0 | 3 | 25.0% |
| (Australia) Rebels | 2022–2024 | 3 | 0 | 0 | 3 | 0.0% |
| (Australia) Reds | 2022–2025 | 4 | 1 | 0 | 3 | 25.0% |
| (Australia) Waratahs | 2022–2025 | 4 | 3 | 0 | 1 | 75.0% |
| (Fiji) Fijian Drua | 2022–2025 | 6 | 2 | 0 | 4 | 33.3% |
| Overall | 2022–2025 | 56 | 13 | 0 | 43 | 23.2% |
Updated to: 1 June 2025

== Players ==
=== 2020 squad ===
2020 Moana Pasifika squad for match vs. Māori All Blacks
| **Props**: **Michael Alaalatoa** (c); **Jordan Lay**; Daniel Lienert-Brown; Sione Mafileo; **Hookers**: Leni Apisai; Samisoni Taukei'aho; **Locks**: Naitoa Ah Kuoi; Gerard Cowley-Tuioti; Samipeni Finau; **Zane Kapeli** | **Loose forwards**: **Nasi Manu**; Marino Mikaele-Tu'u; **Alamanda Motuga**; Pita Gus Sowakula; **Scrum-halves**: Folau Fakatava; **Dwayne Polataivao**; **Fly-halves**: **Josh Ioane**; Stephen Perofeta | **Centres**: Vince Aso; Leicester Fainga'anuku; **Fetuli Paea**; **Wingers**: Tomasi Alosio; Jone Macilai-Tori; Salesi Rayasi; **Asaeli Tikoirotuma**; **Fullbacks**: Etene Nanai-Seturo; (c) Denotes team captain, **Bold** denotes player is internationally capped. |

=== Captains ===
- (Australia) Sekope Kepu (2022–2023)
- (Samoa) James Lay (2024)
- (New Zealand) Ardie Savea (2025)
- (Samoa) Miracle Fai'ilagi (2026)

== Coaching staff ==
=== Former coaches ===
Moana Pasifika coaches by date, matches and win percentage*
| Coach | Period | G | W | D | L | % |
|---|---|---|---|---|---|---|
| Aaron Mauger | 2022–2023 | 28 | 3 | 0 | 25 | 10.71 |
| Tana Umaga | 2024–2026 | 42 | 12 | 0 | 30 | 28.57 |
| Totals (2022–present)^{*} | | **70** | **15** | **0** | **55** | **21.43** |
Updated to: **31 May 2026**

Notes:

^* Official Super Rugby competition matches only, including finals.

== See also ==
- Pacific Islanders rugby union team
- Pasifika (disambiguation)
