= 2025 Super Rugby Pacific final =

Men's rugby union club competition

- Event: 2025 Super Rugby Pacific season
Crusaders	Chiefs
16	12
- Match details
- Date: 21 June 2025
- Venue: Apollo Projects Stadium, Christchurch
- Man of the Match: Rivez Reihana (Crusaders)
- Referee: Angus Gardner (Australia)
- Attendance: 17,000
- Weather: Clear night 3 °C (37 °F); 88% humidity

The 2025 Super Rugby Pacific final, stylised as the 2025 Super Rugby Pacific Grand Final, was the final match of the 2025 Super Rugby Pacific season and the decider of the Finals Series, the 30th season of the Southern Hemisphere's premier rugby union competition organised by SANZAAR. The 30th Super Rugby final, and the eighth all-New Zealand final, it was played on 21 June 2025 at Apollo Projects Stadium, Christchurch.

It was scheduled to be one of the last rugby union fixtures played at Apollo Projects Stadium, Christchurch. From 2026, the Crusaders' new home venue is expected to be One New Zealand Stadium. However, it was in continual use until Round 8 of the 2026 Super Rugby season.

The Crusaders won the match 16–12, achieving their 13th Super Rugby title.

== Background ==
The Crusaders reached their seventeenth final since the inception of the Super Rugby competition in 1996, the most in the competition's history. It was their first final since 2023, when they defeated the Chiefs 20–25 in Hamilton, and their sixth final appearance in eight years (excluding Super Rugby Aotearoa). Going into the match, the Crusaders won six of their last seven matches against New Zealand teams, with the only defeat being to the Chiefs in round thirteen of the season. This was the first Super Rugby final (as head coach) for local Cantabrian and former Canterbury player Rob Penney.

Pre-match teams' record
Team	Wins	W%
Crusaders	29	56.86
Chiefs	22	43.14
Total	51	

The Chiefs reached their sixth Super Rugby final, with 2025 being their third consecutive final appearance. The last two finals were unsuccessful, losing 20–25 to the Crusaders in 2023 and 41–10 to the Blues in 2024. In three of their five total final appearances the Chiefs were the highest-placed team on the season standings at the conclusion of the regular season. The Chiefs and Crusaders previously met in the 2023 final. Despite finishing top of the regular season ladder during 2023, the 20–25 home loss to the Crusaders was just their second defeat of the season. This was the third consecutive Super Rugby final for coach Clayton McMillan, having been at the helm since 2021. It was also reported earlier in the season that McMillan had signed to coach Irish club Munster following the end of the Super Rugby season, making it his final match as coach of the Chiefs. Leading into the final, the Chiefs won five of their last seven matches against the Crusaders, including their last two in a row; the only time in which they've won more consecutive matches against the Crusaders was a four-match streak between 2015 and 2016.

=== Venue ===
The venue for the final was Apollo Projects Stadium, Christchurch. Due to the new Finals Series format laid out at the beginning of the season, the second-placed Crusaders were given the right to host the final despite the Chiefs finishing above them in first place at the end of the regular season. During the Finals Series each victorious team, along with the highest-seeded team that suffered a defeat in the qualifying finals, progressed to the semi-final stage. At this juncture, teams were re-seeded according to their regular season standings. Notably, the highest-seeded team that did not secure victory in the qualifying finals incurred a penalty of one seeding rank; for example, the Chiefs as the first-placed team, lost their qualifying final fixture against New Zealand rivals the Blues (sixth place), thus they were re-seeded to the second position for the semi-final round. Subsequently, the winners of the semi-final contests—pitting the first-seeded team (Crusaders) against the fourth (Blues), and the second (Chiefs) against the third (Brumbies)—advanced to the final, with the highest-seeded of the two emerging teams earning the honour of hosting the final match.

=== Cowbell ban ===
On the week ahead of the final, Crusaders Chief Executive Colin Mansbridge stated that cowbells, known as an iconic instrument and symbol of the Chiefs and their provincial rugby team Waikato, would be banned from their stadium for the final. The Waikato Times reported that the "cowbell is practically sacred for Chiefs fans, rooted in Waikato's farming heritage and tied to the region's beloved mascot, Mooloo the cow. When the Chiefs joined Super Rugby, the tradition naturally followed." Mansbridge, citing safety concerns, explained the decision on LinkedIn: "It's tight [the stadium]. It's compact and there's just enough room to wave a really thin flag... There ain't no room to swing a bloody big cowbell and take out the person sitting in the seat beside you." He later added, "We think it's probably safest not to have them here." Mansbridge also claimed that he received threats from fans for the decision to ban cowbells from the stadium. Mayor of Hamilton Paula Southgate declared to 1News, "The Chiefs cowbell is in their DNA, and we've been shaking this thing forever... I can understand if the Crusaders are a bit rattled, but not having our cowbells will not stop Chiefs fans from bringing the volume, and the Chiefs bringing the victory home." The same week, Chiefs CEO Simon Graafhuis announced the launch of a virtual cowbell (cowbell.co.nz) for fans to play at the stadium on their phone, and mentioned: "It's for those fans who simply can't go without the sound of a cowbell".

Similarly, in 2015 and 2016, a number of Chiefs supporters had their iconic cowbells confiscated at Sky Stadium, Wellington, the home ground of their North Island rivals, the Hurricanes, after stadium officials classified the bells as musical instruments. The stadium enforced a long-standing policy prohibiting all musical instruments, and despite the cultural significance of cowbells to Chiefs fans, security upheld the rule, sparking frustration among travelling supporters.

=== Previous finals ===
Team	Previous final appearances (bold indicates winners)
Crusaders	16 (**1998**, **1999**, **2000**, **2002**, 2003, 2004, **2005**, **2006**, **2008**, 2011, 2014, **2017**, **2018**, **2019**, **2022**, **2023**)
Chiefs	5 (2009, **2012**, **2013**, 2023, 2024)

== Route to the final ==
Note: In all results below, the score of the finalist is given first (H: home; A: away).

Crusaders		Round	Chiefs	
Competition
Pos / Team / Pld / W / D / L / PF / PA / PD / TF / TA / TB / LB / Pts; 1 / Chiefs / 14 / 11 / 0 / 3 / 550 / 319 / +231 / 75 / 45 / 5 / 2 / 51; 2 / Crusaders / 14 / 11 / 0 / 3 / 471 / 371 / +100 / 70 / 51 / 5 / 0 / 49; 3 / Brumbies / 14 / 9 / 0 / 5 / 448 / 361 / +87 / 66 / 50 / 4 / 4 / 44; 4 / Hurricanes / 14 / 8 / 1 / 5 / 448 / 342 / +106 / 63 / 46 / 2 / 3 / 39; 5 / Reds / 14 / 8 / 0 / 6 / 425 / 371 / +54 / 63 / 52 / 4 / 2 / 38; 6 / Blues / 14 / 6 / 0 / 8 / 377 / 330 / +47 / 55 / 41 / 5 / 4 / 33
Opponent	Result	Finals	Opponent	Result
Reds (H)	32–12	Qualifying finals	Blues (H)	19–20
Blues (H)	21–14	Semi-finals	Brumbies (H)	37–17

== Match ==
The Chiefs faced significant challenges for extended durations due to the Crusaders' suffocating defence. Although they managed to disrupt the Crusaders' lineout, they experienced pressure during scrums and were unable to generate the necessary space for their backs in the second half. Crusaders captain David Havili received a yellow card in the 12th minute following a head collision with Chiefs winger Emoni Narawa. As a result of the penalty, the Chiefs kicked to the corner, secured the lineout, and midfielder Quinn Tupaea made two powerful carries before prop George Dyer scored beneath the posts. In the 26th minute, Crusaders hooker Codie Taylor broke free from a collapsing maul and sprinted over 20-metres down the narrow left sideline to score. No. 10 Rivez Reihana followed-up with a conversion, equalising the score at 7–7. The Crusaders took the lead for the first time in the game in the 28th minute via a penalty goal from Reihana. Another penalty increased the score to 13–7. Just before half-time, the Chiefs responded with a try from Shaun Stevenson, who scored in the right corner after 16 phases. The physicality intensified during the second half, with Chiefs No. 10 Damian McKenzie receiving notable focus from the Crusaders. The diminutive fly-half failed to convert a long-range penalty goal that could have given the Chiefs the lead in the 55th minute. Another penalty goal in the 73rd minute from Rivez Reihana put the Crusaders further ahead of the Chiefs, and ultimately sealed the win 16–12.

21 June 2025
19:05 NZST (UTC+12)

Crusaders	16–12	Chiefs
Try: Codie Taylor 26'; Con: Rivez Reihana (1/1) 27'; Pen: Rivez Reihana (3/4) 29', 35', 73'	Report	Try: George Dyer 13'; Shaun Stevenson 38'; Con: Damian McKenzie (1/2) 14'; Pen: Damian McKenzie (0/1)

Apollo Projects Stadium, Christchurch
Attendance: 17,000
Referee: Angus Gardner (Australia)

Crusaders	Chiefs

FB	15	Will Jordan
RW	14	Sevu Reece
OC	13	Braydon Ennor				(substituted off) 71'
IC	12	David Havili (c)	(yellow card) 12' to 22'	(substituted off) 22'	(substituted on) 25'
LW	11	Macca Springer
FH	10	Rivez Reihana		(substituted off) 80'
SH	9	Noah Hotham		(substituted off) 73'
N8	8	Christian Lio-Willie
OF	7	Tom Christie		(substituted off) 55'
BF	6	Ethan Blackadder
RL	5	Antonio Shalfoon		(substituted off) 64'
LL	4	Scott Barrett
TP	3	Fletcher Newell
HK	2	Codie Taylor		(substituted off) 64'
LP	1	Tamaiti Williams		(substituted off) 55'
Substitutes:
HK	16	George Bell		(substituted on) 64'
PR	17	George Bower		(substituted on) 55'
PR	18	Seb Calder
LK	19	Jamie Hannah		(substituted on) 64'
LF	20	Cullen Grace		(substituted on) 55'
SH	21	Kyle Preston		(substituted on) 73'
FH	22	James O'Connor		(substituted on) 80'
CE	23	Dallas McLeod		(substituted on) 22'	(substituted off) 25'	(substituted on) 71'
Coach:
Rob Penney

FB	15	Shaun Stevenson	(substituted off) 69'
RW	14	Emoni Narawa	(substituted off) 64'
OC	13	Daniel Rona
IC	12	Quinn Tupaea
LW	11	Leroy Carter
FH	10	Damian McKenzie
SH	9	Cortez Ratima	(substituted off) 61'
N8	8	Wallace Sititi			(substituted off) 70'
OF	7	Luke Jacobson (c)	(substituted off) 44'	(substituted on) 56'
BF	6	Samipeni Finau
RL	5	Tupou Vaa'i
LL	4	Naitoa Ah Kuoi	(substituted off) 65'
TP	3	George Dyer	(substituted off) 51'
HK	2	Samisoni Taukei'aho	(substituted off) 51'
LP	1	Ollie Norris	(substituted off) 51'
Substitutes:
HK	16	Brodie McAlister	(substituted on) 51'
PR	17	Aidan Ross	(substituted on) 51'
PR	18	Reuben O'Neill	(substituted on) 51'
LK	19	Jimmy Tupou	(substituted on) 65'
LF	20	Kaylum Boshier	(substituted on) 44'	(substituted off) 56'	(substituted on) 70'
SH	21	Xavier Roe	(substituted on) 61'
CE	22	Josh Jacomb	(substituted on) 69'
FB	23	Etene Nanai-Seturo	(substituted on) 64'
Coach:
Clayton McMillan

Man of the Match:
Rivez Reihana (Crusaders)
Assistant referees:
Damon Murphy (Australia)
Matt Kellahan (Australia)
Television match official:
Brett Cronan (Australia)

=== Statistics ===
Overall
Statistic	Crusaders	Chiefs
Tries scored	1	2
Possession	57%	43%
Territory	57%	43%
Kicks	40	33
Carries	146	115
Metres carried	663	505
Tackles	137	203
Tackles missed	10	13
Tackle success	93%	94%
Offloads	2	5
Penalties conceded	7	8
Own lineouts won	14/17	10/12
Scrums won	8	4

== Broadcasting ==
In the principal constituent countries of the Super Rugby Pacific (Australia, Fiji, New Zealand), the 2025 season saw an increase in television viewership and engagement from the previous year. Australia reported having a 17% rise in viewership after the first three rounds on Nine Network's broadcasts, and a 30% increase after eight rounds. Fiji's Walesi App saw a peak viewership of 395,436 in the fourth round, more than a third of the Fijian population.

The final was the most-watched match of the season, and drew a combined cumulative audience of 726,000 on New Zealand's pay TV platform Sky Sport 1 and the free-to-air platform Sky Open, almost 100,000 more viewers than the 2024 final. These figures made it the most-viewed Super Rugby final in New Zealand since 2016, which featured the Hurricanes of Wellington win their maiden title against the Lions of Johannesburg at Wellington Regional Stadium.

== See also ==
- 2025 United Rugby Championship Grand Final
