= 2023 Super Rugby Pacific final =

Men's rugby union club competition

- Event: 2023 Super Rugby Pacific season
Chiefs	Crusaders
(New Zealand)	(New Zealand)
20	25
- Date: 24 June 2023
- Venue: Waikato Stadium, Hamilton
- Man of the Match: Sam Whitelock (Crusaders)
- Referee: Ben O'Keeffe (New Zealand)
- Attendance: 25,000

The 2023 Super Rugby Pacific final was a rugby union match contested between the Chiefs and the Crusaders at Waikato Stadium on 24 June 2023. It was the 28th Super Rugby final, staged to determine the premiers of the 2023 season. The match, attended by 25,000 spectators, was won by the Crusaders by a margin of five points, marking the franchise's twelfth Super Rugby title. Sam Whitelock was named "Man of the Match" in his 181st and final match for the Crusaders.

== Background ==
The Chiefs and the Crusaders finished first and second, respectively. It was the teams' first encounter in a Super Rugby final.

Both finalists had won a Super Rugby title, with the Crusaders being the two-time, back-to-back defending champions and holding the most title victories in the Super Rugby (11), with the Chiefs' last Super Rugby title being in 2013. The head-to-head results overall in the Super Rugby before their encounter was 27–19, with the Crusaders holding an eight victory lead. Six of their last ten matches went the way of the Crusaders, and, in 2023, the Chiefs won both fixtures against the Crusaders. The odds for the final were equal, with both teams not being considered favourite.

The match was a tactical struggle between the Chiefs' backline and the Crusaders' set-piece efficiency. Despite the Chiefs scoring two clinical tries through Shaun Stevenson and Emoni Narawa, the Crusaders remained within reach through the goal-kicking of Richie Mo'unga. The turning point occurred in the final ten minutes when, with Sam Cane in the sin bin, the Crusaders opted for a lineout drive that resulted in Codie Taylor's second try of the night, sealing the 25–20 victory.

== Road to the final ==
2023 Super Rugby Pacific standings (showing top eight)
Pos	Team	Pld	W	D	L	PF	PA	PD	TF	TA	TB	LB	Pts	Qualification
1	Chiefs	14	13	0	1	487	261	+226	65	38	6	1	59	Quarter-finals
2	Crusaders	14	10	0	4	457	278	+179	65	36	6	2	48	Quarter-finals
3	Blues	14	10	0	4	446	292	+154	60	39	3	3	46	Quarter-finals
4	Brumbies	14	10	0	4	474	393	+81	66	52	5	1	46	Quarter-finals
5	Hurricanes	14	9	0	5	480	338	+142	70	47	3	2	41	Quarter-finals
6	Waratahs	14	6	0	8	387	408	−21	54	53	4	3	31	Quarter-finals
7	Drua	14	6	0	8	370	492	−122	54	73	1	1	26	Quarter-finals
8	Reds	14	5	0	9	391	451	−60	54	61	1	3	24	Quarter-finals

Source: Super Rugby

=== Play-offs ===
Quarter-finals
10 June – Hamilton
(New Zealand) Chiefs	29
(Australia) Reds	20
10 June – Christchurch
(New Zealand) Crusaders	49
(Fiji) Drua	8

Semi-finals
17 June – Hamilton
(New Zealand) Chiefs	19
(Australia) Brumbies	9
16 June – Christchurch
(New Zealand) Blues	15
(New Zealand) Crusaders	52

== Final ==
24 June 2023
17:05 NZST (UTC+12)

Chiefs	20–25	Crusaders
Try: Shaun Stevenson 23'; Emoni Narawa 43'; Con: Damian McKenzie (2/2) 24', 44'; Pen: Damian McKenzie (2/4) 20', 49'	Report	Try: Codie Taylor (2) 28', 73'; Richie Mo'unga 36'; Con: Richie Mo'unga (2/3) 37', 74'; Pen: Richie Mo'unga (2/2) 9', 80+1'; Chay Fihaki (0/1)

Waikato Stadium, Hamilton
Attendance: 25,000
Referee: Ben O'Keeffe (New Zealand)

Chiefs	Crusaders

FB	15	Shaun Stevenson
RW	14	Emoni Narawa (Note: Narawa was born in Fiji. He did not represent New Zealand until after the 2023 season had already concluded.)
OC	13	Alex Nankivell		(substituted off) 77'
IC	12	Anton Lienert-Brown	(yellow card) 9'
LW	11	Etene Nanai-Seturo		(substituted off) 60'
FH	10	Damian McKenzie
SH	9	Brad Weber (cc)		(substituted off) 60'
N8	8	Luke Jacobson	(yellow card) 26'
OF	7	Sam Cane (cc)	(yellow card) 72'
BF	6	Pita Gus Sowakula		(substituted off) 50'
LL	5	Tupou Vaa'i		(substituted off) 60'
RL	4	Brodie Retallick
TP	3	George Dyer		(substituted off) 60'
HK	2	Samisoni Taukei'aho		(substituted off) 69'
LP	1	Aidan Ross		(substituted off) 50'
Substitutes:
HK	16	Tyrone Thompson		(substituted on) 69'
PR	17	Ollie Norris		(substituted on) 50'
PR	18	John Ryan		(substituted on) 60'
LK	19	Naitoa Ah Kuoi		(substituted on) 60'
FL	20	Samipeni Finau		(substituted on) 50'
WG	21	Cortez Ratima		(substituted on) 60'
SH	22	Josh Ioane		(substituted on) 60'
CE	23	Rameka Poihipi		(substituted on) 77'
Coach:
Clayton McMillan

FB	15	Will Jordan
RW	14	Dallas McLeod	(substituted off) 13'
CE	13	Braydon Ennor
SF	12	Jack Goodhue
LW	11	Leicester Fainga'anuku
FH	10	Richie Mo'unga
SH	9	Mitchell Drummond	(substituted off) 50'
N8	8	Christian Lio-Willie
OF	7	Tom Christie
BF	6	Sione Havili Talitui	(substituted off) 57'
LL	5	Sam Whitelock
RL	4	Scott Barrett (c)
TP	3	Oli Jager	(substituted off) 77'
HK	2	Codie Taylor
LP	1	Tamaiti Williams	(substituted off) 69'
Substitutes:
HK	16	George Bell
PR	17	Kershawl Sykes-Martin	(substituted on) 69'
PR	18	Reuben O'Neill	(substituted on) 77'
LK	19	Quinten Strange
FL	20	Dominic Gardiner	(substituted on) 57'
SH	21	Willi Heinz	(substituted on) 50'
WG	22	Fergus Burke	(substituted on) 74'
WG	23	Chay Fihaki	(substituted on) 13' (substituted off) 74'
Coach:
Scott Robertson

Man of the Match:
Sam Whitelock (Crusaders)

Assistant Referees:
Nic Berry (Australia)
Angus Gardner (Australia)
Television match official:
Brendon Pickerill (New Zealand)

== Notes ==
Preceded by 2022	Super Rugby Pacific Final; 2023	Succeeded by 2024
