= List of Super Rugby champions =

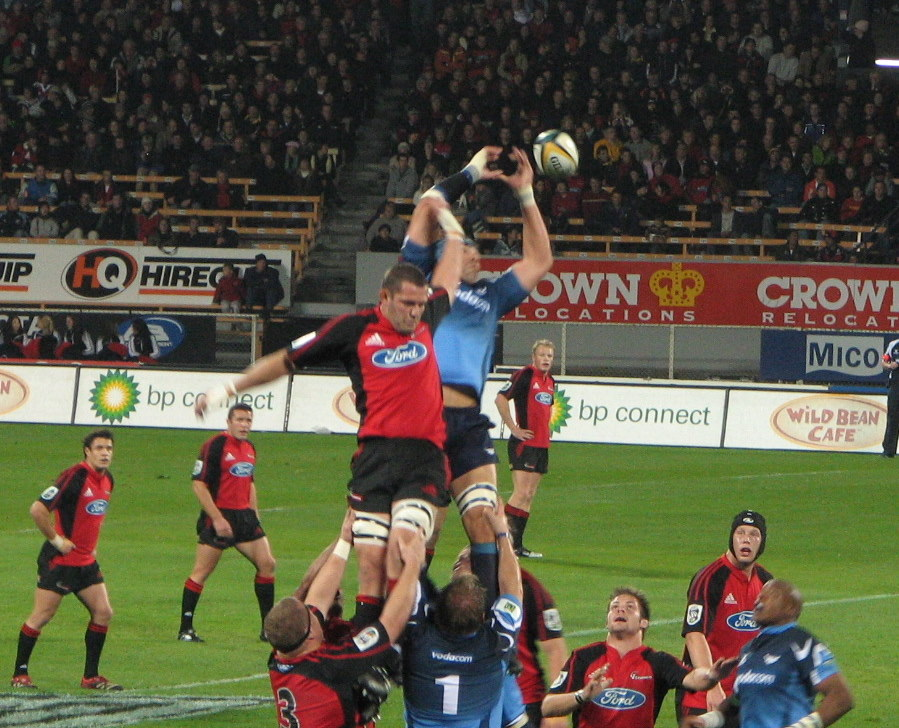
Thirteen-time champion Crusaders (red) and three-time champion Bulls competing for a line-out

Super Rugby is the major professional rugby union competition in the Southern Hemisphere. The competition began as Super 12 in 1996, consisting of 12 teams from Australia, South Africa and New Zealand. An extra Australian and South African team were added in 2005 and the name was changed to Super 14. A fifteenth team joined in 2011 and the competition was rebranded as Super Rugby. The current format consists of three conferences of five teams from each country. Teams play other members of their conference twice (home and away) and four teams from each of the other two conferences once. The top team in each conference and the next best three over all conferences advance to the finals. In all previous formats there were no conferences and each team played every team once, with the top four progressing to the finals. The tournament is organised and governed by SANZAAR (South Africa, New Zealand, Australia and Argentine Rugby). Super Rugby is considered a successor to the Super Six (1992) and Super 10 (1993–1995), although SANZAR did not administer those tournaments.

== Champions ==
Year	No. of Teams	Final			Losing semi-finalists	
Year	No. of Teams	Winners	Score	Runners-up	1st losing semi-finalists	2nd losing semi-finalists
1996	12	(New Zealand) Auckland Blues	45–21	(South Africa) Natal Sharks	(Australia) Queensland Reds	(South Africa) Northern Transvaal
1997	12	(New Zealand) Auckland Blues	23–7	(Australia) ACT Brumbies	(New Zealand) Wellington Hurricanes	(South Africa) Sharks
1998	12	(New Zealand) Canterbury Crusaders	20–13	(New Zealand) Auckland Blues	(South Africa) Sharks	(New Zealand) Otago Highlanders
1999	12	(New Zealand) Canterbury Crusaders	24–19	(New Zealand) Otago Highlanders	(Australia) Queensland Reds	(South Africa) Stormers
2000	12	(New Zealand) Crusaders	20–19	(Australia) Brumbies	(New Zealand) Highlanders	(South Africa) Cats
2001	12	(Australia) Brumbies	36–6	(South Africa) Sharks	(South Africa) Cats	(Australia) Reds
2002	12	(New Zealand) Crusaders	31–13	(Australia) Brumbies	(Australia) Waratahs	(New Zealand) Highlanders
2003	12	(New Zealand) Blues	21–17	(New Zealand) Crusaders	(New Zealand) Hurricanes	(Australia) Brumbies
2004	12	(Australia) Brumbies	47–38	(New Zealand) Crusaders	(South Africa) Stormers	(New Zealand) Chiefs
2005	12	(New Zealand) Crusaders	35–25	(Australia) Waratahs	(South Africa) Bulls	(New Zealand) Hurricanes
2006	14	(New Zealand) Crusaders	19–12	(New Zealand) Hurricanes	(Australia) Waratahs	(South Africa) Bulls
2007	14	(South Africa) Bulls	20–19	(South Africa) Sharks	(New Zealand) Crusaders	(New Zealand) Blues
2008	14	(New Zealand) Crusaders	20–12	(Australia) Waratahs	(South Africa) Sharks	(New Zealand) Hurricanes
2009	14	(South Africa) Bulls	61–17	(New Zealand) Chiefs	(New Zealand) Hurricanes	(New Zealand) Crusaders
2010	14	(South Africa) Bulls	25–17	(South Africa) Stormers	(New Zealand) Crusaders	(Australia) Waratahs
2011	15	(Australia) Reds	18–13	(New Zealand) Crusaders	(New Zealand) Blues	(South Africa) Stormers
2012	15	(New Zealand) Chiefs	37–6	(South Africa) Sharks	(New Zealand) Crusaders	(South Africa) Stormers
2013	15	(New Zealand) Chiefs	27–22	(Australia) Brumbies	(New Zealand) Crusaders	(South Africa) Bulls
2014	15	(Australia) Waratahs	33–32	(New Zealand) Crusaders	(South Africa) Sharks	(Australia) Brumbies
2015	15	(New Zealand) Highlanders	21–14	(New Zealand) Hurricanes	(Australia) Waratahs	(Australia) Brumbies
2016	18	(New Zealand) Hurricanes	20–3	(South Africa) Lions	(New Zealand) Chiefs	(New Zealand) Highlanders
2017	18	(New Zealand) Crusaders	25–17	(South Africa) Lions	(New Zealand) Chiefs	(New Zealand) Hurricanes
2018	15	(New Zealand) Crusaders	37–18	(South Africa) Lions	(New Zealand) Hurricanes	(Australia) Waratahs
2019	15	(New Zealand) Crusaders	19-3	(Argentina) Jaguares	(Australia) Brumbies	(New Zealand) Hurricanes
2020	15	season cancelled	—N/a	—N/a	—N/a	—N/a
2021	10	Regional competitions played, no official champions	—N/a	—N/a	—N/a	—N/a
2022	12	(New Zealand) Crusaders	21–7	(New Zealand) Blues	(New Zealand) Chiefs	(Australia) Brumbies
2023	12	(New Zealand) Crusaders	25–20	(New Zealand) Chiefs	(New Zealand) Blues	(Australia) Brumbies
2024	12	(New Zealand) Blues	41–10	(New Zealand) Chiefs	(Australia) Brumbies	(New Zealand) Hurricanes
2025	11	(New Zealand) Crusaders	16–12	(New Zealand) Chiefs	(New Zealand) Blues	(Australia) Brumbies
2026	11	(New Zealand) Hurricanes	60–5	(New Zealand) Chiefs	(New Zealand) Blues	(New Zealand) Crusaders

=== By team ===
Team	Combined	Super 12	Super 14	Super Rugby
(New Zealand) Crusaders	13	5	2	6
(New Zealand) Blues	4	3	0	1
(South Africa) Bulls	3	0	3	0
(Australia) Brumbies	2	2	0	0
(New Zealand) Chiefs	2	0	0	2
(New Zealand) Hurricanes	2	0	0	2
(Australia) Reds	1	0	0	1
(Australia) Waratahs	1	0	0	1
(New Zealand) Highlanders	1	0	0	1
Totals	29	10	5	14

=== By country ===
Country	Winning teams	Combined	Super 12	Super 14	Super Rugby
(New Zealand) New Zealand	Crusaders; Blues; Chiefs; Highlanders; Hurricanes	22	8	2	12
Australia	Brumbies; Reds; Waratahs	4	2	0	2
South Africa	Bulls	3	0	3	0
Totals	9	28	10	5	13

== Competition structure ==
=== 1996–2010 ===
Every season, each team played every other team once, in a round-robin. The venues for regular season matches alternated each year, therefore teams would not play one another at the same venue in consecutive seasons unless they met in the play-offs. The tournament used the rugby union bonus points system; teams were awarded four points for a win, two for a draw, and none for a loss. They received bonus points for scoring four or more tries in a match, and for a loss by seven or fewer points.

After each team had completed their regular season matches, the top 4 teams qualified for the semi-finals. Semi-finals were held under a Shaughnessy playoff system; the first-placed team in the table hosted the fourth-placed, and second hosted third. The winner of each semi-final advanced to the final, held at the home ground of whichever team amassed more points in the round-robin table.

=== 2011–2015 ===
In 2011, Melbourne Rebels joined the Super Rugby competition, meaning that Australia, New Zealand and South Africa would each be represented by five teams. The tournament format was also changed. Teams are divided into three conferences; one per country. Each team plays other teams in the same conference home and away, and plays eight further matches against teams from other conferences, for a total of sixteen games. Each team receives two byes throughout a season; from 2014 no points are added to the team's total on the day a bye is allocated. The highest placed team in each conference qualifies for the finals stage, along with three highest scoring teams which were not conference winners. The two highest scoring teams advance straight to the semi-finals, while the 3rd to 6th placed teams play-off to decide which two teams advance to the semis. The format of the semi-finals and final is the same as that previously used in the Super 14. The bonus points system has also been retained, with the single addition that a team receives four points for each bye.

=== 2016–2020 ===
2016 saw the tournament expand to 18 teams with the inclusion of an Argentine team and Japanese team. The South African conference was split in two with the Sunwolves in South African conference 1 and Jaguares in South African conference 2. South African conference 1 teams will play Australian and New Zealand teams in alternative years with South African conference 2 teams. Every team plays 16 games in the regular season with the top 8 teams qualifying for the quarter-finals 1 v 8 etc. with each conference winner being seeded 1–4.

=== 2020– ===
Due to the COVID-19 pandemic the 2020 Super Rugby season was suspended, and then ultimately cancelled. Regional tournaments were set up to complete the 2020 season, with Super Rugby AU played in Australia, Super Rugby Aotearoa played in New Zealand and Super Rugby Unlocked played in South Africa. The Jaguares and Sunwolves didn't compete in these regional tournaments, while the Western Force competed in Super Rugby AU and the Cheetahs, Griquas and Pumas competed in Super Rugby Unlocked. Only Super Rugby AU had a final as such for 2020, with a qualifying final and then final. Following the 2020 season, the South African sides withdrew from Super Rugby, while the Jaguares and Sunwolves also left the competition. Therefore, in 2021 only 10 teams competed in Super Rugby, again in regional tournaments with the addition of Super Rugby Trans-Tasman played between both Australian and New Zealand sides. A final was added to the Super Rugby Aotearoa competition in 2021, while a qualifying final and then final was again played in Super Rugby AU. Super Rugby Trans-Tasman will also have a final.

== Tournaments ==
=== Key ===
Symbol	Meaning
†	Champions
Games	Regular season record
Points	Regular season points scored and conceded
Diff	Difference between points scored and conceded
BP	Bonus points
TP	Table points

Teams mentioned are those that qualified for the play-off rounds. Results are written so that the score of the team in each row is mentioned first. The highlighted team won that season's Super Rugby final.

Note. For 1996 and 1997, it was the policy of the South African Rugby Union to send the top four teams of the previous year's Currie Cup to the Super 12. This resulted in the Sharks, Transvaal, Northern Transvaal and Western Province playing in 1996 and the Sharks, the Gauteng Lions, Free State Cheetahs and Northern Transvaal playing in 1997. In 1998, South Africa set up four (and later five, then six) Super Rugby regions, similar to the policy adopted by the New Zealand Rugby Union. For these areas, please see Super Rugby franchise areas.

=== Super 12 (1996–2005) ===
Super 12 annual playoff teams and Champion (1996–2005)
Year	Duration	Table position	Team	Games				Points			BP	TP	Semi score	Final score	Refs
Year	Duration	Table position	Team	played	won	drawn	lost	for	against	diff	BP	TP	Semi score	Final score	Refs
1996	28 February – 31 May	1	Reds	11	9	0	2	320	247	+73	5	41	25–43	—	
1996	28 February – 31 May	2	(New Zealand) Blues †	11	8	0	3	408	354	+54	9	41	48–11	45–21	
1996	28 February – 31 May	3	Northern Transvaal	11	8	0	3	329	208	+121	6	38	11–48	—	
1996	28 February – 31 May	4	Sharks	11	6	0	5	389	277	+112	9	33	43–25	21–45	
1997	1 March – 25 May														
1997	1 March – 25 May	1	(New Zealand) Blues †	11	10	1	0	435	283	+152	8	50	55–36	23–7	
1997	1 March – 25 May	2	Brumbies	11	8	0	3	406	291	+115	9	41	33–20	7–23	
1997	1 March – 25 May	3	Hurricanes	11	6	0	5	416	314	+102	10	34	20–33	—	
1997	1 March – 25 May	4	Sharks	11	5	2	4	321	350	–29	6	30	36–55	—	
1998	27 February – 30 May	1	Blues	11	9	0	2	388	296	+92	7	43	37–31	13–20	
1998	27 February – 30 May	2	(New Zealand) Crusaders †	11	8	0	3	340	260	+80	9	41	36–32	20–13	
1998	27 February – 30 May	3	Coastal Sharks	11	7	0	4	329	263	+66	8	36	32–36	—	
1998	27 February – 30 May	4	Highlanders	11	7	0	4	343	279	+64	6	34	31–37	—	
1999	26 February – 30 May	1	Reds	11	8	1	2	233	170	+63	2	36	22–28	—	
1999	26 February – 30 May	2	Stormers	11	8	0	3	290	244	+46	4	36	18–33	—	
1999	26 February – 30 May	3	Highlanders	11	8	0	3	280	203	+77	3	35	33–18	19–24	
1999	26 February – 30 May	4	(New Zealand) Crusaders †	11	7	1	3	322	262	+60	3	33	28–22	24–19	
2000	25 February – 27 May	1	Brumbies	11	9	0	2	393	196	+197	9	45	28–5	19–20	
2000	25 February – 27 May	2	(New Zealand) Crusaders †	11	8	0	3	369	293	+76	7	39	37–15	20–19	
2000	25 February – 27 May	3	Highlanders	11	6	0	5	310	280	+30	8	32	15–37	—	
2000	25 February – 27 May	4	Cats	11	7	0	4	320	334	–14	4	32	5–28	—	
2001	23 February – 26 May														
2001	23 February – 26 May	1	(Australia) Brumbies †	11	8	0	3	348	204	+144	8	40	36–6	36–6	
2001	23 February – 26 May	2	Sharks	11	8	0	3	322	246	+76	6	38	30–12	6–36	
2001	23 February – 26 May	3	Cats	11	7	0	4	285	244	+41	6	34	12–30	—	
2001	23 February – 26 May	4	Reds	11	6	0	5	300	277	+23	8	32	6–36	—	
2002	22 February – 25 May														
2002	22 February – 25 May	1	(New Zealand) Crusaders †	11	11	0	0	469	264	+205	7	51	34–23	31–13	
2002	22 February – 25 May	2	Waratahs	11	8	0	3	337	284	+53	7	39	10–51	—	
2002	22 February – 25 May	3	Brumbies	11	7	0	4	374	230	+144	10	38	51–10	13–31	
2002	22 February – 25 May	4	Highlanders	11	8	0	3	329	207	+122	6	38	23–34	—	
2003	21 February – 24 May														
2003	21 February – 24 May	1	(New Zealand) Blues †	11	10	0	1	393	185	+208	9	49	42–21	21–17	
2003	21 February – 24 May	2	Crusaders	11	8	0	3	358	263	+95	8	40	39–16	17–21	
2003	21 February – 24 May	3	Hurricanes	11	7	0	4	324	284	+40	7	35	16–39	—	
2003	21 February – 24 May	4	Brumbies	11	6	0	5	358	313	+45	7	31	21–42	—	
2004	20 February – 22 May														
2004	20 February – 22 May	1	(Australia) Brumbies †	11	8	0	3	408	269	+139	8	40	32–17	47–38	
2004	20 February – 22 May	2	Crusaders	11	7	0	4	345	303	+42	6	34	27–16	38–47	
2004	20 February – 22 May	3	Stormers	11	7	0	4	286	260	+26	5	33	16–27	—	
2004	20 February – 22 May	4	Chiefs	11	7	0	4	274	251	+23	5	33	17–32	—	
2005	25 February – 28 May														
2005	25 February – 28 May	1	(New Zealand) Crusaders †	11	9	0	2	459	281	+178	9	45	47–7	35–25	
2005	25 February – 28 May	2	Waratahs	11	9	0	2	322	174	+148	8	44	23–13	25–35	
2005	25 February – 28 May	3	Bulls	11	7	0	4	301	229	+72	6	34	13–23	—	
2005	25 February – 28 May	4	Hurricanes	11	8	0	3	281	248	+33	2	34	7–47	—	

=== Super 14 (2006–2010) ===
Super 14 annual playoff teams and Champion (2006–2010)
Year	Duration	Table position	Team	Games				Points			BP	TP	Semi score	Final score	Refs
Year	Duration	Table position	Team	played	won	drawn	lost	for	against	diff	BP	TP	Semi score	Final score	Refs
2006	February 10 – May 27														
2006	February 10 – May 27	1	(New Zealand) Crusaders †	13	11	1	1	412	210	+202	5	51	35–15	19–12	
2006	February 10 – May 27	2	Hurricanes	13	10	0	3	328	226	+102	7	47	16–14	12–19	
2006	February 10 – May 27	3	Waratahs	13	9	0	4	362	192	+170	9	45	14–16	—	
2006	February 10 – May 27	4	Bulls	13	7	1	5	355	290	+65	7	38	15–35	—	
2007	February 2 – May 19														
2007	February 2 – May 19	1	Sharks	13	10	0	3	355	214	+141	5	45	34–18	19–20	
2007	February 2 – May 19	2	(South Africa) Bulls †	13	9	0	4	388	223	+165	6	42	27–12	20-19	
2007	February 2 – May 19	3	Crusaders	13	8	0	5	382	235	+147	10	42	12–27	—	
2007	February 2 – May 19	4	Blues	13	9	0	4	355	235	+120	6	42	18–34	—	
2008	February 15 – May 31														
2008	February 15 – May 31	1	(New Zealand) Crusaders †	13	11	0	2	369	176	+193	8	52	33–22	20-12	
2008	February 15 – May 31	2	Waratahs	13	9	1	3	255	186	+69	5	43	28–13	12–20	
2008	February 15 – May 31	3	Sharks	13	9	1	3	271	209	+62	4	42	13–28	—	
2008	February 15 – May 31	4	Hurricanes	13	8	1	4	310	204	+106	7	41	22–33	—	
2009	February 13 – May 30														
2009	February 13 – May 30	1	(South Africa) Bulls †	13	10	0	3	338	271	+67	6	46	36–23	61-17	
2009	February 13 – May 30	2	Chiefs	13	9	0	4	338	236	+102	9	45	14–10	17–61	
2009	February 13 – May 30	3	Hurricanes	13	9	0	4	380	279	+101	8	44	10–14	—	
2009	February 13 – May 30	4	Crusaders	13	8	1	4	231	198	+33	7	41	23–36	—	
2010	February 12 – May 29														
2010	February 12 – May 29	1	(South Africa) Bulls †	13	10	0	3	436	345	+91	7	47	39–24	25–17	
2010	February 12 – May 29	2	Stormers	13	9	0	4	365	171	+194	8	44	25–6	17–25	
2010	February 12 – May 29	3	Waratahs	13	9	0	4	385	288	+97	7	43	6–25	—	
2010	February 12 – May 29	4	Crusaders	13	8	1	4	388	295	+93	7	41	24–39	—	

=== Super Rugby (2011–) ===
Six team playoff tournament (2011–2015)

Super Rugby annual playoff teams and Champion (2011–2015)
Year	Duration	Table position	Team	Conference position	Games				Points			BP	TP	Qualifier score	Semi score	Final score	Refs
Year	Duration	Table position	Team	Conference position	played	won	drawn	lost	for	against	diff	BP	TP	Qualifier score	Semi score	Final score	Refs
2011	February 18 – July 9																
2011	February 18 – July 9	1	(Australia) Reds †	1	16	13	0	3	429	309	+120	6	66	—	30-13	18–13	
2011	February 18 – July 9	2	Stormers	1	16	12	0	4	400	257	+143	7	63	—	10-29	—	
2011	February 18 – July 9	3	Crusaders	1	16	11	1	4	436	273	+163	7	61	36-8	29-10	13-18	
2011	February 18 – July 9	4	Blues	2	16	10	1	5	405	335	+70	10	60	26-13	13-30	—	
2011	February 18 – July 9	5	Waratahs	2	16	10	0	6	398	252	+146	9	57	13–26	—	—	
2011	February 18 – July 9	6	Sharks	2	16	10	1	5	407	339	+68	7	57	8–36	—	—	
2012	February 24 – August 4																
2012	February 24 – August 4	1	Stormers	1	16	14	0	2	350	254	+96	2	66	—	19-26	—	
2012	February 24 – August 4	2	(New Zealand) Chiefs †	1	16	12	0	4	444	358	+86	8	64	—	20-17	37-6	
2012	February 24 – August 4	3	Reds	1	16	11	0	5	359	347	+12	6	58	17-30	—	—	
2012	February 24 – August 4	4	Crusaders	2	16	11	0	5	485	343	+142	9	61	28-13	17-20	—	
2012	February 24 – August 4	5	Bulls	2	16	10	0	6	472	369	+103	11	59	13-28	—		
2012	February 24 – August 4	6	Sharks	3	16	10	0	6	436	348	+88	11	59	30-17	26-19	6-37	
2013	February 16 – August 4																
2013	February 16 – August 4	1	(New Zealand) Chiefs †	1	16	12	0	4	458	364	+94	10	66	—	20-19	27-22	
2013	February 16 – August 4	2	Bulls	1	16	12	0	4	448	330	+118	7	63	—	23-26	—	
2013	February 16 – August 4	3	Crusaders	2	16	11	0	5	446	307	+139	8	60	38-9	19-20	—	
2013	February 16 – August 4	4	Brumbies	1	16	10	2	4	430	295	+135	8	60	15-13	26-23	22-27	
2013	February 16 – August 4	5	Reds	2	16	10	2	4	321	296	+25	6	58	9-38	—	—	
2013	February 16 – August 4	6	Cheetahs	2	16	10	0	6	382	258	+24	6	54	13-15	—	—	
2014	February 16 – August 2																
2014	February 16 – August 2	1	(Australia) Waratahs †	1	16	12	0	4	481	272	+209	10	58	—	26-8	33-32	
2014	February 16 – August 2	2	Crusaders	1	16	11	0	5	445	322	+123	7	51	—	38-6	32-33	
2014	February 16 – August 2	3	Sharks	1	16	11	0	5	406	203	+113	6	50	31-27	6-38	—	
2014	February 16 – August 2	4	Brumbies	2	16	10	0	6	412	378	+34	5	45	32-30	8-26	—	
2014	February 16 – August 2	5	Chiefs	2	16	8	2	6	384	378	+6	8	44	30-32	—	—	
2014	February 16 – August 2	6	Highlanders	3	16	8	0	8	401	442	-41	10	42	27-31	—	—	
2015	February 13 – July 4																
2015	February 13 – July 4	1	Hurricanes	1	16	14	0	2	458	288	+170	10	66	—	29-9	14-21	
2015	February 13 – July 4	2	Waratahs	1	16	11	0	5	409	313	+96	8	52	17-35	17-35	—	
2015	February 13 – July 4	3	Stormers	1	16	10	1	5	373	323	+50	3	45	19-39	—	—	
2015	February 13 – July 4	4	(New Zealand) Highlanders †	2	16	11	0	5	450	333	+117	9	53	24-14	35-17	21-14	
2015	February 13 – July 4	5	Chiefs	3	16	10	0	6	372	299	+73	8	48	14-24	—	—	
2015	February 13 – July 4	6	Brumbies	2	16	9	0	7	369	261	+108	11	47	39-19	9-29	—	

Eight team playoff tournament (2016–2024)

Super Rugby annual playoff teams and Champion (2016–2024)
Year	Duration	Table position	Team	Conference position	Qualifying path	Games				Points			BP	TP	QF score	Semi score	Final score	Refs
Year	Duration	Table position	Team	Conference position	Qualifying path	played	won	drawn	lost	for	against	diff	BP	TP	QF score	Semi score	Final score	Refs
2016	February 26 – August 6																	
2016	February 26 – August 6	1	(New Zealand) Hurricanes †	1	1st NZ Conf	15	11	0	4	458	314	+144	9	53	41–0	25–9	20–3	
2016	February 26 – August 6	2	Lions	1	1st AF2 Conf	15	11	0	4	535	349	+186	8	52	42–25	42–30	3–20	
2016	February 26 – August 6	3	Highlanders	2	NZ/AU wc	15	11	0	4	422	273	+149	8	52	15–9	30–42	—	
2016	February 26 – August 6	4	Chiefs	3	NZ/AU wc	15	11	0	4	491	341	150	+7	51	60–21	9–25	—	
2016	February 26 – August 6	5	Stormers	1	1st AF1 Conf	15	10	1	4	440	274	+166	9	51	21–60	—	—	
2016	February 26 – August 6	6	Crusaders	4	NZ/AU wc	15	11	0	4	487	317	+170	6	50	25–42	—	—	
2016	February 26 – August 6	7	Brumbies	1	1st AU Conf	15	10	0	5	425	326	+99	3	43	9–15	—	—	
2016	February 26 – August 6	8	Sharks	2	AF wc	15	9	1	5	360	269	+91	5	43	0–41	—	—	
2017	February 23 – August 5																	
2017	February 23 – August 5	1	Lions	1	1st AF2 Conf	15	14	0	1	590	268	322	9	65	23–21	44–29	17–25	
2017	February 23 – August 5	2	(New Zealand) Crusaders †	1	1st NZ Conf	15	14	0	1	544	303	+241	7	63	17–0	27–13	25–17	
2017	February 23 – August 5	3	Stormers	1	1st AF1 Conf	15	10	0	5	490	436	+54	3	43	11–17	—	—	
2017	February 23 – August 5	4	Brumbies	1	1st AU Conf	15	6	0	9	315	295	+20	10	34	16–35	—	—	
2017	February 23 – August 5	5	Hurricanes	2	NZ/AU wc	15	12	0	3	596	272	+324	10	58	35–16	44–29	—	
2017	February 23 – August 5	6	Chiefs	3	NZ/AU wc	15	12	1	2	433	292	+141	7	57	17–11	13–27	—	
2017	February 23 – August 5	7	Highlanders	4	NZ/AU wc	15	11	0	4	488	308	+180	7	51	0–17	—	—	
2017	February 23 – August 5	8	Sharks	2	AF wc	15	9	1	5	408	354	+54	4	46	21–23	—	—	
2018	February 17 – August 4																	
2018	February 17 – August 4	1	(New Zealand) Crusaders †	1	1st NZ Conf	16	14	0	2	542	295	+247	7	63	40–10	30–12	27–18	
2018	February 17 – August 4	2	Lions	1	1st SA Conf	16	9	0	7	519	435	+84	10	46	40–23	44–26	18–27	
2018	February 17 – August 4	3	Waratahs	1	1st AU Conf	16	9	1	6	557	445	+112	6	44	30–23	26–44	—	
2018	February 17 – August 4	4	Hurricanes	2	NZ wc	16	11	0	5	474	343	+131	7	43	32–11	12–30	—	
2018	February 17 – August 4	5	Chiefs	3	NZ wc	16	11	0	5	463	368	+95	5	49	31–32	—	—	
2018	February 17 – August 4	6	Highlanders	4	NZ wc	16	10	0	6	437	445	-8	4	44	23–30	—	—	
2018	February 17 – August 4	7	Jaguares	2	SA wc	16	9	0	7	409	418	−9	2	38	23–40	—	—	
2018	February 17 – August 4	8	Sharks	3	SA wc	16	7	1	8	437	442	−5	6	36	10–40	—	—	
2019	February 15 – July 6																	
2019	February 15 – July 6	1	(New Zealand) Crusaders †	1	1st NZ Conf	16	11	3	2	497	257	+240	8	58	38–14	30–26	19–3	
2019	February 15 – July 6	2	Jaguares	1	1st SA Conf	16	11	0	5	461	352	+109	7	51	21–16	39–7	3–19	
2019	February 15 – July 6	3	Brumbies	1	1st AU Conf	16	10	0	6	430	366	+64	8	48	38–13	7–39	—	
2019	February 15 – July 6	4	Hurricanes	2	NZ wc	16	12	1	3	449	362	+87	3	53	35–28	26–30	—	
2019	February 15 – July 6	5	Bulls	2	SA wc	16	8	2	6	410	369	+41	5	41	28–35	—	—	
2019	February 15 – July 6	6	Sharks	3	SA wc	16	7	1	8	343	335	+8	7	37	13–38	—	—	
2019	February 15 – July 6	7	Chiefs	3	NZ wc	16	7	2	7	451	465	−14	4	36	16–21	—	—	
2019	February 15 – July 6	8	Highlanders	4	NZ wc	16	6	3	7	441	392	+49	6	36	14–38	—	—	
2020	January 31 – March 14																	
2020	January 31 – March 14	season cancelled																
2021	February 19 – June 19																	
2021	February 19 – June 19	regional competitions played, no official champions																
2022	February 18 – June 18	regional competitions played, no official champions																
2022	February 18 – June 18	1	Blues	N/A	N/A	14	13	0	1	472	284	+188	6	58	35–6	20–19	7–21	
2022	February 18 – June 18	2	(New Zealand) Crusaders †	N/A	N/A	14	11	0	3	470	268	+202	8	52	37–15	20–7	21–7	
2022	February 18 – June 18	3	Chiefs	N/A	N/A	14	10	0	4	453	348	+105	5	45	39–15	7–20	—	
2022	February 18 – June 18	4	Brumbies	N/A	N/A	14	10	0	4	404	306	+98	4	44	35–25	19–20	—	
2022	February 18 – June 18	5	Hurricanes	N/A	N/A	14	8	0	6	441	330	+111	7	39	25–35	—	—	
2022	February 18 – June 18	6	Waratahs	N/A	N/A	14	8	0	6	365	317	+48	6	38	15–39	—	—	
2022	February 18 – June 18	7	Reds	N/A	N/A	14	8	0	6	342	327	+15	3	35	15–37	—	—	
2022	February 18 – June 18	8	Highlanders	N/A	N/A	14	4	0	10	348	345	+3	7	23	6–35	—	—	
2023	February 24 – June 24																	
2023	February 24 – June 24	1	Chiefs	N/A	N/A	14	13	0	1	487	261	+226	7	59	29–20	19–6	20–25	
2023	February 24 – June 24	2	(New Zealand) Crusaders †	N/A	N/A	14	10	0	4	457	278	+179	8	48	49–8	52–15	25–20	
2023	February 24 – June 24	3	Blues	N/A	N/A	14	10	0	4	446	292	+154	6	46	41–12	15–52	—	
2023	February 24 – June 24	4	Brumbies	N/A	N/A	14	10	0	4	474	393	+81	6	46	37–33	6–19	—	
2023	February 24 – June 24	5	Hurricanes	N/A	N/A	14	9	0	5	480	338	+142	5	41	33–37	—	—	
2023	February 24 – June 24	6	Waratahs	N/A	N/A	14	6	0	8	387	408	−21	7	31	12–41	—	—	
2023	February 24 – June 24	7	Drua	N/A	N/A	14	6	0	8	370	492	−122	2	26	8–49	—	—	
2023	February 24 – June 24	8	Reds	N/A	N/A	14	5	0	9	391	451	−60	4	24	20–29	—	—	
2024	February 23 – June 22																	
2024	February 23 – June 22	1	Hurricanes	N/A	N/A	14	12	0	2	480	281	+199	8	56	47–20	19–30	—	
2024	February 23 – June 22	2	(New Zealand) Blues †	N/A	N/A	14	12	0	2	488	233	+255	7	55	36–5	34–20	41–10	
2024	February 23 – June 22	3	Brumbies	N/A	N/A	14	12	0	2	410	311	+99	4	52	32–16	20–34	—	
2024	February 23 – June 22	4	Chiefs	N/A	N/A	14	9	0	5	486	311	+175	7	43	43–23	30–19	10–41	
2024	February 23 – June 22	5	Reds	N/A	N/A	14	8	0	6	444	340	+104	8	40	21–43	—	—	
2024	February 23 – June 22	6	Highlanders	N/A	N/A	14	6	0	8	305	402	−97	4	28	16–32	—	—	
2024	February 23 – June 22	7	Drua	N/A	N/A	14	6	0	8	325	427	−102	2	26	5–36	—	—	
2024	February 23 – June 22	8	Rebels	N/A	N/A	14	5	0	9	341	488	−147	6	26	20–47	—	—	

Back to six team playoff tournament (2025–)

Super Rugby annual playoff teams and Champion (2025– )
Year	Duration	Table position	Team	Conference position	Qualifying path	Games				Points			BP	TP	QF score	Semi score	Final score	Refs
Year	Duration	Table position	Team	Conference position	Qualifying path	played	won	drawn	lost	for	against	diff	BP	TP	QF score	Semi score	Final score	Refs
2025	February 14 – June 21																	
2025	February 14 – June 21	1	Chiefs	N/A	N/A	14	11	0	3	550	319	+231	7	51	19–20	37–17	12–16	
2025	February 14 – June 21	2	(New Zealand) Crusaders †	N/A	N/A	14	11	0	3	471	371	+100	5	49	32–12	21–14	16–12	
2025	February 14 – June 21	3	Brumbies	N/A	N/A	14	9	0	5	448	361	+87	8	44	35–28	17–37	—	
2025	February 14 – June 21	4	Hurricanes	N/A	N/A	14	8	1	5	448	342	+106	5	39	28–35	—	—	
2025	February 14 – June 21	5	Reds	N/A	N/A	14	8	0	6	425	371	+54	6	38	12–32	—	—	
2025	February 14 – June 21	6	Blues	N/A	N/A	14	6	0	8	377	330	+47	9	33	20–19	14–21	—	
2026	February 13 – June 20																	
2026	February 13 – June 20	1	(New Zealand) Hurricanes †	N/A	N/A	14	11	0	3	562	298	+264	11	55	66–12	57–21	60–5	
2026	February 13 – June 20	2	Chiefs	N/A	N/A	14	11	0	3	515	325	+190	7	51	46–24	49–12	5–60	
2026	February 13 – June 20	3	Crusaders	N/A	N/A	14	8	0	6	488	388	+100	9	41	52–31	12–49	—	
2026	February 13 – June 20	4	Blues	N/A	N/A	14	8	0	6	456	412	+44	6	38	31–52	21–57	—	
2026	February 13 – June 20	5	Reds	N/A	N/A	14	8	0	6	364	386	−22	5	37	24–46	—	—	
2026	February 13 – June 20	6	Brumbies	N/A	N/A	14	7	0	7	402	373	+29	6	34	12–66	—	—	

== Regional competitions champions ==
Due to the COVID-19 pandemic, regionalised tournaments were played for the remainder of the 2020 Super Rugby season and the 2021 Super Rugby season. Those competitions were: Super Rugby AU (Australia), Super Rugby Aotearoa (New Zealand), Super Rugby Unlocked (South Africa) and Super Rugby Trans-Tasman (Australia & New Zealand).

Year	Super Rugby AU	Super Rugby Aotearoa	Super Rugby Unlocked	Super Rugby Trans-Tasman
2020	Brumbies	Crusaders	Bulls	—N/a
2021	Reds	Crusaders	—N/a*	Blues

* South Africa withdrew from all Super Rugby competitions at the end of the 2020 Super Rugby season.
