= 2022 Ireland rugby union tour of New Zealand =

- Coach: Andy Farrell
- Tour captain: Johnny Sexton
- Top test point scorer(s): Johnny Sexton (25 points)
- Top test try scorer(s): Andrew Porter (2 tries)
Summary
P	W	D	L
Total
5	3	0	2
Test match
3	2	0	1
Opponent
P	W	D	L
New Zealand
3	2	0	1

Tour chronology
- ← Australia 2018 South Africa 2024 →

In July 2022, Ireland played a 3 match test series against New Zealand as part of the 2022 mid-year rugby union internationals. Ireland also played two matches against the Māori All Blacks. This was Ireland's first tour since their tour to Australia in 2018, their first tour to New Zealand since 2012, and their first encounter against New Zealand since November 2021.

In the first test, at Auckland's Eden Park, New Zealand comfortably beat the visitors 42–19.

In the second test, in Dunedin, Ireland prevailed by 23–12 scoring their first victory against the All Blacks on New Zealand soil, and recorded their fourth win over New Zealand.

The following week Ireland became just the fifth touring side to achieve a series win in New Zealand, beating the All Blacks 32–22 in Wellington for a 2–1 series victory. The feat had only been previously accomplished by South Africa (1937), Australia (1949, 1986), the British & Irish Lions (1971), and France (1994).

== Fixtures ==
Date	Venue	Home	Score	Away
29 June 2022	FMG Stadium Waikato, Hamilton	Māori All Blacks	32–17	Ireland
2 July 2022	Eden Park, Auckland	New Zealand	42–19	Ireland
9 July 2022	Forsyth Barr Stadium, Dunedin	New Zealand	12–23	Ireland
12 July 2022	Sky Stadium, Wellington	Māori All Blacks	24–30	Ireland
16 July 2022	Sky Stadium, Wellington	New Zealand	22–32	Ireland

== Squads ==
Note: Ages, caps and clubs are as per 17 July 2022, the day after the end of the tour.

=== Ireland ===
On 14 June, Ireland named a 40-man squad for their 3-test series for the New Zealand tour.

Coaching team:

- Head coach: (England) Andy Farrell
- Assistant and attack coach: (England) Mike Catt
- Defence coach: (Ireland) Simon Easterby
- Forwards coach: (Ireland) Paul O'Connell
- Scrum coach: (Ireland) John Fogarty

Player	Position	Date of birth (age)	Caps	Club/province
Dave Heffernan	Hooker	31 January 1991 (aged 31)	7	Connacht
Rob Herring	Hooker	27 April 1990 (aged 32)	26	Ulster
Dan Sheehan	Hooker	17 September 1998 (aged 23)	10	Leinster
Finlay Bealham	Prop	9 October 1991 (aged 30)	25	Connacht
Tadhg Furlong	Prop	14 November 1992 (aged 29)	60	Leinster
Cian Healy	Prop	7 October 1987 (aged 34)	118	Leinster
Jeremy Loughman	Prop	22 July 1995 (aged 26)	0	Munster
Tom O'Toole	Prop	23 September 1998 (aged 23)	3	Ulster
Andrew Porter	Prop	16 January 1996 (aged 26)	46	Leinster
Ryan Baird	Lock	26 July 1999 (aged 22)	8	Leinster
Tadhg Beirne	Lock	8 January 1992 (aged 30)	33	Munster
Iain Henderson	Lock	21 February 1992 (aged 30)	68	Ulster
Joe McCarthy	Lock	26 March 2001 (aged 21)	0	Leinster
James Ryan	Lock	24 July 1996 (aged 25)	46	Leinster
Kieran Treadwell	Lock	6 November 1995 (aged 26)	8	Ulster
Jack Conan	Back row	29 July 1992 (aged 29)	30	Leinster
Gavin Coombes	Back row	11 December 1997 (aged 24)	2	Munster
Caelan Doris	Back row	2 April 1998 (aged 24)	20	Leinster
Peter O'Mahony	Back row	17 September 1989 (aged 32)	87	Munster
Cian Prendergast	Back row	23 February 2000 (aged 22)	0	Connacht
Nick Timoney	Back row	1 August 1995 (aged 26)	2	Ulster
Josh van der Flier	Back row	25 April 1993 (aged 29)	43	Leinster
Craig Casey	Scrum-half	19 April 1999 (aged 23)	5	Munster
Jamison Gibson-Park	Scrum-half	23 February 1992 (aged 30)	20	Leinster
Conor Murray	Scrum-half	20 April 1989 (aged 33)	99	Munster
Harry Byrne	Fly-half	22 April 1999 (aged 23)	2	Leinster
Joey Carbery	Fly-half	1 November 1995 (aged 26)	35	Munster
Johnny Sexton	Fly-half	11 July 1985 (aged 37)	108	Leinster
Bundee Aki	Centre	7 April 1990 (aged 32)	40	Connacht
Ciarán Frawley	Centre	4 December 1997 (aged 24)	0	Leinster
Robbie Henshaw	Centre	12 June 1993 (aged 29)	60	Leinster
James Hume	Centre	7 September 1998 (aged 23)	3	Ulster
Jimmy O'Brien	Centre	27 November 1995 (aged 26)	0	Leinster
Garry Ringrose	Centre	26 January 1995 (aged 27)	44	Leinster
Keith Earls	Wing	2 October 1987 (aged 34)	98	Munster
Mack Hansen	Wing	27 March 1998 (aged 24)	6	Connacht
James Lowe	Wing	8 July 1992 (aged 30)	15	Leinster
Hugo Keenan	Fullback	18 June 1996 (aged 26)	23	Leinster
Jordan Larmour	Fullback	10 June 1997 (aged 25)	30	Leinster
Michael Lowry	Fullback	20 August 1998 (aged 23)	1	Ulster

=== New Zealand ===
On 13 June the All Blacks' squad was announced, including six potential debutants. On 17 June New Zealand Rugby (NZR) announced lock Josh Lord had been ruled out of the tour with a ruptured ACL. On 27 June it was announced head coach Ian Foster, assistant coaches John Plumtree and Scott McLeod, and centres David Havili and Jack Goodhue had been ruled out of the first test after testing positive for COVID-19. Former Ireland head coach, Joe Schmidt was called in to coach New Zealand ahead of their first test against Ireland. Braydon Ennor was called into the squad as a midfield cover.

Coaching team:

- Head coach: (New Zealand) Ian Foster (Note: Ruled out of first test after testing positive for COVID-19.)
- Attack coach: (New Zealand) Brad Mooar
- Forwards coach: (New Zealand) John Plumtree
- Scrum coach: (New Zealand) Greg Feek

Player	Position	Date of birth (age)	Caps	Franchise/province
Dane Coles	Hooker	10 December 1986 (aged 35)	80	Hurricanes / Wellington
Samisoni Taukei'aho	Hooker	8 August 1997 (aged 24)	9	Chiefs / Waikato
Codie Taylor	Hooker	31 March 1991 (aged 31)	66	Crusaders / Canterbury
George Bower	Prop	28 May 1992 (aged 30)	10	Crusaders / Otago
Nepo Laulala	Prop	6 November 1991 (aged 30)	10	Blues / Counties Manukau
Aidan Ross	Prop	25 October 1995 (aged 26)	0	Chiefs / Bay of Plenty
Angus Ta'avao	Prop	22 March 1990 (aged 32)	20	Chiefs / Auckland
Karl Tu'inukuafe	Prop	21 February 1993 (aged 29)	25	Blues / North Harbour
Ofa Tu'ungafasi	Prop	19 April 1992 (aged 30)	44	Blues / Northland
Scott Barrett	Lock	20 November 1993 (aged 28)	48	Crusaders / Taranaki
Josh Lord (Note: Ruled out of test series due to a ruptured ACL.)	Lock	17 January 2001 (aged 21)	2	Chiefs / Taranaki
Brodie Retallick	Lock	31 May 1991 (aged 31)	92	Chiefs / Hawke's Bay
Tupou Vaa'i	Lock	27 January 2000 (aged 22)	11	Chiefs / Taranaki
Sam Whitelock	Lock	12 October 1988 (aged 33)	132	Crusaders / Canterbury
Sam Cane (c)	Loose forward	13 January 1992 (aged 30)	77	Chiefs / Bay of Plenty
Akira Ioane	Loose forward	16 June 1995 (aged 27)	13	Blues / Auckland
Dalton Papalii	Loose forward	11 October 1997 (aged 24)	12	Blues / Counties Manukau
Ardie Savea	Loose forward	14 October 1993 (aged 28)	59	Hurricanes / Wellington
Hoskins Sotutu	Loose forward	12 July 1998 (aged 23)	10	Blues / Counties Manukau
Pita Gus Sowakula	Loose forward	26 October 1994 (aged 27)	0	Chiefs / Taranaki
Finlay Christie	Half-back	19 September 1995 (aged 26)	5	Blues / Tasman
Folau Fakatava	Half-back	16 December 1999 (aged 22)	0	Highlanders / Hawke's Bay
Aaron Smith	Half-back	21 November 1988 (aged 33)	102	Highlanders / Manawatu
Beauden Barrett	First five-eighth	27 May 1991 (aged 31)	101	Blues / Taranaki
Richie Mo'unga	First five-eighth	25 May 1994 (aged 28)	32	Crusaders / Canterbury
Stephen Perofeta	First five-eighth	12 March 1997 (aged 25)	0	Blues / Taranaki
Jack Goodhue	Centre	13 July 1995 (aged 26)	19	Crusaders / Northland
David Havili	Centre	23 November 1994 (aged 27)	15	Crusaders / Tasman
Rieko Ioane	Centre	18 March 1997 (aged 25)	47	Blues / Auckland
Roger Tuivasa-Sheck	Centre	5 June 1993 (aged 29)	0	Blues / Auckland
Quinn Tupaea	Centre	10 May 1999 (aged 23)	7	Chiefs / Waikato
Caleb Clarke	Wing	29 March 1999 (aged 23)	5	Blues / Auckland
Leicester Fainga'anuku	Wing	11 October 1999 (aged 22)	0	Crusaders / Tasman
Sevu Reece	Wing	13 February 1997 (aged 25)	17	Crusaders / Tasman
Jordie Barrett	Fullback	17 February 1997 (aged 25)	36	Hurricanes / Taranaki
Will Jordan	Fullback	24 February 1998 (aged 24)	13	Crusaders / Tasman

== Matches ==
=== First match vs Māori All Blacks ===
29 June 2022
19:05 NZST (UTC+12)

Māori All Blacks	32–17	Ireland
Try: Sullivan 16' m Stevenson 28' c Weber 34' c Grace 40' c Con: Ioane (3/4) 29', 35', 40'; Pen: Ioane (2/3) 7', 27'	Report	Try: Aki 20' c Coombes 66' c Con: Frawley (2/2) 20', 67'; Pen: Frawley (1/1) 4'

Waikato Stadium, Hamilton
Attendance: 9,253
Referee: Wayne Barnes (England)

Team details

FB	15	Zarn Sullivan
RW	14	Shaun Stevenson	(substituted off) 49'
OC	13	Billy Proctor
IC	12	Rameka Poihipi
LW	11	Connor Garden-Bachop
FH	10	Josh Ioane	(substituted off) 68'
SH	9	Brad Weber (c)	(substituted off) 49'
N8	8	Cullen Grace
OF	7	Billy Harmon
BF	6	Cameron Suafoa	(substituted off) 68'
RL	5	Isaia Walker-Leawere
LL	4	Josh Dickson	(substituted off) 61'
TP	3	Tyrel Lomax	(substituted off) 53'
HK	2	Kurt Eklund	(substituted off) 68'
LP	1	Ollie Norris	(substituted off) 61'
Replacements:
HK	16	Tyrone Thompson	(substituted on) 68'
PR	17	Tamaiti Williams	(substituted on) 61'
PR	18	Jermaine Ainsley	(substituted on) 53'
LK	19	Manaaki Selby-Rickit	(substituted on) 61'
FL	20	TK Howden	(substituted on) 68'
SH	21	TJ Perenara	(substituted on) 49'
FH	22	Ruben Love	(substituted on) 68'
CE	23	Bailyn Sullivan	(substituted on) 49'
Coach:
(New Zealand) Clayton McMillan

FB	15	Jimmy O'Brien	(substituted off) 60'
RW	14	Jordan Larmour
OC	13	James Hume	(substituted off) 49'
IC	12	Bundee Aki (c)
LW	11	Keith Earls
FH	10	Ciarán Frawley
SH	9	Craig Casey
N8	8	Gavin Coombes	(substituted off) 79'
OF	7	Nick Timoney
BF	6	Cian Prendergast
RL	5	Joe McCarthy
LL	4	Kieran Treadwell	(substituted off) 51'
TP	3	Tom O'Toole
HK	2	Dave Heffernan	(substituted off) 51'
LP	1	Jeremy Loughman	(substituted off) 1'	(substituted on) 13'	(substituted off) 40'
Replacements:
HK	16	Niall Scannell	(substituted on) 51'
PR	17	Cian Healy	(substituted on) 1'	(substituted off) 13'	(substituted on) 40'	(substituted off) 69'
PR	18	Finlay Bealham				(substituted on) 69'
LK	19	Ryan Baird	(substituted on) 51'
N8	20	Jack Conan	(substituted on) 79'
SH	21	Conor Murray
FH	22	Joey Carbery	(substituted on) 60'
CE	23	Michael Lowry	(substituted on) 49'
Coach:
(England) Andy Farrell

Assistant referees:
Jordan Way (Australia)
Graham Cooper (Australia)
Television match official:
Marius van der Westhuizen (South Africa)

=== First test ===
2 July 2022
19:05 NZST (UTC+12)

New Zealand	42–19	Ireland
Try: J. Barrett 21' c Reece 30' c Tupaea 35' c Savea (2) 38' c, 53' c Sowakula 71' c Con: J. Barrett (6/6) 22', 31', 36', 39', 54', 72'	Report	Try: Earls 6' m Ringrose 44' c Aki 77' c Con: Carbery (2/2) 46', 78'

Eden Park, Auckland
Attendance: 48,195
Referee: Karl Dickson (England)

Team details

FB	15	Jordie Barrett
RW	14	Sevu Reece
OC	13	Rieko Ioane
IC	12	Quinn Tupaea	(substituted off) 60'
LW	11	Leicester Fainga'anuku
FH	10	Beauden Barrett
SH	9	Aaron Smith	(substituted off) 60'
N8	8	Ardie Savea
BF	7	Sam Cane (c)	(substituted off) 67'
OF	6	Scott Barrett
RL	5	Sam Whitelock
LL	4	Brodie Retallick	(substituted off) 63'
TP	3	Ofa Tu'ungafasi	(substituted off) 54'
HK	2	Codie Taylor	(substituted off) 54'
LP	1	George Bower	(substituted off) 60'
Replacements:
HK	16	Samisoni Taukei'aho	(substituted on) 54'
PR	17	Karl Tu'inukuafe (yellow card) 79' to end'	(substituted on) 60'
PR	18	Angus Ta'avao	(substituted on) 54'
FL	19	Pita Gus Sowakula	(substituted on) 63'
FL	20	Dalton Papalii	(substituted on) 67'
SH	21	Finlay Christie	(substituted on) 60'
FH	22	Richie Mo'unga	(substituted on) 60'
CE	23	Braydon Ennor
Coach:
(New Zealand) Ian Foster

FB	15	Hugo Keenan
RW	14	Keith Earls	(substituted off) 57'
OC	13	Garry Ringrose
IC	12	Robbie Henshaw
LW	11	James Lowe
FH	10	Johnny Sexton (c)	(substituted off) 31'
SH	9	Jamison Gibson-Park	(substituted off) 72'
N8	8	Caelan Doris	(substituted off) 57'
BF	7	Josh van der Flier
OF	6	Peter O'Mahony
RL	5	James Ryan
LL	4	Tadhg Beirne	(substituted off) 65'
TP	3	Tadhg Furlong	(substituted off) 67'
HK	2	Dan Sheehan	(substituted off) 63'	(substituted on) 67'
LP	1	Andrew Porter
Replacements:
HK	16	Dave Heffernan	(substituted on) 63'	(substituted off) 67'
PR	17	Cian Healy
PR	18	Tom O'Toole	(substituted on) 67'
LK	19	Kieran Treadwell	(substituted on) 65'
N8	20	Jack Conan	(substituted on) 57'
SH	21	Conor Murray	(substituted on) 72'
FH	22	Joey Carbery	(substituted on) 31'
CE	23	Bundee Aki	(substituted on) 57'
Coach:
(England) Andy Farrell

Assistant referees:
Wayne Barnes (England)
Jordan Way (Australia)
Television match official:
Marius van der Westhuizen (South Africa)

Notes:

- Leicester Fainga'anuku and Pita Gus Sowakula (New Zealand) made their international debuts.
- Finlay Bealham was originally named on the Ireland bench, but was replaced on match day by Tom O'Toole.

=== Second test ===
9 July 2022
19:05 NZST (UTC+12)

New Zealand	12–23	Ireland
Try: B. Barrett 40+1' c Jordan 78' m Con: J. Barrett (1/2) 40+2	Report	Try: Porter (2) 3' c, 48' c Con: Sexton (2/2) 4', 49'; Pen: Sexton (3/3) 14', 56', 68'

Forsyth Barr Stadium, Dunedin
Attendance: 30,748
Referee: Jaco Peyper (South Africa)

Team details

FB	15	Jordie Barrett
RW	14	Sevu Reece
OC	13	Rieko Ioane
IC	12	Quinn Tupaea
LW	11	Leicester Fainga'anuku	(yellow card) 17' to 27'	(substituted off) 50'
FH	10	Beauden Barrett		(substituted off) 57'
SH	9	Aaron Smith		(substituted off) 62'
N8	8	Ardie Savea		(substituted off) 33'
BF	7	Sam Cane (c)
OF	6	Dalton Papalii		(substituted off) 26'	(substituted on) 36'	(substituted off) 69'
RL	5	Scott Barrett				(substituted off) 74'
LL	4	Brodie Retallick		(substituted off) 43'	(substituted on) 55'
TP	3	Ofa Tu'ungafasi	(yellow card) 25' to 35'
HK	2	Codie Taylor		(substituted off) 57'
LP	1	George Bower				(substituted off) 64'
Replacements:
HK	16	Samisoni Taukei'aho		(substituted on) 57'
PR	17	Aidan Ross		(substituted on) 33'	(substituted off) 36'	(substituted on) 64'
PR	18	Angus Ta'avao	(red card) 31'	(substituted on) 26'
LK	19	Patrick Tuipulotu		(substituted on) 43'	(substituted off) 55'	(substituted on) 74'
FL	20	Pita Gus Sowakula				(substituted on) 69'
SH	21	Folau Fakatava		(substituted on) 62'
FH	22	Richie Mo'unga		(substituted on) 57'
FB	23	Will Jordan		(substituted on) 50'
Coach:
(New Zealand) Ian Foster

FB	15	Hugo Keenan
RW	14	Mack Hansen
OC	13	Garry Ringrose		(substituted off) 31'
IC	12	Robbie Henshaw
LW	11	James Lowe
FH	10	Johnny Sexton (c)		(substituted off) 74'
SH	9	Jamison Gibson-Park		(substituted off) 69'
N8	8	Caelan Doris		(substituted off) 64'	(substituted on) 76'
BF	7	Josh van der Flier
OF	6	Peter O'Mahony			(substituted off) 76'
RL	5	James Ryan	(yellow card) 39' to 49'	(substituted off) 69'
LL	4	Tadhg Beirne
TP	3	Tadhg Furlong		(substituted off) 65'
HK	2	Dan Sheehan		(substituted off) 64'
LP	1	Andrew Porter		(substituted off) 65'
Replacements:
HK	16	Rob Herring		(substituted on) 64'
PR	17	Cian Healy		(substituted on) 65'
PR	18	Finlay Bealham		(substituted on) 65'
LK	19	Kieran Treadwell		(substituted on) 69'
N8	20	Jack Conan		(substituted on) 64'
SH	21	Conor Murray		(substituted on) 69'
FH	22	Joey Carbery		(substituted on) 74'
CE	23	Bundee Aki		(substituted on) 31'
Coach:
(England) Andy Farrell

Assistant referees:
Karl Dickson (England)
Jordan Way (Australia)
Television match official:
Tom Foley (England)

Notes:

- This was Ireland's first ever victory over New Zealand in New Zealand.
- Scott Barrett (New Zealand) earned his 50th test cap.
- Folau Fakatava and Aidan Ross (New Zealand) made their international debuts.

=== Second match vs Māori All Blacks ===
12 July 2022
19:05 NZST (UTC+12)

Māori All Blacks	24–30	Ireland
Try: Stevenson 2' m Penalty try 44'; Love 69' m Weber 80' c Con: Ioane (1/3) 80+1'	Report	Try: Larmour 8'c, 77' m Timoney 32' c Coombes 66' m Con: Frawley (2/3) 33'; Pen: Frawley (2/2) 25', 41'

Wellington Regional Stadium, Wellington
Attendance: 11,216
Referee: Karl Dickson (England)

Team details

FB	15	Josh Moorby		(substituted off) 56'
RW	14	Shaun Stevenson	(yellow card) 72'
OC	13	Bailyn Sullivan
IC	12	Alex Nankivell		(substituted off) 63'
LW	11	Connor Garden-Bachop
FH	10	Josh Ioane
SH	9	TJ Perenara (c)		(substituted off) 49'
N8	8	Cullen Grace
OF	7	Billy Harmon
BF	6	Reed Prinsep		(substituted off) 15'
RL	5	Isaia Walker-Leawere
LL	4	Manaaki Selby-Rickit		(substituted off) 63'
TP	3	Tyrel Lomax		(substituted off) 56'	(substituted on) 78'
HK	2	Kurt Eklund		(substituted off) 63'
LP	1	Ollie Norris	(yellow card) 30' to 40'				(substituted off) 49'
Replacements:
HK	16	Leni Apisai		(substituted on) 63'
PR	17	Tamaiti Williams			(substituted on) 38'	(substituted off) 40'	(substituted on) 49'
PR	18	Marcel Renata		(substituted on) 56'	(substituted off) 78'
FL	19	TK Howden		(substituted on) 63'
FL	20	Caleb Delany		(substituted on) 15'	(substituted off) 38'	(substituted on) 40'
SH	21	Brad Weber		(substituted on) 49'
FH	22	Ruben Love		(substituted on) 56'
CE	23	Billy Proctor		(substituted on) 63'
Coach:
(New Zealand) Clayton McMillan

FB	15	Michael Lowry		(substituted off) 62'	(substituted on) 74'
RW	14	Jordan Larmour	(yellow card) 44' to 54'
OC	13	Keith Earls (c)
IC	12	Stuart McCloskey
LW	11	Jimmy O'Brien
FH	10	Ciarán Frawley
SH	9	Craig Casey
N8	8	Gavin Coombes
OF	7	Nick Timoney
BF	6	Cian Prendergast	(yellow card) 26' to 36'
RL	5	Kieran Treadwell		(substituted off) 56'
LL	4	Joe McCarthy
TP	3	Tom O'Toole		(substituted off) 76'
HK	2	Niall Scannell
LP	1	Jeremy Loughman		(substituted off) 61'
Replacements:
HK	16	Rob Herring
PR	17	Ed Byrne		(substituted on) 61'
PR	18	Michael Bent		(substituted on) 76'
LK	19	Ryan Baird		(substituted on) 56'
N8	20	Jack Conan
SH	21	Conor Murray
FH	22	Joey Carbery		(substituted on) 62'	(substituted off) 74'
WG	23	Mack Hansen
Coach:
(England) Andy Farrell

Assistant referees:
Christophe Ridley (England)
Jordan Way (Australia)
Television match official:
James Leckie (Australia)

Notes:

- This was Ireland's first ever victory over the Māori All Blacks.
- Finlay Bealham was originally named on the Ireland bench, but was replaced on match day by Michael Bent.

=== Third test ===
16 July 2022
19:05 NZST (UTC+12)

New Zealand	22–32	Ireland
Try: Savea 43' c R. Ioane 51' c Jordan 59' m Con: J. Barrett (2/3) 43', 52'; Pen: J. Barrett (1/2) 22'	Report	Try: Van der Flier 3' m Keenan 27' c Henshaw 36' c Herring 64' c Con: Sexton (3/4) 28', 37', 65'; Pen: Sexton (2/3) 31', 55'

Wellington Regional Stadium, Wellington
Attendance: 35,572
Referee: Wayne Barnes (England)

Team details

FB	15	Jordie Barrett
RW	14	Sevu Reece	(substituted off) 61'
OC	13	Rieko Ioane	(substituted off) 69'
IC	12	David Havili
LW	11	Will Jordan
FH	10	Beauden Barrett
SH	9	Aaron Smith	(substituted off) 61'
N8	8	Ardie Savea
BF	7	Sam Cane (c)	(substituted off) 63'
OF	6	Akira Ioane
RL	5	Sam Whitelock
LL	4	Brodie Retallick	(substituted off) 48'
TP	3	Nepo Laulala	(substituted off) 40'	(substituted on) 44'
HK	2	Codie Taylor	(substituted off) 61'
LP	1	George Bower	(substituted off) 71'
Replacements:
HK	16	Dane Coles	(substituted on) 61'
PR	17	Karl Tu'inukuafe	(substituted on) 71'
PR	18	Ofa Tu'ungafasi	(substituted on) 40'	(substituted off) 44'
FL	19	Tupou Vaa'i	(substituted on) 48'
FL	20	Dalton Papalii	(substituted on) 63'
SH	21	Folau Fakatava	(substituted on) 61'
FH	22	Richie Mo'unga	(substituted on) 61'
CE	23	Roger Tuivasa-Sheck	(substituted on) 69'
Coach:
(New Zealand) Ian Foster

FB	15	Hugo Keenan
RW	14	Mack Hansen
OC	13	Robbie Henshaw
IC	12	Bundee Aki		(substituted off) 68'
LW	11	James Lowe
FH	10	Johnny Sexton (c)		(substituted off) 75'
SH	9	Jamison Gibson-Park		(substituted off) 69'
N8	8	Caelan Doris
BF	7	Josh van der Flier		(substituted off) 53'	(substituted on) 58'
OF	6	Peter O'Mahony		(substituted off) 66'
RL	5	James Ryan
LL	4	Tadhg Beirne		(substituted off) 75'
TP	3	Tadhg Furlong		(substituted off) 69'
HK	2	Dan Sheehan		(substituted off) 52'
LP	1	Andrew Porter	(yellow card) 48' to 58'			(substituted off) 69'
Replacements:
HK	16	Rob Herring		(substituted on) 52'
PR	17	Cian Healy		(substituted on) 53'	(substituted off) 58'	(substituted on) 69'
PR	18	Finlay Bealham		(substituted on) 69'
LK	19	Kieran Treadwell		(substituted on) 75'
N8	20	Jack Conan		(substituted on) 66'
SH	21	Conor Murray		(substituted on) 69'
FH	22	Joey Carbery		(substituted on) 75'
WG	23	Keith Earls		(substituted on) 68'
Coach:
(England) Andy Farrell

Assistant referees:
Karl Dickson (England)
Christophe Ridley (England)
Television match official:
Tom Foley (England)

Notes:

- New Zealand's Scott Barrett (starting XV) and Aidan Ross had both been named in the team, but withdrew from the team ahead of kickoff. Akira Ioane replaced Barrett in the starting XV with Tupou Vaa'i joining the bench, whilst Karl Tu'inukuafe replaced Ross.
- Roger Tuivasa-Sheck (New Zealand) made his international debut.
- Ireland won a first test series in New Zealand for the first time in history.
- This was the first time since 1994, and just the fifth in history, that New Zealand lost a home test series.
- This was the first time since 1998 that New Zealand lost back-to-back home test matches.
- This was the first time that Ireland won back-to-back matches against New Zealand.
- With this win, Ireland claimed top spot in the World Rugby Rankings for the first time since 2019.

== See also ==
- 2022 July rugby union tests
- History of rugby union matches between Ireland and New Zealand
