= 2024 Super Rugby Pacific final =

Men's rugby union club competition

- Event: 2024 Super Rugby Pacific season
Chiefs	Blues
10	41
- Match details
- Date: 22 June 2024
- Venue: Eden Park, Auckland
- Man of the Match: Patrick Tuipulotu (Blues)
- Referee: Nic Berry (Australia)
- Attendance: 44,035

The 2024 Super Rugby Pacific final was the twenty-ninth Super Rugby final and penultimate rugby union match of the 2024 Super Rugby Pacific season. It was contested between the Chiefs and the Blues at Eden Park on 22 June 2024 to decide the champion of the 2024 Super Rugby Pacific season. The match, attended by over 44,000 spectators, was won by the Blues in a dominant performance, marking the franchise's fourth Super Rugby title. The title also ended a twenty-one year drought, ending the longest premiership drought in Super Rugby history. Patrick Tuipulotu was named "Man of the Match".

== Background ==
The final was the first meeting between the two New Zealand teams. Both held a win percentage above sixty-four percent, and a stellar home record (Chiefs, 5–1 (83%); Blues, 6–0 (100%)). However, between the two sides the Blues significantly outperformed the Chiefs in the regular season. The Blues had won three more matches than the Chiefs, scored more tries, and had the best defensive record in the competition for 2024.

== Road to the final ==
2024 Super Rugby Pacific standings
Pos	Team	Pld	W	D	L	PF	PA	PD	TF	TA	TB	LB	Pts	Qualification
1	Hurricanes	14	12	0	2	480	281	+199	70	38	7	1	56	Quarter-finals
2	Blues	14	12	0	2	488	233	+255	72	31	6	1	55	Quarter-finals
3	Brumbies	14	12	0	2	410	311	+99	54	41	4	0	52	Quarter-finals
4	Chiefs	14	9	0	5	486	311	+175	66	43	5	2	43	Quarter-finals
5	Reds	14	8	0	6	444	340	+104	66	46	4	4	40	Quarter-finals
6	Highlanders	14	6	0	8	305	402	−97	37	54	2	2	28	Quarter-finals
7	Drua	14	6	0	8	325	427	−102	40	60	1	1	26	Quarter-finals
8	Rebels	14	5	0	9	341	488	−147	49	67	4	2	26	Quarter-finals

Source: Super Rugby

=== Play-offs ===
Quarter-finals
7 June – Hamilton
Chiefs	43
Reds	21
8 June – Auckland
Blues	36
Drua	5

Semi-finals
15 June – Wellington
Hurricanes	19
Chiefs	30
14 June – Auckland
Brumbies	20
Blues	34

== Final ==
22 June 2024
19:05 (UTC+12)

Blues	41–10	Chiefs
Try: Akira Ioane 12'; Caleb Clarke (3) 22', 51', 62'; AJ Lam 73'; Con: Harry Plummer (5/5) 13', 22', 52', 63', 74'; Pen: Harry Plummer (2/2) 16', 40'	Report	Try: Simon Parker 66'; Con: Damian McKenzie (1/1) 67'; Pen: Damian McKenzie (1/2) 19'

Eden Park, Auckland
Attendance: 41,975
Referee: Nic Berry (Australia)

Blues	Chiefs

FB	15	Stephen Perofeta
RW	14	Mark Tele'a
CE	13	Rieko Ioane
SF	12	AJ Lam
LW	11	Caleb Clarke	(substituted off) 77'
FH	10	Harry Plummer
SH	9	Finlay Christie	(substituted off) 63'
N8	8	Hoskins Sotutu
OF	7	Dalton Papali'i	(substituted off) 65'
BF	6	Akira Ioane	(substituted off) 78'
LL	5	Sam Darry
RL	4	Patrick Tuipulotu (c)	(substituted off) 58'
TP	3	Marcel Renata	(substituted off) 63'
HK	2	Ricky Riccitelli	(substituted off) 70'
LP	1	Ofa Tuʻungafasi	(substituted off) 42'
Substitutes:
HK	16	Kurt Eklund	(substituted on) 70'
PR	17	Josh Fusitua	(substituted on) 42'
PR	18	Angus Taʻavao	(substituted on) 63'
LK	19	Josh Beehre	(substituted on) 58'
FL	20	Adrian Choat	(substituted on) 65'
SH	21	Taufa Funaki	(substituted on) 63'
CE	22	Bryce Heem	(substituted on) 77'
FB	23	Cole Forbes	(substituted on) 78'
Coach:
Vern Cotter

FB	15	Shaun Stevenson		(substituted off) 61'
RW	14	Emoni Narawa
OC	13	Anton Lienert-Brown
IC	12	Rameka Poihipi		(substituted off) 53'
LW	11	Etene Nanai-Seturo
FH	10	Damian McKenzie
SH	9	Cortez Ratima		(substituted off) 64'
N8	8	Wallace Sititi		(substituted off) 61'
OF	7	Luke Jacobson (c)
BF	6	Samipeni Finau		(substituted off) 51'	(substituted on) 61'
LL	5	Tupou Vaa'i
RL	4	Jimmy Tupou		(substituted off) 61'
TP	3	George Dyer	(yellow card) 50'	(substituted off) 61'
HK	2	Tyrone Thompson		(substituted off) 64'
LP	1	Aidan Ross		(substituted off) 53'	(substituted on) 65'
Substitutes:
HK	16	Mills Sanerivi		(substituted on) 64'
PR	17	Jared Proffit		(substituted on) 53'	(substituted off) 65'
PR	18	Reuben O'Neill		(substituted on) 51'	(substituted off) 61'	(substituted on) 61'
LK	19	Manaaki Selby-Rickit		(substituted on) 61'
FL	20	Simon Parker		(substituted on) 61'
SH	21	Xavier Roe		(substituted on) 64'
CE	22	Quinn Tupaea		(substituted on) 53'
CE	23	Daniel Rona		(substituted on) 61'
Coach:
Clayton McMillan

Man of the Match:
Patrick Tuipulotu (Blues)

Assistant Referees:
Damon Murphy (Australia)
Jordan Way (Australia)
Television match official:
Brett Cronan (Australia)
