= 2022 Super Rugby Pacific final =

Men's rugby union club competition

2022 Super Rugby Pacific Final
- Event: 2022 Super Rugby Pacific season
Blues	Crusaders
(New Zealand)	(New Zealand)
7	21
- Date: 18 June 2022
- Venue: Eden Park, Auckland
- Man of the Match: Sam Whitelock (Crusaders)
- Referee: Ben O'Keeffe (New Zealand)
- Attendance: 45,000

The 2022 Super Rugby Pacific Final was played between the Blues and the Crusaders, both of New Zealand. It was the 25th final in the Super Rugby competition's history, and the first since 2019 after the 2020 Super Rugby season was cancelled due to the COVID-19 pandemic and regional tournaments were played in the 2021 Super Rugby season. The Blues had qualified in first place on the regular season standings, while the Crusaders had qualified in second place. Both teams hosted quarter-final and semi-final matches.

The final was won by the Crusaders who beat the Blues by fourteen points. The Crusaders stretched their record number of Super Rugby wins to eleven, while also stretching their number of titles won to thirteen, having won both the 2020 Super Rugby Aotearoa season and 2021 Super Rugby Aotearoa season.

== Road to the final ==
Finals Series qualifying teams
Top 8 finishers
Pos	Team	W	D	L	PD	BP	Pts
1	(New Zealand) Blues	13	0	1	188	6	58
2	(New Zealand) Crusaders	11	0	3	202	8	52
3	(New Zealand) Chiefs	10	0	4	105	5	45
4	(Australia) Brumbies	10	0	4	98	4	44
5	(New Zealand) Hurricanes	8	0	6	111	7	39
6	(Australia) Waratahs	8	0	6	48	6	38
7	(Australia) Reds	8	0	6	15	3	35
8	(New Zealand) Highlanders	4	0	10	3	7	23

The 2022 season was a 12-team competition. The conference system from previous years was removed, with a single table introduced instead. Two new teams debuted in the 2022 season, with the Drua, representing Fiji, and Moana Pasifika, representing Pacific Islands heritage players, joining the five New Zealand sides and five Australian sides, following the full-time return of the Force to the competition. The top 4 sides in the competition earned home quarter-finals, with the following four sides in the table playing against them.

The Blues finished top of the overall table, having won thirteen of their fourteen fixtures round robin fixtures, and had won fifteen fixtures in a row heading into the final. The Crusaders had finished second overall having won eleven of their round robin fixtures. Heading into the fixture, Stephen Perofeta of the Blues was the competition's top points scorer, with 127 points, while Leicester Fainga'anuku and Will Jordan, both of the Crusaders, were the competition's top try scorers, both with ten tries.

In the quarter-finals the Blues beat fellow New Zealand team the Highlanders while the Crusaders beat the Reds. For the semi-finals, it was the Blues defeating the Brumbies in Auckland and the Crusaders defeating the Chiefs in Christchurch. Because of being the higher-placed team in the regular season log standings, the final was held in Auckland.

Quarterfinals
4 June – Auckland
Blues	35
Highlanders	6
4 June – Canberra
Brumbies	35
Hurricanes	25
3 June – Christchurch
Crusaders	37
Reds	15
4 June – Hamilton
Chiefs	39
Waratahs	15

Semifinals
11 June — Auckland
Blues	20
Brumbies	19
10 June – Christchurch
Crusaders	20
Chiefs	7

Final
18 June — Auckland
Blues	7
Crusaders	21

=== Quarterfinals ===
3 June 2022	Crusaders	37–15	Reds	Orangetheory Stadium, Christchurch
19:05 (GMT +12)	Try: Jordan 15'; Mo'unga 57'; Reece 65'; Williams 74'; Con: Mo'unga (4/4) 16', 58', 66', 76'; Pen: Mo'unga (3/3) 10', 32', 39'	Report	Try: Vunivalu 25'; Daugunu 43'; Con: Creighton (1/2) 44'; Pen: Creighton (1/1) 6'	Referee: Brendon Pickerill (New Zealand)

4 June 2022	Chiefs	39–15	Waratahs	FMG Stadium Waikato, Hamilton
16:35 (GMT +12)	Try: Weber (2) 6', 64'; L. Jacobson 22'; Nankivell 34'; Sowakula 71'; Con: Gatland (4/5) 7', 23', 36', 72'; Pen: Gatland (2/2) 3', 40+1'	Report	Try: Pietsch 8'; Harris 46'; Con: Edmed (1/2) 10'; Pen: Edmed (1/1) 19'	Attendance: 10,121; Referee: Nic Berry (Australia)

4 June 2022	Blues	35–6	Highlanders	Eden Park, Auckland
19:05 (GMT +12)	Try: A. Ioane 31'; Barrett (2) 35', 48'; Lam 59'; Tuivasa-Sheck 69'; Con: Perofeta (5/5) 33', 37', 49', 60', 70'	Report	Pen: Banks (2/2) 5', 30'; Cards: Makalio (red card) 22'	Attendance: 23,500; Referee: Angus Gardner (Australia)

4 June 2022	Brumbies	35–25	Hurricanes	GIO Stadium, Canberra
19:45 (GMT +10)	Try: Fainga'a 25'; Simone 31'; Banks 64'; Wright 74'; Con: White (1/1) 33'; Lolesio (2/3) 66', 76'; Pen: Lolesio (3/3) 8', 48', 61'; Cards: Ikitau (red card) 23'	Report	Try: Moorby (2) 17', 39'; Pen: Barrett (5/5) 4', 11', 23', 35', 42'; Cards: Franks (yellow card) 25'; Rayasi (yellow card) 73'	Referee: Paul Williams (New Zealand)

=== Semifinals ===
10 June 2022	Crusaders	20–7	Chiefs	Orangetheory Stadium, Christchurch
19:05 (GMT +12)	Try: Grace (2) 23', 35'; Con: Mo'unga (2/2) 25', 37'; Pen: Mo'unga (2/3) 6', 9'; Cards: Matera (yellow card) 20'; Matera (red card) 32'	Report	Try: Ta'avao 27'; Con: Gatland (1/1) 28'; Cards: Tupaea (yellow card) 8'	Attendance: 15,000; Referee: Nic Berry (Australia)

11 June 2022	Blues	20–19	Brumbies	Eden Park, Auckland
19:05 (GMT +12)	Try: Sotutu 23'; Tele'a 34'; Con: Perofeta (2/2) 24', 36'; Pen: Perofeta (2/2) 10', 21'; Cards: Eklund (yellow card) 52'; Choat (yellow card) 75'	Report	Try: Simone 3'; L. Lonergan (2) 59', 76'; Con: Lolesio (2/3) 4', 78'	Attendance: 26,900; Referee: Ben O'Keeffe (New Zealand)

== Match ==
The final was held at Eden Park in Auckland. Weather conditions were wet with persistent drizzle. It was thought to have been the first major rugby union final where both sides had been captained by brothers, with Beauden Barrett captaining the Blues and Scott Barrett captaining the Crusaders. Two other sets of brothers also played in the fixture, with the Goodhue brothers (Jack for the Crusaders and Josh for the Blues) and the Ioane brothers (Akira and Rieko both for the Blues) joining the Barrett brothers in the fixture.

=== Details ===
18 June 2022
19:05

Blues	7–21	Crusaders
Try: Christie 59'; Con: Perofeta (1/1) 60'	Report; Match Summary	Try: Hall 39'; Reece 76'; Con: Mo'unga (1/2) 40+1'; Pen: Mo'unga (2/3) 30', 46'; Drop: Mo'unga 13'

Eden Park, Auckland
Attendance: 45,000
Referee: Ben O'Keeffe (New Zealand)

Blues	Crusaders

FB	15	(New Zealand) Stephen Perofeta
RW	14	(New Zealand) AJ Lam
OC	13	(New Zealand) Rieko Ioane
IC	12	(New Zealand) Roger Tuivasa-Sheck	(substituted off) 45'
LW	11	(New Zealand) Mark Tele'a	(substituted off) 78'
FH	10	(New Zealand) Beauden Barrett (c)
SH	9	(New Zealand) Finlay Christie	(substituted off) 72'
N8	8	(New Zealand) Hoskins Sotutu	(substituted off) 40'	(substituted on) 44'
OF	7	(New Zealand) Adrian Choat			(substituted off) 47'
BF	6	(New Zealand) Akira Ioane
RL	5	(New Zealand) Tom Robinson
LL	4	(New Zealand) Josh Goodhue	(substituted off) 45'
TP	3	(New Zealand) Nepo Laulala	(substituted off) 54'
HK	2	(New Zealand) Kurt Eklund	(substituted off) 54'
LP	1	(New Zealand) Alex Hodgman	(substituted off) 54'
Substitutes:
HK	16	(New Zealand) Soane Vikena	(substituted on) 54'
PR	17	(New Zealand) Karl Tu'inukuafe	(substituted on) 54'
PR	18	(New Zealand) Ofa Tu'ungafasi	(substituted on) 54'
LK	19	(New Zealand) Luke Romano	(substituted on) 45'
LF	20	(New Zealand) Dalton Papalii	(substituted on) 40'	(substituted off) 44'	(substituted on) 47'
SH	21	(New Zealand) Sam Nock	(substituted on) 72'
CE	22	(New Zealand) Bryce Heem	(substituted on) 45'
FB	23	(New Zealand) Zarn Sullivan	(substituted on) 78'
Coach:
(New Zealand) Leon MacDonald

FB	15	(New Zealand) Will Jordan
RW	14	(New Zealand) Sevu Reece
OC	13	(New Zealand) Jack Goodhue
IC	12	(New Zealand) David Havili	(substituted off) 68'
LW	11	(New Zealand) Leicester Fainga'anuku	(substituted off) 68'
FH	10	(New Zealand) Richie Mo'unga
SH	9	(New Zealand) Bryn Hall	(substituted off) 59'
N8	8	(New Zealand) Cullen Grace
OF	7	(New Zealand) Tom Christie	(substituted off) 78'
BF	6	(Argentina) Pablo Matera	(substituted off) 78'
RL	5	(New Zealand) Sam Whitelock
LL	4	(New Zealand) Scott Barrett (c)
TP	3	(Ireland) Oli Jager	(substituted off) 52'
HK	2	(New Zealand) Codie Taylor	(substituted off) 59'
LP	1	(New Zealand) George Bower	(substituted off) 59'
Substitutes:
HK	16	(New Zealand) Brodie McAlister	(substituted on) 59'
PR	17	(New Zealand) Tamaiti Williams	(substituted on) 59'
PR	18	(New Zealand) Fletcher Newell	(substituted on) 52'
LK	19	(New Zealand) Quinten Strange	(substituted on) 78'
LF	20	(New Zealand) Corey Kellow	(substituted on) 78'
SH	21	(New Zealand) Mitchell Drummond	(substituted on) 59'
CE	22	(New Zealand) Braydon Ennor	(substituted on) 68'
WG	23	(New Zealand) George Bridge	(substituted on) 68'
Coach:
(New Zealand) Scott Robertson

Man of the Match:
Sam Whitelock (Crusaders)

Assistant referees:
Nic Berry (Rugby Australia)
Stu Curran (New Zealand)
Television match official:
Shane McDermott (New Zealand)

Preceded by 2019 Super Rugby Final	Super Rugby Pacific Final; 2022	Succeeded by 2023
