= Mason Tupaea =

New Zealander rugby union footballer (born 2002)

- Born: 16 October 2002 (age 24) Hamilton, New Zealand
- Height: 188 cm (6 ft 2 in)
- Weight: 108 kg (238 lb; 17 st 0 lb)
- School: Hamilton Boys' High School
- Notable relative: Quinn Tupaea

Rugby union career
- Position: Prop
- Current team: Waikato, Blues
Senior career
Years	Team	Apps	(Points)
2018–	Waikato		
2024–	Blues		

Mason Tupaea (born 16 October 2002) is a New Zealand professional rugby union footballer who plays as a prop forward for New Zealand province Waikato and Super Rugby side Blues.

== Early life ==
He attended Hamilton Boys High School and was called-up to New Zealand U18 rugby union team in 2020.

== Career ==
He represented Waikato in the National Provincial Championship from 2023 onwards. He scored a try in the semi final of the NPC in 2024 as his team bowed out to Wellington.

Having played for Blues U20 in 2022, he made his debut appearance in a match day squad for the Blues senior team in Super Rugby against Highlanders at Eden Park in May 2024.

On 24 June 2025, he was named as part of the Māori All Blacks squad to play Japan XV in Tokyo in June 2025 and Scotland in Whangārei in July 2025.

== Personal life ==
He is the son of Brent and Kelly Tupaea and has two brothers; Tane, and New Zealand rugby international Quinn Tupaea. They are New Zealanders of Māori descent (Waikato and Tainui descent).
