= Damian McKenzie =

NZ international rugby union player

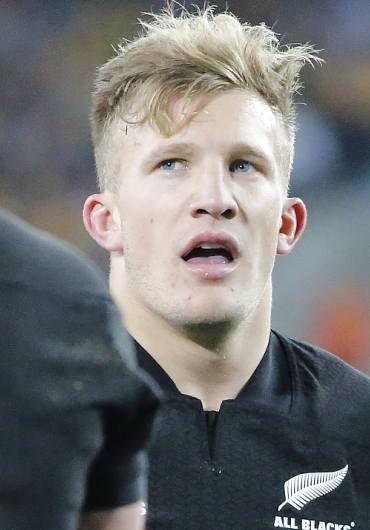
- McKenzie representing New Zealand in the 2017 Rugby Championship, August 2017
- Full name: Damian Sinclair McKenzie
- Born: 20 April 1995 (age 31) Invercargill, New Zealand
- Height: 174 cm (5 ft 9 in)
- Weight: 75 kg (165 lb; 11 st 11 lb)
- School: Christ's College
- Notable relative: Marty McKenzie (brother)

Rugby union career
- Position(s): Fullback, First five-eighth
- Current team: Waikato, Chiefs
Senior career
Years	Team	Apps	(Points)
2014–	Waikato	37	(421)
2015–	Chiefs	151	(1,591)
2022	Tokyo Sungoliath	14	(218)
- Correct as of 6 August 2026
International career
Years	Team	Apps	(Points)
2014	New Zealand U20	5	(25)
2015–2017	Māori All Blacks	4	(17)
2016–	New Zealand	85	(423)
- Correct as of 21 November 2026
Medal record
Men's Rugby union
Representing New Zealand
Rugby World Cup
Silver medal – second place	2023 France	Squad

Damian Sinclair McKenzie (born 20 April 1995) is a New Zealand rugby union player who plays as a first five-eighth or fullback for the All Blacks, as well as the Chiefs in Super Rugby and Waikato in the National Provincial Championship.

== Early life ==
McKenzie was born in 1995 in Invercargill, and attended Edendale primary school In Southland before moving to Canterbury where he received his secondary education at Christ's College in Christchurch.

== Rugby career ==
Since the beginning of the 2015 season, McKenzie has been contracted to the Chiefs franchise who compete in the Super Rugby competition. He has become a regular starter and is often in charge of goal kicking. He is their all time leading points scorer and is 4th in all time Super Rugby points scored. He has made 150 caps for the Chiefs as of June 2026.

McKenzie has received attention for his trademark smile before attempting a kick at goal.

In 2016, McKenzie played every game in the Chiefs' starting line-up at fullback. He finished the 2016 Super Rugby season as the Chiefs top try-scorer and the overall second highest try-scorer with 10 tries, behind Waratahs outside-back Israel Folau. He also finished the season as the second highest point-scorer with 199 points (10 tries, 43 conversion goals and 21 penalty goals); behind Hurricanes First Five Eighth Beauden Barrett.

McKenzie ranked top of the charts for carries, metres and defenders beaten in the 2017 Super Rugby season, while also ranked in the top three for clean breaks and points scored. In 2018, Damian McKenzie was the SANZAAR Player of the Season.

On 15 April 2019, McKenzie was diagnosed with a torn ACL suffered against the Blues at FMG Stadium Waikato in the Super Rugby competition. Due to the injury, McKenzie was not able to participate in the 2019 Rugby World Cup in Japan.

On 8 February 2020, Mckenzie was named at fullback for the Chiefs in their 25-15 victory over the Crusaders after recovering from his ACL injury.

In 2020, Mckenzie was chosen for the North Island to play in the North vs South rugby union match at Sky Stadium. Mckenzie kicked 100% off the boot, scoring 15 points, while also scoring a try and setting up another couple.

Mckenzie kicked off 2021 with a hiss and a roar, scoring tries in the Chiefs opening games of their Super Rugby Aotearoa season against the Highlanders and the Crusaders. Mckenzie then put on an inspiring performance, playing away at Sky Stadium against the Hurricanes to end the Chiefs record-breaking 11 match losing streak dating back to pre Covid 19 lockdown. He then scored the winning try against the Blues in the last minute the following week, the Chiefs snatching the victory 12-8. Following the bye week, Mckenzie slotted a historical match winning penalty against the Higlanders - from around 50m, in the first ever golden point extra time in New Zealand rugby. Again stealing the victory, winning 26-23 at Forsyth Barr Stadium. After three close wins, McKenzie then did it again. Knocking over the winning penalty in the dying minutes to beat the Crusaders (25-23) at home to a raucous crowd. He played at first five eight where he kicked at 100%, and out played incumbent All Blacks first-five, Richie Mo’unga. The following week he kicked another game winning penalty in the 84th minute from 45 metres to beat the Hurricanes (26-24) at home. He moved back to fullback and kicked 6 from 7 and scored 16 of the Chiefs 26 points. The Chiefs ended the regular season 2nd place and lost to the Crusaders in the Final. McKenzie finished 2021 Super Rugby Aotearoa as the top points scorer with 111 points.

McKenzie started at 10 in the Chiefs opening 2 games of Super Rugby Trans-Tasman, beating the Western Force and The Brumbies. In the 22nd minute of their encounter with the Queensland Reds, McKenzie was red carded for a high shot on halfback, Tate McDermott. The Chiefs playmaker was struck with a 3 game suspension for his actions.

McKenzie signed with Tokyo Sungoliath in the Japan Rugby League One competition. Tokyo Sungoliath finished runners up in the 2022 season after they lost 18-12 to Saitama Wild Knights in the final. He finished the season playing 14 matches and scoring 218 points which included 7 tries. Following the season, McKenzie re-signed with New Zealand Rugby and the Chiefs.

In November 2022, McKenzie made 2 appearances for the Barbarians against Bath and Harlequins.

In his first season back with the Chiefs, McKenzie guided them to a 31-10 win over the Crusaders in Round One. In round five against the Waratahs, McKenzie played his 100th game for the Chiefs when he started at fullback. In a round 6 clash vs the Blues, McKenzie scored 10 points as the Chiefs won six out of six games before heading into their bye. McKenzie and the Chiefs made it to the 2023 Super Rugby Final - losing 20-25 to the Crusaders in Hamilton. McKenzie finished the 2023 Super Rugby Pacific season as the top points scorer.

McKenzie was again instrumental in the Chiefs making another Super Rugby Pacific Final in 2024. The Chiefs finished 4th in the round robin - and went onto upset the Minor Premier Hurricanes in a famous semi final victory in Wellington. The Chiefs thus time losing to the Blues in Auckland. McKenzie again finished as the top points scorer.

McKenzie started 2025 with a hiss and a roar - guiding the Chiefs to an unbeaten 3/3 to start the season. Featuring prominently in the Chiefs victory over the Blues at Eden Park - where he scored 2 tries in a man of the match performance, out playing his opposite, Beauden Barrett.

=== 2016 ===
McKenzie was initially excluded from the All Blacks' 33-man squad for the 2016 Rugby Championship but was called up as injury cover for winger Waisake Naholo following Naholo tearing a hamstring. On 1 October 2016, McKenzie made his international test debut coming off the bench as a replacement for Ryan Crotty in the 48th minute during New Zealand's 36-17 win over Argentina in the round 5 of the Rugby Championship. On the 2016 All Blacks Northern Hemisphere Tour and following the All Blacks' first ever defeat to Ireland, he made his starting debut in the starting 15 playing at fullback in the team's 68-10 win over Italy. McKenzie was not subbed off against Italy and played the full 80 minutes, with Israel Dagg subbed off in McKenzie's favour.

=== 2017 ===
On 17 June 2017, McKenzie started for the Māori All Blacks at first-five-eighth against the touring British and Irish Lions in Rotorua. McKenzie played until the 67th minute when he was replaced by Ihaia West, with the Māori All Blacks losing to the tourists 10-32.

Despite an outstanding Super Rugby campaign with the Chiefs in 2017, McKenzie was not selected in the initial squad for the All Blacks for the Pasifika Challenge against Samoa and the three-test British and Irish Lions series, with the uncapped Hurricanes utility back Jordie Barrett being selected at McKenzie's expense. However, he was recalled to the team following Ben Smith's concussion in the first test. Despite being re-called, McKenzie did not manage to make the field in the black jersey against the Lions.

With Jordie Barrett ruled out for the rest of 2017 with shoulder surgery following the conclusion of Super Rugby and while Ben Smith took a sabbatical following the 35-29 victory over Australia on 26 August 2017, McKenzie received more game-time featuring at Fullback. The week prior which was a 54-34 win over the Australians saw McKenzie score his first try for the All Blacks off a pass from Rieko Ioane. His performances starting against Australia saw McKenzie become a regular starter for the All Blacks and he played in every single Rugby Championship test starting at fullback in 2017. Following a good performance against Argentina in Buenos Aires on 1 October 2017, where he scored a try and set All Blacks captain Kieran Read up for the opening try, McKenzie earned the award for Man of the Match. McKenzie earned that honour in two consecutive tests, winning the award the following week in the 25-24 win against South Africa where he played well and scored another try. McKenzie's try in the second test against South Africa saw him finish the 2017 Rugby Championship as the third-highest try scorer in the competition behind Rieko Ioane and Wallaby fullback Israel Folau, finishing the competition with four tries.

McKenzie's great form from the Rugby Championship continued in the 2017 end-of-year tests, with McKenzie having great defensive displays against Australia and France. McKenzie was able to maintain form and ended the 2017 season with good performances in wins over Scotland and Wales.

=== 2018 ===
In 2018, McKenzie was selected in the All Blacks squad for the June Test Series against France. In the first test he immediately made an impact off the bench, scoring a try from a 60m break, and assisting Ngani Laumape minutes later. In the second test Mckenzie came off the bench in the 10th minute to replace the injured Beauden Barrett. McKenzie had a mixed game, playing well enough to earn the start against the French for the 3rd test. McKenzie scored 24 points, scoring 2 tries and setting up another couple, kicking 7/7 goals. The All Blacks won the series 3-0.

McKenzie did not get any starts during the 2018 Rugby Championship. Coming off the bench against for the first four tests, he was then sent home from Argentina for a family bereavement and was dropped the next week against the Springboks in favour of Richie Mo'unga. McKenzie played well throughout the Championship with the opportunities he got, only playing a total of 106 minutes throughout the whole Rugby Championship.

McKenzie got his chance to start, playing at fullback in the third Bledisloe Cup match in Japan on the northern tour where he produced an outstanding performance combining with fellow playmaker Beauden Barrett in steering the team around the field during the All Blacks' 37-20 win over the Wallabies. McKenzie was then retained at fullback for the rest of the All Blacks northern tour matches, where he produced a fine showing against England, scoring the sole All Blacks try in their 16-15 victory at Twickenham. McKenzie started at fullback in the 16-9 defeat to Ireland in Dublin.

=== 2019 ===
Having torn his ACL during Super Rugby, McKenzie was not considered for 2019 Rugby World Cup selection due to injury. McKenzie did not play a test match in 2019.

=== 2020 ===
After playing a significant role for the Chiefs during Super Rugby Aotearoa, Mckenzie was named in the 2020 All Blacks squad. Mckenzie had limited game time, preferred off the bench, due to the continuation of the Mounga-Barrett partnership from the previous RWC. McKenzie started only one game, against Australia. Mckenzie played limited minutes off the bench in matches with Argentina and Australia - again out of favour to start over the likes of Beauden Barrett & Richie Mo’unga.

=== 2021 ===
McKenzie was named in the All Blacks' 36-man squad for the 2021 Steinlager Series. Mckenzie was picked at fullback for the first test against Tonga, where he scored the team's first try in a 102-0 win. Mckenzie was named in the squads for the two tests vs Fiji where the All Blacks comfortably beat Fiji.

McKenzie was later named in the All Blacks 36 man squad for the 2021 Rugby Championship. McKenzie was picked at fullback for the first match against Australia where he scored a try and helped the All Blacks to a 33-25 win. One week later he started at fullback against Australia where the All Blacks got the win 57-22, McKenzie notably made a 57 meter long penalty kick in this game. This win also sealed the Bledisloe Cup for New Zealand.

=== 2022 ===
After deciding not to resign with NZR & The Chiefs for the 2022 season, McKenzie was not eligible to play for the All Blacks after finishing his contract in Japan for Tokyo Sungoliath. In late 2022, McKenzie made 2 appearances for the All Blacks XV in their Northern Tour against Ireland Wolfhounds and the Barbarians at the Tottenham Hotspur Stadium.

=== 2023 ===
In 2023, McKenzie started his international year playing the full 80 minutes in Round 1 of The Rugby Championship against Argentina. McKenzie played his best game at 10 yet for The All Blacks. The following weeks McKenzie was not named in the match day 23, missing out to the likes of Beauden Barrett & Richie Mo’unga. He did not play again until Round 5 against Australia, where he set up a try for Shaun Stevenson, but was taken off after 48 minutes for Richie Mo’unga. McKenzie was hooked early after a shaky performance in the 10 jersey - with Mo’unga kicking a 79th minute penalty to win the game & cement the 10 jersey.

McKenzie was then named in the All Blacks 2023 Rugby World Cup squad. McKenzie wasn’t selected to play in the opening match defeat to the French, but did get to play until Round 2 against Namibia where he played the full 80 minutes. He came on off the bench in Round 3 against Italy and played 17 minutes and then played the full 80 minutes in Round 4 against Uruguay - setting up the potential try of the tournament with an audacious offload with limited space on the touch line. McKenzie had a brilliant group stage showing - scoring 5 tries in 3 tests, as well as scoring a total of 49 points. He was named on the bench in the famous quarter-final win match against Ireland where he did not get any time on the field. He played in the semi-final against Argentina where he played 25 minutes off the bench. He then played in the Rugby World Cup final against previous world cup winners South Africa where he came off the bench for only 6 minutes of game time. The All Blacks lost 11-12 - many All Black fans criticised outgoing coach Ian Foster for the lack of game time given to McKenzie in the final. Some even stating the All Blacks would have won if McKenzie was given the chance to kick the go-ahead goals that Richie Mo’unga & Jordie Barrett both missed late in the game.

=== 2024 ===
In 2024, McKenzie was a consistent starter at Fly-half position, starter his first test of 2024 against England and played the full 80 minutes and then the following week played the full 80 minutes again in the second test against England. McKenzie then played the full 80 minutes against Fiji in San Diego, US. The All Blacks won all 3 of these games, and McKenzie was now the preferred first choice first five under new All Blacks coach, Scott Robertson. McKenzie played his 50th test against Fiji.

In round 1 of The Rugby Championship, McKenzie played the full 80 minutes against Argentina where the All Blacks lost 38-30. This was McKenzie's first loss while wearing the All Blacks 10 jersey. McKenize the following week started for the All Blacks and played 50 minutes with the All Blacks ending the game with a 42-10 win against Argentina - McKenzie with a near perfect performance in the 10 jersey.

In round 3, McKenzie played 80 minutes against South Africa and then the following week in round 4, played again the full 80 minutes against South Africa - McKenzie scored all 12 of the All Blacks points of his boot. The All Blacks lost both tests in South Africa (31-27 & 18-12) - with McKenzie heavily criticised for missing a 40m penalty kick in front of the posts with less than 10 minutes to go in the second test. The Springboks were down 11-12 at this stage, and scored a converted try not long after the missed penalty. McKenzie was also criticised for his game management in both games, with The All Blacks being ahead in both games, and not closing them out late.

McKenzie was retained at 10 to play Australia, again heavily criticised for a rocks and diamond display. The All Blacks scraped the win, a 28-31 victory in Sydney. McKenzie created a lot, but lacked a finished edge to his game. The calls for him to be benched were confirmed by Scott Robertson the following week, Beauden Barrett started at 10 against The Wallabies at Sky Stadium, McKenzie benched for the first time in 2024. The All Blacks won the test 33-13, with McKenzie featuring prominently off the bench.

McKenzie was selected at 10 to play Japan in Tokyo, a 19-64 victory to the All Blacks - McKenzie with 14 points off the boot in a solid attacking display.

McKenzie was then selected on the bench against England the following week at Twickenham - with All Blacks coach, Scott Robertson, favouring Beauden Barrett to start in 10 jersey. With the All Blacks down by 8, Barrett came off injured with a concussion. McKenzie came on and kicked a penalty & the winning conversion from the sideline - a 24-22 victory for the All Blacks.

McKenzie was then selected to start at 10 for the All Blacks against Ireland the following week, with Barrett injured. He had a standout man of the match performance against Ireland in Dublin - kicking 18 points off the boot, in an all time great 10 performance. McKenzie was pivotal in the All Blacks 23-13 victory, over an Irish team who had won 20+ straight at home, and were ranked World number 1 at the time.

The following week, McKenzie was dropped to the bench to play France, following his Irish heroics - All Blacks coach, Scott Robertson, selecting Beauden Barrett after recovering from the head knock he suffered against England. McKenzie came on at fullback in the 60th minute, kicking 4/4 penalties (12 points) in a 30-29 defeat to The French at the Stade de France.

McKenzie was selected on the bench to play Italy in Milan. He came on at fullback with 15 minutes to go in 11-29 victory. Damian McKenzie featured in all 14 tests for the All Blacks in 2024 (10 starts, 4 bench) - one of 3 players to do so that year.

McKenzie was named in the 2024 World Rugby Dream Team at first-five (10) - alongside All Blacks team mates, Tyrel Lomax (prop - 3) & Will Jordan (fullback - 15). The All Blacks playmaker also finished as the leading points scorer in test rugby for the year, with 144 points.

=== 2025 ===
In 2025, McKenzie finished as the top point scorer of the 2025 Super Rugby Pacific season with 209 points in 14 appearances. He helped lead the Chiefs to the final, where they lost 16-12 to the Crusaders.

== International career ==
McKenzie represented New Zealand Under-20 during the 2014 IRB Junior World Championship scoring 1 try, 7 conversions and 2 penalties in 5 games.

On 29 May 2016, McKenzie was named in New Zealand's 33-man All Blacks squad for the June Test series against Wales. Although he was part of the All Blacks training camp, he did not play during the Test series due to winger Israel Dagg's return from injury.

== Career statistics ==
=== Super Rugby ===
As of 16 October 2026

Season	Team	Games	Starts	Sub	Mins	Tries	Cons	Pens	Drops	Points	Yel	Red
2015	Chiefs	16	9	7	758	0	7	9	0	41	1	0
2016	Chiefs	17	17	0	1360	10	43	21	0	199	0	0
2017	Chiefs	17	17	0	1360	6	22	22	0	140	0	0
2018	Chiefs	15	15	0	1090	6	39	23	0	177	0	0
2019	Chiefs	7	7	0	521	2	19	11	0	81	0	0
2020	Chiefs	12	12	0	944	1	18	21	1	107	0	0
2021	Chiefs	11	11	0	821	5	23	21	0	134	0	1
2023	Chiefs	16	15	1	1196	3	43	30	0	191	0	0
2024	Chiefs	15	15	0	1102	2	49	23	0	177	0	0
2025	Chiefs	14	14	0	1120	6	49	27	0	209	0	0
2026	Chiefs	11	11	0	877	5	46	6	0	135	0	0
Total		151	143	8	11149	46	358	214	1	1591	1	1

=== International tries ===
List of international test tries
No.	Opponent	Location	Competition	Date	Result	Ref.
1	Australia	Stadium Australia, Sydney	2017 Rugby Championship	19 August 2017	54-34	
2	Argentina	Yarrow Stadium, New Plymouth	2017 Rugby Championship	9 September 2017	39-22	
3	Argentina	Estadio Jose Amalfitani, Buenos Aires	2017 Rugby Championship	30 September 2017	36-10	
4	South Africa	Newlands Stadium, Cape Town	2017 Rugby Championship	7 October 2017	25-24	
5	Scotland	Murrayfield Stadium, Edinburgh	2017 end-of-year internationals	18 November 2017	22-17	
6	France	Eden Park, Auckland	2018 mid-year internationals	9 June 2018	52-11	
7	France	Forsyth Barr Stadium, Dunedin	2018 mid-year internationals	23 June 2018	49-14	
8	France	Forsyth Barr Stadium, Dunedin	2018 mid-year internationals	23 June 2018	49-14	
9	England	Twickenham Stadium, London	2018 end-of-year internationals	10 November 2018	16-15	
10	Italy	Stadio Olimpico, Rome, Italy	2018 end-of-year internationals	24 November 2018	66-3	
11	Italy	Stadio Olimpico, Rome, Italy	2018 end-of-year internationals	24 November 2018	66-3	
12	Italy	Stadio Olimpico, Rome, Italy	2018 end-of-year internationals	24 November 2018	66-3	
13	Tonga	Mt Smart Stadium, Auckland	2021 July rugby union tests	3 July 2021	102-0	
14	Australia	Eden Park, Auckland	2021 July rugby union tests	7 August 2021	33-25	
15	USA	FedEx Field, Washington D.C, USA	2021 end-of-year internationals	23 October 2021	104-14	
16	Namibia	Stadium de Toulouse, Toulouse, France	2023 Rugby World Cup	15 September 2023	71-3	
17	Namibia	Stadium de Toulouse, Toulouse, France	2023 Rugby World Cup	15 September 2023	71-3	
18	Italy	OL Stadium, Lyon, France	2023 Rugby World Cup	29 September 2023	96-17	
19	Uruguay	OL Stadium, Lyon	2023 Rugby World Cup	5 October 2023	73-0	
20	Uruguay	OL Stadium, Lyon	2023 Rugby World Cup	5 October 2023	73-0	
21	Argentina	Eden Park, Auckland	2024 Rugby Championship	17 August 2024	42-10	
22	Scotland	Murrayfield Stadium, Edinburgh	2025 end-of-year internationals	8 November 2025	25-17	
23	Ireland	Eden Park, Auckland	2026 Nations Championship	18 July 2026	40-17	
24	South Africa	Cape Town Stadium, Cape Town	Rugby's Greatest Rivaly	29 August 2026	33-26	

== Personal life ==
McKenzie and his partner, Georgia O'Sullivan, welcomed their first child in February 2026, a son. McKenzie is a New Zealander of Māori descent (Ngati Tuwharetoa descent), through his mother.

== Honours ==
=== Chiefs ===
- Super Rugby runners-up: 2023, 2024, 2025, 2026

=== Waikato ===
- Ranfurly Shield: 2015–2016
- National Provincial Championship: 2021

=== New Zealand ===
- Rugby Championship: 2016, 2017, 2018, 2020, 2021, 2023
- Bledisloe Cup: 2017, 2018, 2020, 2021, 2023, 2024, 2025, 2026
- Rugby World Cup runners-up: 2023
