= Quinn Tupaea =

New Zealander rugby union footballer (born 1999)

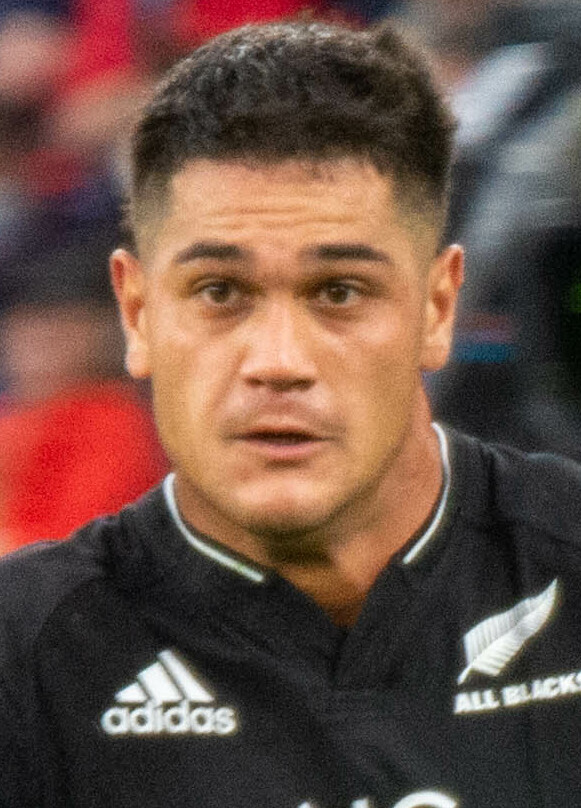
- Tupaea with New Zealand in 2021
- Full name: Quinn Puketahinga Claude Tupaea
- Born: 10 May 1999 (age 27) Hamilton, Waikato, New Zealand
- Height: 187 cm (6 ft 2 in)
- Weight: 102 kg (225 lb; 16 st 1 lb)
- School: Hamilton Boys' High School
- Notable relative: Mason Tupaea

Rugby union career
- Position(s): Centre, Wing
- Current team: Waikato, Chiefs
Senior career
| Years | Team | Apps | (Points) |
| 2018– | Waikato | 46 | (115) |
| 2020– | Chiefs | 79 | (100) |
- Correct as of 6 August 2026
International career
| Years | Team | Apps | (Points) |
| 2019 | New Zealand U20 | 7 | (20) |
| 2020- | Māori All Blacks | 3 | (0) |
| 2021– | New Zealand | 31 | (25) |
| 2024- | All Blacks XV | 2 | (5) |
- Correct as of 17 October 2026

Quinn Puketahinga Claude Tupaea (/tuːˈpʌɪˈjə/; born 10 May 1999) is a New Zealand professional rugby union player who plays as a centre for the Chiefs in Super Rugby, Waikato in the National Provincial Championship and the New Zealand national team. In his youth career, he was selected to play in the 2019 World Rugby Under 20 Championships for New Zealand and took part in Hamilton Boys' High School first XV, the top representative team in secondary school.

== Early life ==
Quinn Tupaea was born on 10 May 1999 in Hamilton, the son of Brent and Kelly Tupaea. He attended Southwell School and Hamilton Boys' High School.

== Professional career ==
=== Waikato ===
In May 2018, Waikato signed Tupaea for their 2018 Mitre 10 Cup season at 19 years old. He made his first professional team debut when he made the match-day fifteen at centre during the opening match against Manawatu at Central Energy Trust Arena. Tupaea became a regular starter, starting in eleven from twelve appearances and scoring seven tries. He also was a part of Waikato's historic Ranfurly Shield victory over Taranaki and their impressive top of the table finish. Tupaea finished sixth equal as leading try scorer in the Mitre 10 Cup, including scoring a brace of tries against Bay of Plenty and Northland. At seasons end, he achieved championship success after defeating Otago in order to gain promotion back into the top division and was awarded Emerging Player of the Year at the Waikato Rugby awards.

In an ultimately disappointing 2019 Mitre 10 Cup season for Waikato, in which the team narrowly avoided relegation to the Championship, Tupaea was a standout player for both Waikato and among all of the Mitre 10 Cup players. He proved to be one of the most consistently high performing centres in the competition, finishing 5th on the try-scoring table, with 7 tries in 9 games.

=== Chiefs ===
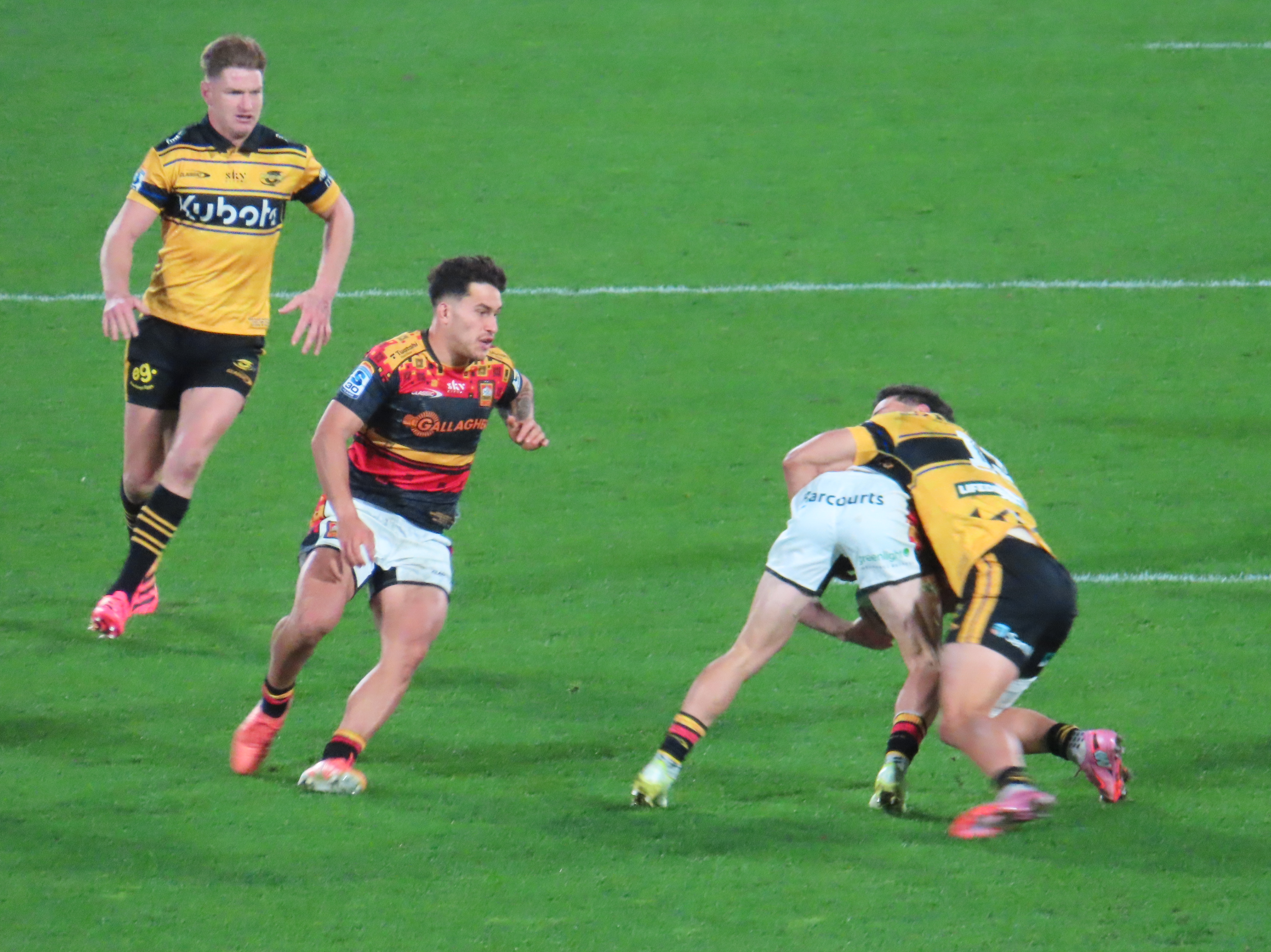
Tupaea playing in the 2026 Super Rugby Pacific final for the Chiefs, with Jordie Barrett in the background.

On the back of the 2019 Mitre 10 Cup season, Tupaea was announced in the Chiefs Super Rugby squad for the 2020 Super Rugby season, at the age of 20.

In June 2026, just before the 2026 Super Rugby Grand Final, Tupaea was announced as the Super Rugby's 2026 season Player of the Year, the second time the honour was awarded in its history. Tupaea, although equal on 43 points with the Highlanders' Timoci Tavatavanawai, was awarded the claim "via the tiebreaker of receiving more 'three votes' from the independent media panel across the season." Tupaea had also beaten out the Blues' Anton Segner, the Waratahs' Max Jorgensen, and Ben Donaldson of the Western Force.

== International career ==
Tupaea made his international debut for New Zealand on 3 July 2021 against Tonga at Auckland.

Tupaea suffered a severe knee injury in 2022.

== Personal life ==
Tupaea is a New Zealander of Māori descent (Waikato and Tainui descent).

== Statistics ==
| Club | Year | Competition | GP | GS | TRY | CON | PEN | DGL | PTS | WL% | Yellow card | Red card |
|---|---|---|---|---|---|---|---|---|---|---|---|---|
| Waikato | 2018† | Bunnings NPC (incl. Ranfurly Shield) | 12 | 11 | 7 | 0 | 0 | 0 | 35 | 66.67 | 0 | 0 |
| Waikato | 2019 | Bunnings NPC (incl. Ranfurly Shield) | 9 | 9 | 7 | 0 | 0 | 0 | 35 | 22.22 | 0 | 0 |
| Waikato | 2020 | Bunnings NPC (incl. Ranfurly Shield) | 9 | 9 | 5 | 0 | 0 | 0 | 25 | 44.44 | 1 | 0 |
| Waikato | 2021† | Bunnings NPC (incl. Ranfurly Shield) | 2 | 1 | 0 | 0 | 0 | 0 | 0 | 100.00 | 0 | 0 |
| Chiefs | 2020 | Super Rugby Pacific | 12 | 7 | 1 | 0 | 0 | 0 | 5 | 25.00 | 0 | 0 |
| Chiefs | 2021 | Super Rugby Pacific | 7 | 6 | 0 | 0 | 0 | 0 | 0 | 71.43 | 0 | 0 |
| Chiefs | 2022 | Super Rugby Pacific | 15 | 14 | 5 | 0 | 0 | 0 | 25 | 66.67 | 2 | 0 |
| Career | | | 66 | 57 | 25 | 0 | 0 | 0 | 125 | 51.52 | 3 | 0 |

Updated: 12 June 2022 Source: Quinn P C Tupaea Rugby History

=== List of international Test tries ===
| Try | Date | Venue | Opponent | Result | Competition |
|---|---|---|---|---|---|
| 1 | 23 October 2021 | FedExField, Summerfield, Maryland, United States | United States | 14–104 (won) | New Zealand Tour |
| 2 | 2 July 2022 | Eden Park, Auckland, New Zealand | Ireland | 42–19 (won) | 2022 Ireland tour of New Zealand |
| 3 | 6 September 2025 | Eden Park, Auckland, New Zealand | South Africa | 24–17 (won) | 2025 Rugby Championship |
| 4 5 | 4 October 2025 | Optus Stadium, Perth, Australia | Australia | 14–28 (won) | 2025 Rugby Championship |

Updated: 17 October 2026 Source: Quinn P C Tupaea Stats

== Awards and honours ==
Chiefs

- Super Rugby: 2024 (runners-up), 2025 (runners-up), 2026 (runners-up)

New Zealand

- The Rugby Championship: 2021, 2022

Individual

- Super Rugby Pacific Player of the Year: 2026
- Super Rugby Pacific Team of the Year: 2026
