= George Dyer (rugby union) =

New Zealand rugby union player

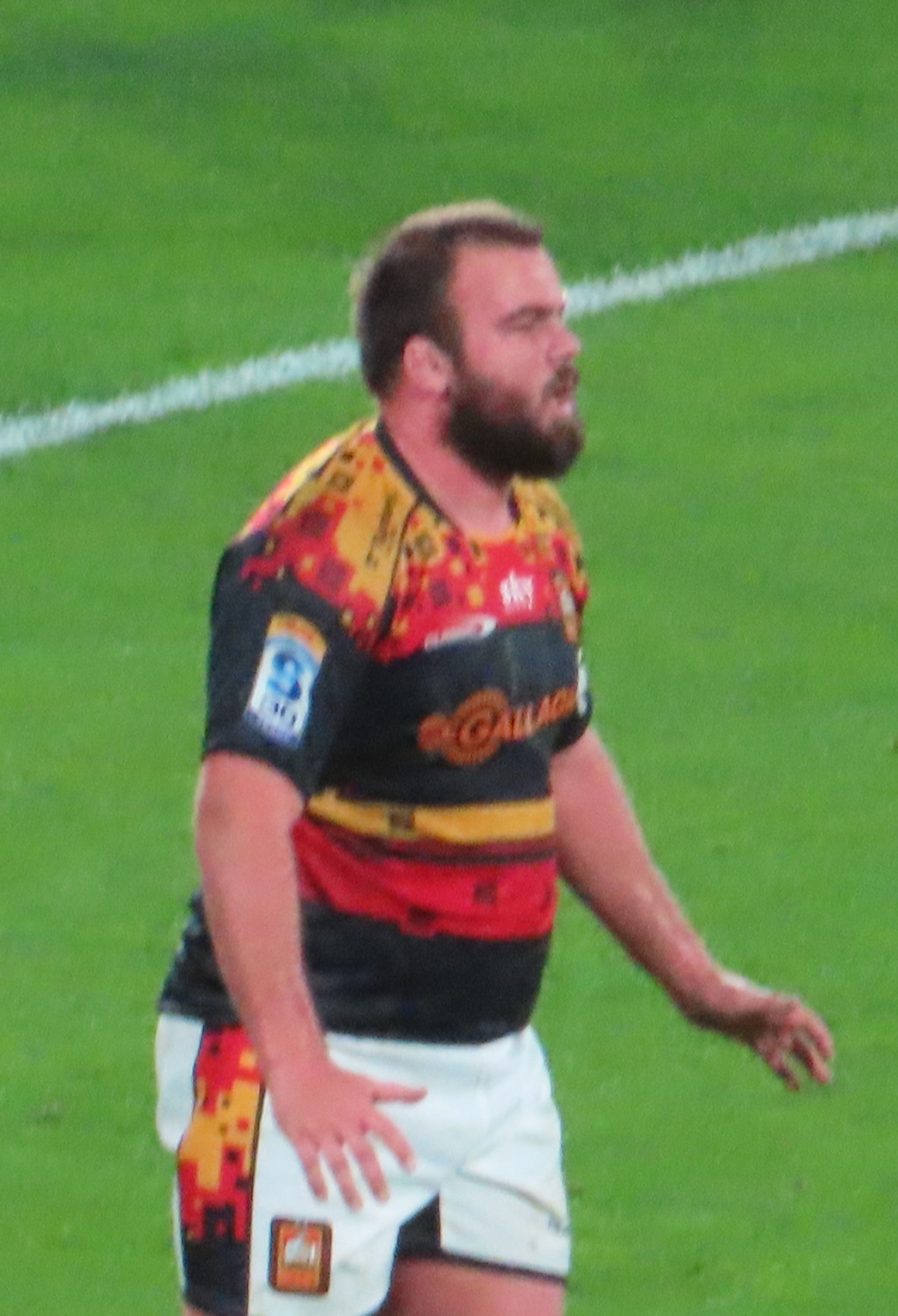
- Dyer playing for the Chiefs in the 2026 Super Rugby Pacific final
- Born: 22 October 1999 (age 27) New Zealand
- Height: 189 cm (6 ft 2 in)
- Weight: 124 kg (273 lb; 19 st 7 lb)

Rugby union career
- Position: Prop
Senior career
Years	Team	Apps	(Points)
2020–	Waikato	22	(0)
2020–	Chiefs	53	(15)
- Correct as of 9 May 2023
International career
Years	Team	Apps	(Points)
2019	New Zealand U20	4	(5)
2025	ANZAC XV	1	(0)
- Correct as of 24 August 2021

George Dyer (born 22 October 1999) is a New Zealand rugby union player who plays for Waikato in the National Provincial Championship. His playing position is prop.
