= Aidan Ross =

New Zealand rugby union player

- Born: 25 October 1995 (age 31) Sydney, New South Wales, Australia
- Height: 189 cm (6 ft 2 in)
- Weight: 111 kg (245 lb; 17 st 7 lb)
- School: Tauranga Boys' College

Rugby union career
- Position: Prop
- Current team: Queensland Reds
Senior career
Years	Team	Apps	(Points)
2015–2024	Bay of Plenty	63	(25)
2017–2025	Chiefs	101	(15)
2025–	Queensland Reds	12	(5)
- Correct as of 6 June 2026
International career
Years	Team	Apps	(Points)
2015	New Zealand U20	3	(0)
2017	New Zealand Barbarians	1	(0)
2022	New Zealand	1	(0)
2022	All Blacks XV	1	(0)
2025	ANZAC XV	1	(0)
2025–	Australia	9	(0)
- Correct as of 17 October 2026

Aidan Ross (born 25 October 1995) is an Australian-born, dual international rugby union player. A prop, he is a current Wallaby, a one-test All Black, and a member of the Queensland Reds in Super Rugby. He was first added to Australia's Wallabies squad for the final test against the 2025 British & Irish Lions tour to Australia, shortly after moving from New Zealand, where he had forged a professional career with the Chiefs, to his country of birth.

== Biography ==
Ross debuted for the Bay of Plenty in 2015 and was also a member of the New Zealand Under-20 squad who won the Under-20 Championship in Italy.

In 2017, he was called into the Chiefs squad as an injury cover and made his debut against the Western Force on 22 April. He captained the Bay of Plenty when they won the 2019 Mitre 10 Cup Championship final.

In 2021, Ross was called into the All Blacks squad as an injury cover for Karl Tu'inukuafe ahead of the second test against Fiji but did not get to play. He made his international debut for New Zealand against Ireland on 9 July 2022 at Dunedin.

Ross was the thirteenth player, and first prop, to play 100 games for the Chiefs. He reached the milestone in the first round of the 2025 finals, against the Blues, and ended with 101 caps.

In December 2024, Ross signed a three-year contract with the Queensland Reds beginning in July 2025 until the end of the 2027 Super Rugby season. Ross played his last match for the Chiefs on 21 June 2025 in the Super Rugby Pacific final, in which the Chiefs suffered defeat against the Crusaders. He made his Reds debut on 2 July 2025 in a match against the British & Irish Lions as part of their 2025 Australian tour.

On 28 July 2025, Ross was added to the Wallabies squad for the third and final test of the tour. He remained in the international squad in 2026 under new coach Les Kiss, and first faced his old All Blacks team in that year's Bledisloe Cup series.
