= Nic Berry =

Australian rugby union referee

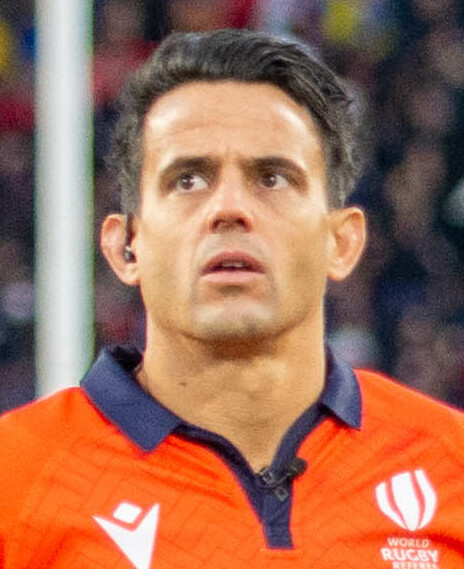
- Born: Nicholas Berry; 13 March 1984 (age 42) Brisbane, Australia
- Height: 1.73 m (5 ft 8 in)
- Weight: 80 kg (12 st 8 lb; 176 lb)

Rugby union career
- Position: Halfback
Senior career
Years	Team	Apps	(Points)
2004–2007	Queensland Reds	33	(0)
2007–2010	Racing Métro	51	(40)
2010–2013	London Wasps	56	(25)
Refereeing career
Years	Competition		Apps
2016–pres.	Super Rugby		1
2015–2019	NRC		5
- Correct as of 9 April 2016

Nic Berry (born 13 March 1984 in Brisbane) is an Australian former rugby union player, and current rugby union referee.

== Playing career ==
Berry was educated at Ipswich Grammar School in Queensland. He represented Australia in rugby union with the under-21 national team at the under-21 World Cup in Argentina. He made his Super 12 debut for the Queensland Reds against the Hurricanes in 2005. He started four games in 2005, and played another five off the bench. He made his run-on debut at halfback replacing the injured Josh Valentine in a match against the Bulls. In 2006 Berry was selected in the Australian Prime Minister's XV to take on the Japanese national team in Tokyo on 4 November. He was also part of the Sunnybank team that won the 2005 and 2007 Queensland Premier Rugby trophy.

In July 2007, it was rumoured that Berry was looking at offers from overseas and requesting a release from S14 and ARC commitments. He then left the Queensland Reds and moved to Racing Métro 92 Paris where he played for the following three seasons. At the beginning of the 2010–11 season Berry joined London Wasps on a two-year contract. After a number of strong performances he signed a contract extension for the following two seasons. Berry retired early into the 2012–13 season at the advice of his physician after sustaining a series of concussions.

== Refereeing career ==
Berry made a rapid rise up the refereeing ranks in 2015, making his debut both in Queensland Premier Rugby and in Australia's National Rugby Championship within a year of taking up the whistle.

He joined the Super Rugby referees panel for the 2016 season, and refereed his first match in Super Rugby on 9 April 2016, between the Stormers and Sunwolves.

He was selected as one of the referees at the 2019 Rugby World Cup.
