= Shaun Stevenson =

NZ international rugby union player

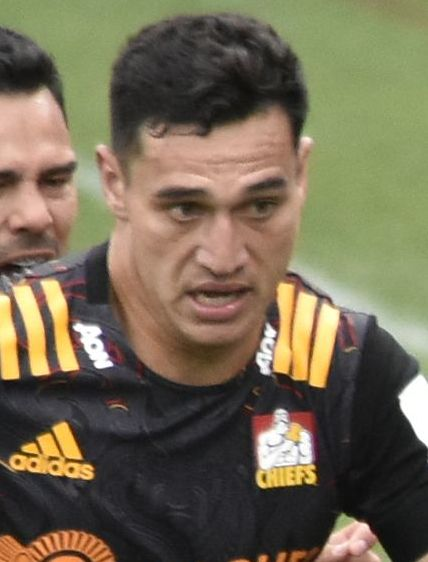
- Stevenson representing the Chiefs during the 2020 Super Rugby season, February 2020
- Full name: Shaun Tualaulelei Stevenson
- Born: 14 November 1996 (age 30) Auckland, New Zealand
- Height: 190 cm (6 ft 3 in)
- Weight: 100 kg (220 lb; 15 st 10 lb)
- School: Auckland Grammar School
- Notable relative(s): Salesi Rayasi (cousin); Casey Stevenson (cousin)

Rugby union career
- Position(s): Fullback, Wing
- Current team: Kubota Spears
Senior career
| Years | Team | Apps | (Points) |
| 2015–2016 | Waikato | 11 | (20) |
| 2016–2025 | Chiefs | 109 | (172) |
| 2017–2024 | North Harbour | 70 | (144) |
| 2025– | Kubota Spears | 26 | (84) |
- Correct as of 30 May 2025
International career
| Years | Team | Apps | (Points) |
| 2016 | New Zealand U20 | 4 | (17) |
| 2017–2022 | Māori All Blacks | 12 | (30) |
| 2019 | Barbarian F.C. | 1 | (5) |
| 2022–2024 | All Blacks XV | 3 | (10) |
| 2023 | New Zealand | 1 | (5) |
| 2025 | ANZAC XV | 1 | (0) |
| 2026– | Samoa | 3 | (0) |
- Correct as of 25 June 2025

Shaun Stevenson (born 14 November 1996) is a New Zealand rugby union player who currently plays as an outside back for North Harbour in New Zealand's domestic Mitre 10 Cup and the Chiefs in the international Super Rugby competition.

== Early career ==
Born in North Shore, in the Auckland suburbs, Stevenson attended Auckland Grammar School where he played first XV rugby for 3 years. During his high school years he also played for local Super Rugby franchise, the Blues at under-18 level.

== Senior career ==
Stevenson started out his provincial career with Hamilton-based side Waikato in 2015. He debuted in a match against Tasman on 14 August 2015 and went on to start in all 10 games during the season, scoring 4 tries in the process. He won the Waikato Supporters Club player of the year award as a reward for his fine debut season. 2016 was not such a happy year for him as a MCL knee injury 38 minutes into the opening match of the season ruled him out for the rest of the year.

In October 2016, it was announced that Stevenson would join newly promoted Mitre 10 Cup Premiership side North Harbour for 2017, a move that would take him back to his place of birth.

== Super Rugby ==
His debut season at provincial level brought him to the attention of local Super Rugby franchise, the Chiefs, who named him in their wider training group ahead of the 2016 Super Rugby season. He debuted in the opening match of the campaign, a New Zealand derby against the Crusaders, before a shoulder injury suffered in that game ruled him out for several weeks. In total he played 6 times and scored 2 tries in 2016. This was enough to see him promoted to the Chiefs main squad for 2017.

In May 2019, the Chiefs extended Stevenson until 2023. A month later, he scored the first hat-trick of his career in the big away victory 59-8 against the Melbourne Rebels, allowing the chiefs to qualify for the playoffs of the 2019 Super Rugby season.

On Week 2 of the 2023 Super Rugby season, he scored a hat-trick against Moana Pasifika. He confirmed his good start to the season on the following day when he scored twice against the Highlanders. These performances early on in the 2023 season brought a lot of attention to him with many stating he should be selected to the All Blacks.

== International career ==
Stevenson was a New Zealand Schools representative in 2014 and was also a member of the New Zealand Under 20 side which finished 5th in the 2016 World Rugby Under 20 Championship where he scored 5 tries in 4 appearances. Stevenson made his senior test debut in a Bledisloe Cup test match on 5 August 2023 versus Australia, where he scored a try and helped the All Blacks win 23-20.

== Personal life ==
Stevenson is a New Zealander of Samoan and Māori descent (Ngāpuhi descent).

== Super Rugby statistics ==
As of 15 April 2023

| Season | Team | Games | Starts | Sub | Mins | Tries | Cons | Pens | Drops | Points | Yel | Red |
|---|---|---|---|---|---|---|---|---|---|---|---|---|
| 2016 | Chiefs | 6 | 2 | 4 | 178 | 2 | 0 | 0 | 0 | 10 | 0 | 0 |
| 2017 | Chiefs | 17 | 3 | 14 | 510 | 4 | 0 | 0 | 0 | 20 | 0 | 0 |
| 2018 | Chiefs | 9 | 5 | 4 | 466 | 0 | 0 | 0 | 0 | 0 | 0 | 0 |
| 2019 | Chiefs | 11 | 8 | 3 | 696 | 4 | 0 | 0 | 0 | 20 | 0 | 0 |
| 2020 | Chiefs | 8 | 4 | 4 | 549 | 3 | 0 | 0 | 0 | 15 | 1 | 0 |
| 2021 | Chiefs | 10 | 6 | 4 | 594 | 1 | 0 | 0 | 0 | 5 | 0 | 0 |
| 2022 | Chiefs | 5 | 5 | 0 | 371 | 2 | 0 | 0 | 0 | 10 | 0 | 0 |
| 2023 | Chiefs | 17 | 15 | 2 | 1210 | 12 | 0 | 0 | 0 | 60 | 0 | 0 |
| Total | | 83 | 52 | 31 | 4576 | 28 | 0 | 0 | 0 | 140 | 1 | 0 |
