= Clayton McMillan =

New Zealand professional rugby union coach

- Full name: Clayton Rangihau McMillan
- Born: 6 August 1974 (age 52) Perth, Australia

Rugby union career
- Position: Head Coach
- Current team: Munster Rugby
Senior career
Years	Team	Apps	(Points)
1995–2003	Bay of Plenty	113	(110)
2003–2007	Coca-Cola Red Sparks		
Coaching career
- Years: Team
- 2003–2007: Coca-Cola Red Sparks (Player/Coach)
- 2007–2009: Whakarewarewa
- 2008–2010: New Zealand U20 (Selector)
- 2009: Bay of Plenty U20
- 2010: Bay of Plenty Development
- 2011–2012: Marist St Pats
- 2013: Wellington U20 (Forwards coach)
- 2014: Wellington U19
- 2015–2021: Bay of Plenty
- 2015–2020: New Zealand U20 (Positions coach)
- 2017: New Zealand Barbarians
- 2017–2023: Māori All Blacks
- 2021–2025: Chiefs
- 2022–2024: All Blacks XV (Assistant coach) (Head coach)
- 2025–: Munster Rugby

Clayton McMillan is a New Zealand professional rugby union coach. He is the current head coach of Munster Rugby.

Clayton McMillan was born in Perth, Australia but was raised in Rotorua, New Zealand. McMillan was educated at Rotorua Boys High School. He worked as a Police officer in Rotorua. McMillan represented the Whakarewarewa rugby club and played for Bay of Plenty as a Number 8 from 1995 to 2003, playing over 100 matches. He also represented the New Zealand Divisional team in 2000.

In February 2020, McMillan was named as the interim head coach for the Chiefs in the Super Rugby competition.

He previously coached Bay of Plenty before taking up his role at the Chiefs.

In February 2025, it was announced that McMillan will take up the role of head coach at Munster Rugby from July 2025 on a three-year contract.

== Personal life ==
McMillan is a New Zealander of Māori descent (Ngāi Te Rangi, Ngāi Tamawhariua and Te Rangaihouhiri descent).
