= 2025 Super Rugby Pacific season =

Men's rugby union club competition

- Dates: 14 February – 21 June 2025
- Countries: Australia (4 teams); Fiji (1 team); New Zealand (5 teams); Pacific Islands (1 team)
- Tournament format(s): Round-robin and knockout
- Champions: Crusaders (13th title)
- Matches played: 83
- Tries scored: 670 (8.07 per match)
- Top point scorer(s): (New Zealand) Damian McKenzie, Chiefs (209)
- Top try scorer(s): (Australia) Carlo Tizzano, Force (13)
- Official website: super.rugby/superrugby

The 2025 Super Rugby Pacific season (Note: Known as the SMARTECH Super Rugby Pacific in Australia, the Shop N Save Super Rugby Pacific in Fiji, and DHL Super Rugby Pacific in New Zealand for sponsorship reasons.) was the 30th season of Super Rugby, an annual rugby union competition organised by SANZAAR between teams from Australia, Fiji, New Zealand and a combined team from Samoa, Tonga and other Pacific Island nations. The defending champions were the Blues, who won their fourth title in 2024.

The competition was reduced from twelve teams in 2024 to eleven following the axing of Australian team Melbourne Rebels.

The season started on 14 February 2025 and the Grand Final was played on Saturday 21 June, before the start of the 2025 mid-year international window.

== Format ==
The competition format remained the same from the previous season (2024), with an extra regular season round and the finals series being the major changes, alongside the fixture list and afternoon fixture times. Eleven teams played in a round-robin format, with seven matches at home and seven away, and two byes. The fourteen games included teams playing four teams twice, with a focus on "rivalry match-ups", and the six remaining teams once. At the conclusion of the regular season, the top six teams on the season ladder competed in the qualifying finals. The first-placed team went head-to-head against the sixth-placed team; the second-placed team went head-to-head against the fifth-placed team; and the third-placed team against the fourth-placed team.

Each winner and the highest-seeded losing team advanced to the semi-finals. Teams were re-seeded based on their regular season placings; this included the highest-seeded loser, which was then penalised one seeding rank (for instance, if the 1st-placed team lost its qualifying final, it would be re-seeded in the 2nd position in the semi-final round). The winners of each semi-final (1st vs 4th, 2nd vs 3rd) advanced to the Grand Final, the highest-seeded team being the hosts.

The rankings on the competition table were determined by the number of competition points earned during the regular season. Competition points could be gained in the following way: four points were awarded to the winning team, two points to each team for a draw, and no points for a loss. Teams could also receive a singular bonus point if they scored at least three tries more than the opponent in a match, or lose by seven points or less.

== Standings ==
The current standings for the 2025 Super Rugby Pacific season are:

2025 Super Rugby Pacific standings
Pos	Team	Pld	W	D	L	PF	PA	PD	TF	TA	TB	LB	Pts	Qualification
1	Chiefs (RU)	14	11	0	3	550	319	+231	75	45	5	2	51	Qualifying finals
2	Crusaders (C)	14	11	0	3	471	371	+100	70	51	5	0	49	Qualifying finals
3	Brumbies	14	9	0	5	448	361	+87	66	50	4	4	44	Qualifying finals
4	Hurricanes	14	8	1	5	448	342	+106	63	46	2	3	39	Qualifying finals
5	Reds	14	8	0	6	425	371	+54	63	52	4	2	38	Qualifying finals
6	Blues	14	6	0	8	377	330	+47	55	41	5	4	33	Qualifying finals
7	Moana Pasifika	14	6	0	8	405	544	−139	60	80	2	2	28	
8	Waratahs	14	6	0	8	317	451	−134	46	67	1	1	26	
9	Force	14	4	1	9	358	472	−114	51	70	2	3	23	
10	Drua	14	4	0	10	317	465	−148	45	73	1	3	20	
11	Highlanders	14	3	0	11	332	422	−90	43	62	1	7	20	

Source: Super Rugby
(C) Champions; (RU) Runners-up

Competition rules
Competition points breakdown:
* 4 competition points for a win
* 2 competition points for a draw
* 1 competition bonus point for a loss by seven points or less
* 1 competition bonus point for scoring at least three tries more than the opponent in a match
Tiebreaker rules:
If, at any stage, teams have the same number of competition points, the following tiebreaker rules apply (in this order) to determine their standing:
* Most wins from all matches
* Highest difference between total points for and total points against from all matches (points difference)
* Most tries scored from all matches
* Highest difference between total tries for and total tries against from all matches
* Coin toss

=== Round-by-round ===
The table below shows each team's progression throughout the season. For each round, their cumulative points total is shown with the overall log position in brackets:

Team progression
Team	R1	R2	R3	R4	R5	R6	R7	R8	R9	R10	R11	R12	R13	R14	R15	R16	QF	SF	Final
Blues	0 (11th)	0 (11th)	5 (8th)	6 (10th)	7 (9th)	7 (9th)	7 (10th)	11 (10th)	16 (9th)	17 (8th)	17 (9th)	22 (7th)	27 (5th)	28 (7th)	28 (7th)	33 (6th)	Won	Lost	DNQ
Brumbies	4 (3rd)	5 (5th)	5 (7th)	9 (6th)	14 (4th)	15 (5th)	19 (4th)	19 (5th)	23 (3rd)	28 (3rd)	29 (3rd)	34 (3rd)	39 (2nd)	43 (1st)	43 (3rd)	44 (3rd)	Won	Lost	DNQ
Chiefs	4 (1st)	9 (1st)	13 (1st)	14 (1st)	18 (1st)	22 (1st)	22 (2nd)	26 (1st)	27 (2nd)	32 (1st)	37 (1st)	37 (1st)	41 (1st)	41 (2nd)	46 (1st)	51 (1st)	Lost	Won	Lost
Crusaders	4 (2nd)	4 (8th)	4 (9th)	9 (4th)	14 (2nd)	19 (2nd)	19 (3rd)	24 (2nd)	28 (1st)	32 (2nd)	37 (2nd)	37 (2nd)	37 (3rd)	41 (3rd)	45 (2nd)	49 (2nd)	Won	Won	Won
Drua	1 (8th)	2 (9th)	3 (10th)	7 (8th)	7 (10th)	7 (10th)	7 (11th)	7 (11th)	7 (11th)	11 (11th)	11 (11th)	15 (11th)	15 (11th)	20 (10th)	20 (10th)	20 (10th)	DNQ	DNQ	DNQ
Force	4 (4th)	8 (2nd)	9 (4th)	9 (7th)	9 (8th)	14 (6th)	15 (6th)	20 (4th)	20 (6th)	22 (5th)	22 (6th)	22 (8th)	22 (9th)	22 (9th)	23 (9th)	23 (9th)	DNQ	DNQ	DNQ
Highlanders	1 (7th)	5 (4th)	9 (3rd)	9 (3rd)	10 (6th)	11 (7th)	12 (8th)	12 (9th)	17 (7th)	17 (9th)	17 (10th)	18 (10th)	18 (10th)	19 (11th)	20 (11th)	20 (11th)	DNQ	DNQ	DNQ
Hurricanes	0 (10th)	4 (7th)	5 (6th)	5 (11th)	9 (7th)	9 (8th)	14 (7th)	15 (7th)	16 (8th)	18 (7th)	22 (5th)	26 (5th)	26 (6th)	30 (5th)	34 (4th)	39 (4th)	Lost	DNQ	DNQ
Moana Pasifika	1 (6th)	1 (10th)	2 (11th)	6 (9th)	6 (11th)	6 (11th)	10 (9th)	15 (8th)	15 (10th)	15 (10th)	20 (8th)	24 (6th)	24 (7th)	28 (6th)	28 (6th)	28 (7th)	DNQ	DNQ	DNQ
Reds	0 (9th)	5 (3rd)	9 (2nd)	9 (5th)	14 (3rd)	19 (3rd)	23 (1st)	23 (3rd)	23 (4th)	23 (4th)	27 (4th)	28 (4th)	32 (4th)	32 (4th)	33 (5th)	38 (5th)	Lost	DNQ	DNQ
Waratahs	4 (5th)	4 (6th)	8 (5th)	13 (2nd)	13 (5th)	17 (4th)	17 (5th)	17 (6th)	21 (5th)	21 (6th)	21 (7th)	21 (9th)	22 (8th)	22 (8th)	26 (8th)	26 (8th)	DNQ	DNQ	DNQ
Key:	Win	Draw	Loss	Bye	DNQ = Did not qualify														

== Matches ==
Home \ Away	BLU	BRU	CHI	CRU	DRU	FOR	HIG	HUR	MOA	RED	WAR
Blues	—	20–21	14–25	19–42		40–19		19–18	36–17		46–6
Brumbies		—		31–33	38–21	42–45	34–27	29–35		24–14	40–17
Chiefs	32–31	49–34	—	49–24		56–22	46–10		85–7	27–15	
Crusaders	25–22		19–35	—		55–33	15–12	33–25	29–45	43–19	
Drua	5–34	32–36	28–24	14–31	—	38–7				36–33	28–14
Force		14–33			52–15	—	29–20	17–17	45–44	24–28	17–22
Highlanders	29–21		24–41	10–43	43–20		—	18–20	29–34	23–29	
Hurricanes	29–33		35–17	24–31	38–34		24–20	—	64–12		57–12
Moana Pasifika	27–21	0–24	35–50		34–15		29–31	40–31	—		45–28
Reds	35–21	26–39			52–7	28–24		27–31	56–36	—	35–15
Waratahs		28–23	21–14	33–48	29–24	34–10	37–36			21–28	—

Source: Super Rugby
Legend: Blue = home team win; Yellow = draw; Red = away team win.

== Finals series ==
Qualifying finals
6 June – Christchurch
Crusaders	32
Reds	12
7 June – Hamilton
Chiefs	19
Blues	20
7 June – Canberra
Brumbies	35
Hurricanes	28

Semi-finals
13 June – Christchurch
Crusaders	21
Blues	14
14 June – Hamilton
Chiefs	37
Brumbies	17

Grand Final
21 June – Christchurch
Crusaders	16
Chiefs	12

=== Qualifying finals ===
6 June 2025
19:05 (UTC+12)

Crusaders	32–12	Reds
Try: Scott Barrett 16'; Tamaiti Williams 28'; Noah Hotham 56'; Rivez Reihana 66'; Kyle Preston 79'; Con: Rivez Reihana (2/4) 29', 58'; James O'Connor (0/1); Pen: Rivez Reihana (1/1) 60'; Cards: Ethan Blackadder (yellow card) 69'	Report	Try: Josh Nasser 70'; Fraser McReight 77'; Con: Filipo Daugunu (1/2) 71'

Apollo Projects Stadium, Christchurch
Referee: Paul Williams (New Zealand)

7 June 2025
19:05 (UTC+12)

Chiefs	19–20	Blues
Try: Daniel Rona 59'; Con: Damian McKenzie (1/1) 60'; Pen: Damian McKenzie (4/5) 2', 32', 36', 52'	Report	Try: Kurt Eklund 65'; Josh Beehre 80+3'; Con: Beauden Barrett (2/2) 66', 80+4'; Pen: Beauden Barrett (2/2) 5', 48'; Cards: Ricky Riccitelli (yellow card) 35'

FMG Stadium Waikato, Hamilton
Attendance: 18,067
Referee: Angus Gardner (Australia)

7 June 2025
19:35 (UTC+10)

Brumbies	35–28	Hurricanes
Try: Billy Pollard (2) 9', 40'; Allan Alaalatoa 22'; Tom Wright 47'; James Slipper 60'; Con: Noah Lolesio (5/5) 10', 23', 40+1', 48', 62'	Report	Try: Ruben Love 6'; Fehi Fineanganofo 17'; Bailyn Sullivan 54'; Pasilio Tosi 67'; Con: Ruben Love (4/4) 7', 18', 55', 67'

GIO Stadium, Canberra
Referee: Nic Berry (Australia)

=== Semi-finals ===
13 June 2025
19:05 (UTC+12)

Crusaders	21–14	Blues
Try: Tom Christie 24'; Will Jordan (2) 37', 70'; Con: Rivez Reihana (3/3) 25', 37', 71'; Cards: Braydon Ennor (yellow card) 12'	Report	Try: Mark Tele'a 11'; Rieko Ioane 21'; Con: Beauden Barrett (2/2) 12', 21'; Cards: Josh Fusitua (yellow card) 26'; Hoskins Sotutu (yellow card) 74'

Apollo Projects Stadium, Christchurch
Referee: James Doleman (New Zealand)

14 June 2025
19:05 (UTC+12)

Chiefs	37–17	Brumbies
Try: Emoni Narawa (2) 20', 47'; Josh Jacomb 64'; Con: Damian McKenzie (2/3) 21', 48'; Pen: Damian McKenzie (6/6) 24', 32', 38', 40+2', 55', 58'; Cards: Tupou Vaa'i (yellow card) 8'	Report	Try: Billy Pollard 15'; Corey Toole (2) 35', 44'; Con: Ryan Lonergan (1/3) 16'

FMG Stadium Waikato, Hamilton
Attendance: 14,536
Referee: Nic Berry (Australia)

=== Final ===
21 June 2025
19:05 (UTC+12)

Crusaders	16–12	Chiefs
Try: Codie Taylor 26'; Con: Rivez Reihana (1/1) 27'; Pen: Rivez Reihana (3/4) 29', 35', 73'; Cards: David Havili (yellow card) 12'	Report	Try: George Dyer 13'; Shaun Stevenson 38'; Con: Damian McKenzie (1/2) 14'; Pen: Damian McKenzie (0/1)

Apollo Projects Stadium, Christchurch
Attendance: 17,000
Referee: Angus Gardner (Australia)

== Statistics ==
As of 21 June 2025

=== Leading point scorers ===
No.	Player	Team	Points	Average	Details
1	(New Zealand) Damian McKenzie	(New Zealand) Chiefs	209	14.93	6 T, 49 C, 27 P, 0 D
2	(New Zealand) Beauden Barrett	(New Zealand) Blues	112	8.00	3 T, 35 C, 9 P, 0 D
3	(Australia) Tom Lynagh	(Australia) Reds	104	8.00	4 T, 39 C, 2 P, 0 D
4	(Australia) Ben Donaldson	(Australia) Force	96	7.38	2 T, 34 C, 6 P, 0 D
5	(New Zealand) Sam Gilbert	(New Zealand) Highlanders	89	7.42	5 T, 14 C, 12 P, 0 D
6	(New Zealand) Ruben Love	(New Zealand) Hurricanes	84	7.00	4 T, 23 C, 6 P, 0 D
7	(Tonga) Patrick Pellegrini	(New Zealand) Moana Pasifika	81	6.75	2 T, 28 C, 5 P, 0 D
8	(Fiji) Isaiah Armstrong-Ravula	(Fiji) Drua	75	5.77	1 T, 20 C, 10 P, 0 D
9	(New Zealand) Rivez Reihana	(New Zealand) Crusaders	74	8.22	2 T, 20 C, 8 P, 0 D
10	(Australia) Noah Lolesio	(Australia) Brumbies	69	5.75	0 T, 27 C, 5 P, 0 D

Source: Points

=== Leading try scorers ===
No.	Player	Team	Tries	Average
1	(Australia) Carlo Tizzano	(Australia) Force	13	1.18
2	(Australia) Billy Pollard	(Australia) Brumbies	11	0.73
2	(Australia) Corey Toole	(Australia) Brumbies	11	0.69
4	(New Zealand) Leroy Carter	(New Zealand) Chiefs	9	0.60
4	(New Zealand) Will Jordan	(New Zealand) Crusaders	9	0.64
4	(Australia) Andy Muirhead	(Australia) Brumbies	9	0.56
4	(Tonga) Kyren Taumoefolau	(New Zealand) Moana Pasifika	9	0.75
8	(Australia) Allan Alaalatoa	(Australia) Brumbies	8	0.57
8	(Australia) Lachie Anderson	(Australia) Reds	8	0.53
8	(Samoa) Miracle Faiʻilagi	(New Zealand) Moana Pasifika	8	0.62
8	(Australia) Len Ikitau	(Australia) Brumbies	8	0.57
8	(New Zealand) Kini Naholo	(New Zealand) Hurricanes	8	0.80
8	(New Zealand) Sevu Reece	(New Zealand) Crusaders	8	0.50
8	(New Zealand) Macca Springer	(New Zealand) Crusaders	8	1.00
8	(New Zealand) Bailyn Sullivan	(New Zealand) Hurricanes	8	0.53

Source: Tries

=== Discipline ===
Player	Team	Red	Yellow	Round (vs. opponent)
(New Zealand) Hoskins Sotutu	(New Zealand) Blues	1	1	Round 3 (vs. Hurricanes); Semi-final (vs. Crusaders)
(New Zealand) Daniel Lienert-Brown	(New Zealand) Highlanders	1	0	Round 2 (vs. Blues)
(New Zealand) Mark Tele'a	(New Zealand) Blues	1	0	Round 11 (vs. Reds)
(New Zealand) Sean Withy	(New Zealand) Highlanders	1	0	Round 8 (vs. Force)
(Australia) Tom Hooper	(Australia) Brumbies	0	3	Round 6 (vs. Waratahs); Round 10 (vs. Moana Pasifika); Round 12 (vs. Waratahs)
(Australia) Miles Amatosero	(Australia) Waratahs	0	2	Round 3 (vs. Drua); Round 9 (vs. Chiefs)
(New Zealand) Ethan Blackadder	(New Zealand) Crusaders	0	2	Round 9 (vs. Hurricanes); Qualifying final (vs. Reds)
(Australia) Nick Champion de Crespigny	(Australia) Force	0	2	Round 2 (vs. Brumbies); Round 13 (vs. Brumbies)
(New Zealand) Josh Fusitua	(New Zealand) Blues	0	2	Round 1 (vs. Chiefs); Semi-final (vs. Crusaders)
(Australia) Fraser McReight	(Australia) Reds	0	2	Round 2 (vs. Moana Pasifika); Round 12 (vs. Drua)
(Australia) Hunter Paisami	(Australia) Reds	0	2	Round 2 (vs. Moana Pasifika); Round 14 (vs. Brumbies)
(Australia) Billy Pollard	(Australia) Brumbies	0	2	Round 6 (vs. Waratahs); Round 14 (vs. Reds)
(New Zealand) Reed Prinsep	(Australia) Force	0	2	Round 2 (vs. Brumbies); Round 4 (vs. Waratahs)
(England) Tom Savage	(New Zealand) Moana Pasifika	0	2	Round 4 (vs. Hurricanes); Round 6 (vs. Chiefs)
(New Zealand) Sio Tomkinson	(Australia) Force	0	2	Round 8 (vs. Highlanders); Round 11 (vs. Chiefs)
(Australia) Taniela Tupou	(Australia) Waratahs	0	2	Round 13 (vs. Reds); Round 15 (vs. Force)
(New Zealand) Tupou Vaa'i	(New Zealand) Chiefs	0	2	Round 2 (vs. Crusaders); Semi-final (vs. Brumbies)
(New Zealand) Naitoa Ah Kuoi	(New Zealand) Chiefs	0	1	Round 5 (vs. Blues)
(New Zealand) Scott Barrett	(New Zealand) Crusaders	0	1	Round 1 (vs. Hurricanes)
(Australia) Daniel Botha	(Australia) Waratahs	0	1	Round 13 (vs. Reds)
(Australia) John Bryant	(Australia) Reds	0	1	Round 7 (vs. Force)
(Australia) Josh Canham	(Australia) Reds	0	1	Round 13 (vs. Waratahs)
(New Zealand) Mitchell Dunshea	(New Zealand) Highlanders	0	1	Round 1 (vs. Waratahs)
(New Zealand) Braydon Ennor	(New Zealand) Crusaders	0	1	Semi-final (vs. Blues)
(Australia) Jake Gordon	(Australia) Waratahs	0	1	Round 12 (vs. Brumbies)
(New Zealand) Cullen Grace	(New Zealand) Crusaders	0	1	Round 7 (vs. Moana Pasifika)
(New Zealand) Ethan de Groot	(New Zealand) Highlanders	0	1	Round 6 (vs. Reds)
(New Zealand) David Havili	(New Zealand) Crusaders	0	1	Final (vs. Chiefs)
(Tonga) William Havili	(New Zealand) Moana Pasifika	0	1	Round 12 (vs. Highlanders)
(Australia) Alex Hodgman	(Australia) Reds	0	1	Round 7 (vs. Force)
(New Zealand) Rieko Ioane	(New Zealand) Blues	0	1	Round 3 (vs. Hurricanes)
(New Zealand) Brayden Iose	(New Zealand) Hurricanes	0	1	Round 4 (vs. Moana Pasifika)
(Fiji) Vuate Karawalevu	(Fiji) Drua	0	1	Round 1 (vs. Brumbies)
(Australia) Andrew Kellaway	(Australia) Waratahs	0	1	Round 5 (vs. Reds)
(New Zealand) Du'Plessis Kirifi	(New Zealand) Hurricanes	0	1	Round 2 (vs. Drua)
(Fiji) Simione Kuruvoli	(Fiji) Drua	0	1	Round 9 (vs. Highlanders)
(Fiji) Iosefo Masi	(Fiji) Drua	0	1	Round 16 (vs. Reds)
(New Zealand) Laghlan McWhannell	(New Zealand) Blues	0	1	Round 6 (vs. Crusaders)
(New Zealand) Heremaia Murray	(Australia) Reds	0	1	Round 6 (vs. Highlanders)
(Fiji) Motikai Murray	(Fiji) Drua	0	1	Round 5 (vs. Brumbies)
(Fiji) Jona Nareki	(New Zealand) Highlanders	0	1	Round 8 (vs. Force)
(New Zealand) Xavier Numia	(New Zealand) Hurricanes	0	1	Round 3 (vs. Blues)
(New Zealand) Reuben O'Neill	(New Zealand) Chiefs	0	1	Round 16 (vs. Highlanders)
(New Zealand) Pepesana Patafilo	(New Zealand) Moana Pasifika	0	1	Round 14 (vs. Blues)
(Tonga) Patrick Pellegrini	(New Zealand) Moana Pasifika	0	1	Round 15 (vs. Chiefs)
(Australia) Dylan Pietsch	(Australia) Force	0	1	Round 2 (vs. Brumbies)
(New Zealand) Abraham Pole	(New Zealand) Moana Pasifika	0	1	Round 16 (vs. Hurricanes)
(New Zealand) Ngane Punivai	(New Zealand) Hurricanes	0	1	Round 5 (vs. Highlanders)
(Fiji) Isikeli Rabitu	(Fiji) Drua	0	1	Round 1 (vs. Brumbies)
(New Zealand) Pouri Rakete-Stones	(New Zealand) Hurricanes	0	1	Round 3 (vs. Blues)
(New Zealand) Ricky Riccitelli	(New Zealand) Blues	0	1	Qualifying final (vs. Chiefs)
(Australia) Henry Robertson	(Australia) Force	0	1	Round 14 (vs. Drua)
(Australia) Tom Robertson	(Australia) Force	0	1	Round 1 (vs. Moana Pasifika)
(Fiji) Kitione Salawa Jr.	(Fiji) Drua	0	1	Round 3 (vs. Waratahs)
(New Zealand) Antonio Shalfoon	(New Zealand) Crusaders	0	1	Round 9 (vs. Hurricanes)
(Samoa) Sam Slade	(New Zealand) Moana Pasifika	0	1	Round 15 (vs. Chiefs)
(Australia) Ryan Smith	(Australia) Reds	0	1	Round 2 (vs. Moana Pasifika)
(New Zealand) Shaun Stevenson	(New Zealand) Chiefs	0	1	Round 12 (vs. Hurricanes)
(Australia) Joseph Sua'ali'i	(Australia) Waratahs	0	1	Round 10 (vs. Drua)
(New Zealand) Xavi Taele	(New Zealand) Blues	0	1	Round 5 (vs. Chiefs)
(New Zealand) Caleb Tangitau	(New Zealand) Highlanders	0	1	Round 1 (vs. Waratahs)
(Australia) Tiaan Tauakipulu	(Australia) Force	0	1	Round 15 (vs. Waratahs)
(Fiji) Timoci Tavatavanawai	(New Zealand) Highlanders	0	1	Round 14 (vs. Hurricanes)
(New Zealand) Codie Taylor	(New Zealand) Crusaders	0	1	Round 11 (vs. Highlanders)
(Australia) Corey Toole	(Australia) Brumbies	0	1	Round 7 (vs. Highlanders)
(Samoa) Jeffery Toomaga-Allen	(Australia) Reds	0	1	Round 8 (vs. Chiefs)
(Australia) Tuaina Taii Tualima	(Australia) Brumbies	0	1	Round 11 (vs. Hurricanes)
(New Zealand) Will Tucker	(New Zealand) Hurricanes	0	1	Round 2 (vs. Drua)
(New Zealand) Tito Tuipulotu	(New Zealand) Moana Pasifika	0	1	Round 14 (vs. Blues)
(New Zealand) Patrick Tuipulotu	(New Zealand) Blues	0	1	Round 8 (vs. Hurricanes)
(New Zealand) Isaia Walker-Leawere	(New Zealand) Hurricanes	0	1	Round 4 (vs. Moana Pasifika)
(Australia) Joey Walton	(Australia) Waratahs	0	1	Round 7 (vs. Hurricanes)
(Fiji) Etonia Waqa	(Fiji) Drua	0	1	Round 16 (vs. Reds)
(Australia) Jeremy Williams	(Australia) Force	0	1	Round 2 (vs. Brumbies)
(New Zealand) Gideon Wrampling	(New Zealand) Chiefs	0	1	Round 9 (vs. Waratahs)
(Australia) Tom Wright	(Australia) Brumbies	0	1	Round 10 (vs. Moana Pasifika)

== Awards ==
=== Player of the Year ===
Player of the Year Award
Player	Points	Position	Team	Winner
Langi Gleeson	26	Loose forward	Waratahs	Ardie Savea (Moana Pasifika)
Tom Hooper	31	Loose forward	Brumbies	Ardie Savea (Moana Pasifika)
Damian McKenzie	28	First five-eighth	Chiefs	Ardie Savea (Moana Pasifika)
Fraser McReight	26	Loose forward	Reds	Ardie Savea (Moana Pasifika)
Ardie Savea	42	Loose forward	Moana Pasifika	Ardie Savea (Moana Pasifika)
Timoci Tavatavanawai	26	Midfielder	Highlanders	Ardie Savea (Moana Pasifika)

=== Team of the Year ===
Team of the Year (honorary)
Pos.	Player	Votes
1	Angus Bell (Waratahs)	14
2	Tevita Ikanivere (Drua)	19
3	Allan Alaalatoa (Brumbies)	20
4	Jeremy Williams (Force)	21
5	Patrick Tuipulotu (Blues)	20
BR	Tom Hooper (Brumbies)	31
BR	Fraser McReight (Reds)	29
BR	Carlo Tizzano (Force)	29
BR	Ardie Savea (Moana Pasifika)	46
9	Cam Roigard (Hurricanes)	28
10	Damian McKenzie (Chiefs)	36
11	Kini Naholo (Hurricanes)	18
12	Timoci Tavatavanawai (Highlanders)	32
13	AJ Lam (Blues)	14
14	Harry Potter (Force)	18
15	Joseph Sua'ali'i (Waratahs)	20

== Players ==
=== Squads ===
The following squads have been named. Players listed in italics denote non-original squad members:

Blues squad
Forwards	Josh Beehre • Adrian Choat • Cam Christie • Che Clark • Tristyn Cook • Kurt Eklund • Josh Fusitua • Bryn Gordon • Jordan Lay • Laghlan McWhannell • James Mullan • Dalton Papali'i • Nathaniel Pole • Marcel Renata • Ricky Riccitelli • Anton Segner • PJ Sheck • Hoskins Sotutu • Cameron Suafoa • Angus Taʻavao • Hamdahn Tuipulotu • Patrick Tuipulotu • Mason Tupaea • Ofa Tuʻungafasi • Did not play • Ben Ake • Sam Darry
Backs	Beauden Barrett • Finlay Christie • Caleb Clarke • Corey Evans • Cole Forbes • Taufa Funaki • Rieko Ioane • AJ Lam • Sam Nock • Stephen Perofeta • Harry Plummer • Zarn Sullivan • Xavi Taele • Mark Tele'a • Did not play • Meihana Grindlay • Reon Paul • Payton Spencer
Coach	Vern Cotter

Brumbies squad
Forwards	Allan Alaalatoa • Liam Bowron • Charlie Cale • Feao Fotuaika • Nick Frost • Tom Hooper • Lington Ieli • Lachlan Lonergan • Cadeyrn Neville • Billy Pollard • Luke Reimer • Judah Saumaisue • Blake Schoupp • Rory Scott • Lachlan Shaw • James Slipper • Tuaina Taii Tualima • Rob Valetini • Rhys van Nek • Did not play • Tevita Alatini • Lachlan Hooper • Harry Vella
Backs	Austin Anderson • Hudson Creighton • Jack Debreczeni • David Feliuai • Harrison Goddard • Len Ikitau • Noah Lolesio • Ryan Lonergan • Declan Meredith • Andy Muirhead • Kadin Pritchard • Ollie Sapsford • Klayton Thorn • Corey Toole • Tom Wright • Did not play • Ben O'Donnell • Shane Wilcox
Coach	Stephen Larkham

Chiefs squad
Forwards	Naitoa Ah Kuoi • Sione Ahio • Kaylum Boshier • Jahrome Brown • George Dyer • Samipeni Finau • Luke Jacobson • Josh Lord • Brodie McAlister • Ollie Norris • Reuben O'Neill • Simon Parker • Jared Proffit • Aidan Ross • Manaaki Selby-Rickit • Wallace Sititi • Bradley Slater • Samisoni Taukei'aho • James Thompson • Jimmy Tupou • Tupou Vaa'i • Malachi Wrampling-Alec • Did not play • Fiti Sa
Backs	Leroy Carter • Josh Jacomb • Anton Lienert-Brown • Manasa Mataele • Damian McKenzie • Etene Nanai-Seturo • Emoni Narawa • Rameka Poihipi • Cortez Ratima • Xavier Roe • Daniel Rona • Shaun Stevenson • Te Toiroa Tahuriorangi • Kaleb Trask • Quinn Tupaea • Gideon Wrampling • Did not play • Liam Coombes-Fabling
Coach	Clayton McMillan

Crusaders squad
Forwards	Fletcher Anderson • Scott Barrett • George Bell • Ethan Blackadder • George Bower • Tahlor Cahill • Seb Calder • Tom Christie • Cullen Grace • Jamie Hannah • Corey Kellow • Manumaua Letiu • Christian Lio-Willie • Sam Matenga • Ioane Moananu • Matt Moulds • Fletcher Newell • Lewis Ponini • Xavier Saifoloi • Antonio Shalfoon • Quinten Strange • Kershawl Sykes-Martin • Codie Taylor • Tamaiti Williams • Did not play • Finlay Brewis • Dominic Gardiner
Backs	Levi Aumua • Mitchell Drummond • Braydon Ennor • Chay Fihaki • David Havili • Noah Hotham • Will Jordan • Taha Kemara • Dallas McLeod • Johnny McNicholl • James O'Connor • Kyle Preston • Sevu Reece • Rivez Reihana • Macca Springer • Aki Tuivailala
Coach	Rob Penney

Drua squad
Forwards	Elia Canakaivata • Meli Derenalagi • Mesake Doge • Mesu Dolokoto • Haereiti Hetet • Tevita Ikanivere • Vilive Miramira • Motikai Murray • Isoa Nasilasila • Livai Natave • Peni Ravai • Ratu Leone Rotuisolia • Kitione Salawa Jr. • Joseva Tamani • Samu Tawake • Zuriel Togiatama • Meli Tuni • Emosi Tuqiri • Isoa Tuwai • Mesake Vocevoce • Sailosi Vukalokalo • Etonia Waqa • Did not play • Te Ahiwaru Cirikidaveta
Backs	Isaiah Armstrong-Ravula • Philip Baselala • Ilaisa Droasese • Vuate Karawalevu • Simione Kuruvoli • Ponepati Loganimasi • Frank Lomani • Iosefo Masi • Ratu Peni Matawalu • Caleb Muntz • Leone Nawai • Isikeli Rabitu • Taniela Rakuro • Junior Ratuva • Selestino Ravutaumada • Tuidraki Samusamuvodre • Inia Tabuavou • Kemu Valetini • Did not play • Epeli Momo • Waqa Nalaga
Coach	Glen Jackson

Force squad
Forwards	Albert Alcock • Sam Carter • Nick Champion de Crespigny • Ryan Coxon • Nic Dolly • Vaiolini Ekuasi • Lopeti Faifua • Will Harris • Tom Horton • Kane Koteka • Atu Moli • Titi Nofoagatotoa • Fatongia Paea • Brandon Paenga-Amosa • Marley Pearce • Reed Prinsep • Tom Robertson • Joshua Smith • Darcy Swain • Tiaan Tauakipulu • Josh Thompson • Carlo Tizzano • Jeremy Williams • Did not play • Harry Hoopert • Harry Johnson-Holmes • Tom Osborne • Papillon Sevele • Mitch Watts
Backs	Kurtley Beale • Max Burey • Ben Donaldson • Issak Fines-Leleiwasa • Mac Grealy • Alex Harford • Bayley Kuenzle • Coby Miln • Divad Palu • Reesjan Pasitoa • Doug Philipson • Dylan Pietsch • George Poolman • Harry Potter • Henry Robertson • Hamish Stewart • Sio Tomkinson • Nic White • Did not play • Ronan Leahy • Matt Proctor
Coach	Simon Cron

Highlanders squad
Forwards	Josh Bartlett • Henry Bell • Nikora Broughton • Tai Cribb • Ethan de Groot • Mitchell Dunshea • Oliver Haig • Fabian Holland • TK Howden • Sefo Kautai • Veveni Lasaqa • Daniel Lienert-Brown • Michael Loft • Saula Ma'u • Lui Naeata • Hugh Renton • Will Stodart • Jack Taylor • Soane Vikena • Sean Withy • Did not play • Hayden Michaels • Rohan Wingham
Backs	James Arscott • Folau Fakatava • Ajay Faleafaga • Taniela Filimone • Sam Gilbert • Nathan Hastie • Finn Hurley • Adam Lennox • Jonah Lowe • Michael Manson • Cam Millar • Jona Nareki • Jacob Ratumaitavuki-Kneepkens • Taine Robinson • Caleb Tangitau • Timoci Tavatavanawai • Jake Te Hiwi • Tanielu Teleʻa • Thomas Umaga-Jensen • Josh Whaanga
Coach	Jamie Joseph

Hurricanes squad
Forwards	Asafo Aumua • Caleb Delany • Jacob Devery • Devan Flanders • Zach Gallagher • Brayden Iose • Du'Plessis Kirifi • Peter Lakai • Siale Lauaki • Tyrel Lomax • Tevita Mafileo • Xavier Numia • Hugo Plummer • Pouri Rakete-Stones • Brad Shields • Nic Souchon • Pasilio Tosi • Will Tucker • Raymond Tuputupu • Isaia Walker-Leawere • Did not play • Tom Allen • Arese Poliko • Josh Taula
Backs	Kade Banks • Brett Cameron • Tjay Clarke • Ere Enari • Fehi Fineanganofo • Harry Godfrey • Callum Harkin • Riley Higgins • Riley Hohepa • Ruben Love • Kini Naholo • Billy Proctor • Ngane Punivai • Cam Roigard • Jone Rova • Daniel Sinkinson • Bailyn Sullivan • Peter Umaga-Jensen • Jordi Viljoen • Did not play • Lucas Cashmore
Coach	Clark Laidlaw

Moana Pasifika squad
Forwards	Chris Apoua • Allan Craig • Michael Curry • Pone Fa'amausili • Miracle Faiʻilagi • Sione Havili Talitui • Lotu Inisi • James Lay • Sione Mafileo • Tomasi Maka • Sama Malolo • Monu Moli • Sam Moli • Alamanda Motuga • Semisi Paea • Abraham Pole • Feleti Sae-Taʻufoʻou • Mills Sanerivi • Tom Savage • Ardie Savea • Sam Slade • Ofa Tauatevalu • Ola Tauelangi • Tito Tuipulotu • Semisi Tupou Ta'eiloa • Did not play • Irie Papuni
Backs	Solomon Alaimalo • Losi Filipo • Jackson Garden-Bachop • Aisea Halo • William Havili • Fine Inisi • Lalomilo Lalomilo • Melani Matavao • Tevita Ofa • Pepesana Patafilo • Patrick Pellegrini • Julian Savea • Jonathan Taumateine • Kyren Taumoefolau • Danny Toala • Tuna Tuitama • Did not play • Neria Fomai
Coach	Tana Umaga

Reds squad
Forwards	Richie Asiata • George Blake • Nick Bloomfield • Angus Blyth • Joe Brial • John Bryant • Josh Canham • Max Craig • Massimo de Lutiis • Sef Fa'agase • Matt Faessler • Alex Hodgman • Fraser McReight • Josh Nasser • Zane Nonggorr • Lukhan Salakaia-Loto • Ryan Smith • Jeffery Toomaga-Allen • Seru Uru • Connor Vest • Harry Wilson • Liam Wright • Did not play • Matt Gibbon • Trevor King
Backs	Lachie Anderson • Jock Campbell • Filipo Daugunu • Josh Flook • Jude Gibbs • Frankie Goldsbrough • Tom Lynagh • Tate McDermott • Harry McLaughlin-Phillips • Heremaia Murray • Hunter Paisami • Dre Pakeho • Tim Ryan • Kalani Thomas • Louis Werchon • Did not play • Matt Brice • Mason Gordon • Isaac Henry • Will McCulloch
Coach	Les Kiss

Waratahs squad
Forwards	Jamie Adamson • Miles Amatosero • Siosifa Amone • Angus Bell • Daniel Botha • Ethan Dobbins • Charlie Gamble • Langi Gleeson • Ben Grant • Julian Heaven • Isaac Aedo Kailea • Felix Kalapu • Tom Lambert • Fergus Lee-Warner • Rob Leota • Dave Porecki • Hugh Sinclair • Leafi Talataina • Taniela Tupou • Mahe Vailanu • Did not play • Ale Aho • Brad Amituanai • Jack Barrett • Adrian Brown • Clem Halaholo • Mesu Kunavula • Angelo Smith
Backs	Jack Bowen • Lawson Creighton • Tane Edmed • Lalakai Foketi • Jake Gordon • Jack Grant • Max Jorgensen • Andrew Kellaway • Darby Lancaster • Henry O'Donnell • Triston Reilly • Archie Saunders • Joseph Sua'ali'i • Joey Walton • Teddy Wilson • Did not play • James Hendren • Michael McDonald • Lukas Ripley • Jackson Ropata
Coach	Dan McKellar

== Referees ==
The following referees were selected to officiate the 2025 Super Rugby Pacific season:

2025 Super Rugby Pacific referees
Australia	Nic Berry • Angus Gardner • Damon Murphy • Jordan Way
New Zealand	James Doleman • Angus Mabey • Ben O'Keeffe • Todd Petrie • Marcus Playle • Paul Williams

== See also ==
- 2025 Super Rugby Women's season
- 2025 Super Rugby Aupiki season
