= Lawson Creighton =

Australian rugby union player

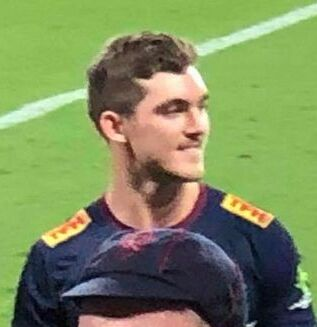
- Creighton with the Reds in 2024
- Born: 21 July 1998 (age 28) Brisbane, Queensland, Australia
- Height: 185 cm (6 ft 1 in)
- Weight: 90 kg (198 lb; 14 st 2 lb)
- School: Padua College
- Notable relative: Hudson Creighton (brother)

Rugby union career
- Position(s): Fly-half, Centre, Fullback
- Current team: Ospreys
Amateur team(s)
Years	Team	Apps	(Points)
2019–2024	Brothers		
2025–2026	Randwick		
Senior career
Years	Team	Apps	(Points)
2018–2019	Brisbane City	7	(0)
2021–2024	Reds	35	(129)
2025–2026	Waratahs	22	(60)
2026–	Ospreys	0	(0)
- Correct as of 15 June 2026
International career
Years	Team	Apps	(Points)
2018	Australia U20	3	(0)
- Correct as of 15 June 2026

Lawson Creighton (born 21 July 1998) is an Australian rugby union player who currently plays for the Ospreys in the United Rugby Championship (URC). His playing position is fly-half, but he can also play centre, wing and fullback.

== Early life and youth career ==
Creighton was born in Brisbane, Queensland, Australia and educated at Padua College, in the Brisbane suburb of Kedron. He is the brother of professional rugby union player Hudson Creighton. In his youth, Creighton played for the Norths Junior Rugby Club, and later played for the Brothers Rugby Club in the Queensland Premier Rugby.

== Career ==
=== Reds ===
Creighton was named in the Reds squad for the 2021 Super Rugby AU season, Having initially been named in their squad ahead of the 2020 Super Rugby season that was cut short due to the COVID-19 pandemic. He previously represented the Brisbane City in the 2018 and 2019 National Rugby Championship.

Creighton made his Reds debut in the 2021 Super Rugby AU season. In 2022, Creighton played in fifteen matches across the season for the Reds, making his first start at No. 10 (replacing injured James O'Connor) against the Hurricanes in round ten. He scored seven points for the Reds as they hit a 17–0 lead. However, they lost 30–17 as Creighton finished out the game.

Creighton started on the bench in the first round of the 2023 season, replacing winger Filipo Daugunu in the 70th minute against the Hurricanes in Townsville. Creighton was replaced by rookie Tom Lynagh between rounds two and six, finally returning to the Reds in their seventh round, Rod Macqueen Cup clash against the ACT Brumbies. Creighton started in six of his remaining nine Super Rugby matches for the season, including the Reds' 25–22 victory in round twelve against the Chiefs at Yarrow Stadium, New Plymouth, which saw them end a 21-game, 10-year drought in New Zealand. Nine Network's Michael Atkinson praised Creighton's performances during this spell, writing in The Sydney Morning Herald: "Lawson Creighton has proven he's got the mettle to lead a provincial team around – helping the Reds to wins over Moana Pasifika, Western Force and the Chiefs in recent weeks."

=== Waratahs ===
In late 2024, Creighton was announced as a new singing for rival team the Waratahs on a two-year deal ahead of the 2025 season. At the time of his transfer, Creighton had failed to seal his position as the first-team fly-half, being oscillating in the fly-half position with Tom Lynagh. Upon signing for the Waratahs, Creighton stated to Nine.com.au: "It's tough to leave close mates I've come through the local pathways with but those friendships don't change... I leave with only good memories. I feel I'll get the opportunity for more minutes where I'm heading and I'm ready for new challenges."

Creighton started, and played, in ten matches for the Waratahs in the 2025 season, being the more preferred No. 10 choice by coach Dan McKellar. The Waratahs' halfback depth was cited later in the season, following the departure of backup fly-half Tane Edmed, as lacking depth, with the fly-halves ranks consisting of Creighton, Tane Edmed, and Jack Bowen. The Waratahs started the season well, winning their first three games in a row, the first time they had done so in 16 years. Despite achieving just one win since the fourth round, Creighton lead the Waratahs to a upset win against the Chiefs in round nine to keep their finals hopes intact. Creighton scored a try assist in what became a 102-metre try that put their 2025 home record to 5–0. Ahead of round fifteen, Creighton was moved to fullback, the first time in his Super Rugby career.

Ahead of the 2026 season, former Australia coach John Connolly stated to The Sydney Morning Herald that he believed Creighton should've been given a chance to become Australia's first-choice fly-half by the 2027 Rugby World Cup, played on home soil.

Throughout the 2026 season, Creighton became one of the Waratahs' most trusted backline options, featuring across multiple positions but primarily remaining part of the team's solution at five-eighth. While his versatility and aerial ability were praised, his overall quality to fill the fly-half role was criticised. The Sydney Morning Herald's Paul Cully described Creighton as a reliable and effective operator whose strengths lay in his toughness and decision-making, though he argued the Waratahs still lacked a top-tier No. 10. Creighton himself maintained that five-eighth was his preferred role and expressed ambitions of establishing himself as both the Waratahs' first-choice No. 10 and a future Wallaby.

=== Ospreys ===
At the end of the 2026 Super Rugby season, Creighton was reported to be off-contract, although it was stated that he was expected to stay at the club. In June 2026, BBC Sport reported that the Ospreys team in Wales were interested in signing Creighton. The club had had signed several Australian players throughout the 2025 and 2026 off-seasons, including Ryan Smith, Liam Wright, and Lalakai Foketi.

On 16 June 2026, the Ospreys announced the signing of Creighton ahead of their 2026–27 season.
