= Mac Grealy =

Australian rugby union player

- Full name: Maconal Grealy
- Born: 6 March 2002 (age 24) Toowoomba, Queensland, Australia
- Height: 180 cm (5 ft 11 in)
- Weight: 89 kg (196 lb; 14 st 0 lb)
- School: Downlands College

Rugby union career
- Position(s): Fullback, Wing
Youth career
- Souths Kookaburras Toowoomba
Amateur team(s)
Years	Team	Apps	(Points)
- University of Queensland
Super Rugby
Years	Team	Apps	(Points)
2021–2024	Reds	29	(0)
2025–	Western Force	26	(40)
International career
Years	Team	Apps	(Points)
- Australian Schoolboys
2022	Australia U20	3	(10)

Maconal Grealy (born 6 March 2002), known as Mac, is an Australian rugby union player who plays for the Western Force in the Super Rugby. He previously played for the Queensland Reds in the same competition, making his professional debut for the team in the 2021 Super Rugby Trans-Tasman. His playing position is wing or fullback.

== Career ==
Grealy was born in Toowoomba in Queensland's Darling Downs region, Australia. He attended Downlands College and played junior rugby for the Souths Kookaburras Toowoomba.

Grealy was part of the Downlands College first XV and represented for the Australian Schoolboys team. His first professional contract had him named in the Reds squad for the 2021 Super Rugby AU season. He made his debut for the Reds in Round 4 of the Super Rugby Trans-Tasman competition against the Blues, starting at fullback as a late replacement for Bryce Hegarty.

He signed a two-year contract with Perth-based Super Rugby rivals, the Western Force, in October 2024. He made his debut for the team in the first round of the 2025 season against the Moana Pasifika, starting at fullback. Grealy scored a try in the Force's one-point home victory. Grealy went on to play in every fixture for the Force in 2025. Between rounds twelve and fourteen, Grealy was moved from his usual position of fullback (No. 15) to the left wing (No. 11) to make way for Australian rugby veteran Kurtley Beale, whom returned from an achilles tendon injury. Overall, Grealy's 2025 season was one of his best to date, scoring six tries, the third-highest for the team.
