= Matt Brice =

Australian rugby union player

- Born: Amamoor, Australia
- Height: 195 cm (6 ft 5 in)
- School: Good Shepherd Lutheran College; Nelson College

Rugby union career
- Position: Wing
- Current team: Reds
Senior career
Years	Team	Apps	(Points)
2025–	Reds		(0)
- Correct as of 29 March 2025

Matt Brice is an Australian rugby union player, who plays for the Reds. His preferred position is wing.

== Early career ==
Brice is from Amamoor in Queensland and attended Good Shepherd Lutheran College however moved to New Zealand in 2019 to attended Nelson College where he played rugby. After returning from New Zealand, he played for Noosa Dolphins and the University of Queensland in club rugby, where after being spotted in the Queensland Country pathway he was called into the Reds academy.

== Professional career ==
Brice was named in the Reds touring squad of Japan in November 2024. He was called into the Reds squad as a late inclusion in Round 7 of the 2025 Super Rugby Pacific season for the match against the Force, but he did not take the field.
