= Josh Thompson (rugby union) =

Fijian rugby union player (born 2000)

- Born: 8 December 2000 (age 25) Suva, Fiji
- Height: 196 cm (6 ft 5 in)
- Weight: 118 kg (260 lb)

Rugby union career
- Position: Lock / Flanker
- Current team: FC Grenoble
Senior career
Years	Team	Apps	(Points)
2025	Force FC Grenoble	3 14	(0)
- Correct as of 21 May 2025
- Correct as of 3 July 2026

Josh Thompson (born 8 December 2000) is a Fijian rugby union player, who plays for FC Grenoble Rugby. His preferred position is lock or flanker.

In 2023, Thompson played for West Harbour Rugby Union before being selected by the Western Force to tour South Africa for the Toyota Challenge series against the Toyota Cheetahs. During the tour, he made his unofficial debut for the Western Force. However, he suffered an injury during a training session in South Africa that caused him to miss the majority of the 2024 season.

Thompson was selected once again in 2024 to tour South Africa with the Western Force, featuring in matches against the Toyota Cheetahs and Western Province XV.

In 2025, Thompson made his official Super Rugby debut for the Western Force against the Waratahs. He went on to make two further appearances during the season, playing against the Crusaders and the Blues before signing with FC Grenoble Rugby in France’s Pro D2 competition..

== Professional career ==
Thompson signed for the Western Force in August 2024, before in November 2024 being named in the squad for the 2025 Super Rugby Pacific season. He made his debut for the Force in Round 4 of the season, coming on as a replacement against the Waratahs.
