= Marcus Playle =

New Zealand rugby union referee

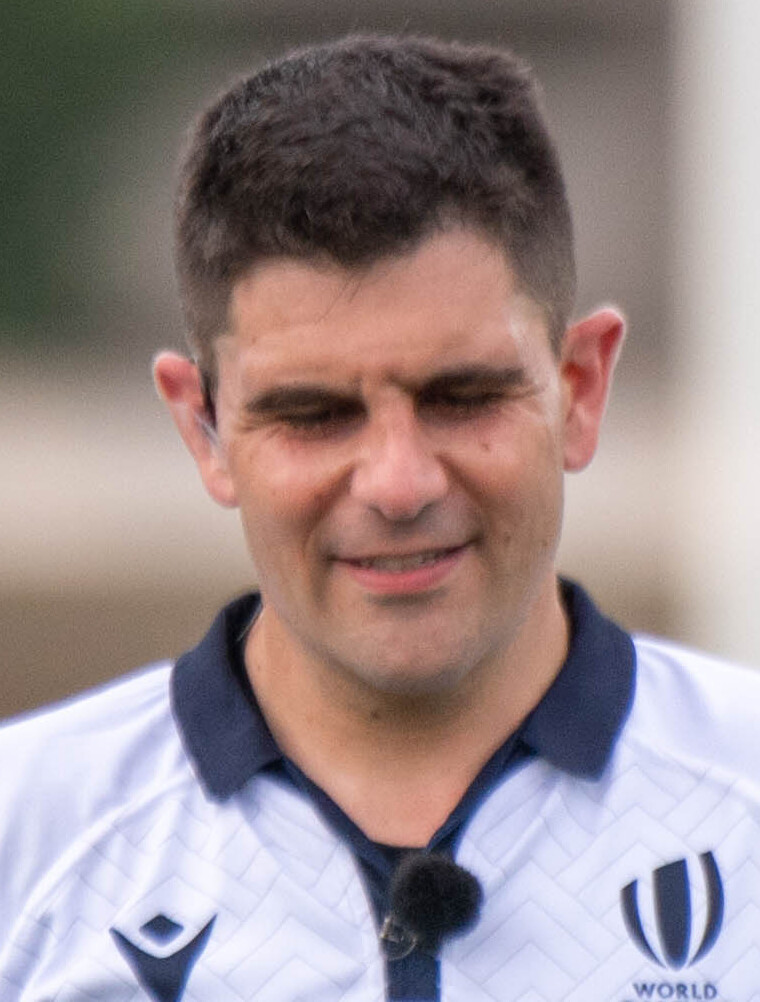
- Born: Marcus Playle Auckland, New Zealand

Rugby union career
Refereeing career
Years	Competition	Apps
2021–pres.	National Provincial Championship	
2022	Major League Rugby	
2024–2025	Japan Rugby League One	
2025–pres.	Super Rugby	
- Correct as of 8 March 2025

Marcus Playle is a New Zealand professional rugby union referee.

== Refereeing career ==
Playle has been refereeing professional rugby since 2021, when he first refereed in the National Provincial Championship competition, while working as a trained lawyer professionally. In 2022 he refereed in the Major League Rugby competition in America, and Japan Rugby League One in 2024 and 2025. Playle refereed his first Super Rugby game during Round 4 of the 2025 Super Rugby Pacific season, refereeing the match between Moana Pasifika and the Hurricanes.
