= Semisi Tupou Ta'eiloa =

New Zealand rugby union player

- Born: 25 November 2003 (age 22) Mangere, New Zealand
- Height: 185 cm (6 ft 1 in)
- Weight: 113 kg (249 lb; 17 st 11 lb)
- School: Otago Boys' High School

Rugby union career
- Position: Flanker / number 8
- Current team: Southland
Senior career
Years	Team	Apps	(Points)
2023–	Southland	28	(30)
2025–2026	Moana Pasifika	21	(50)
- Correct as of 26 April 2026

Semisi Tupou Ta'eiloa (born 25 November 2003) is a New Zealand rugby union player, who plays for Southland. His preferred position is flanker or number 8.

== Early career ==
Tupou Ta'eiloa attended Otago Boys' High School where he earned selection for the Otago academy and New Zealand U19.

In 2023, he was charged with drink driving, but escaped conviction.

== Professional career ==
Tupou Ta'eiloa has represented Southland in the National Provincial Championship since 2023, being named in their squad for the 2024 Bunnings NPC. He was called into the Moana Pasifika squad ahead of Round 1 of the 2025 Super Rugby Pacific season, making his debut against the Force.
