= Feleti Sae-Taʻufoʻou =

New Zealand rugby union player (born 2002)

Feleti Sae-Ta'ufo'ou
- Born: 17 June 2002 (age 24) New Zealand
- Height: 190 cm (6 ft 3 in)
- Weight: 112 kg (247 lb; 17 st 9 lb)
- School: Palmerston North Boys' High School

Rugby union career
- Position: Prop
- Current team: Manawatu
Senior career
Years	Team	Apps	(Points)
2023–	Manawatu	8	(0)
2025–2026	Moana Pasifika	1	(0)
- Correct as of 16 February 2025

Feleti Sae-Ta'ufo'ou (born 17 June 2002) is a New Zealand rugby union player, who plays for Manawatu. His preferred position is prop.

== Early career ==
Sae-Ta'ufo'ou attended Palmerston North Boys' High School where he earned selection for the inaugural Hurricanes U20 squad. He was a member of the Manawatu academy.

== Professional career ==
Sae-Ta'ufo'ou has represented Manawatu in the National Provincial Championship since 2023, being named in their squad for the 2024 Bunnings NPC. He was called into the Moana Pasifika squad ahead of Round 1 of the 2025 Super Rugby Pacific season, making his debut against the Force.
