= Tito Tuipulotu =

New Zealand rugby union player

- Born: 8 June 2002 (age 24) New Zealand
- School: St Peter's College, Auckland
- Notable relative: Patrick Tuipulotu (brother)

Rugby union career
- Position: Prop
- Current team: Auckland
Senior career
Years	Team	Apps	(Points)
2024–	Auckland	3	(0)
2025–2026	Moana Pasifika	0	(0)
- Correct as of 10 December 2024

Tito Tuipulotu (born 8 June 2002) is a New Zealand rugby union player, who plays for Auckland. His preferred position is prop.

== Early career ==
Tuipulotu attended St Peter's College, Auckland where he captained the school team. He plays his club rugby for Ponsonby. He is the youngest of three professional rugby brothers, with eldest Patrick representing the All Blacks and Hamdahn playing at provincial level.

== Professional career ==
Tuipulotu has represented Auckland in the National Provincial Championship since 2024, being named as a replacement player in the squad for the 2024 Bunnings NPC. He was named in the Moana Pasifika squad for the 2025 Super Rugby Pacific season in November 2024. On 26 October 2026 he was announced as part of the 2027 Super League Squad for the Hurricanes
