= Hudson Creighton =

Australian rugby union player

- Born: March 21, 2000 (age 26) Australia
- Height: 182 cm (6 ft 0 in)
- Weight: 90 kg (198 lb; 14 st 2 lb)
- Notable relative: Lawson Creighton (brother)

Rugby union career
- Position(s): Centre, Wing
- Current team: Brumbies
Senior career
Years	Team	Apps	(Points)
2021	Reds	1	(0)
2022–2026	Brumbies	30	(25)
2024	Otago	9	(20)
2026-	Northland	2	(5)
- Correct as of 8 August 2026

Hudson Creighton is an Australian rugby union player who plays for the Brumbies} in Super Rugby. His playing position is centre. He was named in the Reds squad for the 2021 Super Rugby AU season. He made his debut for the Reds in Round 5 of the Super Rugby Trans-Tasman competition against the Hurricanes, coming on as a replacement.
