= Judah Saumaisue =

Australian rugby union player

- Full name: Judah Qoro Saumaisue
- Born: 11 March 2004 (age 22) Melbourne, Australia
- Height: 191 cm (6 ft 3 in)
- Weight: 113 kg (249 lb; 17 st 11 lb)

Rugby union career
- Position: Lock / Flanker
- Current team: Brumbies
Senior career
| Years | Team | Apps | (Points) |
| 2024 | Rebels | 0 | (0) |
| 2025–2026 | Brumbies | 3 | (5) |
- Correct as of 14 June 2025
International career
| Years | Team | Apps | (Points) |
| 2023 | Fiji U20 | 5 | (0) |
- Correct as of 16 February 2025

Judah Saumaisue (born 11 March 2004) is an Australian rugby union player, who plays for the Brumbies. His preferred position is lock or flanker.

== Early career ==
Saumaisue was born in Melbourne, however he has Fijian heritage from Gau Island. He represented Fiji U20 in 2023, and Australia U20 in 2024. Having come through the Melbourne Rebels system, having captained their U19 side, he played his club rugby for Power House, he also represented the Fijian Drua U20 side.

== Professional career ==
Saumaisue was named in the Rebels development squad for the 2024 Super Rugby Pacific season, however did not make an appearance. Following the Rebels collapse, Saumaisue moved to the Brumbies on trial ahead of the 2025 Super Rugby Pacific season, being named in the squad for Round 1 of the 2025 Super Rugby Pacific season, debuting against the Drua.
