= Archie Saunders =

Australian rugby union player

- Born: 30 January 2004 (age 22) Australia
- Height: 192 cm (6 ft 4 in)
- Weight: 98 kg (216 lb; 15 st 6 lb)
- School: Knox Grammar School

Rugby union career
- Position: Wing
- Current team: Waratahs
Senior career
Years	Team	Apps	(Points)
2025–	Waratahs	1	(5)
- Correct as of 29 March 2025
International career
Years	Team	Apps	(Points)
2024	Australia U20	4	(5)
- Correct as of 29 March 2025

Archie Saunders (born 30 January 2004) is an Australian rugby union player, who plays for the Waratahs. His preferred position is wing.

== Early career ==
Saunders attended St Pauls Catholic College, Manly and Knox Grammar School where he played rugby but also competed in athletics as a sprinter (running 100metres in 10.3 seconds), being coached by former Olympian Melinda Gainsford-Taylor, before focusing on rugby. He plays his club rugby for Warringah and earned selection for Australia U20 in 2024.

== Professional career ==
Saunders was named in the Waratahs squad ahead of the 2025 Super Rugby Pacific season. He was named to make his debut for the Waratahs in Round 7 of the season against the Hurricanes, scoring a try.
