= Jude Gibbs =

Australian rugby union player

- Born: 7 February 2001 (age 25) Australia
- Height: 182 cm (6 ft 0 in)
- Weight: 88 kg (194 lb)
- School: St Joseph's College, Hunters Hill

Rugby union career
- Position: Fly-half / Fullback
- Current team: Kyuden Voltex
Senior career
| Years | Team | Apps | (Points) |
| 2025 | Reds | 1 | (2) |
| 2025- | Kyuden Voltex | 9 | (58) |
- Correct as of 12 April 2025

Jude Gibbs is an Australian rugby union player, who plays for the Reds. His preferred position is fly-half or fullback.

== Early career ==
Gibbs attended St Joseph's College, Hunters Hill and represented the Australian Schools Barbarians side in 2019. He originally played his club rugby for Sydney University, before transferring to join Northern Suburbs.

== Professional career ==
Gibbs was named in the Reds squad for the 2025 Super Rugby Pacific season. He was called into the side for the Round 9 fixture against the Brumbies, coming on as a replacement to make his debut.
