= Heremaia Murray =

New Zealand rugby union player

- Full name: Heremaia W.W. Murray
- Born: 11 January 2000 (age 26) New Zealand
- Height: 188 cm (6 ft 2 in)
- Weight: 94 kg (207 lb; 14 st 11 lb)
- School: Auckland Grammar School

Rugby union career
- Position: Wing
- Current team: Northland, Reds
Senior career
Years	Team	Apps	(Points)
2021	Auckland	1	(0)
2022–	Northland	31	(75)
2024	Crusaders	3	(0)
2025–	Reds	10	(10)
- Correct as of 6 June 2025

Heremaia Murray (born 11 January 2000) is a New Zealand rugby union player, who currently plays as a wing for the Reds in Super Rugby and Northland in New Zealand's National Provincial Championship.

== Early career ==
Murray grew up in Te Hāpua and Ahipara in the Northland Region in the far North of New Zealand. He received his secondary school education at Auckland Grammar School and played for the school's 1st XV team in his final year.

After leaving school, Murray was part of the Counties Manukau Academy, but played for the Auckland U19 team at the Jock Hobbs Memorial National Under 19 Tournament in 2019.

== Senior career ==
While he wasn't named in the Auckland squad for the 2021 Bunnings NPC season, Murray made his NPC debut for the province on 14 August 2021 against Tasman.

The following year, Murray was named in the Northland squad for the 2022 Bunnings NPC. He made his debut for the Taniwha – off the bench – on 7 August 2022 against Taranaki. He scored his first try for the team on 28 August 2022 against Southland.

On 9 November 2023, Murray was named in the Crusaders squad for the 2024 Super Rugby Pacific season after an outstanding season playing for Northland. He made his Super Rugby debut for the franchise on 9 March 2024 against the Drua in Lautoka, Fiji. He played three games for the Crusaders.

Although he wasn't named in the initial Queensland Reds squad for the 2025 Super Rugby Pacific season, the franchise announced his signing on 15 November 2024 after a successful trial during a tour with the team to Japan.

== International career ==
Late 2019 and early 2020, Murray was invited to attend the New Zealand Under 20 trial and development camps in preparation of the 2020 Oceania Rugby Under 20 Championship and World Rugby U20 Championship. Unfortunately, Murray missed out on playing for the New Zealand Under 20 team, because these tournaments were cancelled due to the COVID-19 pandemic.
