= Xavi Taele =

New Zealand rugby union player

- Born: 19 December 2004 (age 21)
- Height: 182 cm (6 ft 0 in)
- Weight: 90 kg (198 lb; 14 st 2 lb)
- School: Saint Kentigern College
- University: Auckland University

Rugby union career
- Position(s): Centre, wing
- Current team: Blues, Auckland
Senior career
Years	Team	Apps	(Points)
2024–	Auckland	10	(18)
2025–	Blues	5	(4)
- Correct as of 9 December 2024
International career
Years	Team	Apps	(Points)
2023–2024	New Zealand U20	11	(20)
- Correct as of 9 December 2024

Xavi Taele (born 19 December 2004) is a New Zealand rugby union player, who plays for the Blues and Auckland. His preferred position is centre or wing. Xavi was born in Montpellier France. He lived in France in his younger years before returning to settle in Tauranga NZ with his family.

== Early career ==
Taele attended Saint Kentigern College where he was the recipient of the Michael Garner Scholarship. He represented New Zealand U20 in 2023 and 2024. He came through the Auckland academy and represented the Blues at U20s level.

== Professional career ==
Taele has represented Auckland in the National Provincial Championship since 2024, being named in their full squad for the 2024 Bunnings NPC. He was named in the Blues squad for the 2025 Super Rugby Pacific season in November 2024.
