= Motikai Murray =

Fijian rugby union player (born 2003)

- Born: 8 August 2003 (age 23) Lovoni, Ovalau, Fiji
- Height: 185 cm (6 ft 1 in)
- Weight: 92 kg (203 lb; 14 st 7 lb)

Rugby union career
- Position: Flanker
- Current team: Drua
Senior career
Years	Team	Apps	(Points)
2023–	Drua	8	(10)
- Correct as of 18 August 2023
International career
Years	Team	Apps	(Points)
2023–	Fiji U20	5	(10)
- Correct as of 18 August 2023

Motikai Murray (born 8 August 2003) is a Fijian rugby union player, who plays for the Drua in Super Rugby. His preferred position is flanker.

== Early career ==
Murray is from Lovoni village in Ovalau. He attended Ratu Kadavulevu School.

He is one of the first success stories of the High Performance Units player pathway program progressing from Deans to U19 for Suva in 2022, then selected for the Fiji U20's and Fiji Warriors in 2022–2023. Despite his small stature as a loose forward, his explosive ability and physicality caught the eye of the Fijian Drua and he was offered a development contract in 2023.

== Professional career ==
Murray was named in the Drua development squad ahead of the 2023 Super Rugby Pacific season. He was called into the main squad for Round 13 of the season, debuting against the champion Crusaders team in the quarterfinal clash at Orange Theory Stadium, Christchurch.

He was named captain of the Fiji U20s side following the Super Rugby campaign.

2025 was his breakout year for the Drua, with the new coach Glen Jackson rotation policy giving more starts to young players over established players with Murray starting in the first 6 rounds before he was banned for 3 matches for a reckless tackle
