= Ollie Sapsford =

New Zealand rugby union player

- Born: 7 October 1995 (age 31) Ashburton, New Zealand
- Height: 191 cm (6 ft 3 in)
- Weight: 104 kg (229 lb; 16 st 5 lb)
- School: Ashburton College

Rugby union career
- Position(s): Midfield back, wing
- Current team: Brumbies
Senior career
Years	Team	Apps	(Points)
2016	Mid Canterbury	5	(0)
2019–2023	Hawke's Bay	51	(75)
2022–	Brumbies	54	(25)
- Correct as of 19 May 2025
International career
Years	Team	Apps	(Points)
2023–	Australia A	2	(0)
- Correct as of 19 November 2024

Ollie Sapsford (born 7 October 1995) is a professional rugby union player, who currently plays as a midfield back or wing for the Brumbies in Super Rugby. In New Zealand, he most recently played for Hawke's Bay in the National Provincial Championship. Born in New Zealand, he represents Australia at international level, being eligible for that country on ancestry grounds.

== Early life and career ==
Sapsford hails from Ashburton in the Canterbury Region on the east coast of New Zealand's South Island. He attended Ashburton College and played age grade rugby for Mid Canterbury up to Under 16 level. He didn't play 1st XV rugby at school.

Sapsford left school at the age of 16 and started a building apprenticeship. After finishing his apprenticeship, he left for Western Australia to work on a farm for a year. While there, he played Australian rules football at club level, picking up skills that proved to be helpful in the next phases of his rugby career. After his return to New Zealand, he started playing rugby again and represented Mid Canterbury in the Heartland Championship in 2016.

Following Sapsford's season playing for Mid Canterbury, he was offered a Wellington Rugby Academy contract and played two seasons for the Wellington Development team.

Early 2019, Sapsford moved to Hawke's Bay where he played for Taradale Rugby & Sports in the province's club rugby competition.

== Senior career ==
On 4 August 2019, Sapsford was named in the Hawke's Bay squad for the 2019 Mitre 10 Cup season. He made his debut for the Magpies on 11 August 2019 against Manawatu and scored his first try for the province on 28 September 2019 in their game against Bay of Plenty.

In December 2019, Sapsford also represented Hawke's Bay at the Central Region Sevens Tournament and the New Zealand National Rugby Sevens Tournament.

Sapsford was again named in the Hawke's Bay squad for the 2020 and the 2021 season. During the 2020 Mitre 10 Cup season, Sapsford helped the Magpies win the Ranfurly Shield, successfully defend the Shield three times and win the Mitre 10 Cup Championship, thus securing a well-deserved promotion to the Premiership division. The Magpies held on to the Shield during the entire 2021 Bunnings NPC season – winning all six Ranfurly Shield defences – and finished the regular season at the top of the Premiership table. They missed out on a spot in the Premiership Final after a 27 – 33 semi-final loss to Tasman. In the regular season game against Manawatu on 30 October 2021, Sapsford scored a hat-trick in an eye-catching performance.

From 2017 to 2019, Sapsford played several games for the Hurricanes Development team. However, it was eventually an Australian Super Rugby franchise that offered him a contract. On 3 November 2021, the Brumbies announced that they had signed Sapsford on a two-year deal. He made his Super Rugby debut for his new team on 20 February 2022 against the Western Force. Sapsford scored his first Super Rugby try for the Brumbies on 2 June 2023 against the Rebels.

On 13 June 2023, the Brumbies announced that Sapsford had re-signed with the franchise for another season.

== International career ==
Following an impressive performance for the Hawke's Bay Sevens team in December 2019, Sapsford was called up to train with the All Blacks Sevens Development squad. In February 2020, he was one of the newly contracted players who were added to the All Blacks Sevens team that prepared for the 2020 Summer Olympics. One month later, World Rugby postponed all remaining tournaments of the 2019–20 World Rugby Sevens Series due to the COVID-19 pandemic and cancelled them altogether on 30 June 2020. The 2020 Olympics were postponed to 2021.

Sapsford was among the All Blacks Sevens players contracted for 2021 and was named among the non-travelling reserves for the men's rugby sevens tournament at the 2020 Summer Olympics. Again due to impact of the COVID-19 pandemic, the All Blacks Sevens did not compete at the only two tournaments of the 2021 World Rugby Sevens Series.

All in all, despite being part of the 2020 and 2021 All Blacks Sevens squad, Sapsford only had the opportunity to play for the team in warm-up matches against the Australian Sevens team during the Trans-Tasman Sevens tournament in May 2021.

On 5 July 2023, Sapsford was named in the Australia A squad for a one-off match against Tonga. He qualifies for Australia on ancestry grounds via his mother. He made his debut for Australia A on 14 July 2023, coming onto the field in the 56th minute of the game. Australia lost the game to Tonga 21–27. In November 2024, he played two games for the team (then named Australia XV) against Bristol Bears and England A.
