= Isikeli Rabitu =

Fijian rugby union player (born 2005)

- Born: 22 January 2005 (age 21) Fiji

Rugby union career
- Position: Fly-half / Fullback
- Current team: Drua
Senior career
Years	Team	Apps	(Points)
2024–	Drua	2	(0)
- Correct as of 3 March 2024

Isikeli Rabitu (born 22 January 2005) is a Fijian rugby union player, who plays for the Drua. His preferred position is fly-half or fullback.

== Early career ==
Rabitu is from Bau, and attended Suva Grammar School. He represented Fiji in the 2022 U20 World Championship.

== Professional career ==
Rabitu was named in the development squad for the Drua ahead of the 2023 Super Rugby Pacific season. He was named in the full squad for the 2024 season, making his debut in Round 1 of the competition against the Blues.
