= Gideon Wrampling =

New Zealand rugby union player

- Born: 26 July 2001 (age 25) New Zealand
- Height: 188 cm (6 ft 2 in)
- Weight: 102 kg (225 lb; 16 st 1 lb)

Rugby union career
- Position: Centre / Wing
- Current team: Suntory Sungoliath
Senior career
Years	Team	Apps	(Points)
2020–2025	Waikato	33	(25)
2021–2025	Chiefs	5	(10)
2025–	Suntory Sungoliath	3	(5)
- Correct as of 1 March 2025
International career
Years	Team	Apps	(Points)
2025	Māori All Blacks	2	(10)

Gideon Wrampling (born 26 July 2001 in New Zealand) is a New Zealand rugby union player who plays for the Chiefs in Super Rugby. His playing position is centre or wing.

== Rugby career ==
Gideon attended St Paul's Collegiate School and was selected for New Zealand Schoolboys and New Zealand under-20.

He joined the Waikato 2020 Mitre 10 Cup squad.

He was named in the Chiefs squad for round 10 of the 2021 Super Rugby Aotearoa season.
