= Josh Fusitu'a =

New Zealand rugby union player

Joshua Fusitu'a
- Full name: Joshua Fusitu'a
- Born: 1 May 2001 (age 25) New Zealand
- Height: 183 cm (6 ft 0 in)
- Weight: 118 kg (260 lb; 18 st 8 lb)
- School: Auckland Grammar School
- Notable relative: David Fusitu'a (brother)

Rugby union career
- Position: Prop
- Current team: Blues, Auckland
Senior career
Years	Team	Apps	(Points)
2022–	Blues	37	(5)
2022–	Auckland	14	(0)
- Correct as of 8 May 2024
International career
Years	Team	Apps	(Points)
2025	ANZAC XV	1	(0)

Joshua Fusitu'a (also spelled Fusitua, born 1 May 2001) is a New Zealand rugby union player who plays for the Blues in Super Rugby. His playing position is prop. He was named in the Blues squad for the rescheduled Round 1 of the 2022 Super Rugby Pacific season. He made his debut in the same fixture, coming on as a replacement.
