= Tom Savage (rugby union) =

English rugby union player (born 1989)

- Born: 18 April 1989 (age 37) Havering, England
- Height: 1.97 m (6 ft 6 in)
- Weight: 116 kg (256 lb; 18 st 4 lb)

Rugby union career
- Position(s): Lock, Flanker
Senior career
| Years | Team | Apps | (Points) |
| 2011–2019 | Gloucester | 194 | (35) |
| 2019–2023 | Suntory Sungoliath | 28 | (5) |
| 2024–2026 | Moana Pasifika | 27 | (0) |
| 2025–2026 | North Harbour | 10 | (0) |
| 2026– | Worcester Warriors | 0 | (0) |
- Correct as of 4 October 2025

Tom Savage (born 24 April 1989) is an English professional rugby union player who played as a lock or flanker for Moana Pasifika in Super Rugby.

Savage previously played for Gloucester in the Aviva Premiership, signing his first contract with and making his debut for the club in 2011. In December 2012, he signed a three-year contract extension with Gloucester until end of 2015–16 season. In July 2015, he once more extended his stay with the club, agreeing to another long-term deal.

Savage captained Gloucester during the 2013–14 season.

On 5 April 2019, Savage left Gloucester after eight seasons with his home club to play with Suntory Sungoliath in Japan's Top League competition. He went on to play four seasons for the club.

On 9 November 2023, he was named in the Moana Pasifika squad for the 2024 Super Rugby Pacific season.

On 9 June 2026, Savage would return to England to join local rivals Worcester Warriors in the RFU Championship for the 2026-27 season.
