= Antonio Shalfoon =

New Zealand rugby union player

- Full name: Antonio Shalfoon
- Born: 10 August 1997 (age 29) New Zealand
- Height: 198 cm (6 ft 6 in)
- Weight: 113 kg (17 st 11 lb; 249 lb)
- School: Lincoln High School

Rugby union career
- Position: Lock
- Current team: Yamaha Blue Revs
Senior career
Years	Team	Apps	(Points)
2019	Waikato	5	(0)
2021–2026	Tasman	39	(0)
2024–2026	Crusaders	33	(15)
2026–	Yamaha Blue Revs	0	(0)
- Correct as of 24 September 2026
International career
Years	Team	Apps	(Points)
2025	Māori All Blacks	1	(0)
- Correct as of 24 September 2026

Antonio J. Shalfoon (born 10 August 1997) is a New Zealand rugby union player who played for Tasman in the Bunnings NPC and the Crusaders in Super Rugby. His position is Lock.

== Bunnings NPC ==
Shalfoon was named in the 2019 Waikato squad and played 6 games in the 2019 season. In 2020 he was named in the Tasman Mako squad for the 2020 Mitre 10 Cup. He missed the season with injury as the Mako went on to win their second premiership title in a row. Shalfoon made his debut for the side in Round 1 of the 2021 Bunnings NPC against Bay of Plenty, starting at number 5 in a 14-27 win for Tasman - while also becoming Mako number 200. In just his third match for Tasman Shalfoon captained the side against Bay of Plenty at Trafalgar Park in a non competition match, the Mako coming away with the win 26–9. Tasman went on to make the premiership final in 2021 before losing 23–20 to Waikato.
