= Ponepati Loganimasi =

Fiji international rugby union player (born 1998)

- Born: 26 March 1998 (age 28)
- Height: 196 cm (6 ft 5 in)
- Weight: 91 kg (201 lb)

Rugby union career
- Current team: Fijian Drua
Senior career
Years	Team	Apps	(Points)
2025-2026	Fijian Drua	3	(20)
2026–	Sale Sharks	0	(0)
International career
Years	Team	Apps	(Points)
2024-	Fiji	4	(15)
National sevens team
Years	Team		Comps
2023-2024	Fiji		
Medal record
Men's rugby sevens
Representing Fiji
Olympic Games
Silver medal – second place	2024 Paris	Team competition

Ponepati Loganimasi (born 26 March 1998) is a Fijian rugby union player who played for Fiji national rugby sevens team and currently plays for the Fijian Drua in Super Rugby Pacific.

== Career ==
From Ono-i-Lau island, he played for Savusavu prior to joining Uluinakau in 2021. He was called up to the Fiji national rugby sevens team in February 2023. He is a versatile player able to play in the forwards or the backs in rugby sevens. That month, he had a try scoring introduction to the Fiji team at the SVNS tournament in Los Angeles.

He continued to play for the Fijian national sevens team throughout the 2023–24 SVNS campaign. He was selected for the 2024 Paris Olympics in July 2024.

On 24 February 2026, Loganimasi would move to England to sign for Sale Sharks on a two-year deal in the Premiership Rugby from the 2026–27 season.
