= Cullen Grace =

New Zealand rugby union player

- Full name: Cullen James Grace
- Born: 20 December 1999 (age 26) Hāwera, New Zealand
- Height: 190 cm (6 ft 3 in)
- Weight: 107 kg (236 lb; 16 st 12 lb)
- School: Timaru Boys' High School

Rugby union career
- Position(s): Number 8, Flanker, Lock
- Current team: Canterbury, Crusaders
Senior career
Years	Team	Apps	(Points)
2019–	Canterbury	23	(40)
2020–	Crusaders	55	(50)
- Correct as of 7 September 2024
International career
Years	Team	Apps	(Points)
2019	New Zealand U20	7	(0)
2020	New Zealand	1	(0)
2022–	Māori All Blacks	3	(5)
- Correct as of 7 September 2024

Cullen James Grace (born 20 December 1999) is a New Zealand rugby union player who plays for the Crusaders in Super Rugby and Canterbury in the NPC as a lock.

== Club career ==
=== Canterbury and Crusaders ===
In 2018, Grace captained the Canterbury under-19 team.

He was named in the Crusaders squad for the 2020 season.

=== Scarlets ===
On 26 June 2026, Grace signed with the Scarlets in the United Rugby Championship.

== International career ==
Grace represented New Zealand U20 in the 2019 World Rugby Under 20 Championship.

Grace made his All Blacks debut on 7 November 2020 against Australia at Brisbane. In 2022, He was called into the Māori All Blacks squad for the match against Ireland.

== Personal life ==
Grace is a New Zealander of Māori (Ngāti Whakaue) descent.
