= Brayden Iose =

New Zealand rugby union player

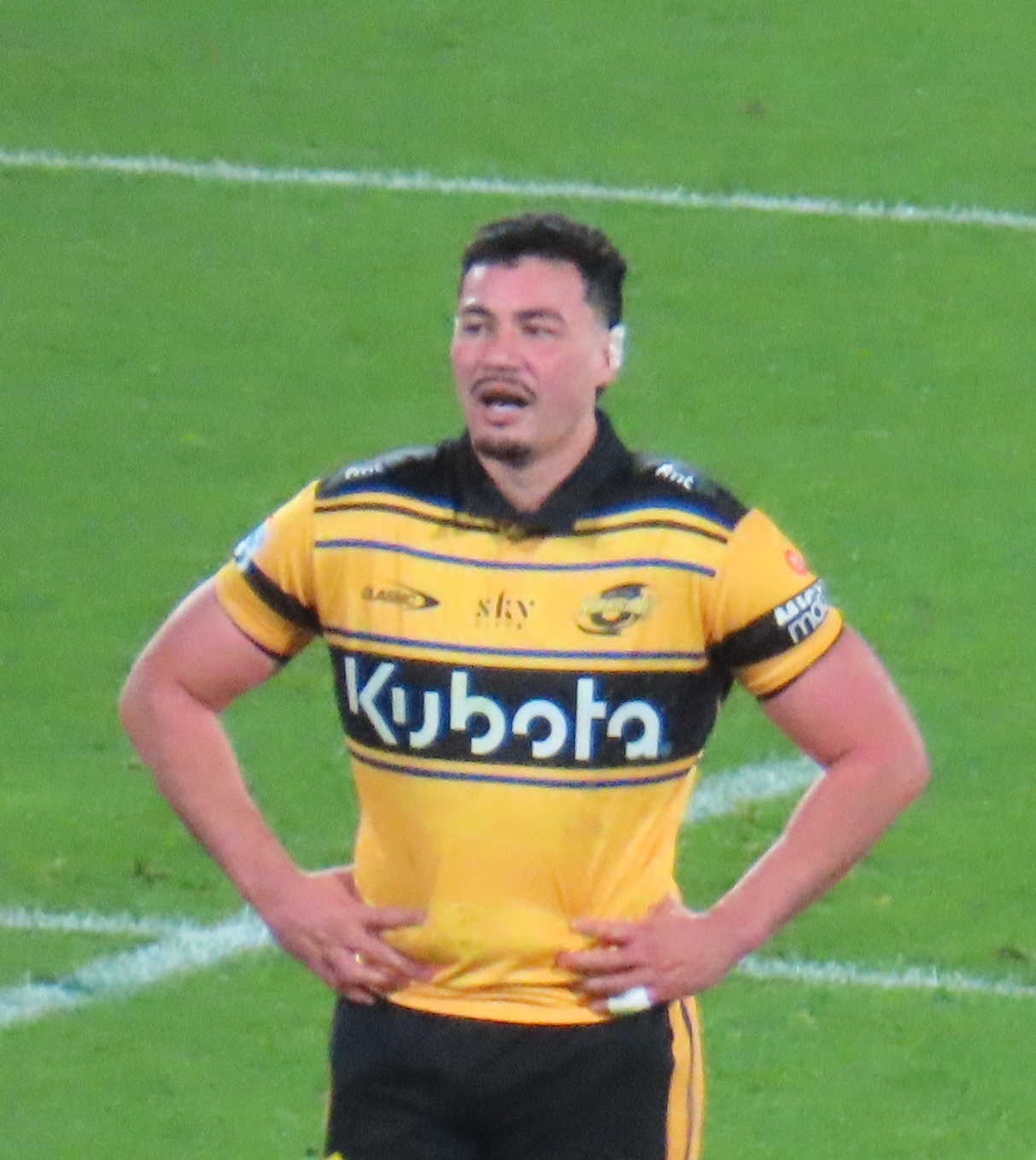
- Iose playing for the Hurricanes in the 2026 Super Rugby Pacific final
- Born: 26 August 1998 (age 28) Paraparaumu, New Zealand
- Height: 188 cm (6 ft 2 in)
- Weight: 109 kg (240 lb; 17 st 2 lb)
- School: Palmerston North Boys' High School

Rugby union career
- Position(s): Flanker, Number 8
- Current team: Manawatu, Hurricanes
Senior career
Years	Team	Apps	(Points)
2017–	Manawatu	55	(45)
2021–	Hurricanes	60	(80)
- Correct as of 1 May 2026

Brayden Iose (born 26 August 1998 in New Zealand) is a New Zealand rugby union player who plays for the Hurricanes in Super Rugby. His playing position is flanker or number 8. He was named in the Hurricanes squad for the 2021 Super Rugby Aotearoa season. He was also a member of the Manawatu 2020 Mitre 10 Cup squad.

== Club career ==
In 2026, Iose formed part of the Hurricanes squad which won the 2026 Super Rugby Pacific season. On 20 June, the Hurricanes defeated the Chiefs 60–5 in the final.
