= Harry Godfrey =

New Zealand rugby union player (born 2003)

- Full name: Hamish Godfrey
- Born: 3 January 2003 (age 23) Hunterville, New Zealand
- Height: 175 cm (5 ft 9 in)
- Weight: 85 kg (187 lb; 13 st 5 lb)
- School: Whanganui Collegiate School

Rugby union career
- Position(s): First five-eighth, Fullback
- Current team: Hawke's Bay, Hurricanes
Senior career
Years	Team	Apps	(Points)
2021–	Hawke's Bay	25	(153)
2023–	Hurricanes	15	(60)
- Correct as of 13 December 2025
International career
Years	Team	Apps	(Points)
2021–	New Zealand U20	9	(16)
- Correct as of 16 July 2023

Harry Godfrey (born 3 January 2003) is a New Zealand rugby union player who currently plays as a first five-eighth or fullback for Hawke's Bay in New Zealand's domestic National Provincial Championship competition and for the Hurricanes in Super Rugby.

== Early career ==
Godfrey was born and raised in Hunterville in the Manawatū-Whanganui region in the lower half of New Zealand's North Island. He attended Whanganui Collegiate School and played both rugby and cricket for the school. In 2019, he played for the school's 1st XV team that finished second in the Central North Island competition. The following year, he captained the team to a third place in that competition. He also played rugby sevens for his school, including at the 2020 Hurricanes Secondary School Sevens, of which he made the Tournament Team.

Godfrey represented Whanganui at age grade level.

After graduating high school, Godfrey headed to Hawke's Bay where he plays for the Central Hawke's Bay Rugby & Sports Club in the province's club rugby competition.

After good performances for the Hawke's Bay Academy team in 2021, Godfrey was named in the Hurricanes U20 squad for that year's Super Rugby Aotearoa Under-20 tournament.

== Senior career ==
At only 18 years old, Godfrey was named in the Hawke's Bay squad for the 2021 Bunnings NPC season. He made his debut for the province on 6 November 2021 in a non-competition game against Northland. He scored his first try for the Magpies the following season, in their Ranfurly Shield defence against Poverty Bay on 30 July 2022. His first NPC game followed on 17 August 2022 against Otago in Dunedin.

Godfrey was one of a select group of young players, who earned a National Development Contract and trained with the Hurricanes ahead of, and during, the 2022 Super Rugby Pacific season. On 25 March 2022, he was named in the Hurricanes U20 team for the 2022 Bunnings Warehouse Super Rugby U20 competition in Taupō.

In 2023, Godfrey was again among the National Development Contracted players, who trained with the Hurricanes. He played in both the Hurricanes' preseason games ahead of the 2023 Super Rugby Pacific season. Although he wasn't named in the initial Hurricanes squad for their 2023 campaign, he was on the team sheet for their round 1 game against the Reds and made his Super Rugby debut for the franchise – via the bench – on 25 February 2023. He made his starting debut for the Hurricanes on 2 April 2023 against the Force.

Meanwhile, for the third consecutive year, Godfrey played for the Hurricanes U20 team in the Super Rugby U20 competition in Taupō. Godfrey was one of the standout players of the tournament and received the Sir John Graham Player of the Tournament award.

On 3 April 2023, the Hurricanes announced that the franchise had signed Godfrey until the end of 2025. He scored his first try for the Hurricanes almost a year later, on 22 March 2024, against the Rebels.

== International career ==
In 2020, after an outstanding 1st XV season, Godfrey was invited to attend a Barbarians Under 18 Development Camp, at the end of which he was named in the New Zealand Secondary Schools team. Due to the COVID-19 pandemic, this was only a paper team and it didn't play any games.

A year later, Godfrey was for the first time named in the New Zealand Under 20 team. However, due to the continuing impact of the COVID-19 pandemic, both the 2021 Oceania Rugby Under 20 Championship and World Rugby U20 Championship were cancelled. Instead, the team played a series of four matches on home soil, including one international match against the Cook Islands national team. The NZ Under 20s won that game 73 – 0 and Godfrey scored one of the tries.

In 2022, Godfrey was again named in the New Zealand Under 20 team and played in two of the three matches of the 2022 Oceania Rugby Under 20 Championship. New Zealand won the tournament after winning all three games.

Godfrey was for the third time named in the New Zealand Under 20 squad in 2023. He played one game in a two-test series against Australia and competed at the 2023 World Rugby U20 Championship.
