= Miracle Faiʻilagi =

Samoan rugby union player

- Born: 31 August 1999 (age 27) Apia, Samoa
- Height: 1.90 m (6 ft 3 in)
- Weight: 120 kg (265 lb; 18 st 13 lb)
- School: Leifiifi College

Rugby union career
- Position(s): Flanker, Lock, Number 8
- Current team: JR East Green Warriors
Senior career
| Years | Team | Apps | (Points) |
| 2023–2026 | Moana Pasifika | 44 | (90) |
| 2025 | Hawke's Bay | 11 | (25) |
| 2026– | JR East Green Warriors | | |
- Correct as of 16 June 2026
International career
| Years | Team | Apps | (Points) |
| 2020 | Samoa A | 3 | (0) |
| 2023– | Samoa | 9 | (15) |
- Correct as of 20 July 2026
National sevens team
| Years | Team | | Comps |
| 2021– | Samoa | | 4 |
- Correct as of 28 August 2023

Miracle Faiʻilagi (born 31 August 1999) is a Samoan professional rugby union player, who plays as a flanker for Hawke's Bay in New Zealand's domestic National Provincial Championship competition. He represents Samoa internationally.

== Club career ==
Faiʻilagi was born in Samoa and played his junior rugby and club rugby on the island for Vailele Rugby Club. In 2022, he attended a World Rugby talent combine, where he was scouted by Moana Pasifika and signed for their 2023 squad.

== International career ==
He represented Samoa A in the 2020 World Rugby Pacific Challenge. Since 2021 he has represented Samoa Sevens, although missed out on selection for the 2022 Commonwealth Games.
