= Etonia Waqa =

Fijian rugby union player (born 1999)

- Full name: Etonia Bose Waqa
- Born: 2 June 1999 (age 27) Lomati, Nabukelevu, Kadavu. Fiji
- Height: 196 cm (6 ft 5 in)
- Weight: 96 kg (212 lb; 15 st 2 lb)

Rugby union career
- Position: Lock
- Current team: Drua, Bay of Plenty
Senior career
| Years | Team | Apps | (Points) |
| 2022– | Bay of Plenty | 6 | (0) |
| 2023– | Drua | 8 | (10) |
- Correct as of 18 August 2023
International career
| Years | Team | Apps | (Points) |
| 2019 | Fiji U20 | | |
- Correct as of 18 August 2023

Etonia Waqa (born 2 June 1999) is a Fijian rugby union player, who plays for the Drua in Super Rugby. His preferred position is lock and loose forward.

== Early career ==
Waqa is from Lomati village in Nabukelevu on Kadavu Island.

Attended QVS in Tailevu and was awarded scholarship to attend Saint Kentigern College and playing for their first XV.

Following selection for the Fiji U20 team he moved to New Zealand, featuring for Te Puna rugby club in the Bay of Plenty region and earning selection for the Bay of Plenty Steamers for 2022 Mitre 10 Cup.

== Professional career ==
Waqa was called into the Drua squad ahead of Round 11 of the 2023 Super Rugby Pacific season, making his debut against the Hurricanes. He was named in the Bay of Plenty squad for the 2023 Bunnings NPC, having been named as a late replacement in the 2022 edition, and having previously represented Bay of Plenty at junior level.
