= Jeremy Williams (rugby union) =

Australian rugby union player (born 2000)

- Born: 2 December 2000 (age 25) Australia
- Height: 1.98 m (6 ft 6 in)
- Weight: 119 kg (262 lb)

Rugby union career
- Position: Lock
- Current team: Western Force
Senior career
Years	Team	Apps	(Points)
2021–2022	Waratahs	16	(5)
2023–	Force	48	(30)
- Correct as of 30 May 2026
International career
Years	Team	Apps	(Points)
2024–	Australia	35	(15)
- Correct as of 17 October 2026

Jeremy Williams (born 2 December 2000) is an Australian rugby union player who is the current captain for the Western Force in Super Rugby. His playing position is lock.

== Professional career ==
Williams was named in the Waratahs squad for the 2021 Super Rugby AU season. He had previously been named in the Waratahs squads for the 2019 and 2020 Super Rugby seasons, but didn't make any appearances. Williams made his debut for the Waratahs in Round 1 of the 2021 Super Rugby AU season against the Reds, coming on as a replacement.

In 2023, Williams moved to the Western Force. He was named captain ahead of the 2024 Super Rugby season.

In June 2024, Williams was called into the Wallabies squad under new coach Joe Schmidt. Williams made his international debut for the Wallabies against Wales in Sydney on 6 July 2024.
