= Patrick Pellegrini =

Tonga international rugby union player

- Born: 28 September 1998 (age 28) Sydney, Australia
- Height: 170 cm (5 ft 7 in)
- Weight: 80 kg (176 lb)

Rugby union career
- Position: Fly half
Amateur team(s)
Years	Team	Apps	(Points)
–	Sevenoaks RFC		
Senior career
Years	Team	Apps	(Points)
2022–2024	Coventry	36	(325)
2025–2026	Moana Pasifika	4	(44)
International career
Years	Team	Apps	(Points)
2023–	Tonga	12	(38)

Patrick Pellegrini is an Australian born Tongan rugby union fly-half who played for Moana Pasifika in Super Rugby. He also plays internationally for Tonga.

== Personal life ==
Pellegrini was born and raised in Sydney, Australia to an Australian father and Tongan mother. Pellegrini also has Italian and English heritage.

== Club career ==
Pellegrini started off playing both rugby league and rugby union when he was younger but opted to focus on union when he was 14.

He represented West Harbour in the Shute Shield, Randwick, and the New South Wales under-20 before coming to England to play for Sevenoaks RFC in Kent.

He then signed for Coventry (who play in the RFU Championship) in the summer of 2022 after a successful trial. In the 2022–23 season, he scored nine tries in eighteen games (153 points in total).

In September 2023, Pellegrini helped Coventry beat Premiership team Saracens in the 2023–24 Premiership Rugby Cup.

On the 5th August 2024, Pellegrini signed with Super Rugby side, Moana Pasifika for the 2025 season.

== International career ==
He made his international debut for Tonga in a World Cup warm up match against Fiji in July 2023. Tonga lost 36–20. He also played two Test matches against Canada in one of which he made his first start. In August he was not named in the squad for the World Cup. He was recalled during the pool stage in place of Otumaka Mausia, who was injured and ruled out for the rest of the competition. He made his World Cup debut by playing three games and scoring a try against South Africa.
