= Tom Lynagh =

Australian rugby union player

- Born: 14 April 2003 (age 23) Montebelluna, Italy
- Height: 179 cm (5 ft 10 in)
- Weight: 89 kg (196 lb; 14 st 0 lb)
- Notable relative(s): Michael Lynagh (father); Louis Lynagh (brother)

Rugby union career
- Position: Fly-half
- Current team: Reds
Youth career
- 2020–2022: Harlequins
Senior career
Years	Team	Apps	(Points)
2022–	Reds	37	(214)
- Correct as of 29 April 2026
International career
Years	Team	Apps	(Points)
2024–	Australia	8	(24)
- Correct as of 29 April 2026

Tom Lynagh (born 14 April 2003) is an Australian rugby union player, currently playing for the Reds. His preferred position is fly-half.

== Early life ==
Lynagh is the son of Australian international Michael Lynagh, and was born in Montebelluna, near Treviso, Italy. He is qualified to represent Australia, England or Italy internationally. His brother Louis Lynagh is also a professional rugby player who plays for Benetton Rugby and the Italy national team. Lynagh attended Epsom College in Surrey.

== Professional career ==
=== Club ===
Lynagh was originally a member of the Harlequins academy alongside his brother Louis. He moved to Australia in 2021, signing for the Queensland Reds. He was announced in the Reds squad for the 2022 season, although he didn't make an appearance, before again being announced in the squad for 2023. He made his debut in Round 1 of the 2023 Super Rugby Pacific season against the Hurricanes.

=== International ===
He was named in the Junior Wallabies squad for 2023.

In 2024, Lynagh made his first appearance from the bench as one of seven new Wallabies in a win against Wales.

In July 2025, he made his first start in a 19–27 defeat during the first test of the 2025 British & Irish Lions tour.
