= List of 2023–24 Super Rugby transfers (New Zealand) =

This is a list of player movements for Super Rugby teams prior to the end of the 2024 Super Rugby Pacific season. Departure and arrivals of all players that were included in a Super Rugby squad for 2023 or 2024 are listed here, regardless of when it occurred. Future-dated transfers are only included if confirmed by the player or his agent, his former team or his new team.

Notes

- 2023 players listed are all players that were named in the initial senior squad, or subsequently included in a 23-man match day squad at any game during the season.
- (did not play) denotes that a player did not play at all during the season due to injury or non-selection. These players are included to indicate they were contracted to the team.
- (short-term) denotes that a player wasn't initially contracted, but came in during the season. This could either be a club rugby player coming in as injury cover, or a player whose contract had expired at another team (typically in the Northern Hemisphere).
- (development squad) denotes a player that wasn't named in the original squad, but was announced as signing as a development player. These are often younger players or club players. Different teams use different names for development players. Other names used include (wider training group) or (wider training squad).
- Flags are only shown for players moving to or from another country.
- Players may play in several positions, but are listed in only one.

== Blues ==
Blues transfers 2023–2024
Pos	2023 squad	Out	In	2024 players
PR	Josh Fusitua; Alex Hodgman; Nepo Laulala; James Lay; Jordan Lay (short-term); Marcel Renata; Ofa Tuʻungafasi	(substituted off) Alex Hodgman (to (Australia) Reds); (substituted off) Nepo Laulala (to (France) Toulouse); (substituted off) James Lay (to Moana Pasifika)	(substituted in) PJ Sheck (from Highlanders); (substituted in) Angus Taʻavao (from Chiefs); (substituted in) Mason Tupaea (from Waikato)	Josh Fusitua; Jordan Lay; Marcel Renata; PJ Sheck; Angus Taʻavao; Mason Tupaea (short-term); Ofa Tuʻungafasi
HK	Kurt Eklund; Ricky Riccitelli; Soane Vikena			Kurt Eklund; Ricky Riccitelli; Soane Vikena
LK	Sam Darry; Taine Plumtree; James Tucker; Patrick Tuipulotu	(substituted off) Taine Plumtree (to (Wales) Scarlets); (substituted off) James Tucker (to Hurricanes)	(substituted in) Josh Beehre (from Auckland); (substituted in) Laghlan McWhannell (from Chiefs)	Josh Beehre; Sam Darry; Laghlan McWhannell; Patrick Tuipulotu
BR	Adrian Choat; Akira Ioane; Dalton Papalii; Tom Robinson; Rob Rush; Anton Segner; Hoskins Sotutu; Cameron Suafoa	(substituted off) Tom Robinson (to (Japan) Toyota Verblitz)	(substituted in) James Thompson (from Counties Manukau)	Adrian Choat; Akira Ioane; Dalton Papalii; Rob Rush; Anton Segner; Hoskins Sotutu; Cameron Suafoa; James Thompson
SH	Finlay Christie; Taufa Funaki; Sam Nock			Finlay Christie; Taufa Funaki; Sam Nock
FH	Beauden Barrett; Stephen Perofeta; Harry Plummer	(substituted off) Beauden Barrett (to (Japan) Toyota Verblitz)	(substituted in) Lucas Cashmore (from Bay of Plenty)	Lucas Cashmore; Stephen Perofeta; Harry Plummer
CE	Corey Evans; Bryce Heem; Rieko Ioane; Tanielu Teleʻa (did not play); Roger Tuivasa-Sheck	(substituted off) Tanielu Teleʻa (to Highlanders); (substituted off) Roger Tuivasa-Sheck (to New Zealand Warriors)	(substituted in) Meihana Grindlay (from Taranaki)	Corey Evans; Meihana Grindlay; Bryce Heem; Rieko Ioane
WG	Caleb Clarke; AJ Lam; Jacob Ratumaitavuki-Kneepkens; Caleb Tangitau; Mark Tele'a	(substituted off) Jacob Ratumaitavuki-Kneepkens (to Highlanders)	(substituted in) Kade Banks (from North Harbour)	Kade Banks; Caleb Clarke; AJ Lam; Caleb Tangitau; Mark Tele'a
FB	Zarn Sullivan		(substituted in) Cole Forbes (from Bay of Plenty)	Cole Forbes; Zarn Sullivan
Coach	Leon MacDonald	(substituted off) Leon MacDonald (to New Zealand (assistant))	(substituted in) Vern Cotter (from Fiji)	Vern Cotter

== Chiefs ==
Chiefs transfers 2023–2024
Pos	2023 squad	Out	In	2024 players
PR	George Dyer; Atu Moli; Ollie Norris; Jared Proffit; Aidan Ross; John Ryan; Angus Taʻavao (did not play); Solomone Tukuafu (short-term)	(substituted off) Atu Moli (to (Australia) Force); (substituted off) John Ryan (to (Ireland) Munster); (substituted off) Angus Taʻavao (to Blues); (substituted off) Solomone Tukuafu (to Highlanders)	(substituted in) Sione Ahio (from Auckland); (substituted in) Kauvaka Kaivelata (from Counties Manukau); (substituted in) Reuben O'Neill (from Crusaders)	Sione Ahio; George Dyer; Kauvaka Kaivelata; Ollie Norris; Reuben O'Neill; Jared Proffit; Aidan Ross
HK	Bradley Slater; Samisoni Taukei'aho; Tyrone Thompson			Bradley Slater; Samisoni Taukei'aho; Tyrone Thompson
LK	Naitoa Ah Kuoi; Josh Lord; Laghlan McWhannell; Brodie Retallick; Manaaki Selby-Rickit; Tupou Vaa'i	(substituted off) Laghlan McWhannell (to Blues); (substituted off) Brodie Retallick (to (Japan) Kobelco Kobe Steelers)	(substituted in) Hamilton Burr (from Waikato); (substituted in) Jimmy Tupou (from Counties Manukau)	Naitoa Ah Kuoi; Hamilton Burr (wider-training squad); Josh Lord; Manaaki Selby-Rickit; Jimmy Tupou; Tupou Vaa'i
BR	Kaylum Boshier; Sam Cane; Samipeni Finau; Luke Jacobson; Simon Parker; Pita Gus Sowakula	(substituted off) Sam Cane (to (Japan) Suntory Sungoliath); (substituted off) Pita Gus Sowakula (to (France) Clermont)	(substituted in) Tom Florence (from (United States) New Orleans Gold); (substituted in) Wallace Sititi (from North Harbour); (substituted in) Malachi Wrampling-Alec (from Waikato)	Kaylum Boshier; Samipeni Finau; Tom Florence; Luke Jacobson; Simon Parker; Wallace Sititi; Malachi Wrampling-Alec
SH	Cortez Ratima; Xavier Roe (did not play); Te Toiroa Tahuriorangi; Brad Weber	(substituted off) Brad Weber (to (France) Stade Français)		Cortez Ratima; Xavier Roe; Te Toiroa Tahuriorangi
FH	Bryn Gatland; Josh Ioane; Damian McKenzie; Rivez Reihana	(substituted off) Bryn Gatland (to (Japan) Kobelco Kobe Steelers); (substituted off) Rivez Reihana (to Crusaders)	(substituted in) Josh Jacomb (from Taranaki); (substituted in) Kaleb Trask (from (Japan) Mie Honda Heat)	Josh Ioane; Josh Jacomb (wider training squad); Damian McKenzie; Kaleb Trask
CE	Lalomilo Lalomilo (short-term); Anton Lienert-Brown; Alex Nankivell; Rameka Poihipi; Daniel Rona (short-term); Quinn Tupaea (did not play); Gideon Wrampling	(substituted off) Lalomilo Lalomilo (to Moana Pasifika); (substituted off) Alex Nankivell (to (Ireland) Munster)		Anton Lienert-Brown; Rameka Poihipi; Daniel Rona; Quinn Tupaea; Gideon Wrampling
WG	Solomon Alaimalo (short-term); Liam Coombes-Fabling (short-term); Peniasi Malimali; Etene Nanai-Seturo; Emoni Narawa; Ngane Punivai	(substituted off) Solomon Alaimalo (to (Australia) Wests Tigers); (substituted off) Ngane Punivai (to Hurricanes)		Liam Coombes-Fabling; Peniasi Malimali; Etene Nanai-Seturo; Emoni Narawa
FB	Shaun Stevenson			Shaun Stevenson
Coach	Clayton McMillan			Clayton McMillan

== Crusaders ==
Crusaders transfers 2023–2024
Pos	2023 squad	Out	In	2024 players
PR	John Afoa (short-term); George Bower; Finlay Brewis; Seb Calder (short-term); Oli Jager; Joe Moody; Fletcher Newell; Reuben O'Neill (short-term); Kershawl Sykes-Martin (short-term); Andrew Turner (short-term); Tamaiti Williams	(substituted off) John Afoa (to Bay of Plenty); (substituted off) Oli Jager (to (Ireland) Munster); (substituted off) Reuben O'Neill (to Chiefs); (substituted off) Andrew Turner (returned to (England) Bristol Bears)	(substituted in) Owen Franks (from Hurricanes)	George Bower; Finlay Brewis; Seb Calder (short-term); Owen Franks; Joe Moody; Fletcher Newell; Kershawl Sykes-Martin (short-term); Tamaiti Williams
HK	George Bell (did not play); Quentin MacDonald (short-term); Brodie McAlister; Ioane Moananu (short-term); Codie Taylor		(substituted in) James Mullan (from Canterbury)	George Bell; Quentin MacDonald (short-term); Brodie McAlister; Ioane Moananu; James Mullan (short-term); Codie Taylor
LK	Scott Barrett; Mitchell Dunshea; Zach Gallagher; Jamie Hannah (short-term); Quinten Strange; Sam Whitelock	(substituted off) Mitchell Dunshea (to Highlanders); (substituted off) Sam Whitelock (to (France) Pau)	(substituted in) Tahlor Cahill (from Canterbury); (substituted in) Antonio Shalfoon (from Tasman)	Scott Barrett; Tahlor Cahill; Zach Gallagher; Jamie Hannah; Antonio Shalfoon (short-term); Quinten Strange
BR	Ethan Blackadder; Tom Christie; Dominic Gardiner; Cullen Grace; Sione Havili Talitui; Corey Kellow; Christian Lio-Willie	(substituted off) Sione Havili Talitui (to Moana Pasifika)	(substituted in) Fletcher Anderson (from Tasman)	Fletcher Anderson (short-term); Ethan Blackadder; Tom Christie; Dominic Gardiner; Cullen Grace; Corey Kellow; Christian Lio-Willie
SH	Louie Chapman (short-term); Mitchell Drummond; Willi Heinz; Noah Hotham; Joel Lam (short-term)	(substituted off) Louie Chapman (returned to Tasman); (substituted off) Joel Lam (returned to Canterbury)		Mitchell Drummond; Willi Heinz; Noah Hotham
FH	Fergus Burke; Taha Kemara; Richie Mo'unga	(substituted off) Richie Mo'unga (to (Japan) Toshiba Brave Lupus Tokyo)	(substituted in) Riley Hohepa (from Hurricanes); (substituted in) Rivez Reihana (from Chiefs)	Fergus Burke; Riley Hohepa (short-term); Taha Kemara; Rivez Reihana
CE	Braydon Ennor; Jack Goodhue; David Havili; Dallas McLeod	(substituted off) Braydon Ennor (injured); (substituted off) Jack Goodhue (to (France) Castres)	(substituted in) Levi Aumua (from Moana Pasifika); (substituted in) Ryan Crotty (from (Japan) Kubota Spears); (substituted in) Taine Robinson (from Tasman); (substituted in) Jone Rova (from Canterbury)	Levi Aumua; Ryan Crotty; David Havili; Dallas McLeod; Taine Robinson (short-term); Jone Rova
WG	Leicester Fainga'anuku; Melani Nanai; Pepesana Patafilo; Sevu Reece; Macca Springer	(substituted off) Leicester Fainga'anuku (to (France) Toulon); (substituted off) Melani Nanai (to Bay of Plenty); (substituted off) Pepesana Patafilo (to Moana Pasifika)	(substituted in) Manasa Mataele (from (Australia) Force); (substituted in) Johnny McNicholl (from (Wales) Scarlets); (substituted in) Heremaia Murray (from Northland)	Manasa Mataele; Johnny McNicholl (short-term); Heremaia Murray; Sevu Reece; Macca Springer
FB	Chay Fihaki; Will Gualter (short-term); Will Jordan	(substituted off) Will Gualter (to Tasman)	(substituted in) Toby Arnold (from (France) Lyon); (substituted in) Leigh Halfpenny (from (Wales) Scarlets)	Toby Arnold (short-term); Chay Fihaki; Leigh Halfpenny; Will Jordan
Coach	Scott Robertson	(substituted off) Scott Robertson (to New Zealand)	(substituted in) Rob Penney (from Japan U20)	Rob Penney

== Highlanders ==
Highlanders transfers 2023–2024
Pos	2023 squad	Out	In	2024 players
PR	Jermaine Ainsley; Ethan de Groot; Luca Inch (did not play); Ayden Johnstone; Daniel Lienert-Brown; Saula Ma'u; PJ Sheck (short-term); Jeff Thwaites (did not play)	(substituted off) Luca Inch (withdrawn); (substituted off) PJ Sheck (to Blues); (substituted off) Jeff Thwaites (to Bay of Plenty)	(substituted in) Solomone Tukuafu (from Chiefs); (substituted in) Rohan Wingham (from Otago)	Jermaine Ainsley; Ethan de Groot; Ayden Johnstone; Daniel Lienert-Brown; Saula Ma'u; Solomone Tukuafu (wider-training squad); Rohan Wingham
HK	Leni Apisai; Andrew Makalio; Rhys Marshall; Jack Taylor (short-term)	(substituted off) Leni Apisai (to Auckland); (substituted off) Andrew Makalio (to (Japan) Hanazono Kintetsu Liners); (substituted off) Rhys Marshall (to Waikato)	(substituted in) Henry Bell (from Otago); (substituted in) Ricky Jackson (from Otago)	Henry Bell; Ricky Jackson; Jack Taylor
LK	Josh Bekhuis (short-term); Josh Dickson; Fabian Holland; Pari Pari Parkinson; Will Tucker	(substituted off) Josh Bekhuis (returned to Southland); (substituted off) Josh Dickson (to (Japan) Toyota Verblitz)	(substituted in) Mitchell Dunshea (from Crusaders); (substituted in) Hugo Plummer (from Hurricanes)	Mitchell Dunshea; Fabian Holland; Pari Pari Parkinson; Hugo Plummer (short-term); Will Tucker
BR	Nikora Broughton; Shannon Frizell; Oliver Haig (short-term); Billy Harmon; Max Hicks; James Lentjes; Marino Mikaele-Tu'u; Hugh Renton; Sean Withy	(substituted off) Shannon Frizell (to (Japan) Toshiba Brave Lupus Tokyo); (substituted off) James Lentjes (to Otago); (substituted off) Marino Mikaele-Tu'u (to (Japan) Mitsubishi DynaBoars)	(substituted in) Hayden Michaels (from Southland); (substituted in) Tom Sanders (from (Japan) Tokyo Sungoliath); (substituted in) Will Stodart (from Otago)	Nikora Broughton; Oliver Haig; Billy Harmon; Max Hicks; Hayden Michaels; Hugh Renton; Tom Sanders; Will Stodart; Sean Withy
SH	James Arscott; Folau Fakatava; Nathan Hastie (short-term); Kemara Hauiti-Parapara (short-term); Aaron Smith; Te Toiroa Tahuriorangi (did not play)	(substituted off) Kemara Hauiti-Parapara (to Wellington); (substituted off) Aaron Smith (to (Japan) Toyota Verblitz); (substituted off) Te Toiroa Tahuriorangi (to Chiefs)		James Arscott; Folau Fakatava; Nathan Hastie
FH	Marty Banks (did not play); Freddie Burns; Mitch Hunt; Cam Millar	(substituted off) Marty Banks (to Southland); (substituted off) Freddie Burns (to (Japan) Toyota Industries Shuttles Aichi); (substituted off) Mitch Hunt (to (Japan) Mie Honda Heat)	(substituted in) Ajay Faleafaga (from Otago); (substituted in) Rhys Patchell (from (Wales) Scarlets)	Ajay Faleafaga; Cam Millar; Rhys Patchell
CE	Scott Gregory; Fetuli Paea; Jake Te Hiwi (short-term); Josh Timu; Thomas Umaga-Jensen; Matt Whaanga (short-term)	(substituted off) Scott Gregory (to (Italy) Zebre Parma); (substituted off) Fetuli Paea (to (Italy) Zebre Parma); (substituted off) Thomas Umaga-Jensen (injured)	(substituted in) Tanielu Teleʻa (from Blues)	Jake Te Hiwi; Tanielu Teleʻa; Josh Timu; Matt Whaanga
WG	Martín Bogado; Mosese Dawai; Connor Garden-Bachop; Jonah Lowe; Jona Nareki	(substituted off) Mosese Dawai (to Waikato)	(substituted in) Jacob Ratumaitavuki-Kneepkens (from Blues); (substituted in) Timoci Tavatavanawai (from Moana Pasifika)	Martín Bogado; Connor Garden-Bachop; Jonah Lowe; Jona Nareki; Jacob Ratumaitavuki-Kneepkens; Timoci Tavatavanawai
FB	Sam Gilbert; Finn Hurley (short-term); Vilimoni Koroi (did not play)	(substituted off) Vilimoni Koroi (to North Otago)		Sam Gilbert; Finn Hurley (short-term)
Coach	Clarke Dermody			Clarke Dermody

== Hurricanes ==
Hurricanes transfers 2023–2024
Pos	2023 squad	Out	In	2024 players
PR	Owen Franks; Tyrel Lomax; Tevita Mafileo; Xavier Numia; Pouri Rakete-Stones; Pasilio Tosi	(substituted off) Owen Franks (to Crusaders)	(substituted in) Siale Lauaki (from Wellington)	Siale Lauaki; Tyrel Lomax; Tevita Mafileo; Xavier Numia; Pouri Rakete-Stones; Pasilio Tosi
HK	Asafo Aumua; Dane Coles; Jacob Devery; Hame Faiva (short-term)	(substituted off) Dane Coles (to (Japan) Kubota Spears); (substituted off) Hame Faiva (to (England) Bath)	(substituted in) Kianu Kereru-Symes (from Hawke's Bay); (substituted in) James O'Reilly (from Wellington); (substituted in) Raymond Tuputupu (from Manawatu)	Asafo Aumua; Jacob Devery; Kianu Kereru-Symes (short-term); James O'Reilly; Raymond Tuputupu (short-term)
LK	Dominic Bird; James Blackwell; Caleb Delany; Hugo Plummer (short-term); Justin Sangster; Isaia Walker-Leawere	(substituted off) Dominic Bird (to Wellington); (substituted off) James Blackwell (to (Japan) Hanazono Kintetsu Liners); (substituted off) Hugo Plummer (to Highlanders)	(substituted in) Ben Grant (from (United States) San Diego Legion); (substituted in) Josh Taula (from Manawatu); (substituted in) James Tucker (from Blues)	Caleb Delany; Ben Grant; Justin Sangster; Josh Taula; James Tucker; Isaia Walker-Leawere
BR	Devan Flanders; TK Howden; Brayden Iose; Du'Plessis Kirifi; Peter Lakai; Tyler Laubscher (did not play); Reed Prinsep (did not play); Ardie Savea	(substituted off) Tyler Laubscher (to Manawatu); (substituted off) Reed Prinsep (to (Australia) Force); (substituted off) Ardie Savea (to (Japan) Kobelco Kobe Steelers)	(substituted in) Veveni Lasaqa (from Bay of Plenty); (substituted in) Brad Shields (from (France) Perpignan)	Devan Flanders; TK Howden; Brayden Iose; Du'Plessis Kirifi; Peter Lakai; Veveni Lasaqa (short-term); Brad Shields
SH	Jamie Booth; Logan Henry (short-term); TJ Perenara (did not play); Cam Roigard	(substituted off) Jamie Booth (to North Harbour); (substituted off) Logan Henry (released)	(substituted in) Richard Judd (from (United States) San Diego Legion); (substituted in) Jordi Viljoen (from Manawatu)	Richard Judd; TJ Perenara; Cam Roigard; Jordi Viljoen (short-term)
FH	Brett Cameron; Riley Hohepa (short-term); Aidan Morgan	(substituted off) Riley Hohepa (to Crusaders)		Brett Cameron; Aidan Morgan
CE	Jordie Barrett; Riley Higgins; Billy Proctor; Bailyn Sullivan; Peter Umaga-Jensen			Jordie Barrett; Riley Higgins; Billy Proctor; Bailyn Sullivan; Peter Umaga-Jensen
WG	Josh Moorby; Kini Naholo; Salesi Rayasi; Julian Savea; Daniel Sinkinson	(substituted off) Julian Savea (to Moana Pasifika)	(substituted in) Ngane Punivai (from Chiefs)	Josh Moorby; Kini Naholo; Ngane Punivai; Salesi Rayasi; Daniel Sinkinson
FB	Harry Godfrey (short-term); Ruben Love			Harry Godfrey; Ruben Love
Coach	Jason Holland	(substituted off) Jason Holland (to New Zealand (assistant))	(substituted in) Clark Laidlaw (from New Zealand Sevens)	Clark Laidlaw

== See also ==
- List of 2023–24 Premiership Rugby transfers
- List of 2023–24 United Rugby Championship transfers
- List of 2023–24 Top 14 transfers
- List of 2023–24 RFU Championship transfers
- List of 2023–24 Rugby Pro D2 transfers
- List of 2023–24 Major League Rugby transfers
- SANZAAR
- Super Rugby franchise areas
