= 2023 Bunnings NPC =

2023 rugby union competition in New Zealand

2023 Bunnings NPC season
- Countries: New Zealand
- Date: 4 August – 21 October 2023
- Champions: Taranaki
- Runners-up: Hawke's Bay
- Matches played: 77
- Tries scored: 568 (average 7.4 per match)
- Top point scorer: Lincoln McClutchie (Hawke's Bay); 125 points
- Top try scorer: Manaaki Selby-Rickit (Bay of Plenty); 9 tries

Official website
- www.provincial.rugby

The 2023 Bunnings NPC season was the 18th season of New Zealand's provincial rugby union competition, the National Provincial Championship, since it turned professional in 2006. It involved the top fourteen provincial rugby unions of New Zealand, which – under a new format introduced in 2022 – all played for the same title. For sponsorship reasons, the competition is known as the Bunnings NPC. The regular season began on 4 August 2023, when Tasman hosted Otago. The final took place on 21 October 2023.

== Format ==
In 2022, a new competition format was introduced. In this new format, the 14 provincial unions participating in the Bunnings NPC are grouped in one single division and play for one NPC title. While in 2022 the teams were seeded in two equal conferences, an "Odds Conference" and an "Evens Conference", a further format change in 2023 has resulted in the merger of the two conferences and teams are now ranked on one competition table instead of two separate conference tables.

All provincial teams play ten games during the regular season (round robin): five games are played at the provincial union's home ground and five games are away games. The seven teams that finished the previous season in 1st, 3rd, 5th, 7th, 9th, 11th and 13th place will play each other as well as four cross-over matches against the teams that finished 2nd, 4th, 6th, 8th, 10th, 12th and 14th. Likewise, the teams that finished 2nd, 4th, 6th, 8th, 10th, 12th and 14th will also play each other as well as four cross-over games against the provinces that were ranked 1st, 3rd, 5th, 7th, 9th, 11th or 13th at the end of the previous season. The ten round robin games in 2023 are played over a period of nine weeks (starting on Friday 4 August 2023) and include one mid-week game to be played on a Wednesday night.

The regular season is followed by quarter-finals to be played by the eight highest ranked teams on the competition table. The finals rankings are determined by the number of competition points earned during the regular season. Competition points can be gained in the following way: four points are awarded to the winning team, two points to each team for a draw, and no points for a loss. Teams can also receive a bonus point if they score four or more tries in a match, or lose by seven points or less.

If two or more provincial teams finish with an equal number of competition points, the following tiebreaker rules apply. If two unions are tied, the union which has defeated the other in a head-to-head is placed higher. In case of a draw between them, the side with the biggest points difference is ranked higher. If three or more unions are tied and they have all played each other, the team with most competition points in that year against the other tied unions is ranked higher; if they have not all played each other, the team with the biggest points difference in the round robin is ranked higher. In all cases, if these unions are still tied, the ranking is decided by the highest number of tries scored, the most points scored, or a coin toss.

The quarter-finals are played as follows, with the highest ranked team hosting:

QF 1: 1 v 8;
QF 2: 2 v 7;
QF 3: 3 v 6; and
QF 4: 4 v 5.

In the semi-finals, the highest-ranked quarter-final winner hosts the lowest-ranked quarter-final winner and the second highest-ranked quarter-final winner hosts the third highest-ranked quarter-final winner.

The NPC Final will be played between the two semi-final winners, again at the home venue of the team with the higher finals ranking.

No changes have been made to the rules governing Ranfurly Shield Challenges. Every home game during the regular season played by the union that holds the Ranfurly Shield is a mandartory challenge match. No challenge matches will be played after the regular season has ended (i.e., during the finals). A holder who competes in the Bunnings NPC must also accept at least two challenges from unions competing in the Heartland Championship, including the winner of the Meads Cup at the end of the previous season. These non-mandatory challenge matches must be played before the start of the NPC season.

== Standings ==
The final standings for the 2023 Bunnings NPC season:

Pos	Team	Pld	W	D	L	PF	PA	PD	TF	TA	TB	LB	Pts	Qualification
1	Wellington	10	9	0	1	299	148	+151	40	22	6	1	43	Bunnings NPC quarter-finals
2	Taranaki (C)	10	7	0	3	300	217	+83	44	27	8	2	38	Bunnings NPC quarter-finals
3	Canterbury	10	6	0	4	351	271	+80	48	37	9	4	37	Bunnings NPC quarter-finals
4	Bay of Plenty	10	7	0	3	285	241	+44	39	32	6	1	35	Bunnings NPC quarter-finals
5	Hawke's Bay (RU, RS)	10	7	0	3	304	264	+40	42	35	5	1	34	Bunnings NPC quarter-finals
6	Auckland	10	6	0	4	291	243	+48	41	33	6	2	32	Bunnings NPC quarter-finals
7	Tasman	10	6	0	4	230	206	+24	35	28	5	2	31	Bunnings NPC quarter-finals
8	Waikato	10	5	0	5	282	253	+29	43	37	7	2	29	Bunnings NPC quarter-finals
9	Counties Manukau	10	4	0	6	280	316	−36	41	47	7	1	24	
10	North Harbour	10	4	0	6	272	295	−23	36	44	3	3	22	
11	Otago	10	3	0	7	213	294	−81	30	40	4	2	18	
12	Northland	10	2	1	7	243	282	−39	28	35	4	3	17	
13	Manawatu	10	2	0	8	199	423	−224	30	60	4	0	12	
14	Southland	10	1	1	8	197	293	−96	25	45	2	1	9	

Source: Bunnings NPC standings 2023
(C) Champions; (RU) Runners-up; (RS) Ranfurly Shield holders

=== Standings progression ===
The table below shows each team's progression throughout the season. For each round of the regular season, their cumulative points total is shown with the overall log position in brackets.

Team	W1	W2	W3	W4	W5	W6	W7	W8	W9	QF	SF	Final
Auckland	5 (4th)	5 (7th)	10 (6th)	17 (5th)	22 (4th)	27 (2nd)	27 (5th)	28 (7th)	32 (6th)	Lost	DNQ	DNQ
Bay of Plenty	1 (8th)	5 (8th)	5 (10th)	10 (9th)	15 (7th)	20 (6th)	20 (8th)	30 (5th)	35 (4th)	Lost	DNQ	DNQ
Canterbury	5 (2nd)	10 (3rd)	15 (4th)	17 (4th)	22 (3rd)	26 (3rd)	31 (2nd)	35 (2nd)	37 (3rd)	Won	Lost	DNQ
Counties Manukau	1 (10th)	2 (11th)	7 (8th)	7 (11th)	8 (13th)	18 (8th)	18 (10th)	23 (9th)	24 (9th)	DNQ	DNQ	DNQ
Hawke's Bay	4 (7th)	13 (2nd)	18 (2nd)	18 (3rd)	18 (6th)	20 (7th)	25 (6th)	30 (6th)	34 (5th)	Won	Won	Lost
Manawatu	0 (13th)	0 (13th)	1 (14th)	11 (8th)	11 (11th)	12 (13th)	12 (13th)	12 (13th)	12 (13th)	DNQ	DNQ	DNQ
North Harbour	1 (9th)	2 (9th)	2 (11th)	3 (13th)	12 (10th)	17 (9th)	22 (7th)	22 (10th)	22 (10th)	DNQ	DNQ	DNQ
Northland	0 (14th)	2 (12th)	7 (9th)	8 (10th)	13 (8th)	13 (12th)	14 (11th)	15 (11th)	17 (12th)	DNQ	DNQ	DNQ
Otago	0 (12th)	0 (14th)	2 (13th)	7 (12th)	9 (12th)	13 (11th)	13 (12th)	13 (12th)	18 (11th)	DNQ	DNQ	DNQ
Southland	0 (11th)	2 (10th)	2 (12th)	2 (14th)	2 (14th)	3 (14th)	3 (14th)	4 (14th)	9 (14th)	DNQ	DNQ	DNQ
Taranaki	10 (1st)	15 (1st)	20 (1st)	22 (2nd)	24 (2nd)	24 (5th)	29 (4th)	33 (3rd)	38 (2nd)	Won	Won	Won
Tasman	4 (6th)	9 (4th)	10 (5th)	15 (6th)	20 (5th)	25 (4th)	30 (3rd)	31 (4th)	31 (7th)	Lost	DNQ	DNQ
Waikato	5 (3rd)	8 (6th)	8 (7th)	13 (7th)	13 (9th)	14 (10th)	19 (9th)	24 (8th)	29 (8th)	Lost	DNQ	DNQ
Wellington	4 (5th)	8 (5th)	17 (3th)	22 (1st)	27 (1st)	32 (1st)	37 (1st)	42 (1st)	43 (1st)	Won	Lost	DNQ
Key:	Win	Draw	loss	No game	DNQ = did not qualify							

== Regular season ==
During the regular season of the 2023 Bunnings NPC, each team plays 10 games over a period of nine weeks, including one mid-week game. The competition began on 4 August 2023, when Tasman hosted Otago in Nelson.

=== Week 1 ===
4 August 2023
17:35 NZST

Tasman	27–15	Otago
Try: Macca Springer (2) 6', 56'; Alex Nankivell 45'; Con: Taine Robinson (3/3) 7', 46', 57'; Pen: Taine Robinson (2/2) 49', 64'	Report	Try: Will Tucker 49'; Jake Te Hiwi 59'; Con: Sam Gilbert (1/2) 51'; Pen: Sam Gilbert (1/1) 40'

Trafalgar Park, Nelson
Referee: Angus Mabey

4 August 2023
19:35 NZST

Taranaki	37–29	Counties Manukau
Try: Teihorangi Walden 7'; Kaylum Boshier (2) 23', 56'; Kini Naholo 45'; Jacob Ratumaitavuki-Kneepkens 66'; Vereniki Tikoisolomone 76'; Con: Stephen Perofeta (2/6) 23', 57'; Pen: Stephen Perofeta (1/1) 33'	Report	Try: Kauvaka Kaivelata 3'; Etene Nanai-Seturo 29'; Alex McRobbie 72'; Jimmy Tupou 79'; Con: Riley Hohepa (3/4) 30', 73', 80'; Pen: Riley Hohepa (1/1) 53'

Yarrow Stadium, New Plymouth
Referee: Paul Williams

5 August 2023
17:05 NZST

Hawke's Bay	23–21	North Harbour
Try: Chase Tiatia 15'; Pouri Rakete-Stones 37'; Con: Lincoln McClutchie (2/2) 16', 38'; Pen: Lincoln McClutchie (3/3) 55', 70', 74'	Report	Try: Alapati Leiua (2) 1', 25'; Con: Oscar Koller (1/2) 2'; Pen: Oscar Koller (3/4) 30', 64', 72'

McLean Park, Napier
Referee: Stuart Curran

5 August 2023
19:05 NZST

Manawatu	6–22	Wellington
Pen: Brett Cameron (2/2) 38', 40+1'; Cards: Josh Taula (red card) 73'	Report	Try: Peter Umaga-Jensen 69'; Con: Aidan Morgan (1/1) 70'; Pen: Aidan Morgan (5/7) 19', 49', 66', 76', 79'

Arena Manawatu, Palmerston North
Referee: Nick Hogan

5 August 2023
19:35 NZST

Northland	11–43	Canterbury
Try: Brady Rush 9'; Con: Rivez Reihana (0/1); Pen: Rivez Reihana (2/3) 43', 51'; Cards: Brady Rush (yellow card) 59'; Rene Ranger (yellow card) 66'	Report	Try: Tahlor Cahill 34'; Blair Murray (2) 61', 71'; Ben Funnell 67'; Chay Fihaki 80+1'; Con: Fergus Burke (3/5) 35', 62', 80+2'; Pen: Fergus Burke (4/5) 14', 24', 47', 53'

Okara Park, Whangārei
Referee: Katsuki Furuse (Japan)

6 August 2023
14:05 NZST

Bay of Plenty	30–32	Auckland
Try: Manaaki Selby-Rickit 4'; Leroy Carter (2) 10', 46'; Con: Lucas Cashmore (3/3) 5', 11', 47'; Pen: Lucas Cashmore (2/2) 33', 62'; Wharenui Hawera (1/1) 75'; Cards: Alex Johnston (yellow card) 80'	Report	Try: Salesi Rayasi 50'; Corey Evans 55'; Caleb Tangitau 66'; Soane Vikena 80+1'; Con: Zarn Sullivan (3/4) 56', 67', 80+2'; Pen: Zarn Sullivan (2/2) 9', 77'

Tauranga Domain, Tauranga
Referee: Daniel Waenga

6 August 2023
16:35 NZST

Southland	21–29	Waikato
Try: Michael Manson 35'; Viliami Fine 45'; Con: Greg Dyer (1/2) 45'; Pen: Greg Dyer (3/3) 13', 40+2', 56'	Report	Try: Malachi Wrampling-Alec 3'; Pita Anae Ah-Sue 6'; Cortez Ratima (2) 19', 30'; Con: Josh Ioane (3/4) 7', 19', 31'; Pen: Taha Kemara (1/1) 80'

Rugby Park Stadium, Invercargill
Referee: Fraser Hannon

9 August 2023
19:05 NZST

Northland	13–28	Taranaki
Try: Jonah Mau'u 9'; Con: Daniel Hawkins (1/1) 10'; Pen: Daniel Hawkins (2/2) 29', 43'; Cards: Brady Rush (yellow card) 15'	Report	Try: Stephen Perofeta 16'; Jared Proffit 34'; Kaylum Boshier (2) 52', 68'; Con: Josh Jacomb (4/4) 18', 35', 53', 69'

Okara Park, Whangārei
Referee: Angus Mabey

=== Week 2 ===
11 August 2023
19:05 NZST

Counties Manukau	24–25	Hawke's Bay
Try: Hoskins Sotutu 3'; Sean Reidy 22'; Etene Nanai-Seturo 65'; Con: Riley Hohepa (3/3) 4', 23', 66'; Pen: Riley Hohepa (1/2) 78'	Report	Try: Jacob Devery 9'; Chase Tiatia 73'; Penalty try 80+4'; Con: Lincoln McClutchie (1/2) 10'; Pen: Lincoln McClutchie (2/2) 16', 26'

Navigation Homes Stadium, Pukekohe
Referee: Mike Winter

12 August 2023
14:05 NZST

Bay of Plenty	19–15	Waikato
Try: Leroy Carter 19'; Te Toiroa Tahuriorangi 39'; Lucas Cashmore 53'; Con: Lucas Cashmore (2/3) 20', 40'; Cards: Melani Nanai (yellow card) 1'	Report	Try: Malachi Wrampling-Alec 46'; Bailyn Sullivan 63'; Con: Taha Kemara (1/2) 64'; Pen: Taha Kemara (1/1) 2'; Cards: Bailyn Sullivan (yellow card) 65'

Tauranga Domain, Tauranga
Referee: Brendon Pickerill

12 August 2023
16:35 NZST

Otago	5–28	Wellington
Try: Jack Leslie 66'; Con: Sam Gilbert (0/1)	Report	Try: Peter Lakai 12'; Brad Shields 50'; Du'Plessis Kirifi 54'; Con: Aidan Morgan (2/3) 13', 51'; Pen: Aidan Morgan (3/3) 20', 40+1', 74'

Forsyth Barr Stadium, Dunedin
Referee: Jackson Henshaw

12 August 2023
19:05 NZST

Tasman	24–12	Auckland
Try: Levi Aumua 5'; Tim Sail 16'; Taine Robinson 31'; Quentin MacDonald 71'; Con: Taine Robinson (2/4) 16', 32'; Pen: Taine Robinson (0/1)	Report	Try: Salesi Rayasi (2) 50', 74'; Con: Zarn Sullivan (1/2) 52'

Lansdowne Park, Blenheim
Referee: Stuart Curran

13 August 2023
14:05 NZST

North Harbour	24–28	Canterbury
Try: Jamie Booth 5'; Lotu Inisi 65'; Con: Oscar Koller (1/2) 7'; Pen: Oscar Koller (4/4) 9', 22', 33', 39'	Report	Try: Chay Fihaki 26'; Dominic Gardiner 50'; Dallas McLeod 56'; Cullen Grace 76'; Con: Fergus Burke (1/4) 27'; Pen: Fergus Burke (2/2) 13', 18'

Onewa Domain, Takapuna
Referee: Nick Briant

13 August 2023
14:05 NZST

Southland	15–15 (a.e.t.)	Northland
Pen: Marty Banks (4/4) 23', 31', 40+4', 45'; Greg Dyer (1/1) 70'	Report	Try: Heremaia Murray (2) 57', 79'; Con: Rivez Reihana (1/2) 59'; Pen: Rivez Reihana (1/1) 18'

Rugby Park Stadium, Invercargill
Referee: Marcus Playle

13 August 2023
16:35 NZST

Manawatu	17–26	Taranaki
Try: Flyn Yates 59'; Brayden Iose 79'; Con: Brett Cameron (1/1) 60'; Isaiah Armstrong-Ravula (1/1) 80'; Pen: Brett Cameron (1/1) 16'	Report	Try: Jesse Parete 20'; Matt McKenzie 25'; Meihana Grindlay 35'; Penalty try 40'; Con: Jayson Potroz (2/3) 21', 36'; Cards: Bradley Slater (yellow card) 78'

Arena Manawatu, Palmerston North
Referee: Jonathan Bredin

16 August 2023
17:35 NZST

Hawke's Bay	35–32	Waikato
Try: Brad Weber 21'; Marino Mikaele-Tu'u 43'; Tim Farrell (2) 68', 78'; Harry Godfrey 75'; Con: Lincoln McClutchie (5/5) 22', 44', 68', 76', 79'	Report	Try: Bailyn Sullivan 8'; Liam Coombes-Fabling 25'; Austin Anderson 38'; Rhys Marshall 46'; Cody Nordstrom 54'; Con: Taha Kemara (2/5) 26', 39'; Pen: Taha Kemara (1/1) 15'

McLean Park, Napier
Referee: Angus Mabey

=== Week 3 ===
18 August 2023
19:05 NZST

Counties Manukau	32–19	Bay of Plenty
Try: Kauvaka Kaivelata 2'; Sam Tuifua 7'; Penalty try 10'; Riley Hohepa 12'; Con: Riley Hohepa (2/3) 7', 13'; Pen: Riley Hohepa (2/2) 33', 50'	Report	Try: Cole Forbes 3'; Kurt Eklund 39'; Semisi Paea 44'; Con: Lucas Cashmore (2/3) 4', 40'; Cards: Naitoa Ah Kuoi (yellow card) 10'

Navigation Homes Stadium, Pukekohe
Referee: Marcus Playle

19 August 2023
14:05 NZST

North Harbour	21–43	Auckland
Try: Wallace Sititi 56'; Danyon Morgan-Puterangi (2) 63', 80'; Con: Oscar Koller (0/3); Pen: Oscar Koller (2/2) 3', 7'	Report	Try: Kalani Thomas 9'; Zarn Sullivan (2) 22', 68'; AJ Lam 28'; Harry Plummer 51'; Caleb Tangitau 80+2'; Con: Zarn Sullivan (5/6) 10', 23', 52', 69', 80+3'; Pen: Zarn Sullivan (1/1) 40'

Onewa Domain, Takapuna
Referee: Cameron Stone

19 August 2023
14:05 NZST

RS – Wellington	39–17	Southland
Try: Pepesana Patafilo 17'; Caleb Delany 38'; Riley Higgins 48'; Dominic Ropeti 56'; Connor Garden-Bachop 62'; Josh Southall 80+3'; Con: Tjay Clarke (3/6) 18', 39', 57'; Pen: Tjay Clarke (1/1) 8'; Cards: Dominic Ropeti (yellow card) 27'	Report	Try: Semisi Tupou Ta'eiloa 29'; Leroy Ferguson 71'; Gabriel Hamer-Webb 74'; Con: Greg Dyer (1/3) 29'

Hutt Recreation Ground, Lower Hutt
Referee: Ben O'Keeffe

19 August 2023
16:35 NZST

Canterbury	68–26	Manawatu
Try: Fergus Burke 19'; Mitchell Drummond (2) 25', 42'; Manasa Mataele (2) 28', 31'; Blair Murray 48'; Rameka Poihipi (2) 54', 75'; Corey Kellow 62'; Chay Fihaki 80'; Con: Fergus Burke (6/7) 19', 25', 29', 32', 43', 50'; Alex Harford (3/3) 63', 76', 80+1'	Report	Try: Jordi Viljoen 13'; Johan Momsen 45'; Kyle Brown 50'; Raymond Tuputupu 64'; Con: Brett Cameron (2/3) 45', 51'; Isaiah Armstrong-Ravula (1/1) 65'

Rugby League Park, Christchurch
Referee: Fraser Hannon

19 August 2023
19:05 NZST

Northland	32–5	Tasman
Try: Heremaia Murray (2) 17', 46'; Liam Hallam-Eames 32'; Matt Moulds 78'; Con: Rivez Reihana (2/3) 18', 47'; Daniel Hawkins (1/1) 80'; Pen: Rivez Reihana (2/3) 6', 43'	Report	Try: Quentin MacDonald 27'; Con: Tim O'Malley (0/1)

Okara Park, Whangārei
Referee: Brendon Pickerill

20 August 2023
14:05 NZST

Hawke's Bay	33–32	Otago
Try: Devan Flanders (2) 8', 47'; Chase Tiatia 26'; Sam Smith 31'; Ollie Sapsford 39'; Con: Lincoln McClutchie (4/5) 9', 27', 31', 48'; Cards: Patrick Tuifua (yellow card) 75'	Report	Try: Christian Lio-Willie 12'; Josh Whaanga 23'; Saula Ma'u 42'; Jeremiah Asi 55'; Jack Leslie 80'; Con: Sam Gilbert (1/3) 14'; Finn Hurley (1/2) 56'; Pen: Finn Hurley (1/1) 75'; Cards: Henry Bell (yellow card) 29'

McLean Park, Napier
Referee: Nick Briant

20 August 2023
16:35 NZST

Waikato	17–29	Taranaki
Try: George Dyer 34'; Daniel Sinkinson 54'; Patrick McCurran 80+1'; Con: Taha Kemara (0/2); Tepaea Cook-Savage (1/1) 80+1'; Pen: Taha Kemara (0/1)	Report	Try: Kini Naholo (2) 27', 40+2'; Adam Lennox (2) 61', 67'; Matt McKenzie 78'; Con: Jayson Potroz (2/3) 40+3', 62'; Stephen Perofeta (0/2); Cards: Tom Florence (yellow card) 64'

Waikato Stadium, Hamilton
Referee: Daniel Waenga

23 August 2023
19:05 NZST

RS – Wellington	7–0	Tasman
Try: James O'Reilly 30'; Con: Aidan Morgan (1/1) 31'; Pen: Aidan Morgan (0/1)	Report	Pen: Tim O'Malley (0/1); Macca Springer (0/1)

Wellington Regional Stadium, Wellington
Referee: James Doleman

=== Week 4 ===
25 August 2023
19:05 NZST

Manawatu	31–30	Northland
Try: TK Howden 7'; Penalty try 12'; Leif Schwenke (2) 23', 40+1'; Brayden Iose 80+1'; Con: Brett Cameron (2/3) 9', 40+2'; Isaiah Armstrong-Ravula (0/1)	Report	Try: Matt Moulds 28'; Lisati Milo-Harris 32'; Josh Moorby 67'; Con: Rivez Reihana (2/2) 29', 33'; Daniel Hawkins (1/1) 68'; Pen: Rivez Reihana (2/2) 19', 57'; Daniel Hawkins (1/1) 74'; Cards: Heremaia Murray (yellow card) 10'; Matt Moulds (yellow card) 12'

Arena Manawatu, Palmerston North
Referee: Cameron Stone

26 August 2023
14:05 NZST

Auckland	41–22	Hawke's Bay
Try: Soane Vikena 4'; Corey Evans 10'; Josh Beehre 43'; Roger Tuivasa-Sheck 56'; Akira Ioane 68'; AJ Lam 80+2'; Con: Zarn Sullivan (3/5) 6', 44', 69'; Jock McKenzie (1/1) 80+3'; Pen: Zarn Sullivan (1/1) 23'	Report	Try: Lincoln McClutchie 28'; Tom Parsons 38'; Hisamitsu Shimada 72'; Con: Lincoln McClutchie (1/2) 39'; Harry Godfrey (1/1) 73'; Pen: Lincoln McClutchie (1/1) 20'

Eden Park, Auckland
Referee: Mike Winter

26 August 2023
16:35 NZST

Taranaki	26–29	Bay of Plenty
Try: Stephen Perofeta 17'; Kini Naholo 31'; Teihorangi Walden 36'; Michael Bent 80+2'; Con: Stephen Perofeta (3/4) 18', 36', 80+2'; Pen: Stephen Perofeta (0/1)	Report	Try: Ngarohi McGarvey-Black (2) 13', 27'; Kurt Eklund 22'; Leroy Carter 50'; Con: Lucas Cashmore (3/4) 14', 23', 52'; Pen: Lucas Cashmore (1/1) 79'; Cards: Lalomilo Lalomilo (yellow card) 60'

Yarrow Stadium, New Plymouth
Referee: Stuart Curran

26 August 2023
19:05 NZST

Otago	31–21	Southland
Try: Josh Whaanga 6'; Josh Dickson (2) 14', 32'; Ajay Faleafaga 39'; Finn Hurley 65'; Con: Finn Hurley (3/5) 15', 33', 40'	Report	Try: Michael Manson 20'; Scott Gregory 27'; Matt Whaanga 47'; Con: Dan Hollinshead (3/3) 21', 27', 48'

Forsyth Barr Stadium, Dunedin
Referee: James Doleman

27 August 2023
14:05 NZST

Canterbury	31–36	Wellington
Try: Blair Murray (3) 18', 43', 63'; Cullen Grace 51'; Ben Funnell 69'; Con: Fergus Burke (3/5) 44', 52', 70'	Report	Try: Josh Southall 12'; Losi Filipo (2) 22', 75'; Peter Umaga-Jensen 35'; Sione Halalilo 54'; Kyle Preston 57'; Con: Tjay Clarke (1/2) 13', 37'; Sam Clarke (2/4) 58'; Cards: Filo Paulo (yellow card) 67'

Rugby League Park, Christchurch
Referee: Jonathan Bredin

27 August 2023
14:05 NZST

Tasman	20–15 (a.e.t.)	North Harbour
Try: Feleti Kaitu'u 9'; Macca Springer 46'; Timoci Tavatavanawai (2) 74', 80+2'; Con: Macca Springer (0/3)	Report	Try: Tevita Mafileo 13'; Oscar Koller 18'; Henry Taefu 61'; Con: Oscar Koller (0/3); Pen: Oscar Koller (0/1); Shaun Stevenson (0/1)

Trafalgar Park, Nelson
Referee: Daniel Waenga

27 August 2023
16:35 NZST

Waikato	37–15	Counties Manukau
Try: Cortez Ratima 43'; Daniel Sinkinson (2) 51', 64'; Penalty try 58'; Quinn Tupaea 70'; Con: Tepaea Cook-Savage (2/4) 44', 70'; Pen: Tepaea Cook-Savage (2/2) 7', 25'	Report	Try: Tevita Ofa 25'; Etene Nanai-Seturo 75'; Con: Riley Hohepa (1/2) 76'; Pen: Riley Hohepa (1/1) 40+2'; Cards: Ioane Moananu (yellow card) 58'

Waikato Stadium, Hamilton
Referee: Angus Mabey

30 August 2023
19:05 NZST

Auckland	31–33	Manawatu
Try: Leni Apisai (2) 4', 46'; Salesi Rayasi 21'; Caleb Tangitau 38'; Jock McKenzie 68'; Con: Jock McKenzie (3/5) 5', 22', 39'	Report	Try: Terrell Peita 28'; Waqa Nalaga 33'; Joseph Gavigan 55'; TK Howden 71'; Julian Goerke 80'; Con: Isaiah Armstrong-Ravula (4/5) 29', 34', 57', 80+1'

Eden Park, Auckland
Referee: Nick Hogan

=== Week 5 ===
1 September 2023
19:05 NZST

Northland	44–21	Hawke's Bay
Try: Rob Cobb 25'; Sam Nock (2) 29', 37'; Tama Anderson (2) 63', 66'; Con: Rivez Reihana (4/4) 26', 31', 38', 64'; Daniel Hawkins (1/1) 67'; Pen: Rivez Reihana (3/3) 12', 50', 59'	Report	Try: Lincoln McClutchie (2) 8', 40'; Tyrone Thompson 54'; Con: Lincoln McClutchie (3/3) 9', 40+1', 55'

Okara Park, Whangārei
Referee: Maggie Cogger-Orr

2 September 2023
14:05 NZST

Bay of Plenty	38–14	Otago
Try: Richard Judd 6'; Manaaki Selby-Rickit (2) 10', 29'; Cole Forbes 14'; Lucas Cashmore 79'; Con: Lucas Cashmore (5/5) 7', 11', 15', 30', 80'; Pen: Lucas Cashmore (1/1) 77'; Cards: Naitoa Ah Kuoi (yellow card) 74'	Report	Try: Jermaine Ainsley 22'; Saula Ma'u 55'; Con: Finn Hurley (2/2) 23', 56'

Rotorua International Stadium, Rotorua
Referee: Jonathan Bredin

2 September 2023
14:05 NZST

Canterbury	29–28	Taranaki
Try: Alex Harford 28'; Ngane Punivai 39'; Billy Harmon 48'; Rameka Poihipi 55'; Con: Alex Harford (3/4) 30', 40', 56'; Pen: Alex Harford (1/1) 34'; Cards: Chay Fihaki (yellow card) 61'; Reed Prinsep (yellow card) 68'	Report	Try: Jacob Ratumaitavuki-Kneepkens 23'; Ricky Riccitelli 58'; Vereniki Tikoisolomone 63'; Stephen Perofeta 73'; Con: Jayson Potroz (1/4) 59'; Pen: Jayson Potroz (2/2) 3', 32'; Cards: Heiden Bedwell-Curtis (yellow card) 66'

Rangiora Showground Oval, Rangiora
Referee: Nick Briant

2 September 2023
16:35 NZST

North Harbour	39–17	Waikato
Try: Ben Grant 14'; Tevita Mafileo 19'; Shaun Stevenson 23'; Danyon Morgan-Puterangi 33'; Ray Niuia 64'; Lotu Inisi 70'; Con: Oscar Koller (3/6) 20', 24', 65'; Pen: Oscar Koller (1/1) 77'	Report	Try: Liam Coombes-Fabling 7'; Ollie Norris 50'; Sean Ralph 73'; Con: Tepaea Cook-Savage (0/2); Aaron Cruden (1/1) 50'

North Harbour Stadium, Albany
Referee: Nick Hogan

2 September 2023
19:05 NZST

RS – Wellington	56–25	Counties Manukau
Try: Ruben Love (2) 22', 71'; Kyle Preston 24'; Billy Proctor 33'; Isi Saumaki 36'; Du'Plessis Kirifi 63'; Kemara Hauiti-Parapara 68'; Con: Aidan Morgan (4/5) 25', 34', 38', 65'; Sam Clarke (2/2) 69', 73'; Pen: Aidan Morgan (3/3) 10', 19', 54'	Report	Try: Ioane Moananu 28'; Peniasi Malimali 40'; Liam Daniela 48'; Etene Nanai-Seturo 76'; Con: Riley Hohepa (0/3); AJ Alatimu (1/1) 76'; Pen: Riley Hohepa (1/1) 8'; Cards: Sam Tuifua (yellow card) 68'

Wellington Regional Stadium, Wellington
Referee: Stuart Curran

3 September 2023
14:05 NZST

Southland	13–41	Auckland
Try: Michael Manson 55'; Con: Dan Hollinshead (1/1) 56'; Pen: Dan Hollinshead (2/2) 8', 33'; Cards: Danny Drake (yellow card) 68'	Report	Try: AJ Lam 12'; Zarn Sullivan 20'; Kalani Thomas 38'; Xavier Tito-Harris (3) 43', 72', 77'; Vaiolini Ekuasi 51'; Con: Zarn Sullivan (3/6) 13', 21', 52'; Jock McKenzie (0/1)

Rugby Park Stadium, Invercargill
Referee: Jackson Henshaw

3 September 2023
16:35 NZST

Tasman	58–19	Manawatu
Try: Anton Segner 15'; Noah Hotham (3) 24', 28', 47'; Feleti Kaitu'u 35'; Macca Springer 36'; Shun Miyake 42'; Will Gualter 51'; Jack Gray 80'; Con: Shun Miyake (5/9) 25', 29', 37', 43', 48'; Pen: Shun Miyake (1/1) 4'	Report	Try: Slade McDowall 8'; Joseph Gavigan 69'; John Poland 75'; Con: Brett Cameron (0/1); Isaiah Armstrong-Ravula (2/2) 70', 76'

Trafalgar Park, Nelson
Referee: Marcus Playle

6 September 2023
19:05 NZST

North Harbour	27–24	Otago
Try: Sofai Maka (2) 7', 63'; Moses Leo 73'; Con: Oscar Koller (1/1) 8'; Bryn Gatland (2/2) 65', 74'; Pen: Oscar Koller (2/2) 40+1', 52'	Report	Try: Fabian Holland 4'; Josh Whaanga 21'; John Tapueluelu 33'; Jona Nareki 59'; Con: Finn Hurley (2/4) 5', 60'; Pen: Finn Hurley (0/1)

North Harbour Stadium, Albany
Referee: Mike Winter

=== Week 6 ===
8 September 2023
19:05 NZST

Waikato	24–41	Wellington
Try: Tepaea Cook-Savage 12'; Xavier Roe 26'; Daniel Sinkinson 30'; James Tucker 45'; Con: Tepaea Cook-Savage (2/4) 27', 47'; Cards: Tepaea Cook-Savage (yellow card) 59'	Report	Try: Losi Filipo (3) 5', 40', 54'; Ruben Love 16'; Hugo Plummer 35'; Xavier Numia 75'; Con: Aidan Morgan (4/6) 5', 40+1', 55', 75'; Pen: Aidan Morgan (1/1) 3'

Waikato Stadium, Hamilton
Referee: Nick Briant

9 September 2023
16:35 NZST

Counties Manukau	39–29	Southland
Try: Joshua Gray (3) 2', 37', 44'; Liam Daniela 16'; Riley Hohepa 33'; Penalty try 69'; Con: Riley Hohepa (1/3) 17'; AJ Alatimu (1/2) 38'; Pen: AJ Alatimu (1/1) 56'	Report	Try: Mike McKee 10'; Michael Manson (3) 21', 52', 64'; Gabriel Hamer-Webb 40+1'; Con: Dan Hollinshead (2/5) 40+2', 53'; Cards: Connor McLeod (yellow card) 70'

Navigation Homes Stadium, Pukekohe
Referee: Mike Winter

9 September 2023
16:35 NZST

Hawke's Bay	35–38	Bay of Plenty
Try: Tyrone Thompson 5'; Jonah Lowe 8'; Brad Weber 57'; Ollie Sapsford (2) 69', 79'; Con: Lincoln McClutchie (2/5) 6, 70'; Pen: Lincoln McClutchie (2/2) 26', 38'	Report	Try: Sekuini Tanimo 21'; Justin Sangster 32'; Pasilio Tosi 51'; Fehi Fineanganofo 60'; Manaaki Selby-Rickit 66'; Con: Wharenui Hawera (5/5) 22', 32', 52', 61', 68'; Pen: Wharenui Hawera (1/1) 36'; Cards: Seamus Bardoul (yellow card) 37'; Veveni Lasaqa (red card) 45'; Manaaki Selby-Rickit (yellow card) 78'

McLean Park, Napier
Referee: Cameron Stone

9 September 2023
19:05 NZST

Auckland	36–29	Canterbury
Try: Bryce Heem 4'; Corey Evans 13'; Kalani Thomas (2) 34', 44'; Joe Royal 78'; Con: Zarn Sullivan (4/5) 5', 35', 46', 80'; Pen: Zarn Sullivan (1/1) 67'; Cards: Josh Beehre (yellow card) 62'	Report	Try: Fergus Burke 26'; Dallas McLeod 30'; Solomon Alaimalo 40'; Penalty try 62'; Con: Fergus Burke (2/3) 27', 31'; Pen: Fergus Burke (1/1) 8'

Eden Park, Auckland

10 September 2023
14:05 NZST

Taranaki	18–29	Tasman
Try: Jayson Potroz 24'; Pita Gus Sowakula 60'; Con: Stephen Perofeta (1/2) 26'; Pen: Stephen Perofeta (2/3) 9', 67'; Cards: Jared Proffit (yellow card) 29'	Report	Try: Levi Aumua (2) 17', 44'; Timoci Tavatavanawai 40'; Anton Segner 70'; Con: Taine Robinson (3/4) 18', 45', 71'; Pen: Taine Robinson (1/1) 30'

Yarrow Stadium, New Plymouth
Referee: Angus Mabey

10 September 2023
14:35 NZST

Manawatu	29–48	North Harbour
Try: Nehe Milner-Skudder 22'; Slade McDowall 36'; Andrew Quattrin 48'; Drew Wild 67'; TK Howden 76'; Con: Brett Cameron (1/2) 24'; Isaiah Armstrong-Ravula (1/3) 49'; Cards: Slade McDowall (yellow card) 59'	Report	Try: Jed Melvin 13'; Moses Leo 16'; Tamarau McGahan 26'; Jamie Booth 30'; Danyon Morgan-Puterangi 42'; Bryn Gatland 58'; Fatongia Paea 74'; Con: Bryn Gatland (4/6) 17', 31', 43', 59'; Oscar Koller (1/1) 74'; Pen: Bryn Gatland (1/1) 6'

Arena Manawatu, Palmerston North
Referee: Tipene Cottrell

10 September 2023
16:05 NZST

Otago	30–15	Northland
Try: Will Tucker 2'; Jona Nareki 55'; Jake Te Hiwi 71'; Con: Sam Gilbert (3/3) 3', 56', 73'; Pen: Sam Gilbert (3/3) 25', 28', 51'	Report	Try: Heremaia Murray (2) 34', 61'; Con: Rivez Reihana (1/2) 62'; Pen: Rivez Reihana (1/1) 6'; Cards: Jack Goodhue (yellow card) 47'

Forsyth Barr Stadium, Dunedin
Referee: Marcus Playle

13 September 2023
19:05 NZST

Counties Manukau	31–29	Canterbury
Try: James Thompson 19'; Ioane Moananu 30'; Adam Brash 61'; Blake Makiri 80+3'; Con: AJ Alatimu (1/1) 20'; Tevita Ofa (3/3) 31', 62', 80+4'; Pen: AJ Alatimu (1/1) 23'	Report	Try: Ben Funnell 3'; Daniel Lienert-Brown 39'; Tom Christie 50'; Cullen Grace 53'; Con: Fergus Burke (3/4) 4', 40', 54'; Pen: Fergus Burke (1/1) 18'; Cards: Tom Christie (yellow card) 80'

Navigation Homes Stadium, Pukekohe
Referee: Nick Hogan

=== Week 7 ===
15 September 2023
19:05 NZST

Hawke's Bay	57–7	Manawatu
Try: Sam Smith 6'; Marino Mikaele-Tu'u (2) 9', 68'; Brad Weber (2) 14', 19'; Nick Grigg 47'; Ollie Sapsford 55'; Sam Wye 72'; Con: Lincoln McClutchie (7/8) 7', 10', 15', 20', 48', 69', 73'; Pen: Lincoln McClutchie (1/1) 12'	Report	Try: Beaudein Waaka 23'; Con: Isaiah Armstrong-Ravula (1/1) 24'; Cards: TK Howden (yellow card) 12'

McLean Park, Napier
Referee: Fraser Hannon

16 September 2023
14:05 NZST

Auckland	12–27	Waikato
Try: Vaiolini Ekuasi 24'; Zarn Sullivan 69'; Con: Zarn Sullivan (1/2) 69'; Pen: Zarn Sullivan (0/1); Cards: Xavier Tito-Harris (yellow card) 37'	Report	Try: Aki Tuivailala 10'; Xavier Roe (3) 30', 37', 65'; Con: Tepaea Cook-Savage (2/4) 31', 66'; Pen: Tepaea Cook-Savage (0/1); Drop: Tepaea Cook-Savage (1/1) 59'

Bell Park, Pakuranga
Referee: Jonathan Bredin

16 September 2023
16:35 NZST

North Harbour	50–31	Northland
Try: Shaun Stevenson (2) 8', 33'; Kade Banks (2) 19', 40+2'; Tevita Mafileo 57'; Lotu Inisi (2) 68', 73'; Con: Bryn Gatland (6/7) 9', 20', 34', 58', 69', 74'; Pen: Bryn Gatland (1/1) 66'	Report	Try: Josh Moorby 30'; Heremaia Murray 45'; Rivez Reihana 47'; Jonah Mau'u 51'; Con: Rivez Reihana (4/4) 32', 46', 48', 52'; Pen: Rivez Reihana (1/2) 27'

North Harbour Stadium, Albany
Referee: Cameron Stone

16 September 2023
19:05 NZST

Otago	17–36	Taranaki
Try: Jona Nareki 16'; Con: Sam Gilbert (0/1); Pen: Sam Gilbert (4/4) 26', 37', 40+2', 56'; Cards: Tom Sanders (yellow card) 52'	Report	Try: Logan Crowley 2'; Bradley Slater 52'; Adam Lennox 60'; Jacob Ratumaitavuki-Kneepkens 69'; Josh Jacomb 78'; Con: Stephen Perofeta (4/5) 3', 54', 71', 79'; Pen: Stephen Perofeta (1/2) 45'

Forsyth Barr Stadium, Dunedin
Referee: Daniel Waenga

17 September 2023
14:05 NZST

Bay of Plenty	14–26	Wellington
Try: Penitoa Finau 30'; Reon Paul 56'; Con: Wharenui Hawera (2/2) 31', 57'	Report	Try: Losi Filipo 16'; Siale Lauaki 20'; Brad Shields 40+1'; Penieli Poasa 77'; Con: Aidan Morgan (3/4) 17', 21', 40+2'

Rotorua International Stadium, Rotorua
Referee: Angus Mabey

17 September 2023
14:05 NZST

Canterbury	29–14	Southland
Try: Fergus Burke 13'; Ngane Punivai 18'; George Bell 61'; Willi Heinz 67'; Con: Fergus Burke (3/4) 19', 62', 68'; Pen: Fergus Burke (1/1) 69'	Report	Try: Nic Souchon 30'; Danny Drake 42'; Con: Dan Hollinshead (2/2) 31', 43'

Rugby League Park, Christchurch
Referee: Fraser Hannon

17 September 2023
16:35 NZST

Tasman	27–17	Counties Manukau
Try: Timoci Tavatavanawai 29'; Taine Robinson 38'; Will Gualter 54'; Quentin MacDonald 63'; Seta Baker 68'; Con: Taine Robinson (1/5) 69'	Report	Try: Ian West-Stevens 13'; Sean Reidy 72'; Con: Tevita Ofa (2/2) 15', 72'; Pen: Tevita Ofa (1/1) 25'

Lansdowne Park, Blenheim
Referee: Jackson Henshaw

=== Week 8 ===
22 September 2023
19:05 NZST

Northland	26–32	Bay of Plenty
Try: Tamati Tua 3'; Heremaia Murray 60'; Con: Rivez Reihana (2/2) 4', 61'; Pen: Rivez Reihana (3/3) 10', 26', 35'; Daniel Hawkins (1/1) 73'; Cards: Jonah Mau'u (yellow card) 18'	Report	Try: Kurt Eklund 21'; Manaaki Selby-Rickit 31'; Fehi Fineanganofo 66'; Josh Bartlett 78'; Con: Wharenui Hawera (3/4) 32', 67', 79'; Pen: Wharenui Hawera (2/2) 7', 40+1'

Okara Park, Whangārei
Referee: Mike Winter

23 September 2023
14:05 NZST

Counties Manukau	46–19	Manawatu
Try: Suetena Asomua 16'; Joshua Gray (2) 29', 52'; Sean Reidy 31'; Ian West-Stevens 38'; Etene Nanai-Seturo 41'; Ioane Moananu (2) 57', 61'; Con: Tevita Ofa (3/8) 17', 39', 63'	Report	Try: Brayden Iose (2) 2', 80+2'; James Tofa 26'; Con: Isaiah Armstrong-Ravula (2/2) 4', 27'; Beaudein Waaka (0/1)

Navigation Homes Stadium, Pukekohe
Referee: Jonathan Bredin

23 September 2023
14:05 NZST

Southland	7–33	Hawke's Bay
Try: Tevita Latu 7'; Con: Greg Dyer (1/1) 8'	Report; Report	Try: Tyrone Thompson 11'; Marino Mikaele-Tu'u 24'; Josh Kaifa (2) 38', 74'; Brad Weber 49'; Con: Lincoln McClutchie (3/4) 25', 39', 50'; Caleb Makene (1/1) 75'

Rugby Park Stadium, Invercargill
Referee: Marcus Playle

23 September 2023
16:35 NZST

Canterbury	30–28	Tasman
Try: Tom Christie 17'; Manasa Mataele 29'; Solomon Alaimalo 34'; Con: Fergus Burke (3/3) 18', 30', 35'; Pen: Fergus Burke (3/3) 7', 13', 63'	Report	Try: Macca Springer 38'; Timoci Tavatavanawai 53'; Taine Robinson 58'; Con: Taine Robinson (2/3) 39', 54'; Pen: Taine Robinson (3/3) 22', 40+2', 74'

Rugby League Park, Christchurch
Referee: Stuart Curran

23 September 2023
19:05 NZST

Taranaki	18–16	Auckland
Try: Ricky Riccitelli 8'; Tom Florence 39'; Con: Jayson Potroz (1/2) 40'; Pen: Jayson Potroz (1/2) 47'; Josh Jacomb (1/1) 67'	Report	Try: Salesi Rayasi 21'; Con: Zarn Sullivan (1/1) 23'; Pen: Zarn Sullivan (3/4) 10', 15', 28'; Drop: Zarn Sullivan (0/1)

Yarrow Stadium, New Plymouth
Referee: Nick Briant

24 September 2023
14:05 NZST

RS – Wellington	26–6	North Harbour
Try: Losi Filipo 14'; Billy Proctor 28'; Aidan Morgan 44'; Ruben Love 71'; Con: Aidan Morgan (3/4) 16', 29', 72'; Cards: Billy Proctor (yellow card) 68'	Report	Pen: Bryn Gatland (2/2) 25', 40+1'

Jerry Collins Stadium, Porirua
Referee: Daniel Waenga

24 September 2023
16:35 NZST

Waikato	47–7	Otago
Try: Aaron Cruden (2) 14', 25'; Pita Anae Ah-Sue 31'; Samipeni Finau 37'; Simon Parker 59'; Austin Anderson 69'; Tepaea Cook-Savage 75'; Con: Aaron Cruden (5/6) 15', 27', 32', 38', 70'; Daniel Sinkinson (1/1) 76'	Report	Try: Fabian Holland 78'; Con: Sam Gilbert (1/1) 79'

Waikato Stadium, Hamilton
Referee: Angus Mabey

27 September 2023
19:05 NZST

Southland	23–25	Bay of Plenty
Try: Jay Renton 20'; Viliami Fine 30'; Tevita Latu 36'; Con: Marty Banks (0/2); Dan Hollinshead (1/1) 37'; Pen: Dan Hollinshead (2/4) 40+1', 76'	Report	Try: Fehi Fineanganofo 3'; Manaaki Selby-Rickit 12'; Kurt Eklund 57'; Naitoa Ah Kuoi 63'; Con: Wharenui Hawera (1/4) 64'; Pen: Wharenui Hawera (1/1) 78'

Rugby Park Stadium, Invercargill
Referee: Fraser Hannon

=== Week 9 ===
29 September 2023
19:05 NZST

Auckland	27–26	Northland
Try: Che Clark 19'; Josh Beehre 32'; Marcel Renata 80+2'; Con: Zarn Sullivan (3/3) 20', 33', 80+2'; Pen: Zarn Sullivan (2/3) 7', 63'	Report	Try: Jordan Trainor 22'; Rob Rush 26'; Tamati Tua 38'; Jordan Olsen 67'; Con: Rivez Reihana (2/3) 27', 40'; Daniel Hawkins (1/1) 68'; Cards: Liam Hallam-Eames (yellow card) 15'; Sam Caird (yellow card) 31'

Eden Park, Auckland
Referee: Daniel Waenga

30 September 2023
14:05 NZST

Waikato	37–35	Canterbury
Try: Malachi Wrampling-Alec 6'; Tepaea Cook-Savage 13'; Gideon Wrampling (2) 20', 49'; Xavier Roe 38'; James Tucker 68'; Con: Aaron Cruden (0/1); Tepaea Cook-Savage (2/5) 50', 68'; Pen: Tepaea Cook-Savage (1/1) 72'	Report	Try: Dominic Gardiner 4'; Dallas McLeod 28'; Oli Jager 34'; Mitchell Drummond 59'; Ben Funnell 76'; Con: Fergus Burke (5/5) 5', 29', 35', 60', 76'; Pen: Fergus Burke (0/1)

Waikato Stadium, Hamilton
Referee: Cameron Stone

30 September 2023
14:05 NZST

Wellington	18–20	Hawke's Bay – RS
Try: Xavier Numia 14'; Penieli Poasa 74'; Con: Aidan Morgan (1/2) 15'; Pen: Aidan Morgan (2/2) 40+1', 63'; Drop: Connor Garden-Bachop (0/1)	Report	Try: Ollie Sapsford 17'; Jonah Lowe 57'; Sam Smith 78'; Con: Lincoln McClutchie (1/3) 79'; Pen: Lincoln McClutchie (1/1) 27'

Wellington Regional Stadium, Wellington
Referee: Nick Briant

30 September 2023
19:05 NZST

Taranaki	54–21	North Harbour
Try: Tom Franklin 5'; Bradley Slater 20'; Josh Jacomb (2) 36', 57'; Jacob Ratumaitavuki-Kneepkens (2) 40+1', 50'; Ricky Riccitelli (2) 73', 79'; Con: Josh Jacomb (7/8) 6', 22', 38', 40+3', 51', 58', 80+1'	Report	Try: Tom Barham 48'; Kade Banks (2) 53', 67'; Con: Bryn Gatland (3/3) 49', 54', 68'

Yarrow Stadium, New Plymouth
Referee: Mike Winter

1 October 2023
14:05 NZST

Bay of Plenty	41–12	Tasman
Try: Naitoa Ah Kuoi 27'; Manaaki Selby-Rickit 40+2'; Josh Bartlett 54'; Melani Nanai 57'; Te Toiroa Tahuriorangi 71'; Tamiro Armstrong 80+2'; Con: Wharenui Hawera (4/6) 28', 40+3', 72', 80+3'; Pen: Wharenui Hawera (1/2) 21'	Report	Try: Alex Nankivell 46'; Quentin MacDonald 63'; Con: Taine Robinson (1/2) 64'; Cards: Max Hicks (yellow card) 40+1'

Tauranga Domain, Tauranga
Referee: Jonathan Bredin

1 October 2023
14:05 NZST

Otago	38–22	Counties Manukau
Try: Finn Hurley 25'; John Tapueluelu 38'; Sam Gilbert 48'; Josh Whaanga 52'; Will Stodart 71'; Jeremiah Asi 80+1'; Con: Sam Gilbert (4/5) 26', 39', 50', 53'; Josh Dickson (0/1)	Report; Report	Try: Joshua Gray 21'; Etene Nanai-Seturo 33'; Ioane Moananu 64'; Blake Makiri 77'; Con: Tevita Ofa (1/4) 34'

Forsyth Barr Stadium, Dunedin
Referee: Maggie Cogger-Orr

1 October 2023
16:35 NZST

Manawatu	12–37	Southland
Try: John Poland 26'; Brayden Iose 50'; Con: Beaudein Waaka (1/2) 51'	Report	Try: Jay Renton (2) 18', 40'; Tevita Latu 44'; Scott Gregory 76'; Matt Whaanga 80'; Con: Marty Banks (3/3) 19', 40+1', 45'; Dan Hollinshead (0/2); Pen: Marty Banks (1/1) 47'; Dan Hollinshead (1/1) 68'

Arena Manawatu, Palmerston North
Referee: Stu Catley

== Play-offs ==
The play-off fixtures are as follows:

Quarter-finals
1	Wellington	32
8	Waikato	28
4	Bay of Plenty	28
5	Hawke's Bay	38
2	Taranaki	34
7	Tasman	18
3	Canterbury	29
6	Auckland	24

Semi-finals
Wellington	24
Hawke's Bay	25
Taranaki	23
Canterbury	16

Final
Hawke's Bay	19
Taranaki	22

=== Quarter-finals ===
6 October 2023
19:05 NZST

Canterbury	29–24	Auckland
Try: Solomon Alaimalo 32'; George Bell 45'; Chay Fihaki 53'; Blair Murray 76'; Con: Rameka Poihipi (3/4) 33', 45', 54'; Pen: Rameka Poihipi (1/2) 14'	Report	Try: Josh Beehre (2) 16', 69'; Salesi Rayasi 42'; AJ Lam 80'; Con: Zarn Sullivan (2/3) 17', 70'; Taufa Funaki (0/1); Pen: Zarn Sullivan (0/1)

Rugby League Park, Christchurch
Referee: Nick Briant

7 October 2023
16:35 NZST

Wellington	32–28	Waikato
Try: Julian Savea 10'; Riley Higgins 26'; James O'Reilly 38'; Du'Plessis Kirifi 56'; Con: Aidan Morgan (3/4) 27', 39', 57'; Pen: Aidan Morgan (2/4) 4', 33'	Report	Try: James Tucker 14'; Pita Anae Ah-Sue 43'; Tana Tuhakaraina 64'; Sean Ralph 74'; Con: Tepaea Cook-Savage (2/2) 15', 44'; Taha Kemara (2/2) 65', 75'

Wellington Regional Stadium, Wellington
Referee: Daniel Waenga

7 October 2023
19:05 NZST

Taranaki	34–18	Tasman
Try: Vereniki Tikoisolomone 11'; Jacob Ratumaitavuki-Kneepkens 43'; Tom Florence 52'; Penalty try 55'; Con: Josh Jacomb (3/3) 12', 44', 53'; Pen: Josh Jacomb (2/3) 20', 40'	Report	Try: Timoci Tavatavanawai 15'; Max Hicks 71'; Con: Taine Robinson (1/2) 17'; Pen: Taine Robinson (2/3) 30', 34'; Cards: Alex Nankivell (yellow card) 55'

Yarrow Stadium, New Plymouth
Referee: Stuart Curran

8 October 2023
14:05 NZST

Bay of Plenty	28–38	Hawke's Bay
Try: Naitoa Ah Kuoi 12'; Manaaki Selby-Rickit (2) 18', 32'; Leroy Carter 22'; Con: Wharenui Hawera (4/4) 13', 19', 24', 33'	Report	Try: Pouri Rakete-Stones 9'; Jonah Lowe 26'; Tyrone Thompson (2) 40', 55'; Lolagi Visinia 67'; Chase Tiatia 74'; Con: Lincoln McClutchie (4/6) 11', 40+2', 69', 76'

Tauranga Domain, Tauranga
Referee: Angus Mabey

=== Semi-finals ===
13 October 2023
19:05 NZST

Taranaki	23–16	Canterbury
Try: Adam Lennox 14'; Con: Josh Jacomb (0/1); Pen: Josh Jacomb (4/4) 7', 30', 43', 50'; Stephen Perofeta (2/2) 74', 78'	Report	Try: Rameka Poihipi 57'; Con: Alex Harford (1/1) 58'; Pen: Alex Harford (3/3) 4', 11', 39'

Yarrow Stadium, New Plymouth
Referee: Stuart Curran

14 October 2023
19:05 NZST

Wellington	24–25	Hawke's Bay
Try: Billy Proctor 47'; Dominic Ropeti 80'; Riley Higgins 80+4'; Con: Aidan Morgan (1/1) 48'; Ruben Love (2/2) 80', 80+5'; Pen: Aidan Morgan (1/2) 14'; Cards: Brad Shields (yellow card) 16'	Report	Try: Chase Tiatia (3) 22', 39', 54'; Con: Lincoln McClutchie (2/3) 40+1', 55'; Pen: Lincoln McClutchie (2/2) 17', 33'; Cards: Sam Wye (yellow card) 80'

Wellington Regional Stadium, Wellington
Referee: Cameron Stone

=== Final ===
21 October 2023
14:05 NZST

Taranaki	22–19	Hawke's Bay
Try: Meihana Grindlay 2'; Daniel Rona 11'; Adam Lennox 48'; Con: Josh Jacomb (2/3) 3', 49'; Pen: Josh Jacomb (1/1) 40+2'; Stephen Perofeta (0/2)	Report	Try: Lolagi Visinia 24'; Tom Parsons 34'; Geoff Cridge 54'; Con: Lincoln McClutchie (2/3) 25', 35'; Pen: Lincoln McClutchie (0/1)

Yarrow Stadium, New Plymouth
Referee: Angus Mabey

Taranaki	Hawke's Bay

FB	15	Stephen Perofeta
RW	14	Jacob Ratumaitavuki-Kneepkens
OC	13	Meihana Grindlay
IC	12	Daniel Rona
LW	11	Kini Naholo	(substituted off) 69'
FH	10	Josh Jacomb	(substituted off) 56'
SH	9	Adam Lennox	(substituted off) 69'
N8	8	Kaylum Boshier (c)	(substituted off) 74'
OF	7	Tom Florence
BF	6	Pita Gus Sowakula
RL	5	Josh Lord	(substituted off) 66'
LL	4	Tom Franklin	(substituted off) 60'
TP	3	Reuben O'Neill	(substituted off) 56'
HK	2	Bradley Slater	(substituted off) 60'	(substituted on) 74'
LP	1	Jared Proffit		(substituted off) 74'
Replacements:
HK	16	Ricky Riccitelli	(substituted on) 60'
PR	17	Donald Brighouse	(substituted on) 74'
PR	18	Michael Bent	(substituted on) 56'
LK	19	Heiden Bedwell-Curtis	(substituted on) 66'
FL	20	Michael Loft	(substituted on) 60'
SH	21	Logan Crowley	(substituted on) 69'
FH	22	Jayson Potroz	(substituted on) 56'
WG	23	Vereniki Tikoisolomone	(substituted on) 69'

FB	15	Lolagi Visinia	(substituted off) 74'
RW	14	Ollie Sapsford
OC	13	Nick Grigg	(substituted off) 56'
IC	12	Chase Tiatia
LW	11	Jonah Lowe
FH	10	Lincoln McClutchie
SH	9	Brad Weber	(substituted off) 66'
N8	8	Devan Flanders
OF	7	Josh Kaifa	(substituted off) 40+2'
BF	6	Marino Mikaele-Tu'u
RL	5	Tom Parsons (c)
LL	4	Geoff Cridge	(substituted off) 66'
TP	3	Joel Hintz	(substituted off) 66'
HK	2	Tyrone Thompson	(substituted off) 48'
LP	1	Pouri Rakete-Stones	(substituted off) 60'
Replacements:
HK	16	Jacob Devery	(substituted on) 48'
PR	17	Tim Farrell	(substituted on) 60'
PR	18	Joe Apikotoa	(substituted on) 66'
LK	19	Frank Lochore	(substituted on) 66'
FL	20	Sam Smith	(substituted on) 40+2'
SH	21	Folau Fakatava	(substituted on) 66'
CE	22	Stacey Ili	(substituted on) 56'
FB	23	Caleb Makene	(substituted on) 74'

== Statistics ==
=== Leading point scorers ===
No.	Player	Team	Points	Average	Details
1	Lincoln McClutchie	Hawke's Bay	125	9.62	3 T, 37 C, 12 P, 0 D
2	Fergus Burke	Canterbury	109	10.09	3 T, 29 C, 12 P, 0 D
3	Aidan Morgan	Wellington	102	8.50	1 T, 23 C, 17 P, 0 D
3	Zarn Sullivan	Auckland	102	10.20	4 T, 26 C, 10 P, 0 D
5	Rivez Reihana	Northland	86	8.60	1 T, 18 C, 15 P, 0 D
6	Josh Jacomb	Taranaki	71	8.88	3 T, 16 C, 8 P, 0 D
7	Taine Robinson	Tasman	65	7.22	3 T, 13 C, 8 P, 0 D
8	Wharenui Hawera	Bay of Plenty	56	5.09	0 T, 19 C, 6 P, 0 D
9	Oscar Koller	North Harbour	55	6.88	1 T, 7 C, 12 P, 0 D
10	Stephen Perofeta	Taranaki	53	5.89	3 T, 10 C, 6 P, 0 D

Source: The weekly reviews of the matches published on provincial.rugby (see "Report" in the individual match scoring stats).

=== Leading try scorers ===
No.	Player	Team	Tries	Average
1	Manaaki Selby-Rickit	Bay of Plenty	9	0.82
2	Heremaia Murray	Northland	8	0.80
3	Losi Filipo	Wellington	7	0.70
3	Blair Murray	Canterbury	7	1.00
3	Chase Tiatia	Hawke's Bay	7	0.58
6	Joshua Gray	Counties Manukau	6	0.86
6	Michael Manson	Southland	6	1.00
6	Etene Nanai-Seturo	Counties Manukau	6	0.75
6	Jacob Ratumaitavuki-Kneepkens	Taranaki	6	0.46
6	Salesi Rayasi	Auckland	6	0.67
6	Timoci Tavatavanawai	Tasman	6	0.55

Source: The weekly reviews of the matches published on provincial.rugby (see "Report" in the individual match scoring stats).

=== Points by game ===
Team	1		2		3		4		5		6		7		8		9		10		Total		Average	
Auckland	32	30	12	24	43	21	41	22	31	33	41	13	36	29	12	27	16	18	27	26	291	243	29.10	24.30
Bay of Plenty	30	32	19	15	19	32	29	26	38	14	38	35	14	26	32	26	25	23	41	12	285	241	28.50	24.10
Canterbury	43	11	28	24	68	26	31	36	29	28	29	36	29	31	29	14	30	28	35	37	351	271	35.10	27.10
Counties Manukau	29	37	24	25	32	19	15	37	25	56	39	29	31	29	17	27	46	19	22	38	280	316	28.00	31.60
Hawke's Bay	23	21	25	24	35	32	33	32	22	41	21	44	35	38	57	7	33	7	20	18	304	264	30.40	26.40
Manawatu	6	22	17	26	26	68	31	30	33	31	19	58	29	48	7	57	19	46	12	37	199	423	19.90	42.30
North Harbour	21	23	24	28	21	43	15	20	39	17	27	24	48	29	50	31	6	26	21	54	272	295	27.20	29.50
Northland	11	43	13	28	15	15	32	5	30	31	44	21	15	30	31	50	26	32	26	27	243	282	24.30	28.20
Otago	15	27	5	28	32	33	31	21	14	38	24	27	30	15	17	36	7	47	38	22	213	294	21.30	29.40
Southland	21	29	15	15	17	39	21	31	13	41	29	39	14	29	7	33	23	25	37	12	197	293	19.70	29.30
Taranaki	37	29	28	13	26	17	29	17	26	29	28	29	18	29	36	17	18	16	54	21	300	217	30.00	21.70
Tasman	27	15	24	12	5	32	0	7	20	15	58	19	29	18	27	17	28	30	12	41	230	206	23.00	20.60
Waikato	29	21	15	19	32	35	17	29	37	15	17	39	24	41	27	12	47	7	37	35	282	253	28.20	25.30
Wellington	22	6	28	5	39	17	7	0	36	31	56	25	41	24	26	14	26	6	18	20	299	148	29.90	14.80

Source: Bunnings NPC Fixtures and Results 2023

=== Tries by game ===
Team	1		2		3		4		5		6		7		8		9		10		Total		Average	
Auckland	4	3	2	4	6	3	6	3	5	5	7	1	5	4	2	4	1	2	3	4	41	33	4.10	3.30
Bay of Plenty	3	4	3	2	3	4	4	4	5	2	5	5	2	4	4	2	4	3	6	2	39	32	3.90	3.20
Canterbury	5	1	4	2	10	4	5	6	4	4	4	5	4	4	4	2	3	3	5	6	48	37	4.80	3.70
Counties Manukau	4	6	3	3	4	3	2	5	4	7	6	5	4	4	2	5	8	3	4	6	41	47	4.10	4.70
Hawke's Bay	2	2	3	3	5	5	5	5	3	6	3	5	5	5	8	1	5	1	3	2	42	35	4.20	3.50
Manawatu	0	1	2	4	4	10	5	3	5	5	3	9	5	7	1	8	3	8	2	5	30	60	3.00	6.00
North Harbour	2	2	2	4	3	6	3	4	6	3	3	4	7	5	7	4	0	4	3	8	36	44	3.60	4.40
Northland	1	5	1	4	2	0	4	1	3	5	5	3	2	3	4	7	2	4	4	3	28	35	2.80	3.50
Otago	2	3	1	3	5	5	5	3	2	5	4	3	3	2	1	5	1	7	6	4	30	40	3.00	4.00
Southland	2	4	0	2	3	6	3	5	1	7	5	6	2	4	1	5	3	4	5	2	25	45	2.50	4.50
Taranaki	6	4	4	1	4	2	5	3	4	4	4	4	2	4	5	1	2	1	8	3	44	27	4.40	2.70
Tasman	3	2	4	2	1	4	0	1	4	3	9	3	4	2	5	2	3	3	2	6	35	28	3.50	2.80
Waikato	4	2	2	3	5	5	3	5	5	2	3	6	4	6	4	2	7	1	6	5	43	37	4.30	3.70
Wellington	1	0	3	1	6	3	1	0	6	5	7	4	6	4	4	2	4	0	2	3	40	22	4.00	2.20

For	Against

Source: The weekly reviews of the matches published on provincial.rugby (see "Report" in the individual match scoring stats).

=== Discipline ===
Player	Team	(red card) Red	(yellow card) Yellow	Week (opponent)
Josh Taula	Manawatu	1	0	(red card) Week 1 (vs. Wellington)
Veveni Lasaqa	Bay of Plenty	1	0	(red card) Week 6 (vs. Hawke's Bay)
Naitoa Ah Kuoi	Bay of Plenty	0	2	(yellow card) Week 3 (vs. Counties Manukau); (yellow card) Week 5 (vs. Otago)
Brady Rush	Northland	0	2	(yellow card) Week 1 (vs. Canterbury); (yellow card) Week 1 (vs. Taranaki)
Seamus Bardoul	Bay of Plenty	0	1	(yellow card) Week 6 (vs. Hawke's Bay)
Josh Beehre	Auckland	0	1	(yellow card) Week 6 (vs. Canterbury)
Henry Bell	Otago	0	1	(yellow card) Week 3 (vs. Hawke's Bay)
Sam Caird	Northland	0	1	(yellow card) Week 9 (vs. Auckland)
Tom Christie	Canterbury	0	1	(yellow card) Week 6 (vs. Counties Manukau)
Tepaea Cook-Savage	Waikato	0	1	(yellow card) Week 6 (vs. Wellington)
Danny Drake	Southland	0	1	(yellow card) Week 5 (vs. Auckland)
Chay Fihaki	Canterbury	0	1	(yellow card) Week 5 (vs. Taranaki)
Tom Florence	Taranaki	0	1	(yellow card) Week 3 (vs. Waikato)
Jack Goodhue	Northland	0	1	(yellow card) Week 6 (vs. Otago)
Liam Hallam-Eames	Northland	0	1	(yellow card) Week 9 (vs. Auckland)
Max Hicks	Tasman	0	1	(yellow card) Week 9 (vs. Bay of Plenty)
TK Howden	Manawatu	0	1	(yellow card) Week 7 (vs. Hawke's Bay)
Alex Johnston	Bay of Plenty	0	1	(yellow card) Week 1 (vs. Auckland)
Lalomilo Lalomilo	Bay of Plenty	0	1	(yellow card) Week 4 (vs. Taranaki)
Jonah Mau'u	Northland	0	1	(yellow card) Week 8 (vs. Bay of Plenty)
Slade McDowall	Manawatu	0	1	(yellow card) Week 6 (vs. North Harbour)
Connor McLeod	Southland	0	1	(yellow card) Week 6 (vs. Counties Manukau)
Ioane Moananu	Counties Manukau	0	1	(yellow card) Week 4 (vs. Waikato)
Matt Moulds	Northland	0	1	(yellow card) Week 4 (vs. Manawatu)
Heremaia Murray	Northland	0	1	(yellow card) Week 4 (vs. Manawatu)
Melani Nanai	Bay of Plenty	0	1	(yellow card) Week 2 (vs. Waikato)
Alex Nankivell	Tasman	0	1	(yellow card) Quarter-final (vs. Taranaki)
Filo Paulo	Wellington	0	1	(yellow card) Week 4 (vs. Canterbury)
Reed Prinsep	Canterbury	0	1	(yellow card) Week 5 (vs. Taranaki)
Billy Proctor	Wellington	0	1	(yellow card) Week 8 (vs. North Harbour)
Jared Proffit	Taranaki	0	1	(yellow card) Week 6 (vs. Tasman)
Rene Ranger	Northland	0	1	(yellow card) Week 1 (vs. Canterbury)
Dominic Ropeti	Wellington	0	1	(yellow card) Week 3 (vs. Southland)
Tom Sanders	Otago	0	1	(yellow card) Week 7 (vs. Taranaki)
Manaaki Selby-Rickit	Bay of Plenty	0	1	(yellow card) Week 6 (vs. Hawke's Bay)
Brad Shields	Wellington	0	1	(yellow card) Semi-final (vs. Hawke's Bay)
Bradley Slater	Taranaki	0	1	(yellow card) Week 2 (vs. Manawatu)
Bailyn Sullivan	Waikato	0	1	(yellow card) Week 2 (vs. Bay of Plenty)
Xavier Tito-Harris	Auckland	0	1	(yellow card) Week 7 (vs. Waikato)
Patrick Tuifua	Hawke's Bay	0	1	(yellow card) Week 3 (vs. Otago)
Sam Tuifua	Counties Manukau	0	1	(yellow card) Week 5 (vs. Wellington)
Sam Wye	Hawke's Bay	0	1	(yellow card) Semi-final (vs. Wellington)

== Ranfurly Shield ==
=== Pre-season challenges ===
For the 2023 pre-season, Wellington accepted Ranfurly Shield challenges from Horowhenua-Kapiti and 2022 Meads Cup winners South Canterbury.

12 July 2023
14:05 NZST

Horowhenua-Kapiti	7–68	Wellington
Try: Malaki Masoe 77'; Con: Connor Paki (1/1) 79'	Report	Try: Sione Halalilo 8'; Hugo Plummer 21'; Asafo Aumua 26'; Isi Saumaki (2) 34', 40'; Louis Northcott 45'; Joe Faleafaga 56'; Sam Clarke 63'; Kaliopasi Uluilakepa 71'; TJ Clarke 74'; Con: Aidan Morgan (9/10) 9', 22', 28', 35', 40+1', 46', 57', 72', 75'; Cards: Asafo Aumua (yellow card) 49'

Levin Domain, Levin
Referee: Natarsha Ganley

19 July 2023
14:05 NZST

Wellington	67–21	South Canterbury
Try: Sione Halalilo 2'; Keelan Whitman 5'; Asafo Aumua (4) 22', 26', 40+2', 48'; Losi Filipo 29'; Isi Saumaki (2) 41', 72'; TJ Clarke 45'; Pepesana Patafilo 70'; Con: Aidan Morgan (5/9) 6', 27', 30', 40+3', 42'; TJ Clarke (1/2) 71'	Report	Try: Paula Fifita 35'; Siu Kakala (2) 65', 79'; Con: Sam Briggs (3/3) 36', 66', 80'

Hutt Recreation Ground, Lower Hutt
Referee: Daniel Waenga
