= Geoff Cridge =

New Zealand rugby union player

- Full name: Geoffrey Owen Cridge
- Born: 6 February 1995 (age 31) Christchurch, New Zealand
- Height: 2.00 m (6 ft 7 in)
- Weight: 114 kg (251 lb; 17 st 13 lb)
- School: Christchurch Boys' High School

Rugby union career
- Position(s): Lock, Flanker
- Current team: Hawke's Bay
Senior career
| Years | Team | Apps | (Points) |
| 2014− | Hawke's Bay | 93 | (40) |
| 2015–2019 | Hurricanes | 1 | (0) |
| 2022 | Waratahs | 11 | (0) |
| 2022–2023 | Bayonne | 9 | (0) |
| 2025 | Green Rockets Tokatsu | 10 | (0) |
- Correct as of 5 November 2025
International career
| Years | Team | Apps | (Points) |
| 2014–2015 | New Zealand U20 | 8 | (10) |
- Correct as of 30 October 2016

Geoffrey Cridge (born 6 February 1995) is a New Zealand rugby union player, who currently plays as a lock or loose forward for Hawke's Bay in New Zealand's domestic National Provincial Championship and Green Rockets Tokatsu in Japan Rugby League One. He previously played for the Hurricanes and the Waratahs in Super Rugby as well as for Bayonne in the French Top 14.

== Early career ==
Born and raised in the city of Christchurch, Cridge was educated at the prestigious Christchurch Boys' High School where he played first XV rugby for 2 years. During his high school years, he also represented Canterbury at under-15, under-16 and under-18 level before heading north to Hawke's Bay after graduation to start playing club rugby for Hastings.

== Senior career ==
After initially being a member of the Hawke's Bay development and under-20 sides, Cridge graduated to the senior team to make one appearance during the 2014 ITM Cup. Injury ruled him out of the Magpies promotion winning season of 2015, but he bounced back in 2016 to claim a place as a regular in the starting XV. Helped out by an injury to established lock Michael Allardice, Cridge stepped up to partner Hurricanes team-mate Mark Abbott in the Magpies second row. He played all 10 of Hawke's Bay's games during the 2016 season and contributed 2 tries.

During the following seasons, Cridge cemented himself in the Magpies' starting line-up. During the 2020 Mitre 10 Cup season, the Magpies won the Ranfurly Shield (taking it off Otago), were successful in three more Ranfurly Shield defences (against Northland, Manawatu and Wellington), and won the Mitre 10 Cup Championship, thus securing a well-deserved promotion to the Premiership division. The Magpies held on to the Shield during the entire 2021 Bunnings NPC season, winning all six Ranfurly Shield defences.

After a one-year absence, during which he played for French Top 14 club Bayonne, Cridge returned to Hawke's Bay to play for the Magpies in the 2023 Bunnings NPC.

== Super Rugby ==
Cridge spent time with the Wellington-based Hurricanes as part of their apprenticeship program in 2014 and made such a good impression that after only 1 domestic appearance for Hawke's Bay, new franchise head-coach Chris Boyd handed him a 3-year contract ahead of the 2015 Super Rugby season. Unsurprisingly, given his lack of experience and the amount of talent on the Hurricanes books, he didn't make any senior appearances through 2015.

He did manage to get on the field for his Super Rugby debut in 2016, as a substitute in a 42–20 win over South African side Southern Kings on 25 March 2016. It would prove to be his only appearance of the campaign, but his team were in great form during the year and with Michael Fatialofa and Vaea Fifita nailing down the two second row jerseys, it was hard for the youngster to break into a side that went on to be crowned Super Rugby champions following a 20–3 victory over the Lions in the final.

Despite several strong seasons for Hawke's Bay in the following years, Cridge had to wait until 2022 for a new Super Rugby contract. While not announced in their original squad, he was announced as a reinforcement of the Waratahs squad for the 2022 Super Rugby Pacific season on 21 January 2022. He made his debut for the Waratahs on 18 February 2022 in their round 1 game against Fijian Drua.

== Move to France ==
On 22 June 2022, it was announced that Cridge had signed with 2021–22 Pro D2 champions Bayonne for two seasons. He made his Top 14 debut for the French club on 1 October 2022 against Brive and played his first EPCR Challenge Cup game for the side on 11 December 2022 against Scarlets.

Cridge went on to play only 9 games for the club. At the end of the season, he was released one year early from his contract and he returned to Hawke's Bay.

== Japan ==
On 2 February 2025, Japanese club Green Rockets Tokatsu announced that Cridge had joined the club. He made his debut for the club that same day. He left the club at the end of the season.

== International career ==
Cridge was a member of the New Zealand Under-20 sides that competed in the 2014 IRB Junior World Championship in his home country and the 2015 World Rugby Under 20 Championship in Italy. He played four times as New Zealand finished 3rd in 2014 and then scored a try in his only appearance in the title-winning side of 2015.

== Career Honours ==
New Zealand Under-20

- World Rugby Under 20 Championship - 2015

Hurricanes

- Super Rugby - 2016

Hawke's Bay Magpies

- ITM Cup Championship - 2015
- Mitre 10 Cup Championship - 2020

== Super Rugby Statistics ==
As of 23 May 2022

| Season | Team | Games | Starts | Sub | Mins | Tries | Cons | Pens | Drops | Points | Yel | Red |
|---|---|---|---|---|---|---|---|---|---|---|---|---|
| 2015 | Hurricanes | 0 | 0 | 0 | 0 | 0 | 0 | 0 | 0 | 0 | 0 | 0 |
| 2016 | Hurricanes | 1 | 0 | 1 | 7 | 0 | 0 | 0 | 0 | 0 | 0 | 0 |
| 2022 | Waratahs | 11 | 7 | 4 | 455 | 0 | 0 | 0 | 0 | 0 | 0 | 0 |
| Total | | 12 | 7 | 5 | 462 | 0 | 0 | 0 | 0 | 0 | 0 | 0 |
