= Hayden Michaels =

New Zealand rugby union player

- Born: 3 January 2002 (age 24) New Zealand
- Height: 186 cm (6 ft 1 in)
- Weight: 103 kg (227 lb; 16 st 3 lb)
- School: Gore High School

Rugby union career
- Position: Flanker
- Current team: Highlanders, Southland
Senior career
Years	Team	Apps	(Points)
2021–	Southland	16	(0)
2024–	Highlanders		
- Correct as of 19 November 2023

Hayden Michaels (born 3 January 2002) is a New Zealand rugby union player, who plays for the Highlanders and Southland. His preferred position is flanker.

== Early career ==
Michaels attended Gore High School where his performances from the rugby team earned him selection for the Highlanders Under-20s team. He represented New Zealand U20 in 2022.

== Professional career ==
Michaels has represented Southland in the National Provincial Championship since 2021, being named in their full squad for the 2023 Bunnings NPC. He was named in the Highlanders squad for the 2024 Super Rugby Pacific season.
