= Josh Whaanga =

New Zealand rugby union player (born 2004)

- Born: 15 March 2004 (age 22) Balclutha, New Zealand
- Height: 193 cm (6 ft 4 in)
- Weight: 98 kg (216 lb; 15 st 6 lb)
- School: John McGlashan College
- Notable relative: Matt Whaanga (brother)

Rugby union career
- Position: Centre / Wing
- Current team: Highlanders, Otago
Senior career
Years	Team	Apps	(Points)
2023–	Otago	19	(25)
2025–	Highlanders		
- Correct as of 10 December 2024
International career
Years	Team	Apps	(Points)
2024	New Zealand U20	2	(0)
- Correct as of 10 December 2024

Josh Whaanga (born 15 March 2004) is a New Zealand rugby union player, who plays for the Highlanders and Otago. His preferred position is centre or wing.

== Early career ==
Whaanga is from Balclutha and attended John McGlashan College. He represented New Zealand U20 in 2024. He is the brother of fellow rugby union player Matt Whaanga.

== Professional career ==
Whaanga has represented Otago in the National Provincial Championship since 2023, being named in their full squad for the 2024 Bunnings NPC. He was named in the Highlanders squad for the 2025 Super Rugby Pacific season in November 2024.
