= PJ Sheck =

New Zealand rugby union player

- Born: 10 March 2000 (age 26) New Zealand
- Height: 190 cm (6 ft 3 in)
- Weight: 116 kg (256 lb; 18 st 4 lb)
- School: Porirua College

Rugby union career
- Position: Prop
- Current team: Blues, Wellington
Senior career
Years	Team	Apps	(Points)
2021–	Wellington	15	(0)
2023–	Highlanders	1	(0)
- Correct as of 16 August 2023

PJ Sheck (born 10 March 2000) is a New Zealand rugby union player, who plays for the Highlanders and Wellington. His preferred position is prop.

== Early career ==
Sheck plays his club rugby for Tawa RFC.

== Professional career ==
Sheck was called into the Highlanders squad ahead of Round 4 of the 2023 Super Rugby Pacific season, making his debut as a replacement against the Force. Sheck has played for Wellington since 2021, and was named in the squad for the 2023 Bunnings NPC.
