= Malachi Wrampling =

New Zealand rugby union player

- Full name: Malachi Wrampling-Alec
- Born: 15 April 2004 (age 22) New Zealand
- Height: 192 cm (6 ft 4 in)
- Weight: 112 kg (247 lb; 17 st 9 lb)

Rugby union career
- Position: Flanker / Number 8
- Current team: Chiefs, Waikato
Senior career
Years	Team	Apps	(Points)
2023–	Waikato	9	(15)
2024–	Chiefs		
- Correct as of 19 November 2023
International career
Years	Team	Apps	(Points)
2023	New Zealand U20	5	(10)
- Correct as of 19 November 2023

Malachi Wrampling (born 15 April 2004) is a New Zealand rugby union player, who plays for the Chiefs and Waikato. His preferred position is flanker or number 8.

== Early career ==
Wrampling-Alec attended St Paul's Collegiate School where he played rugby and was selected for New Zealand Schools. He previously played club rugby for Te Awamutu Sports. He was selected for the New Zealand U20s in 2023.

== Professional career ==
Wrampling-Alec has represented Waikato in the National Provincial Championship since 2021, being named as a replacement player in the squad for the 2023 Bunnings NPC. He was named in the Chiefs squad for the 2024 Super Rugby Pacific season.

== Honours ==
New Zealand U20

- World Rugby Under 20 Championship
  - (bronze) Champion (1): 2024
