= Henry Bell (rugby union) =

New Zealand rugby union player

- Born: 22 August 1999 (age 27) New Zealand
- Height: 182 cm (6 ft 0 in)
- Weight: 108 kg (238 lb; 17 st 0 lb)

Rugby union career
- Position: Hooker
- Current team: Highlanders, Otago
Senior career
Years	Team	Apps	(Points)
2020–	Otago	46	(35)
2023	Utah Warriors	9	(10)
2024–	Highlanders	19	(0)
- Correct as of 8 January 2026

Henry Bell (born 22 August 1999) is a New Zealand rugby union player, who plays for the Highlanders and Otago. His preferred position is hooker.

== Early career ==
Bell attended John McGlashan College where he was head boy and for their first XV. He is the older brother of Crusaders hooker George Bell.

== Professional career ==
Bell has represented Otago in the National Provincial Championship since 2020, being named in their full squad for the 2023 Bunnings NPC. He joined Utah Warriors for the 2023 Major League Rugby season, making 9 appearances before returning to New Zealand. He was named in the Highlanders squad for the 2024 Super Rugby Pacific season.
