= Finn Hurley =

New Zealand rugby union player

- Born: 25 June 2003 (age 23) New Zealand
- Height: 175 cm (5 ft 9 in)
- Weight: 75 kg (165 lb; 11 st 11 lb)
- School: Otago Boys' High School Gore High School

Rugby union career
- Position: Wing / Fullback
- Current team: Highlanders, Otago
Senior career
| Years | Team | Apps | (Points) |
| 2023– | Highlanders | 9 | (10) |
| 2023– | Otago | 22 | (57) |
- Correct as of 18 April 2026

Finn Hurley (born 25 June 2003) is a New Zealand rugby union player, who plays for the Highlanders and Otago. His preferred position is wing or fullback.

== Early career ==
Hurley attended Otago Boys' High School and played for New Zealand at youth level.

== Professional career ==
Hurley was called into the Highlanders squad as a late replacement in Round 4 of the 2023 Super Rugby Pacific season, debuting against the Force. He signed for the Highlanders full-time from 2024. Hurley was named in the Otago squad for the 2023 Bunnings NPC.
