= Josh Taula =

New Zealand rugby union player

- Born: 2002 (age 23–24) New Zealand
- Height: 203 cm (6 ft 8 in)
- Weight: 114 kg (251 lb; 17 st 13 lb)
- School: Christchurch Boys' High School

Rugby union career
- Position: Lock
- Current team: Hurricanes, Manawatu
Senior career
Years	Team	Apps	(Points)
2022–	Manawatu	3	(5)
2024–2025	Hurricanes		
- Correct as of 19 November 2023

Josh Taula (born 2002) is a New Zealand rugby union player, who plays for the Hurricanes and Manawatu. His preferred position is lock.

== Early career ==
Taula attended Christchurch Boys' High School where he represented their first XV, before being recruited to the Manawatu academy. He plays his club rugby for Massey University.

== Professional career ==
Taula has represented Manawatu in the National Provincial Championship since 2022, being named in their full squad for the 2023 Bunnings NPC. He was named in the Hurricanes squad for the 2024 Super Rugby Pacific season.
