= Kauvaka Kaivelata =

New Zealand rugby union player

- Born: 11 July 2002 (age 24) New Zealand
- Height: 188 cm (6 ft 2 in)
- Weight: 113 kg (249 lb; 17 st 11 lb)

Rugby union career
- Position: Prop
- Current team: Kobelco Steelers
Senior career
Years	Team	Apps	(Points)
2022–2024	Counties Manukau	26	(20)
2024	Chiefs	1	
2024-	Kobelco Steelers	14	(0)
- Correct as of 25 June 2025

Kauvaka Kaivelata (born 11 July 2002) is a New Zealand rugby union player, who plays for the Chiefs and Counties Manukau. His preferred position is prop.

== Early career ==
Kaivelata attended Wesley College, Auckland where he played rugby. He plays his club rugby for Pukekohe. Kauvaka Kaivelata also played Manukau Rovers

== Professional career ==
Kaivelata has represented Counties Manukau in the National Provincial Championship since 2022, being named in their full squad for the 2023 Bunnings NPC. He was named in the Chiefs squad for the 2024 Super Rugby Pacific season.
