= Tahlor Cahill =

New Zealand rugby union player (born 2003)

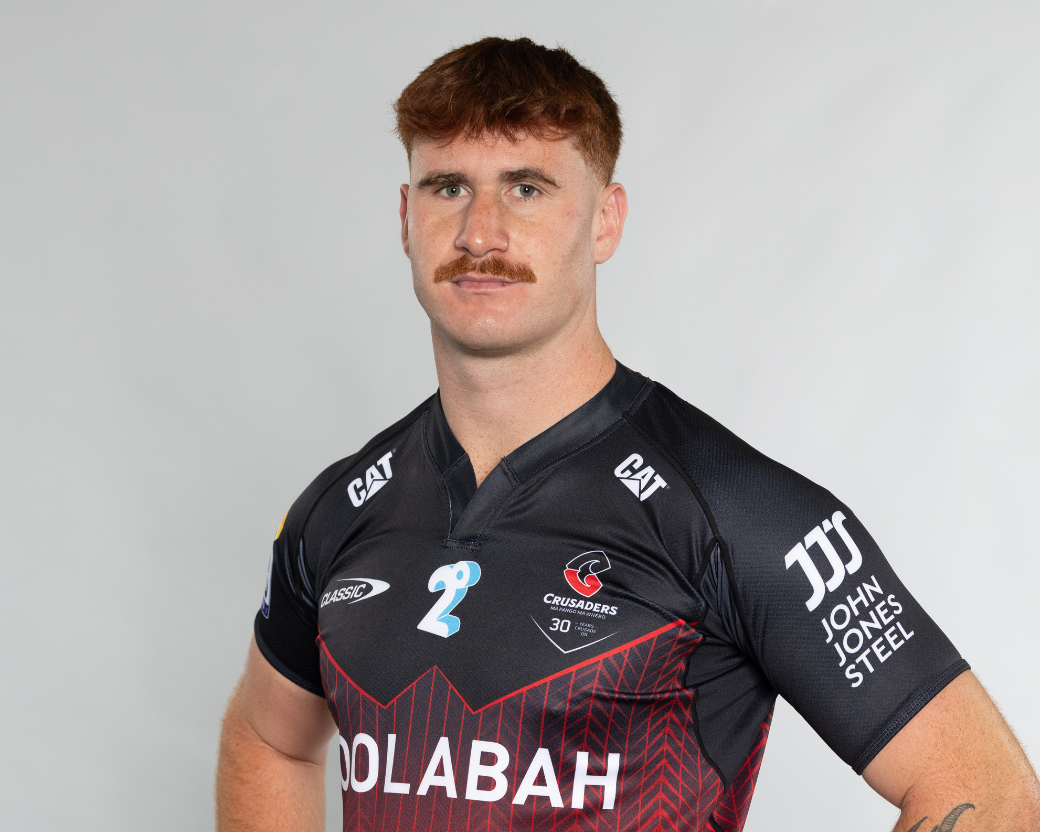
- Born: 8 June 2003 (age 23) Christchurch, New Zealand
- Height: 200 cm (6 ft 7 in)
- Weight: 118 kg (260 lb; 18 st 8 lb)
- School: Shirley Boys High School, Hamilton Boys High School

Rugby union career
- Position: Lock Blindside
- Current team: Crusaders, Canterbury
Senior career
Years	Team	Apps	(Points)
2023-	Canterbury	36	(5)
2024–	Crusaders	37	(0)
- Correct as of 29 June 2026
International career
Years	Team	Apps	(Points)
2022-2023	New Zealand U20	8	(0)
2026-	Maori All Blacks	1	(0)
- Correct as of 29 June 2026

Tahlor Cahill (born 8 June 2003) is a New Zealand rugby union player who plays for the Crusaders in Super Rugby and Canterbury in the Bunnings NPC. His preferred position is lock.

== Early career ==
Cahill attended Shirley Boys High School where he played in their First XV and senior volleyball teams. Cahill moved to Hamilton Boys' High School for his final year of school where he played rugby for their First XV and captained the senior volleyball team. Cahill earned selection to NZ Secondary Schools XV in 2021. Cahill plays his club rugby for Marist Albion. He missed out on selection for the Crusaders U20 squad 2022, however was selected for the New Zealand Barbarians side for the competition, winning the player of the tournament. Cahill captained an NZ U19s XV in 2022 for a tour in South Africa. He was selected for the New Zealand U20s in both 2022 & 2023.

== Professional career ==
Cahill has represented Canterbury in the (NPC) National Provincial Championship since 2023, being named in their full squad for the 2023 Bunnings NPC season. Tahlor has since made 36 appearances for Canterbury and has scored one try, being in a 43–11 win against Northland during the 2023 season. Tahlor has won one Bunnings NPC title with Canterbury winning the 2025 season.

Tahlor was named for the first time in the Crusaders squad for the 2024 Super Rugby Pacific season. He has gone on to appear in 37 games for the Crusaders since 2024 and won one Super Rugby Pacific Title in 2025

In June 2026 Tahlor was selected in the Maori All Blacks 2026 squad. Starting at lock and playing all 80 minutes, Tahlor made his debut 27 June 2026 in a 38–31 win against Japan XV in Nagoya
