= Meihana Grindlay =

New Zealand rugby union player

- Born: 7 April 2001 (age 25) New Zealand
- Height: 188 cm (6 ft 2 in)
- Weight: 107 kg (236 lb; 16 st 12 lb)

Rugby union career
- Position: Centre
- Current team: Blues, Taranaki
Senior career
Years	Team	Apps	(Points)
2021–	Taranaki	19	(10)
2024–	Blues		
- Correct as of 19 November 2023

Meihana Grindlay (born 7 April 2001) is a New Zealand rugby union player, who plays for the Blues and Taranaki. His preferred position is centre.

== Early career ==
Grindlay attended King's College, Auckland on a scholarship, where he played rugby, earning selection for New Zealand Schools. After school, he moved to Taranaki and represented Southern. He was selected for the New Zealand U20s in 2021.

== Professional career ==
Grindlay has represented Taranaki in the National Provincial Championship since 2021, being named in their full squad for the 2023 Bunnings NPC. He was named in the Blues squad for the 2024 Super Rugby Pacific season.
