= Josh Jacomb =

New Zealand rugby player (born 2001)

- Born: 23 June 2001 (age 25) New Zealand
- Height: 179 cm (5 ft 10 in)
- Weight: 90 kg (198 lb; 14 st 2 lb)
- School: Sacred Heart College, Auckland

Rugby union career
- Position: First five-eighth / Fullback
- Current team: Chiefs, Taranaki
Senior career
Years	Team	Apps	(Points)
2021–	Taranaki	24	(182)
2024–2026	Chiefs	25	(34)
2027-	Highlanders		
- Correct as of 21 February 2025

Josh Jacomb (born 23 June 2001) is a New Zealand rugby union player, who plays for the Chiefs and Taranaki. His preferred position is first five-eighth or fullback.

== Early career ==
Jacomb is from Auckland, and grew up on the city's North Shore. He attended Sacred Heart College.

== Professional career ==
Jacomb first represented Taranaki in the National Provincial Championship in 2021 and was named in their full squad for the 2023 Bunnings NPC. He originally wasn't named in the Chiefs squad for the 2024 Super Rugby Pacific season, being named in the Chiefs development squad, but was announced in the side for Round 3 of the season against the Reds, making his debut in the same fixture.

Jacomb represented the All Blacks XV in 2024 against Georgia and on their 2025 tour to Europe. In June 2025 he played for the Barbarians in their 7-54 loss to South Africa

Jacomb's play for Taranaki during the 2025 National Provincial Championship was recognised at the New Zealand Rugby Awards when he received the Duane Monkley Medal. During the 2025 season he was the second highest points scorer in the NPC, behind Otago’s Cam Millar. This included scoring 30 points, including a hat-trick of tries, against Auckland. This was the highest points total registered by a Taranaki player in a NPC top division match, beating the previous mark of 29 by Beauden Barrett.

With Damian McKenzie on the Chiefs roster Jacomb's opportunity for game time was limited. In October 2025 the Highlanders confirmed the signing of Jacomb for the 2027 and 2028 Super Rugby Pacific seasons. However, Jacomb’s agent, Ben Boyle from Orbit Sports Management was unable to obtain an early release from is contract to join the Highlanders for 2026 and remained with the Chiefs for that season.
