= Will Stodart =

New Zealand rugby union player (born 2003)

- Born: 3 October 2003 (age 23) New Zealand
- Height: 195 cm (6 ft 5 in)
- Weight: 115 kg (254 lb; 18 st 2 lb)

Rugby union career
- Position: Lock / Flanker
- Current team: Highlanders, Otago
Senior career
Years	Team	Apps	(Points)
2023–	Otago	3	(5)
2024–	Highlanders		
- Correct as of 11 December 2023
International career
Years	Team	Apps	(Points)
2023	New Zealand U20	5	(10)
- Correct as of 11 December 2023

Will Stodart (born 3 October 2003) is a New Zealand rugby union player, who plays for the Highlanders and Otago. His preferred position is lock or flanker.

== Early career ==
Stodart attended St Andrew's College, Christchurch where he captained the First XV rugby team. He moved to Otago after school, joining the Highlanders academy who he represented at U20 level, and was named in the New Zealand U20 in 2023. He has cited Liam Squire as his favourite player.

== Professional career ==
Stodart has represented Otago in the National Provincial Championship since 2023, being named in their full squad for the 2023 Bunnings NPC. He originally wasn't named in the Highlanders squad for the 2024 Super Rugby Pacific season, however was named as a replacement player in December 2023.
