= Brady Rush =

New Zealand rugby player

- Born: 24 April 1999 (age 27) Auckland, New Zealand
- Height: 1.88 m (6 ft 2 in)
- Weight: 98 kg (216 lb)
- School: Kerikeri High School
- Notable relative(s): Eric Rush (father); Rob Rush (brother)

Rugby union career
- Position: Wing
- Current team: Northland
Senior career
Years	Team	Apps	(Points)
2020–	Northland	18	(5)
2026	Kolkata Banga Tigers		
- Correct as of 4 October 2024
International career
Years	Team	Apps	(Points)
2022–	New Zealand 7s	122	(154)
- Correct as of 4 October 2024

Brady Rush (born 24 April 1999) is a New Zealand rugby union player who plays as a wing for National Provincial Championship side Northland and the New Zealand national sevens team.

== International career ==
Rush was named as a contracted player for the All Blacks Sevens squad in 2021. He was named in the team for the 2022 Singapore Sevens and was to make his debut at the tournament. He was named as a non travelling reserve for the All Blacks Sevens squad for the 2022 Commonwealth Games in Birmingham.

He competed for New Zealand at the 2024 Summer Olympics in Paris.

== Personal life ==
Rush is the son of New Zealand sevens player Eric Rush.
