= Jordi Viljoen =

New Zealand rugby union player (born 2003)

- Born: 14 October 2003 (age 23) Pretoria, South Africa
- Height: 169 cm (5 ft 7 in)
- Weight: 76 kg (168 lb; 12 st 0 lb)
- School: Palmerston North Boys' High School Hastings Boys' High School
- Notable relative(s): Joggie Viljoen Snr. (grandfather); Joggie Viljoen Jnr. (father)

Rugby union career
- Position: Halfback
- Current team: Hurricanes, Manawatu
Senior career
Years	Team	Apps	(Points)
2023–	Manawatu	19	(5)
2024–	Hurricanes	5	(5)
- Correct as of 3 March 2024
International career
Years	Team	Apps	(Points)
2023	New Zealand U20	4	(0)
- Correct as of 3 March 2024

Jordi Viljoen (born 14 October 2003) is a New Zealand rugby union player, who plays for the Hurricanes and Manawatu. His preferred position is halfback.

He competed for New Zealand U20 Touch Blacks in the 2022 Youth Trans Tasman in Christchurch.

== Early career ==
Viljoen was born in Pretoria, South Africa, but relocated to New Zealand as a child. He is the son of former Stormers player Joggie Viljoen Jnr. and grandson of former Springbok Joggie Viljoen Snr.. Viljoen attended Palmerston North Boys' High School and Hastings Boys' High School, where he was selected for New Zealand Schools. He represented New Zealand U20 in 2023.

== Professional career ==
Viljoen has represented Manawatu in the National Provincial Championship since 2023, being named in their full squad for the 2023 Bunnings NPC. He was called into the Hurricanes squad ahead of Round 1 of the 2024 Super Rugby Pacific season, making his debut against the Force.
