= Tepaea Cook-Savage =

New Zealand rugby union player

- Born: 8 February 2001 (age 25) Kaitaia, New Zealand
- Height: 1.73 m (5 ft 8 in)
- Weight: 86 kg (190 lb)
- School: St. Paul's Collegiate School

Rugby union career
- Position(s): Wing, Fullback
- Current team: Chiefs
Senior career
Years	Team	Apps	(Points)
2021–	Waikato	43	(120)
2026–	Chiefs	4	(5)
- Correct as of 26 April 2026
International career
Years	Team	Apps	(Points)
2024–	New Zealand 7s	0	(0)
- Correct as of 26 April 2026

Tepaea Cook-Savage (born 8 February 2001) is a New Zealand professional rugby union player who plays as a fullback for Super Rugby club Chiefs and previously played for National Provincial Championship club Waikato and the New Zealand sevens.

== Early life ==
He attended St Paul's Collegiate School in Hamilton, New Zealand and captained their first XV rugby team in 2019. That year, he also played for the New Zealand Barbarian Schools side.

== Career ==
Te Paea Cook-Savage played for Waikato and has featured at full back. In 2021 he was Waikato's top points scorer and was subsequently called up to New Zealand Under 20's side.

He was called up to the New Zealand national rugby sevens team for the first time in December 2022. The following month he signed a two-year contract with the New Zealand Sevens side. He was a member of the New Zealand Sevens team that won the Hong Kong Sevens title in April 2024.

He competed for New Zealand at the 2024 Summer Olympics.

Ahead of the 2026 season, he left the New Zealand Rugby Sevens programme and signed for Super Rugby side Chiefs.
