= Ajay Faleafaga =

New Zealand rugby union player

- Born: 2 February 2003 (age 23) New Zealand
- Height: 175 cm (5 ft 9 in)
- Weight: 89 kg (196 lb; 14 st 0 lb)

Rugby union career
- Position: Fly-half
- Current team: Toyota Industries Shuttles
Senior career
Years	Team	Apps	(Points)
2023–2024	Otago	7	(5)
2024–2025	Highlanders	12	(12)
2025–	Toyota Industries Shuttles	1	(2)
- Correct as of 19 November 2023
International career
Years	Team	Apps	(Points)
2023	New Zealand U20	4	(0)
- Correct as of 19 November 2023

Ajay Faleafaga (born 2 February 2003) is a New Zealand rugby union player, who plays for the Highlanders and Otago. His preferred position is fly-half.

== Early career ==
Faleafaga attended St Peter's College, Auckland, where he debuted for their First XV as a 15-year old. He moved to Otago in 2021, attending Otago University. He was selected for the New Zealand U20s in 2023.

== Professional career ==
Faleafaga has represented Otago in the National Provincial Championship since 2023, being named in their full squad for the 2023 Bunnings NPC. He was named in the Highlanders squad for the 2024 Super Rugby Pacific season.
