= Jay Renton =

New Zealand rugby union player

- Born: 16 March 1998 (age 28) Invercargill, New Zealand
- Height: 1.75 m (5 ft 9 in)
- Weight: 84 kg (185 lb; 13 st 3 lb)
- School: Southland Boys' High School

Rugby union career
- Position: Halfback
Senior career
Years	Team	Apps	(Points)
2017–2024	Southland	44	(20)
2025–	Houston SaberCats	19	(10)
2025	Tasman	8	(0)
- Correct as of 11 October 2025
International career
Years	Team	Apps	(Points)
2018	New Zealand U20	6	(10)
- Correct as of 11 October 2025

Jay L. Renton (born 16 March 1998) is a New Zealand rugby union player. His position is halfback. Renton played 44 games for Southland between 2017 and 2024 before making his debut for Tasman in Round 4 of the 2025 Bunnings NPC against North Harbour. Renton has also played in Major League Rugby.
