= Josh Beehre =

New Zealand rugby union player

- Born: 30 March 2002 (age 24) Whangārei, New Zealand
- Height: 198 cm (6 ft 6 in)
- Weight: 120 kg (265 lb; 18 st 13 lb)

Rugby union career
- Position: Lock
- Current team: Blues, Auckland
Senior career
Years	Team	Apps	(Points)
2022–	Auckland	35	(20)
2024–	Blues	40	(15)
- Correct as of 19 November 2023

Josh Beehre (born 30 March 2002) is a New Zealand rugby union player, who plays for the Blues and Auckland. His preferred position is lock.

== Early career ==
Beehre attended Whangārei Boys' High School, where he played rugby for their first XV. He plays his club rugby for Grammar TEC in Auckland, winning the Fred Allen Supreme Award in 2022. He was selected for the New Zealand U20s team in 2022.

== Professional career ==
Beehre has represented Auckland in the National Provincial Championship since 2022, being named in their full squad for the 2023 Bunnings NPC. He was named in the Blues squad for the 2024 Super Rugby Pacific season.
