= Hugo Plummer =

New Zealand rugby union player

- Born: New Zealand
- Height: 198 cm (6 ft 6 in)
- Weight: 118 kg (260 lb; 18 st 8 lb)
- School: Onslow College
- University: Victoria University of Wellington

Rugby union career
- Position: Lock
- Current team: Hurricanes, Wellington
Senior career
Years	Team	Apps	(Points)
2022–	Wellington	5	(0)
2023–	Hurricanes	1	(0)
- Correct as of 14 August 2023

Hugo Plummer is a New Zealand rugby union player, who plays for the Hurricanes and Wellington. His preferred position is lock.

== Early career ==
Plummer attended Onslow College and plays his club rugby for Tawa RFC. He came through the Wellington academy and represented Hurricanes U20.

== Professional career ==
Plummer was called into the Hurricanes squad ahead of Round 6 of the 2023 Super Rugby Pacific season, where he was a late replacement in the match against the Force. He was named in the Wellington side for the 2023 Bunnings NPC.
