= Jared Proffit =

New Zealand rugby union player

- Born: 14 September 1993 (age 33) Gisborne, New Zealand
- Height: 185 cm (6 ft 1 in)
- Weight: 113 kg (249 lb; 17 st 11 lb)
- School: Gisborne Boys' High School

Rugby union career
- Position: Prop
- Current team: Taranaki, Chiefs
Senior career
Years	Team	Apps	(Points)
2012	Poverty Bay	1	(0)
2015–	Taranaki	90	(20)
2022	Hurricanes	1	(0)
2023–	Chiefs	22	(0)
- Correct as of 20 December 2025
International career
Years	Team	Apps	(Points)
2025	Māori All Blacks	2	(0)
- Correct as of 20 December 2025

Jared Proffit (born 14 September 1993 in New Zealand) is a New Zealand rugby union player who plays for Taranaki in the National Provincial Championship. His playing position is prop.
