= Riley Hohepa =

New Zealand rugby union player

- Full name: Riley H.T.M. Hohepa
- Born: 9 February 1995 (age 31) Pukekohe, New Zealand
- Height: 189 cm (6 ft 2 in)
- Weight: 96 kg (212 lb; 15 st 2 lb)
- School: Pukekohe High School

Rugby union career
- Position(s): First five-eighth, Centre
- Current team: Counties Manukau, Toshiba Brave Lupus
Senior career
Years	Team	Apps	(Points)
2019–	Counties Manukau	39	(204)
2023, 2025	Hurricanes	2	(0)
2024	Crusaders	6	(28)
2025–2026	NEC Green Rockets	8	(14)
2026–	Toshiba Brave Lupus		
- Correct as of 14 November 2024

Riley Hohepa (born 9 February 1995) is a New Zealand rugby union player, who currently plays as a first five-eighth for Bay of Plenty in New Zealand's domestic National Provincial Championship competition and the Hurricanes in Super Rugby.

== Early career ==
Hohepa received his secondary school education at Pukekohe High School. He plays his club rugby for Patumahoe RFC.

== Senior career ==
Hohepa earned his first professional contract in 2019, when he was named in the Counties Manukau squad for the first time. He made his debut for the province on 10 August 2019 against Taranaki.

Hohepa was called into the Hurricanes squad ahead of Round 5 of the 2023 Super Rugby Pacific season. He made his Super Rugby debut in the match against Moana Pasifika on 25 March 2023.

Ahead of the 2024 Super Rugby Pacific season, Hohepa spent time training with the Chiefs wider squad during preseason, but eventually played for the Crusaders, having been called into the squad as an injury replacement. He made his debut for the franchise on 9 March 2024 against the Fijian Drua in Lautoka.

On 12 November 2024, Hohepa was named in the Hurricanes squad for the 2025 Super Rugby Pacific season.

Hohepa signed for the Bay of Plenty Steamers for the 2026 NPC season.
