= Taine Robinson =

New Zealand Rugby player

- Born: 15 June 1999 (age 27) Collingwood, New Zealand
- School: Nelson College

Rugby union career
- Position(s): First five-eighth, Centre, Fullback
- Current team: Tasman, Highlanders
Senior career
Years	Team	Apps	(Points)
2021–	Tasman	22	(99)
2024	Crusaders	2	(0)
2025–	Highlanders	15	(29)
- Correct as of 22 August 2026

Taine Robinson (born 15 June 1999) is a New Zealand rugby union player who plays for Tasman in the Bunnings NPC and the Highlanders in Super Rugby. He can play in the first five-eighth, centre and fullback positions.

== Career ==
Born in the town of Collingwood, Robinson was educated at Nelson College and plays his club rugby for Stoke. He was named in the Tasman Mako squad for the 2021 Bunnings NPC. Robinson made his debut for Tasman in Round 3 of the competition against Northland, coming off the bench in a 29–48 win for the Mako. The side went on to make the final before losing 23–20 to Waikato.
