= Lucas Cashmore =

New Zealand rugby union player

- Full name: Lucas H. Cashmore
- Born: 25 August 2002 (age 24) New Zealand
- Height: 177 cm (5 ft 10 in)
- Weight: 85 kg (187 lb; 13 st 5 lb)
- School: Tauranga Boys' College
- Notable relative: Adrian Cashmore (uncle)

Rugby union career
- Position(s): First five-eighth, Fullback
- Current team: Bay of Plenty, Shimizu Koto Blue Sharks
Senior career
Years	Team	Apps	(Points)
2021–	Bay of Plenty	39	(190)
2024	Blues	2	(0)
2025–2026	Hurricanes	6	(4)
2026–	Shimizu Koto Blue Sharks	0	(0)
- Correct as of 15 October 2026
International career
Years	Team	Apps	(Points)
2022	New Zealand U20	3	(38)
- Correct as of 15 May 2026

Lucas Cashmore (born 25 August 2002) is a New Zealand rugby union player who plays as a first five-eighth for Bay of Plenty in New Zealand's domestic National Provincial Championship competition and the Shimizu Koto Blue Sharks in the Japan Rugby League One.

== Early career ==
Cashmore attended Tauranga Boys' College, where he played rugby for their first XV team. Both in 2021 and 2022, Cashmore represented the Chiefs U20 side in the Super Rugby Aotearoa U20 tournament.

== Senior career ==
Cashmore has represented Bay of Plenty in the National Provincial Championship since 2021; he was named in their full squad for the first time for the 2022 Bunnings NPC.

On 9 November 2023, Cashmore was named in the Blues squad for the 2024 Super Rugby Pacific season.

Cashmore was named in the Hurricanes squad for the 2025 Super Rugby Pacific season on 12 November 2024.

In October 2026, Cashmore joined the Shimizu Koto Blue Sharks in Division 2 of the Japan Rugby League One (JRLO).

== International career ==
In 2022, Cashmore was named in the New Zealand Under 20 team and played in all three matches of the 2022 Oceania Rugby Under 20 Championship. New Zealand won the tournament after winning all three games.
