= Zarn Sullivan =

New Zealand rugby union player (born 2000)

- Born: 10 July 2000 (age 26) Napier, New Zealand
- Height: 193 cm (6 ft 4 in)
- Weight: 101 kg (223 lb; 15 st 13 lb)
- School: King's College; Napier Boys' High School
- Notable relative: Bailyn Sullivan (brother)

Rugby union career
- Position(s): Fullback, First five-eighth
- Current team: Hawke's Bay, Blues
Senior career
Years	Team	Apps	(Points)
2020–2024	Auckland	31	(162)
2021–	Blues	56	(100)
2025–	Hawke's Bay	12	(16)
- Correct as of 16 June 2026
International career
Years	Team	Apps	(Points)
2022	Māori All Blacks	3	(10)
- Correct as of 28 July 2025

Zarn Sullivan (born 10 July 2000) is a New Zealand rugby union player, who currently plays as a fullback or fly-half for the Blues in Super Rugby and for Hawke's Bay in New Zealand's domestic National Provincial Championship competition.

== Early career ==
Sullivan was born in Napier in Hawke's Bay, where he attended Napier Boys' High School. While at Napier Boys', he played for the school's First XV team and represented Hawke's Bay at Under 14 and Under 16 level.

In 2017, he followed in his brother Bailyn Sullivan's footsteps and moved to Auckland where he spent his final two years of secondary school at King's College. He played for the college's First XV team in the Auckland 1A 1st XV competition. In 2017, an injury prevented him from being selected in the Auckland Under 18 squad, but a year later he was invited to attend the Blues Under 18 camp.

In 2019, Sullivan represented Auckland at Under 19 level at the Jock Hobbs Memorial National Under 19 tournament. That same year – his first year out of school – he was named the Auckland Rugby "Club Rookie of the Year" at the province's end-of-year awards function.

In 2019 and 2020, he played for both the Blues Under 20 and the Blues 'A' team.

== Senior career ==
In September 2020, Sullivan was named in the Auckland squad for the 2020 Mitre 10 Cup season. He made his debut for the province – via the bench – on 20 September 2020 against Wellington and earned his first start on 17 October 2020 against Tasman.

His first, successful season playing for Auckland saw him rewarded with a spot in the Blues squad for the 2021 Super Rugby season. Having already played for the Blues during preseason ahead of the 2020 Super Rugby season, after being offered an Interim Training Contract, he made his Super Rugby debut for the franchise on 1 May 2021 against a Chiefs side that featured his brother Bailyn Sullivan. He scored a try on debut.

Sullivan went on to play 7 games for the Blues in his first season, which culminated in the franchise winning the Super Rugby Trans-Tasman title. While he played all his 1st XV rugby and age-grade representative rugby at first five-eighth, he played at fullback in all his senior games for Auckland and the Blues. He did this so well, that he was named the Blues "Rookie of the Year" at the end of the 2021 season.

In November 2021, Sullivan re-signed with the Blues until the end of the 2024 Super Rugby season.

On 23 June 2025, it was confirmed that Sullivan would be returning home to Hawke's Bay ahead of the 2025 Bunnings NPC season. Three weeks later he was named in the 2025 Hawke's Bay NPC squad. He made his debut for the Magpies on 3 August 2025 against Counties Manukau.

== International career ==
In 2018, after his last year at King's College, Sullivan was named in the New Zealand Secondary Schools team for a three-match international series in Australia. He played in all three games, including a 24–12 victory over Australian Schools.

A year later, Sullivan - who is of Ngāti Kahungunu descent - was selected to play for the first ever New Zealand Māori Under 20 team in a match against Fiji U20. The NZ Māori Under 20 team, which Sullivan co-captained, won the game 48 to 31.

Late 2019 and early 2020, Sullivan was invited to attend the New Zealand Under 20 trial and development camps in preparation of the 2020 Oceania Rugby Under 20 Championship and World Rugby U20 Championship. Unfortunately, Sullivan missed out on playing for the New Zealand Under 20 team, because these tournaments were cancelled due to the COVID-19 pandemic.

In June 2022, Sullivan and his brother Bailyn were – for the first time – named in the Māori All Blacks squad to take on Ireland on their New Zealand tour. He made his debut for the side on 29 June 2022, when the Māori All Blacks beat Ireland 32–17 in Hamilton. Sullivan, who for the first time played together with his brother, had a man-of-the-match performance and scored a try on debut.
