= Matt Whaanga =

New Zealand rugby union player

- Born: 25 May 1997 (age 29) New Zealand
- Height: 188 cm (6 ft 2 in)
- Weight: 104 kg (229 lb; 16 st 5 lb)
- School: South Otago High School

Rugby union career
- Position: Centre
- Current team: Highlanders, Southland
Senior career
Years	Team	Apps	(Points)
2018–2020	Otago	16	(5)
2021–	Southland	24	(30)
2023–2024	Highlanders	6	(5)
- Correct as of 16 August 2023

Matt Whaanga (born 25 May 1997) is a New Zealand rugby union player, who plays for the Highlanders and Southland. His preferred position is centre.

== Early career ==
Whaanga studied at South Otago High School, scoring 60 points in a match for the school in 2014.

== Professional career ==
Whaanga represented Otago from 2018 until 2020. He joined Southland in 2021, and has remained with the side since, being named in the side for the 2023 Bunnings NPC. He was called into the Highlanders as a late replacement for Round 14 of the 2023 Super Rugby Pacific season, debuting against the Reds.
