= James Tucker (rugby union) =

- Born: 5 August 1994 (age 32) Christchurch, New Zealand
- Height: 1.97 m (6 ft 6 in)
- Weight: 115 kg (18 st 2 lb; 254 lb)
- School: St Pius X College; St Bede's College
- University: University of Waikato

Rugby union career
- Position: Lock / Loose forward
- Current team: Waikato
Senior career
Years	Team	Apps	(Points)
2014−	Waikato	59	(40)
2016−2017	Chiefs	5	(0)
2017−2018	Zebre	4	(0)
2019	Toshiba Brave Lupus Tokyo	7	(0)
2021	Brumbies	6	(0)
2022-2023	Blues	23	(5)
2024	Hurricanes		
2024-2025	Yakult Levins Toda	8	(25)
- Correct as of 16 July 2016
International career
Years	Team	Apps	(Points)
2014	New Zealand U20	5	(5)
- Correct as of 5 October 2015

James Tucker (born 5 August 1994) is a New Zealand rugby union player who currently plays as a lock or loose forward for Waikato in New Zealand's domestic Mitre 10 Cup.

== Early career ==
Born in Christchurch, Tucker moved to Sydney, Australia while he was a primary school student, but moved back to the land of his birth during high school and attended St Bede's College in his home town where he played first XV rugby. He moved north to Hamilton after graduating from high school and started playing club rugby for the Hamilton Marist club in Waikato's Club Rugby competition.

== Senior career ==
Tucker was first named in the Waikato squad for the 2014 ITM Cup, however due to knee and shoulder injuries, he didn't get any game time during the season and had to wait until the following year for his provincial debut. He played 9 times for Waikato in a season in which they claimed the Ranfurly Shield and he was named as Waikato Supporters Club forward of the year. 2016 proved to be another tough year for him, with an ACL knee injury sustained in week 2 against North Harbour ruling him out for the rest of the year.

== Super Rugby ==
Having been a member of the Chiefs development squad and trained with their first team in 2015, Tucker was promoted to the franchise's wider training group for the 2016 Super Rugby season. He made 4 substitute appearances in a campaign which saw the men from Hamilton reach the competition's semi-finals before going down to New Zealand rivals and eventual champions, the Hurricanes. Despite injury ruining his 2016 domestic season, he was named as a full squad member for 2017.

== International ==
Tucker was a member of the New Zealand Under-20 side which finished in 3rd place in the 2014 IRB Junior World Championship in his home country.

== Super Rugby Statistics ==
As of 11 December 2016

Season	Team	Games	Starts	Sub	Mins	Tries	Cons	Pens	Drops	Points	Yel	Red
2016	Chiefs	4	0	4	61	0	0	0	0	0	0	0
Total		4	0	4	61	0	0	0	0	0	0	0

== Cricket ==
In addition to being a fine rugby player in high school, Tucker also played cricket, representing Canterbury at age group level and New Zealand at under-19 level.
