= Will Gualter =

New Zealand rugby union player

- Born: 5 June 2001 (age 25) Timaru, New Zealand
- Height: 190 cm (6 ft 3 in)
- Weight: 83 kg (183 lb; 13 st 1 lb)

Rugby union career
- Position(s): Wing, Fullback, Centre
Senior career
Years	Team	Apps	(Points)
2022	Canterbury	5	(5)
2023	Crusaders	5	(0)
2023	Tasman	8	(10)
- Correct as of 24 September 2023

Will Gualter is a New Zealand rugby union player. His position is wing or fullback.

== Early career ==
Gualter is from Timaru, and attended Lincoln High School, becoming the first student from the school to represent New Zealand Schools.

== Professional career ==
Gualter was named in the Canterbury squad for the 2022 Bunnings NPC ahead of Round 1. He joined the Crusaders ahead of Round 5 of the 2023 Super Rugby Pacific season, making his debut against the Brumbies.
