= TK Howden =

New Zealand rugby union player

- Full name: Te Kamaka Howden
- Born: 28 January 2001 (age 25) Feilding, New Zealand
- Height: 196 cm (6 ft 5 in)
- Weight: 109 kg (240 lb; 17 st 2 lb)
- School: Feilding High School

Rugby union career
- Position: Flanker
- Current team: Manawatu, Hurricanes
Senior career
Years	Team	Apps	(Points)
2020–	Manawatu	48	(45)
2022–2024	Hurricanes	16	(0)
2025-	Highlanders	24	(0)
- Correct as of 23 May 2026
International career
Years	Team	Apps	(Points)
2021	New Zealand U20	4	(0)
2022	Māori All Blacks	6	(0)
- Correct as of 24 August 2025

Te Kamaka Howden (born 28 January 2001) is a New Zealand rugby union player who plays for the Hurricanes in Super Rugby. His playing position is flanker. He was named in the Hurricanes squad for the 2022 Super Rugby Pacific season. He was also a member of the Manawatu 2021 Bunnings NPC squad.

== Personal life ==
Howden is a New Zealander of Māori descent (Ngāi Tūhoe descent).
