= Rameka Poihipi =

- Full name: Rameka Poihipi
- Born: 14 October 1998 (age 28) Hamilton, New Zealand
- Height: 189 cm (6 ft 2 in)
- Weight: 99 kg (218 lb; 15 st 8 lb)
- School: Hamilton Boys' High School

Rugby union career
- Position(s): Centre, First five-eighth
- Current team: Ricoh Black Rams
Senior career
Years	Team	Apps	(Points)
2018	Crusaders	1	(0)
2019–2024	Canterbury	35	(25)
2021–2025	Chiefs	27	(28)
2025–	Ricoh Black Rams	11	(10)
- Correct as of 5 June 2023
International career
Years	Team	Apps	(Points)
2020–2022	Māori All Blacks	3	(0)
- Correct as of 16 July 2022

Rameka Poihipi (born 14 October 1998, in New Zealand) is a New Zealand rugby union player, who plays for the Chiefs in Super Rugby and Canterbury in the Mitre 10 Cup. His preferred playing position is centre. Poihipi attended Hamilton Boys High School in Hamilton, where he was captain of the 1st XV. He has played for the Canterbury since 2019.

On 5 December 2020, Poihipi — who is of Ngāti Whakaue descent — made his debut for the Māori All Blacks in a one-off match against Moana Pasifika in Hamilton.
