= Rob Rush =

New Zealand rugby union player

- Full name: Robert Rush
- Born: 14 November 2000 (age 26) New Zealand
- Height: 193 cm (6 ft 4 in)
- Weight: 110 kg (243 lb; 17 st 5 lb)
- School: Saint Kentigern College
- Notable relative(s): Eric Rush (father); Brady Rush (brother)

Rugby union career
- Position: Flanker
- Current team: Northland, Blues
Senior career
Years	Team	Apps	(Points)
2020–	Northland	37	(30)
2023–	Blues	1	
- Correct as of 4 October 2024
National sevens team
Years	Team		Comps
2024–	New Zealand 7s		

Rob Rush (born 14 November 2000) is a New Zealand rugby union player who plays for the Blues in Super Rugby. His position is flanker. He was named in the Blues squad for the 2023 Super Rugby Pacific season. He is also a member of the Northland squad, having represented them since 2020.

The son of former All Black Eric Rush and brother of New Zealand Sevens representative Brady Rush, he began playing rugby at the age of five, originally beginning out as a lock, before moving to the flanker position.
