= Bailyn Sullivan =

New Zealand rugby union player

- Born: 3 September 1998 (age 28) Napier, New Zealand
- Height: 187 cm (6 ft 2 in)
- Weight: 93 kg (205 lb; 14 st 9 lb)
- School: King's College; Napier Boys' High School
- Notable relative: Zarn Sullivan (brother)

Rugby union career
- Position(s): Wing, Centre
- Current team: Hawke's Bay, Kubota Spears
Senior career
Years	Team	Apps	(Points)
2017–2025	Waikato	81	(105)
2018–2021	Chiefs	8	(5)
2022–2026	Hurricanes	50	(90)
2026	Hawke's Bay	0	(0)
2026–	Kubota Spears		
- Correct as of 18 June 2026
International career
Years	Team	Apps	(Points)
2018	New Zealand U20	5	(15)
2022–	Māori All Blacks	7	(10)
2022	All Blacks XV	2	(5)
- Correct as of 9 July 2026

Bailyn Sullivan (born 3 September 1998) is a New Zealand rugby union player, who currently plays as a midfield back or wing for Hawke's Bay in New Zealand's National Provincial Championship and for the Hurricanes in Super Rugby.

== Early career ==
Sullivan was born in Napier in Hawke's Bay, where he attended Napier Boys' High School for four years. He was first selected in the school's First XV team in 2013, as a Year 10 student, and played two years for the team.

In 2015, he moved to Auckland to attend King's College for his final two years of secondary school. He played for the school's First XV team, but unfortunately his second year in the team was cut short due to a season-ending knee injury that required surgery.

Sullivan moved to Hamilton after finishing high school, where the Chiefs – via their development team – helped him with his recovery from his knee injury. He played for Hamilton Marist in the Waikato club rugby competition.

== Senior career ==
Sullivan was – for the first time – named in the Waikato squad for the 2017 Mitre 10 Cup season. He made his NPC debut for Waikato on 19 August 2017 against Taranaki, starting at centre. He scored his first try for the province on 25 August 2017 against Counties Manukau.

In 2018, Sullivan was a member of the Chiefs Taua Development squad and made his debut for the senior side – via the bench – in the Chiefs' game against the Sunwolves on 24 March 2018 in Tokyo. Later that year, he was named in the Chiefs squad for the 2019 Super Rugby season. He scored his first Super Rugby try for the Chiefs on 29 May 2021 against the Reds.

In the three years that Sullivan was part of the Chiefs squad, he made 8 appearances for the franchise. On 6 September 2021, the Chiefs – via their social media – announced that they had released Sullivan. That same day, the Hurricanes announced that he would join the franchise for the 2022 Super Rugby Pacific season.

2021 was a successful year for Sullivan with Waikato. The province won the 2021 Bunnings NPC Premiership title after beating Tasman 23 – 20 in the Final. Sullivan scored Waikato's two only tries in that game; both were intercept tries. During the provincial union's end-of-season awards function, Sullivan was named the NPC Back of the Year.

Sullivan made his Hurricanes debut – via the bench – on 19 February 2022 against the Crusaders and scored a try on debut. He went on to make 12 appearances and score 5 tries for his new franchise during the 2022 Super Rugby Pacific season.

On 18 June 2026, the Hawke's Bay Rugby Union announced that Sullivan would join the Magpies for the 2026 NPC season, where he would link up with his brother Zarn Sullivan.

== International career ==
After his first year at King's College, in 2015, Sullivan was named in the New Zealand Barbarians Schools' squad for a game against the New Zealand Secondary Schools team. However, due to multiple injuries in the New Zealand Secondary Schools squad, he trained with and played for that team against New Zealand Barbarians Schools. He didn't travel with the New Zealand Secondary Schools team to Australia for that year's three-match international series.

The following year, he missed out on a spot in the New Zealand Secondary Schools team due to the knee injury he suffered while playing for King's College.

Sullivan was a member of the New Zealand Under-20 side that competed in the 2018 Oceania Rugby Under 20 Championship and the 2018 World Rugby Under 20 Championship.

In June 2022, Sullivan – who is of Ngāti Kahungunu descent – was named in the Māori All Blacks squad to take on Ireland during their 2022 tour of New Zealand. He made his debut for the side on 29 June 2022, when the Māori All Blacks beat Ireland 32–17 in Hamilton. In 2026, he was named to captain the side for a game against Japan XV in Tokyo.

On 10 October 2022, Sullivan was named in the All Blacks XV squad for two matches against Ireland A and the Barbarians during their Northern Tour. He made his debut for the side – via the bench – on 13 November 2022 against the Barbarians and scored a try on debut.

== Career honours ==
Hurricanes

- Super Rugby: 2026

Waikato

- Bunnings NPC Premiership: 2021
