= James Thompson (rugby union) =

New Zealand rugby union player

- Born: 13 July 1999 (age 27) Whakatane, New Zealand
- Height: 195 cm (6 ft 5 in)
- Weight: 117 kg (258 lb; 18 st 6 lb)
- School: St. Peter's School
- University: Waikato university

Rugby union career
- Position: Lock
- Current team: Leicester Tigers
Senior career
Years	Team	Apps	(Points)
2019–2022	Waikato	25	(5)
2023–2024	Counties Manukau	19	(5)
2024	Blues	3	
2025	Chiefs	1	
2025–	Leicester Tigers	22	(15)
- Correct as of 16 November 2026
International career
Years	Team	Apps	(Points)
2019	New Zealand U20s	1	(0)
- Correct as of 25 June 2025

James Thompson (born 13 July 1999) is a New Zealand rugby union player who plays for Leicester Tigers in England's Premiership Rugby. He had previously played for the Chiefs in Super Rugby. He signed for English Premiership side Leicester Tigers on 26 June 2025. His playing position is flanker. He has signed for the Chiefs wider training squad in 2020.
