= Ioane Moananu =

New Zealand rugby union player

- Born: 8 February 2001 (age 25) New Zealand
- Height: 173 cm (5 ft 8 in)
- Weight: 113 kg (249 lb; 17 st 11 lb)

Rugby union career
- Position: Hooker
- Current team: Highlanders, Counties Manukau
Senior career
Years	Team	Apps	(Points)
2021–	Counties Manukau	17	(40)
2023–2025	Crusaders	17	(35)
2026	Waratahs	8	(30)
2027–	Highlanders	0	(0)
- Correct as of 30 May 2026

Ioane Moananu (born 8 February 2001) is a New Zealand rugby union player, currently playing for the Waratahs and Counties Manukau. His preferred position is hooker.

== Early career ==
Moananu attended De La Salle in Auckland, before playing for Manurewa RFC.

== Professional career ==
Moananu was named in the Counties Manukau squad for the 2022 Bunnings NPC. He joined the Crusaders ahead of Round 3 of the 2023 Super Rugby Pacific season, making his debut against the Drua. He scored his first try for the team in the same game in the 78th minute. He also scored his second try for the side against the Rebels, earning comparisons to Keven Mealamu.

In late July 2026, Moananu was announced as the Highlanders' latest transfer, signing a two-year deal ahead of the 2027 season.
