= Saula Ma'u =

Tonga rugby union player

- Born: 29 April 2000 (age 26) Tonga
- Height: 194 cm (6 ft 4 in)
- Weight: 142 kg (313 lb; 22 st 5 lb)
- School: Auckland Grammar School

Rugby union career
- Position: Prop
- Current team: Otago, Highlanders
Senior career
Years	Team	Apps	(Points)
2019–	Otago	40	(20)
2022–	Highlanders	58	(10)
- Correct as of 19 August 2026
International career
Years	Team	Apps	(Points)
2026-	New Zealand	1	
- Correct as of August 2026

Saula Ma'u (born 29 April 2000) is a New Zealand rugby union player who plays for the Highlanders in Super Rugby. His playing position is prop. He was named in the Highlanders squad for the 2022 Super Rugby Pacific season. He was also a member of the Otago 2021 Bunnings NPC squad.

In August 2026, Ma'u became All Black No. 1242 playing against the Lions in Johannesburg, featuring in the last 20 minutes of the All Blacks' 41-35 win.
