= Corey Evans =

New Zealand rugby union player

- Born: 11 January 2001 (age 25) Waipapakauri, Far North District, New Zealand
- Height: 1.81 m (5 ft 11 in)
- Weight: 96 kg (212 lb)

Rugby union career
- Position(s): Centre, Fullback
- Current team: Northland, Blues
Senior career
Years	Team	Apps	(Points)
2021–2023	Auckland	23	(15)
2022–	Blues	27	(20)
2024–	Northland	9	(5)
- Correct as of 4 October 2024
International career
Years	Team	Apps	(Points)
2021	New Zealand U20		
2024–	Māori All Blacks	1	(0)
- Correct as of 4 October 2024

Corey Evans (born 11 January 2001) is a New Zealand rugby union player who plays for the Blues in Super Rugby and Northland in the Bunnings NPC. His position is centre. He was named in the Blues squad for the 2022 Super Rugby Pacific season. He was also a member of the Auckland 2021 Bunnings NPC squad and played for the side until 2023.

== Personal life ==
Evans is a New Zealander of Māori descent (Ngāti Kahu and Te Aupōuri descent).
