= Jake Te Hiwi =

New Zealand rugby union player

- Full name: Jakob Te Hiwi
- Born: 2 January 2002 (age 24) New Zealand
- Height: 184 cm (6 ft 0 in)
- Weight: 100 kg (220 lb; 15 st 10 lb)

Rugby union career
- Position: Centre
- Current team: Highlanders / Otago
Senior career
| Years | Team | Apps | (Points) |
| 2022– | Otago | 10 | (10) |
| 2023– | Highlanders | 2 | (0) |
- Correct as of 29 April 2024

Jake Te Hiwi is a New Zealand rugby union player, currently playing for the Highlanders and Otago. His preferred position is centre.

== Early career ==
Te Hiwi attended Otago Boys' High School where he was selected for the Otago academy. He played for Otago Boys' High School alongside his brother Isaak.

== Professional career ==
Te Hiwi was named in the Otago squad for the 2022 Bunnings NPC. He was called into the Highlanders squad for Round 3 of the 2023 Super Rugby Pacific season against the Chiefs.

Te Hiwi was named in the New Zealand U20 side in 2022.
