= Tom Florence (rugby union, born 1998) =

New Zealand rugby union player

- Born: 20 May 1998 (age 28) New Zealand
- Height: 191 cm (6 ft 3 in)
- Weight: 108 kg (238 lb; 17 st 0 lb)
- School: New Plymouth Boys High School

Rugby union career
- Position: Flanker
- Current team: Shoki Shuttles
Senior career
Years	Team	Apps	(Points)
2017–2023	Taranaki	16	(5)
2020–2022 2023–2024	Chiefs	4	(0)
2020	Highlanders	1	(0)
2022–2024	New Orleans Gold	14	(29)
2024–	Shoki Shuttles	12	(20)
- Correct as of 6 March 2023

Tom Florence (born 20 May 1998 in New Zealand) is a New Zealand rugby union player who plays for the Highlanders in Super Rugby. He also plays for the New Orleans Gold in Major League Rugby (MLR). His playing position is flanker. He was named in the squad for round 10 of the Highlanders Super Rugby Aotearoa competition.
