= 2026 Hilux NPC =

2026 rugby union competition in New Zealand

- Countries: New Zealand
- Date: 30 July – 26 October 2026
- Champions: Canterbury
- Runners-up: Northland
- Matches played: 77
- Tries scored: 715 (average 9.3 per match)
- Top point scorer: Rivez Reihana (Northland); 128 points
- Top try scorer: Kyren Taumoefolau (Tasman); 19 tries

Official website
- www.provincial.rugby

The 2026 Hilux NPC was the twenty-first season of New Zealand's provincial rugby union competition, the National Provincial Championship, since it turned professional in 2006. The 2026 NPC season also marked 50 years of provincial rugby in New Zealand since the competition's inception in 1976. The competition involved the top fourteen provincial rugby unions of New Zealand. The regular season began on 30 July 2026, when Waikato hosted Bay of Plenty. The final took place on 26 October 2026 and saw Canterbury beat Northland 43–24.

The competition saw much increased attendance, with over 300,000 fans passing through the gates during the regular season, a 57% increase on the previous season. Broadcast and streaming figures confirmed the growth in popularity of the NPC.

== Format ==
Under the current competition format, which is largely a continuation of that of 2023, the 14 provincial unions participating in the National Provincial Championship (NPC) are grouped in one single division, ranked on one single competition table and play for one NPC title.

All provincial teams play ten games during the regular season (round robin): five games are played at the provincial union's home ground and five games are away games. The seven teams that finished the previous season in 1st, 3rd, 5th, 7th, 9th, 11th and 13th place will play each other as well as four cross-over matches against the teams that finished 2nd, 4th, 6th, 8th, 10th, 12th and 14th. Likewise, the teams that finished 2nd, 4th, 6th, 8th, 10th, 12th and 14th will also play each other as well as four cross-over games against the provinces that were ranked 1st, 3rd, 5th, 7th, 9th, 11th or 13th at the end of the previous season. The ten round robin games in 2026 are played over a period of ten weeks (starting on 30 July 2026).

The regular season is followed by quarter-finals to be played by the eight highest ranked teams on the competition table. The finals rankings are determined by the number of competition points earned during the regular season. Competition points can be gained in the following way: four points are awarded to the winning team, two points to each team for a draw, and no points for a loss. Teams can also receive a bonus point if they score four or more tries in a match, or lose by seven points or less.

If two or more provincial teams finish with an equal number of competition points, the following tiebreaker rules apply. If two unions are tied, the union which has defeated the other in a head-to-head is placed higher. In case of a draw between them, the side with the biggest points difference is ranked higher. If three or more unions are tied and they have all played each other, the team with most competition points in that year against the other tied unions is ranked higher; if they have not all played each other, the team with the biggest points difference in the round robin is ranked higher. In all cases, if these unions are still tied, the ranking is decided by the highest number of tries scored, the most points scored, or a coin toss.

The quarter-finals are played as follows, with the highest ranked team hosting:

QF 1: 1 v 8;
QF 2: 2 v 7;
QF 3: 3 v 6; and
QF 4: 4 v 5.

In the semi-finals, the highest-ranked quarter-final winner hosts the lowest-ranked quarter-final winner and the second highest-ranked quarter-final winner hosts the third highest-ranked quarter-final winner.

The NPC Final will be played between the two semi-final winners, again at the home venue of the team with the higher finals ranking.

The rules governing the Ranfurly Shield state that every home game during the regular season played by the union that holds the Ranfurly Shield is a mandatory challenge match. No challenge matches will be played after the regular season has ended (i.e., during the finals). A holder who competes in the NPC must also accept at least two challenges from unions competing in the Heartland Championship, including a challenge lodged by the winner of the Meads Cup at the end of the previous season. These non-mandatory challenge matches must be played before the start of the NPC season.

== Standings ==
Pos	Team	Pld	W	D	L	PF	PA	PD	TF	TA	TB	LB	Pts	Qualification
1	Canterbury (C)	10	8	0	2	311	240	+71	50	35	8	0	40	NPC quarter-finals
2	Northland (RU)	10	7	0	3	344	208	+136	50	30	8	2	38	NPC quarter-finals
3	Otago	10	7	0	3	386	283	+103	58	39	8	1	37	NPC quarter-finals
4	North Harbour	10	6	0	4	367	269	+98	54	40	9	3	36	NPC quarter-finals
5	Taranaki	10	6	0	4	342	237	+105	52	35	7	3	34	NPC quarter-finals
6	Hawke's Bay	10	6	0	4	338	270	+68	52	42	7	2	33	NPC quarter-finals
7	Tasman	10	6	0	4	348	319	+29	53	46	7	1	32	NPC quarter-finals
8	Waikato	10	5	0	5	324	302	+22	48	44	8	2	30	NPC quarter-finals
9	Bay of Plenty	10	5	0	5	258	300	−42	38	46	7	1	28	
10	Manawatu	10	5	0	5	272	332	−60	36	51	4	1	25	
11	Auckland	10	3	0	7	289	330	−41	44	48	6	4	22	
12	Counties Manukau (RS)	10	4	0	6	252	352	−100	38	53	4	0	20	
13	Southland	10	2	0	8	240	366	−126	36	60	4	1	13	
14	Wellington	10	0	0	10	239	502	−263	36	76	6	1	7	

Source: National Provincial Championship
Rules for classification: Regular season tiebreakers
(C) Champions; (RU) Runners-up; (RS) Ranfurly Shield holders

=== Standings progression ===
Each team's cumulative points total is shown for every week of the season with the overall log position in brackets.

Team	W1	W2	W3	W4	W5	W6	W7	W8	W9	W10	QF	SF	Final
Auckland	2 (9th)	7 (6th)	8 (9th)	8 (9th)	9 (11th)	9 (12th)	14 (11th)	18 (11th)	20 (11th)	22 (11th)	DNQ	DNQ	DNQ
Bay of Plenty	1 (10th)	6 (9th)	8 (8th)	13 (8th)	17 (6th)	17 (9th)	17 (10th)	22 (9th)	23 (10th)	28 (9th)	DNQ	DNQ	DNQ
Canterbury	5 (5th)	9 (3rd)	14 (2nd)	14 (7th)	15 (8th)	20 (6th)	25 (5th)	30 (5th)	35 (2nd)	40 (1st)	Won	Won	Won
Counties Manukau	0 (12th)	0 (14th)	1 (14th)	1 (14th)	6 (13th)	11 (11th)	12 (13th)	12 (13th)	16 (12th)	20 (12th)	DNQ	DNQ	DNQ
Hawke's Bay	5 (3rd)	10 (1st)	15 (1st)	20 (1st)	25 (1st)	30 (1st)	32 (1st)	32 (3rd)	32 (4th)	33 (6th)	Lost	DNQ	DNQ
Manawatu	0 (13th)	5 (10th)	6 (11th)	6 (12th)	11 (10th)	16 (10th)	20 (7th)	20 (10th)	25 (9th)	25 (10th)	DNQ	DNQ	DNQ
North Harbour	2 (8th)	7 (4th)	12 (3rd)	17 (3rd)	19 (4th)	24 (2nd)	29 (2nd)	31 (4th)	36 (1st)	36 (4th)	Lost	DNQ	DNQ
Northland	5 (2nd)	7 (5th)	12 (4th)	17 (2nd)	21 (2nd)	22 (3rd)	27 (3rd)	32 (1st)	33 (3rd)	38 (2nd)	Won	Won	Lost
Otago	5 (1st)	6 (7th)	11 (6th)	16 (5th)	21 (3rd)	22 (4th)	27 (4th)	32 (2nd)	32 (5th)	37 (3rd)	Won	Lost	DNQ
Southland	0 (14th)	2 (13th)	7 (10th)	7 (11th)	7 (12th)	8 (13th)	13 (12th)	13 (12th)	13 (13th)	13 (13th)	DNQ	DNQ	DNQ
Taranaki	4 (7th)	6 (8th)	6 (12th)	8 (10th)	13 (9th)	18 (8th)	19 (9th)	24 (7th)	29 (7th)	34 (5th)	Won	Lost	DNQ
Tasman	5 (6th)	5 (11th)	10 (7th)	15 (6th)	15 (7th)	20 (5th)	21 (6th)	22 (8th)	27 (8th)	32 (7th)	Lost	DNQ	DNQ
Waikato	5 (4th)	10 (2nd)	12 (5th)	17 (4th)	19 (5th)	19 (7th)	19 (8th)	24 (6th)	29 (6th)	30 (8th)	Lost	DNQ	DNQ
Wellington	1 (11th)	3 (12th)	3 (13th)	3 (13th)	4 (14th)	5 (14th)	5 (14th)	6 (14th)	6 (14th)	7 (14th)	DNQ	DNQ	DNQ
Key:	Win	Draw	Loss	No game	DNQ = did not qualify								

== Regular season ==
During the regular season of the 2026 National Provincial Championship, each team played ten games over a period of ten weeks. The competition started on 30 July 2026, when Waikato hosted Bay of Plenty. The first Ranfurly Shield game of the season took place on 9 August 2026, when Canterbury beat Otago 19–15 in Dunedin.

=== Week 1 ===
30 July 2026
19:10 NZST

Waikato	38–26	Bay of Plenty
Try: Nathan Stephens 2'; Waisake Salabiau 13'; Daniel Sinkinson 22'; Taha Kemara 26'; Oli Mathis 39'; Con: Taha Kemara (5/5) 3', 14', 23', 27', 40'; Pen: Austin Anderson (1/1) 73'	Report	Try: Cole Forbes 55'; Riley Hohepa 57'; Veveni Lasaqa (2) 78', 80+2'; Con: Riley Hohepa (1/2) 56'; Jason Robertson (2/2) 78', 80+3'

FMG Stadium Waikato, Hamilton
Referee: Todd Petrie

31 July 2026
19:10 NZST

Tasman	31–29	North Harbour
Try: Leo Marfell 11'; Kyren Taumoefolau (3) 36', 40+3', 62'; Cooper Roberts 47'; Con: William Havili (3/5) 12', 40+4', 64'	Report	Try: Tom Barham (2) 4', 65'; Bryn Gordon 20'; Leo Gordon 49'; Con: Cameron Howell (2/3) 21', 50'; Coby Miln (1/1) 66'; Pen: Cameron Howell (1/1) 29'

Trafalgar Park, Nelson
Referee: Maggie Cogger-Orr

1 August 2026
14:05 NZST

Counties Manukau	5–20	Taranaki
Try: Jimmy Tupou 46'; Con: AJ Alatimu (0/1)	Report	Try: Vereniki Tikoisolomone 15'; Adam Lennox 26'; Sam Clarke 57'; Con: Sam Clarke (1/3) 58'; Pen: Sam Clarke (1/1) 66'; Cards: Marika Parker (yellow card) 34'

Navigation Homes Stadium, Pukekohe
Referee: Marcus Playle

1 August 2026
17:05 NZST

Southland	14–41	Otago
Try: Clem Halaholo 33'; Jack Taylor 56'; Con: Jimmy Taylor (2/2) 34', 57'	Report	Try: Jae Broomfield 8'; Riley Lucas 14'; Josh Timu 17'; Lucas Casey (2) 23', 48'; Christian Lio-Willie (2) 37', 52'; Con: Cam Millar (3/7) 15', 24', 54'

Rugby Park, Invercargill
Referee: Angus Mabey

1 August 2026
19:10 NZST

Canterbury	38–31	Auckland
Try: Tahlor Cahill 4'; Dominic Gardiner 12'; Corey Kellow 24'; Jone Rova 29'; Jamie Hannah 67'; Richie Mo'unga 78'; Con: Andrew Knewstubb (3/4) 5', 13', 25'; Richie Mo'unga (1/2) 79'	Report	Try: Sam Hainsworth-Fa'aofo 18'; Xavier Tito-Harris 21'; Josh Beehre 34'; Stephen Perofeta 59'; Con: Stephen Perofeta (4/4) 18', 22', 35', 60'; Pen: Stephen Perofeta (1/1) 56'

One NZ Stadium, Christchurch
Referee: Paul Williams

2 August 2026
14:05 NZST

Northland	40–14	Manawatu
Try: Nathan Salmon (2) 12', 59'; Heremaia Murray 32'; Rivez Reihana 38'; Brady Rush (2) 43', 77'; Con: Rivez Reihana (5/6) 13', 33', 39', 44', 78'	Report	Try: Rory Woods 8'; James Tofa 35'; Con: Reece MacDonald (2/2) 9', 36'

Semenoff Stadium, Whangārei
Referee: Ben O'Keeffe

2 August 2026
17:05 NZST

Wellington	33–52	Hawke's Bay
Try: Logan Henry 28'; Divad Palu 34'; Du'Plessis Kirifi 67'; Reo Matsushita 74'; Cameron Burgess 80+1'; Con: Callum Harkin (4/5) 29', 35', 68', 74'	Report	Try: Folau Fakatava 2'; Hunter Morrison 8'; Neria Fomai 15'; Will Cole 20'; Tyrone Thompson 38'; Clément Castets 44'; Jonah Lowe 70'; Kade Manuel 75'; Con: Harry Godfrey (6/8) 3', 9', 16', 45', 71', 76'; Cards: Neria Fomai (yellow card) 33'

Hnry Stadium, Wellington
Referee: Fraser Hannon

=== Week 2 ===
6 August 2026
19:10 NZST

North Harbour	59–19	Counties Manukau
Try: Bryn Gordon 2'; Jed Melvin 17'; Motikai Murray (2) 23', 46'; Leka Tuʻungafasi 30'; Tom Barham (2) 35', 79'; Rory Taylor 40+1'; George Reeves 74'; Con: Cameron Howell (5/7) 3', 18', 24', 31', 47'; Coby Miln (2/2) 75', 80'	Report	Try: Josh Gray 13'; Ioane Moananu 51'; Cam Church 62'; Con: AJ Alatimu (2/3) 52', 63'; Cards: AJ Alatimu (yellow card) 26'

North Harbour Stadium, Albany
Referee: Angus Mabey

7 August 2026
19:10 NZST

Taranaki	32–38	Waikato
Try: Vereniki Tikoisolomone 4'; Jesse Parete (2) 25', 49'; Sage Walters-Hansen 68'; Meihana Grindlay 75'; Con: Sam Clarke (2/4) 27', 68'; Rocky Olsen (0/1); Pen: Rocky Olsen (1/1) 80+1'	Report	Try: Waisake Salabiau (2) 22', 37'; Michael Naitokani (2) 29', 60'; Austin Anderson 34'; Mason Tupaea 44'; Con: Taha Kemara (4/6) 30', 35', 38', 60'; Cards: Austin Anderson (yellow card) 78'

Stadium Taranaki, New Plymouth
Referee: Stuart Curran

8 August 2026
14:05 NZST

Auckland	34–31	Wellington
Try: Issak Fines-Leleiwasa 16'; Josh Beehre 30'; Rico Simpson (2) 36', 58'; Ben Ake 65'; Pita Ahki 77'; Con: Stephen Perofeta (2/6) 31', 65'	Report	Try: Isi Saumaki 12'; Reo Matsushita 24'; Penieli Poasa 33'; Dominic Ropeti 45'; James O'Reilly 67'; Con: Callum Harkin (3/5) 25', 34', 46'; Cards: Callum Harkin (yellow card) 75'

Western Springs Stadium, Auckland
Referee: Todd Petrie

8 August 2026
17:05 NZST

Bay of Plenty	34–31	Northland
Try: Jason Robertson 6'; Nikora Broughton (2) 12', 36'; Tevita Mafileo 30'; Regan Ware 50'; Con: Jason Robertson (3/5) 13', 37', 51'; Pen: Jason Robertson (1/1) 77'; Cards: Tamiro Armstrong (yellow card) 68'	Report	Try: Grady Forbes 17'; Hudson Creighton 40+3'; Terrell Peita (2) 44', 68'; Rob Rush 57'; Con: Rivez Reihana (3/5) 40+4', 58', 69'; Cards: Hudson Creighton (yellow card) 47'

Rotorua International Stadium, Rotorua
Referee: Marcus Playle

8 August 2026
19:10 NZST

Hawke's Bay	50–19	Tasman
Try: Hunter Morrison 5'; Lukas Ripley 7'; Tyrone Thompson 16'; Bailyn Sullivan 27'; Sam Smith 36'; Kade Manuel 64'; Kianu Kereru-Symes 74'; Neria Fomai 80'; Con: Harry Godfrey (5/8) 6', 8', 28', 37', 65'	Report	Try: Eli Oudenryn 23'; Dylan Irvine 58'; Maloni Kunawave 78'; Con: William Havili (2/3) 59', 78'

McLean Park, Napier
Referee: Mike Winter

9 August 2026
14:05 NZST

Otago	15–19	Canterbury – RS
Try: Lucas Casey 55'; Ben Lopas 74'; Con: Cam Millar (1/2) 74'; Pen: Cam Millar (1/1) 26'	Report	Try: Brodie McAlister (2) 16', 66'; Jamie Hannah 40+2'; Con: Richie Mo'unga (2/3) 17', 67'; Cards: Manumaua Letiu (yellow card) 54'

Forsyth Barr Stadium, Dunedin
Referee: Ben O'Keeffe

9 August 2026
17:05 NZST

Manawatu	36–35	Southland
Try: Reece MacDonald (2) 28', 71'; Jordi Viljoen 51'; Kyle Brown 53'; Alani Fakava 76'; Brayden Iose 80+2'; Con: Reece MacDonald (3/4) 29', 51', 71'; George Worboys (0/2)	Report	Try: Jimmy Taylor (2) 16', 32'; Jay Reihana 40+2'; Hayata Taniyama 44'; Michael Manson 64'; Con: Jimmy Taylor (5/5) 17', 33', 40+3',45', 64'

Central Energy Trust Arena, Palmerston North
Referee: Ben Woolerton

=== Week 3 ===
13 August 2026
19:10 NZST

Wellington	7–47	North Harbour
Try: Callum Harkin 29'; Con: Callum Harkin (1/1) 30'; Cards: Penieli Poasa (yellow card) 52'	Report	Try: Israel Leota (2) 7', 52'; Cameron Howell 19'; George Reeves 58'; Coby Miln (2) 65', 77'; Jed Melvin 73'; Con: Cameron Howell (2/3) 20', 52'; Coby Miln (4/4) 59', 66', 74', 78'; Cards: Tony Tafa (yellow card) 79'

Hnry Stadium, Wellington
Referee: Mike Winter

14 August 2026
19:10 NZST

Northland	42–0	Taranaki
Try: Lachlan Hooper (3) 1', 15', 24'; James Mullan 58'; Rivez Reihana 65'; Grady Forbes 78'; Con: Rivez Reihana (6/6) 2', 16', 24', 58', 66', 79'	Report	Cards: Bradley Tocker (yellow card) 71'

Semenoff Stadium, Whangārei
Referee: Maggie Cogger-Orr

15 August 2026
14:05 NZST

RS – Canterbury	33–28	Bay of Plenty
Try: Dallas McLeod (2) 8', 38'; Jone Rova 12'; Ngane Punivai 44'; Toby Bell 71'; Con: Andrew Knewstubb (4/5) 9', 13', 39', 45'; Cards: Johnny McNicholl (yellow card) 25'	Report	Try: Benet Kumeroa (2) 40+6', 56'; Lucas Cashmore 50'; Reon Paul 61'; Con: Jason Robertson (4/4) 40+7', 51', 57', 62'

One NZ Stadium, Christchurch
Referee: James Doleman

15 August 2026
17:05 NZST

Auckland	31–44	Hawke's Bay
Try: Xavi Taele (2) 24', 37'; Harlyn Saunoa 30'; Stephen Perofeta (2) 47', 56’ Con: Rico Simpson (1/3) 31'; Stephen Perofeta (2/2) 48', 56’ Pen: Stephen Perofeta (0/1); Cards: Josh Beehre (red card) 4'; Randall Baker (yellow card) 40'	Report	Try: Zarn Sullivan (2) 5', 72'; Cooper Flanders (2) 17', 53'; Kianu Kereru-Symes 28'; Harry Godfrey 58’ Con: Harry Godfrey (4/6) 6', 54', 59’, 73'; Pen: Harry Godfrey (2/2) 65', 80+1'

Eden Park, Auckland
Referee: Ben O'Keeffe

15 August 2026
19:10 NZST

Manawatu	27–29	Otago
Try: George Worboys 12'; John Tapueluelu 32'; Taniela Filimone 44'; Con: George Worboys (3/3) 13', 33', 45'; Pen: George Worboys (2/2) 40', 63'; Cards: James Tofa (yellow card) 20'	Report	Try: Sam Nemec-Vial (2) 24', 79'; Henry Bell 55'; Kieran McClea 70'; Lucas Casey 76'; Con: Cam Millar (1/2) 25'; Patrick Pellegrini (1/3) 71'; Cards: Jona Nareki (yellow card) 31'

Central Energy Trust Arena, Palmerston North
Referee: Warwick Lahmert

16 August 2026
14:05 NZST

Southland	32–31	Waikato
Try: Mitchell Dunshea 36'; Paula Latu (2) 51', 65'; Aukusitino Salanoa 80+1'; Con: Jimmy Taylor (3/4) 52', 66', 80+2'; Pen: Jimmy Taylor (2/2) 32', 72'	Report	Try: Austin Anderson 14'; Waisake Salabiau 47'; Sean Ralph 61'; Jahrome Brown 68'; Oli Mathis 78'; Con: Taha Kemara (3/5) 48', 62', 69'

Rugby Park, Invercargill
Referee: Fraser Hannon

16 August 2026
17:05 NZST

Counties Manukau	35–50	Tasman
Try: Cam Church 17'; Tuna Tuitama 38'; Ioane Moananu 55'; Josh Gray 64'; Adam Morrison 67'; Con: Jackson Rainsford (1/1) 18'; Tevita Ofa (1/1) 39'; AJ Alatimu (3/3) 56', 64', 68'; Pen: Jackson Rainsford (0/1)	Report	Try: Kyren Taumoefolau (5) 19', 24', 32', 45', 50'; Richie Asiata 43'; Timi Sauira 59'; Con: William Havili (6/7) 20', 25', 44', 46', 51', 60'; Pen: William Havili (1/1) 78'

Navigation Homes Stadium, Pukekohe
Referee: Nick Hogan

=== Week 4 ===
20 August 2026
19:10 NZST

Canterbury	12–36	Northland – RS
Try: Tahlor Cahill 12'; Jone Rova 16'; Con: Andrew Knewstubb (1/2) 17'	Report	Try: James Mullan 6'; Marcel Renata 30'; Sam Nock 34'; Rob Rush (2) 44', 80'; Con: Rivez Reihana (4/4) 7', 31', 35', 45'; Rob Rush (0/1); Pen: Rivez Reihana (1/1) 56'

One NZ Stadium, Christchurch
Referee: Jackson Henshaw

21 August 2026
19:10 NZST

Hawke's Bay	59–17	Manawatu
Try: Kianu Kereru-Symes 10'; Hunter Morrison (2) 37', 44’ Nic Benn 40+3'; Darby Lancaster 59'; Joe Apikotoa 64'; Hadlee Hay-Horton 66'; Valentino Taito 72'; Anaru Paenga-Morgan 78'; Con: Harry Godfrey (7/9) 11', 45', 61', 65', 67', 73', 79'	Report	Try: Rory Woods 4'; Taniela Filimone 20'; Hunter Kennedy 76'; Con: George Worboys (1/3) 20'; Cards: TK Howden (yellow card) 57'

McLean Park, Napier
Attendance: 6,800
Referee: Todd Petrie

22 August 2026
13:05 NZST

Tasman	46–17	Southland
Try: Johnny Lee 19'; Kyren Taumoefolau (2) 34', 81+2’ Wil Thornalley 53'; Lopeti Faifua 59'; Maloni Kunawave 64'; David Havili 67'; Taine Robinson 71'; Con: Taine Robinson (1/1) 20'; William Havili (2/7) 60', 68'	Report	Try: Nic Shearer 6'; Sam Fischli 22'; Fletcher Morgan 57'; Con: Mika Muliaina (1/3) 6'

Trafalgar Park, Nelson
Referee: Ben O'Keeffe

22 August 2026
17:35 NZST

North Harbour	27–19	Auckland
Try: Israel Leota (2) 2', 38'; Kade Banks 20'; Rory Taylor 34'; Con: Cameron Howell (2/4) 3', 35'; Pen: Cameron Howell (1/1) 64'	Report	Try: Siale Pahulu 6'; Xavi Taele 32'; Harlyn Saunoa 43'; Con: Stephen Perofeta (1/1) 7'; Xavi Taele (1/2) 33'

North Harbour Stadium, Albany
Referee: James Doleman

22 August 2026
19:35 NZST

Bay of Plenty	28–24	Taranaki
Try: Tamiro Armstrong 12'; Naitoa Ah Kuoi 25'; Reon Paul 34'; Nikora Broughton 61'; Con: Jason Robertson (4/4) 13', 26', 35', 62'; Cards: Nikora Broughton (yellow card) 19'; Lucas Cashmore (yellow card) 55'	Report	Try: Seta Tamanivalu 4'; Jacob Ratumaitavuki-Kneepkens 48'; Kini Naholo 56'; Vereniki Tikoisolomone 76'; Con: Sam Clarke (2/3) 5', 49'; Jamie Viljoen (0/1)

Rotorua International Stadium, Rotorua
Referee: Angus Mabey

23 August 2026
14:05 NZST

Waikato	45–12	Counties Manukau
Try: Senita Lauaki 7'; Taha Kemara 22'; Tepaea Cook-Savage 36'; D'Angelo Leuila 56'; Oli Mathis (2) 64', 67'; Daniel Sinkinson 80'; Con: Taha Kemara (4/6) 8', 57', 65', 68'; Tepaea Cook-Savage (1/1) 80+1'; Drop: Taha Kemara (0/1); Cards: James Tucker (yellow card) 9'	Report	Try: Josh Gray 11'; Atu Moli 28'; Con: AJ Alatimu (1/2) 28'; Cards: Ian West-Stevens (yellow card) 42'; Adam Morrison (yellow card) 55'

FMG Stadium Waikato, Hamilton
Referee: Paul Williams

23 August 2026
17:05 NZST

Otago	61–22	Wellington
Try: Jona Nareki 4'; Lucas Casey 17'; Jae Broomfield 26'; Kieran McClea 32'; Sam Nemec-Vial (2) 50', 63'; Harry Irving 56'; Josh Whaanga 71'; Slade McDowall 77'; Con: Cam Millar (8/9) 18', 28', 33', 51', 57', 64', 72', 78'; Cards: Jae Broomfield (yellow card) 67'	Report	Try: Reo Matsushita 13'; Dominic Ropeti 48'; Caleb Delany 67'; Con: Cameron Burgess (2/3) 49', 68'; Pen: Cameron Burgess (1/1) 22'

Forsyth Barr Stadium, Dunedin
Referee: Marcus Playle

=== Week 5 ===
27 August 2026
19:10 NZST

Southland	21–36	Hawke's Bay
Try: Scott Gregory 46'; Jack Barrett 63'; Sean Withy 75'; Con: Mika Muliaina (3/3) 48', 65', 75'	Report	Try: Frank Lochore (2) 5', 38'; Folau Fakatava (2) 13', 29'; Will Cole 24'; Hunter Morrison 54'; Con: Will Cole (3/6) 14', 25', 30'; Cards: Frank Lochore (yellow card) 79'

Rugby Park, Invercargill
Referee: Fraser Hannon

28 August 2026
19:10 NZST

Auckland	19–22	Bay of Plenty
Try: Tevita Latu 29'; Titi Nofoagatotoa 45'; Payton Spencer 53'; Con: Alex Harford (2/3) 46', 54'	Report	Try: Nikora Broughton 5'; Cole Forbes 16'; Richard Judd 70'; Con: Lucas Cashmore (1/2) 5'; Riley Hohepa (1/1) 70'; Pen: Riley Hohepa (1/1) 75'

Eden Park, Auckland
Referee: Stuart Curran

29 August 2026
14:05 NZST

Taranaki	40–26	Canterbury
Try: Kaylum Boshier (2) 2', 42'; Sam Clarke 28'; Josefa Namosimalua 33'; Zach Landon-Lane 67'; Willem Ratu 79'; Con: Sam Clarke (5/5) 3', 29', 34', 43', 68'; Jamie Viljoen (0/1)	Report	Try: Manumaua Letiu 7'; Johnny McNicholl 56'; Louie Chapman 76'; Nick Hyde 80+2'; Con: Andrew Knewstubb (3/4) 8', 57', 80+3'; Cards: Dominic Gardiner (yellow card) 32'

Stadium Taranaki, New Plymouth
Referee: Mike Winter

29 August 2026
17:05 NZST

Otago	43–38	Waikato
Try: Jona Nareki 5'; Henry Bell (2) 19', 24'; Lucas Casey 32'; Ben Lopas 44'; Sam Nemec-Vial 64'; Con: Cam Millar (5/6) 6', 20', 25', 45', 65'; Pen: Cam Millar (1/1) 72'	Report	Try: Nathan Stephens 10'; Rui Farrant 14'; Tepaea Cook-Savage 30'; Oli Mathis 37'; Daniel Sinkinson 50'; Con: Tepaea Cook-Savage (5/5) 11', 14', 30', 39', 51'; Pen: Austin Anderson (1/1) 79'

Forsyth Barr Stadium, Dunedin
Referee: Jackson Henshaw

29 August 2026
19:10 NZST

Manawatu	43–40	North Harbour
Try: Reece MacDonald 9'; Mosese Bason 16'; Taine Roiri 23'; Kyle Brown 57'; Con: George Worboys (4/4) 10', 17', 24', 58'; Pen: George Worboys (5/5) 7', 31', 42', 47', 49'	Report	Try: George Reeves (2) 11', 39'; Jack Lee 34'; Oscar Koller 55'; Coby Miln (2) 67', 70'; Con: Coby Miln (5/6) 12', 35', 40', 56', 67'

Central Energy Trust Arena, Palmerston North
Referee: Paul Williams

30 August 2026
14:05 NZST

Wellington	35–46	Counties Manukau
Try: Alex Hewitt 13'; Reo Matsushita 24'; Hugo Plummer 29'; Divad Palu 59'; Riley Williams 62'; Con: Cameron Burgess (5/5) 14', 25', 30', 60', 63'	Report	Try: Sione Molia (2) 3', 34'; Ian West-Stevens (2) 21', 40+1'; Jimmy Tupou 43'; AJ Alatimu 48'; Cam Church 53'; Con: AJ Alatimu (4/7) 3', 35', 40+2', 44'; Pen: Gibson Popoali'i (1/2) 80+1'; Cards: Leo Ngatai-Tafau (yellow card) 28'

Hnry Stadium, Wellington
Referee: Maggie Cogger-Orr

30 August 2026
17:05 NZST

RS – Northland	20–10	Tasman
Try: Jordan Trainor 25'; Rivez Reihana 76'; Con: Rivez Reihana (2/2) 26', 77'; Pen: Rivez Reihana (2/2) 5', 70'	Report	Try: Eli Oudenryn 17'; Con: William Havili (1/1) 18'; Pen: William Havili (1/1) 29'; Cards: Ryan Coxon (yellow card) 74'

Semenoff Stadium, Whangārei
Referee: Todd Petrie

=== Week 6 ===
3 September 2026
19:10 NZST

Taranaki	28–12	Auckland
Try: JJ Pokai (2) 22', 36'; Scott Jury 60'; Kini Naholo 78'; Con: Sam Clarke (3/3) 23', 37', 61'; Jamie Viljoen (1/1) 79'	Report	Try: Randall Baker 33'; Payton Spencer 55'; Con: Alex Harford (1/2) 34'

Stadium Taranaki, New Plymouth
Referee: Todd Petrie

4 September 2026
19:10 NZST

Hawke's Bay	35–24	Otago
Try: Folau Fakatava 22'; Kianu Kereru-Symes 34'; Cooper Flanders 63'; Bailyn Sullivan 72'; Harry Godfrey 76'; Con: Harry Godfrey (5/5) 23', 35', 64', 73', 77'	Report	Try: Lucas Casey (2) 7', 25'; Jae Broomfield 14'; Henry Bell 29'; Con: Cam Millar (2/4) 8', 30'; Cards: Lucas Casey (yellow card) 69'

McLean Park, Napier
Referee: Ben Woolerton

5 September 2026
14:05 NZST

Bay of Plenty	12–29	Manawatu
Try: Regan Ware 7'; Tevita Mafileo 39'; Con: Jason Robertson (1/2) 40'	Report	Try: Mosese Bason 51'; Joseph Gavigan 60'; Feleti Sae-Taʻufoʻou 68'; Rory Woods 74'; Con: George Worboys (1/1) 51'; Reece MacDonald (2/3) 61', 75'; Pen: Reece MacDonald (1/1) 80'

Tauranga Domain, Tauranga
Referee: Mike Winter

5 September 2026
17:05 NZST

Tasman	42–28	Wellington
Try: David Havili 9'; Eli Oudenryn 47'; Johnny Lee 54'; Macca Springer 58'; Maloni Kunawave 66'; Kyren Taumoefolau 70'; Con: William Havili (3/3) 10', 47', 55'; Cooper Grant (3/3) 59', 67', 71'	Report	Try: Divad Palu 19'; Dominic Ropeti 24'; Du'Plessis Kirifi 67'; Logan Henry 78'; Con: Callum Harkin (4/4) 20', 25', 68', 79'; Cards: Callum Harkin (yellow card) 57'

Lansdowne Park, Blenheim
Referee: Jackson Henshaw

5 September 2026
19:10 NZST

Waikato	14–36	Canterbury
Try: Manaaki Boyle-Tiatia 8'; Austin Anderson 45'; Con: D'Angelo Leuila (2/2) 9', 46'	Report	Try: Dallas McLeod (2) 3', 42'; Finn McLeod (2) 31', 71'; Andrew Knewstubb 77'; Con: Andrew Knewstubb (4/5) 32', 43', 72', 78'; Pen: Andrew Knewstubb (1/1) 68'

FMG Stadium Waikato, Hamilton
Referee: Marcus Playle

6 September 2026
14:05 NZST

Counties Manukau	47–24	Southland
Try: Veikoso Poloniati (2) 29', 57'; Adam Morrison 33'; Ian West-Stevens 35'; Ezekiel Lindenmuth 63'; Sione Takai 69'; Gibson Popoali'i 80+1'; Con: AJ Alatimu (5/6) 30', 34', 58', 64', 70'; Jackson Rainsford (1/1) 80+2'	Report	Try: Hayata Taniyama 6'; Sean Withy 44'; Konrad Toleafoa 51'; Tayne Harvey 72'; Con: Jimmy Taylor (2/4) 52', 74'

Navigation Homes Stadium, Pukekohe
Referee: Warwick Lahmert

6 September 2026
17:05 NZST

North Harbour	57–42	Northland
Try: Leka Tuʻungafasi 5'; Cameron Howell 16'; Tristyn Cook 19'; Rory Taylor 23'; Tom Barham 34'; Kade Banks 36'; Bryn Gordon 40+1'; Coby Miln 69'; Con: Cameron Howell (6/7) 6', 17', 20', 23', 35', 37'; Coby Miln (1/1) 70'; Pen: Cameron Howell (1/1) 52'	Report	Try: James Ramm 11'; Terrell Peita 29'; Heremaia Murray 55'; Jordan Hutchings 67'; Jordan Trainor 72'; Sam Nock 76'; Con: Jade Stewart (3/3) 11', 30', 56'; Rivez Reihana (3/3) 67', 73', 76'; Cards: Brady Rush (yellow card) 33'

North Harbour Stadium, Albany
Referee: Angus Mabey

=== Week 7 ===
10 September 2026
19:10 NZST

Manawatu	27–25	Taranaki
Try: Brayden Iose (2) 15', 38'; Doug Philipson 52'; Con: Reece MacDonald (3/3) 16', 39', 53'; Pen: Reece MacDonald (2/3) 33', 80'; Cards: James Tofa (yellow card) 61'	Report	Try: Zach Landon-Lane 12'; Daniel Rona 40+1'; JJ Pokai 61'; Con: Sam Clarke (2/3) 13', 40+2'; Pen: Sam Clarke (2/2) 5', 69'

Central Energy Trust Arena, Palmerston North
Referee: Angus Mabey

11 September 2026
19:10 NZST

Otago	57–33	Tasman
Try: Patrick Pellegrini 16'; Josh Whaanga 27'; Jake Te Hiwi 35'; Lucas Casey 40+1'; Jona Nareki 44'; Riley Lucas 55'; Kieran McClea 65'; Finn Hurley 80'; Con: Patrick Pellegrini (7/8) 17', 28', 36', 40+2', 45', 66', 80+2'; Pen: Patrick Pellegrini (1/1) 74'	Report	Try: Kyren Taumoefolau 12'; Maloni Kunawave (2) 21', 47'; Macca Springer 31'; Nic Sauira 69'; Con: Cooper Grant (4/5) 13', 22', 48', 69'

Forsyth Barr Stadium, Dunedin
Referee: Paul Williams

12 September 2026
14:05 NZST

Auckland	43–33	Counties Manukau
Try: Tevita Latu 31'; James Arscott 36'; Harlyn Saunoa 38'; Xavier Tito-Harris 47'; Rico Simpson 50'; Cody Vai 76'; Con: Alex Harford (5/6) 33', 39', 48', 51', 78'; Pen: Rico Simpson (1/1) 80'	Report	Try: Alamanda Motuga 4'; Rico McQuoid 48'; Josh Gray (2) 54', 60'; Aporosa Vuniyayawa 68'; Con: AJ Alatimu (4/5) 5', 55', 61', 69'

Eden Park, Auckland
Referee: Mike Winter

12 September 2026
17:05 NZST

RS – Northland	34–17	Waikato
Try: Lachlan Hooper (2) 15', 64'; Sam Nock 29'; James Ramm 46'; Brady Rush 72'; Con: Rivez Reihana (3/5) 16', 65', 73'; Pen: Rivez Reihana (1/1) 40+1'; Cards: Jordan Trainor (yellow card) 78'	Report	Try: Daniel Sinkinson 21'; Tepaea Cook-Savage 57'; Sean Ralph 79'; Con: Taha Kemara (1/3) 79'

Semenoff Stadium, Whangārei
Referee: Fraser Hannon

12 September 2026
19:10 NZST

Canterbury	66–19	Wellington
Try: Corey Kellow 2'; Dallas McLeod (2) 6', 20'; Louie Chapman 10'; Xavier Treacy (2) 29', 80'; Jone Rova 40'; Kurtis MacDonald 42'; Ngane Punivai 70'; George Bell 75'; Con: James White (5/6) 3', 7', 21', 30', 40+1'; Andrew Knewstubb (3/4) 43', 70', 76'	Report	Try: Matt Proctor 39'; Jake Turnbull 57'; Losi Filipo 61'; Con: Callum Harkin (2/3) 58', 62'

One NZ Stadium, Christchurch
Referee: Maggie Cogger-Orr

13 September 2026
14:05 NZST

Hawke's Bay	24–31	North Harbour
Try: Nic Benn 15'; Zarn Sullivan 25'; Geoff Cridge 54'; Folau Fakatava 57'; Con: Harry Godfrey (2/4) 55', 58'; Cards: Bailyn Sullivan (yellow card) 10'; Sam Smith (yellow card) 51'	Report	Try: Jed Melvin 20'; Israel Leota 39'; Oscar Koller 61'; Kade Banks (2) 67', 72'; Con: Cameron Howell (3/5) 20', 62', 73'; Cards: Toma Laumalili (yellow card) 76'

McLean Park, Napier
Referee: Marcus Playle

13 September 2026
17:05 NZST

Southland	43–12	Bay of Plenty
Try: Glen Vaihu (2) 11', 29'; Michael Manson 38'; Penalty try 55'; Shaun Kempton 63'; Mika Muliaina 66'; Gregor Rutledge 72'; Con: Jimmy Taylor (3/6) 12', 64', 67'	Report	Try: Naitoa Ah Kuoi 8'; Rory van Vugt 15'; Con: Riley Hohepa (1/2) 9'; Pen: Riley Hohepa (0/1); Cards: Kalin Felise (yellow card) 36'; Sione Tupou (yellow card) 55'; Tamiro Armstrong (yellow card) 62'

Rugby Park, Invercargill
Referee: James Doleman

=== Week 8 ===
17 September 2026
19:10 NZST

Counties Manukau	21–50	Otago
Try: Sione Molia 14'; Gibson Popoali'i 19'; Peniasi Malimali 59'; Con: AJ Alatimu (2/2) 15', 19'; Jackson Rainsford (1/1) 60'; Cards: Jimmy Tupou (yellow card) 40+2'	Report	Try: Lucas Casey 6'; Jona Nareki 22'; Ben Lopas 30'; Christian Lio-Willie 36'; Oliver Haig 51'; Saula Ma'u 57'; Slade McDowall 68'; Sam Nemec-Vial 80+1'; Con: Patrick Pellegrini (5/7) 7', 31', 37', 52', 58'; Cam Millar (0/1); Cards: Henry Bell (yellow card) 12'

Navigation Homes Stadium, Pukekohe
Referee: Marcus Playle

18 September 2026
19:10 NZST

Tasman	22–24	Auckland
Try: Macca Springer 3'; Lopeti Faifua 31'; Kyren Taumoefolau 60'; Con: William Havili (2/3) 32', 61'; Pen: William Havili (1/1) 40'	Report	Try: Harlyn Saunoa 15'; Issak Fines-Leleiwasa 25'; Payton Spencer 67'; Con: Alex Harford (3/3) 16', 26', 68'; Pen: Alex Harford (1/2) 77'

Lansdowne Park, Blenheim
Referee: James Doleman

19 September 2026
14:05 NZST

Bay of Plenty	32–17	Hawke's Bay
Try: Tamiro Armstrong 8'; Josh Bartlett 30'; Sione Tupou 49'; Cole Forbes 71'; Con: Lucas Cashmore (3/4) 9', 51', 72'; Pen: Lucas Cashmore (2/2) 40+1', 61'; Cards: Tamiro Armstrong (yellow card) 33' (yellow-red card) 79'; Nikora Broughton (yellow card) 78'	Report	Try: Folau Fakatava 23'; Tom Allen 52'; Darby Lancaster 56'; Con: Harry Godfrey (1/3) 53'; Cards: Lukas Ripley (yellow card) 39'

Tauranga Domain, Tauranga
Referee: Ben O'Keeffe

19 September 2026
17:05 NZST

Waikato	36–27	Manawatu
Try: Senita Lauaki 13'; Sean Ralph 35'; Mitch Jacobson 48'; Taha Kemara 61'; Hamilton Burr 74'; Con: Taha Kemara (4/5) 14', 49', 62', 75'; Pen: Taha Kemara (1/2) 69'	Report	Try: Hunter Kennedy 18'; Rory Woods 27'; TK Howden 40+2'; Con: George Worboys (3/3) 19', 28', 40+3'; Pen: George Worboys (2/2) 45', 64'

FMG Stadium Waikato, Hamilton
Referee: Todd Petrie

19 September 2026
19:10 NZST

Wellington	28–52	Northland
Try: Du'Plessis Kirifi (2) 6', 18'; Matolu Petaia 64'; Stanley Solomon 78'; Con: Callum Harkin (4/4) 6', 19', 65', 79'; Cards: Kenkichi Yanagawa (yellow card) 70'	Report	Try: James Ramm (2) 15', 75'; Nathan Salmon 28'; Reuben Stewart (2) 35', 45'; Grady Forbes 48'; James Mullan (2) 61', 71'; Con: Reesjan Pasitoa (4/5) 15', 36', 46', 49'; Rivez Reihana (2/3) 71', 76'

Hnry Stadium, Wellington
Referee: Nick Hogan

20 September 2026
14:05 NZST

North Harbour	24–25	Canterbury
Try: Kade Banks 26'; Sam Tuitupou 55'; Riley Tofilau (2) 62', 80'; Con: Cameron Howell (2/4) 27', 80'; Cards: Bryn Hall (yellow card) 44'	Report	Try: George Bell (3) 22', 35', 40+1'; Chay Fihaki (2) 47', 72'; Con: James White (0/5); Cards: Manumaua Letiu (yellow card) 74'; Tonga Helu (yellow card) 78'

North Harbour Stadium, Albany
Referee: Paul Williams

20 September 2026
17:05 NZST

Taranaki	55–19	Southland
Try: Meihana Grindlay 9'; Willem Ratu 21'; Quintony Ngatai 28'; Bradley Slater 40'; Jayden Sa 46'; Kini Naholo (2) 54', 58'; Jesse Parete 70'; JJ Pokai 76'; Con: Josh Jacomb (5/9) 22', 29', 59', 71', 77'	Report	Try: Jayden Henderson (2) 19', 33'; Michael Manson 62'; Con: Jimmy Taylor (2/3) 19', 34'; Cards: Clem Halaholo (yellow card) 78'

Stadium Taranaki, New Plymouth
Referee: Ben Woolerton

=== Week 9 ===
24 September 2026
19:10 NZST

Tasman	45–26	Bay of Plenty
Try: Shannon Frizell 8'; Eli Oudenryn 27'; Maloni Kunawave 31'; Cooper Roberts 37'; Kyren Taumoefolau 44'; Noah Hotham 51'; Macca Springer 76'; Con: William Havili (5/7) 28', 32', 38', 45', 52'; Cards: David Havili (yellow card) 80+3'	Report	Try: Fehi Fineanganofo (2) 3', 14'; Aisake Vakasiuola 74'; Taine Kolose 80+4'; Con: Riley Hohepa (1/2) 14'; Aaron Gibbs (2/2) 75', 80+6'

Trafalgar Park, Nelson
Referee: Reuben Keane (Australia)

25 September 2026
19:10 NZST

Auckland	34–40	Manawatu
Try: Nathaniel Pole (2) 3', 18'; Caleb Woodley 43'; Randall Baker 54'; Che Clark 72'; Siale Pahulu 80'; Con: Alex Harford (1/3) 4'; Rico Simpson (0/1); Xavi Taele (1/2) 73'; Cards: Nathaniel Pole (yellow card) 31'	Report	Try: Mosese Bason 24'; Raymond Tuputupu 36'; Liam O'Connor 48'; Rory Woods 64'; Jai Tamati 67'; Feleti Sae-Taʻufoʻou 76'; Con: Drew Wild (1/1) 25'; Reece MacDonald (1/1) 37'; Liam O'Connor (3/4) 49', 68', 77'; Cards: Reece MacDonald (yellow card) 16'; Liam O'Connor (yellow card) 80'

Eden Park, Auckland
Referee: Angus Mabey

26 September 2026
14:05 NZST

Northland	19–22	Counties Manukau – RS
Try: Sam Nock 5'; James Ramm 32'; Corey Evans 62'; Con: Rivez Reihana (2/3) 6', 33'	Report	Try: Sione Molia 21'; Gibson Popoali'i 54'; Adam Morrison 68'; Con: AJ Alatimu (2/3) 55', 69'; Pen: AJ Alatimu (1/1) 79'

Semenoff Stadium, Whangārei
Referee: Paul Williams

26 September 2026
17:05 NZST

Canterbury	34–21	Southland
Try: Corey Kellow 10'; Ngane Punivai 26'; Gus Brown (2) 40', 59'; Finlay Brewis 48'; Ollie Burra 79'; Con: James White (1/1) 11'; Andrew Knewstubb (0/4); Chay Fihaki (1/1) 80'	Report	Try: Michael Manson 24'; Sean Withy 44'; Semisi Tupou Ta'eiloa 74'; Con: Jimmy Taylor (1/1) 25'; Mika Muliaina (2/2) 45', 75'

One NZ Stadium, Christchurch
Referee: Todd Petrie

26 September 2026
19:10 NZST

North Harbour	32–21	Otago
Try: Sam Tuitupou 34'; Rory Taylor 43'; George Reeves 46'; Oscar Koller 64'; Con: Cameron Howell (3/4) 35', 47', 65'; Pen: Cameron Howell (1/1) 40+2'; Coby Miln (1/1) 73'	Report	Try: Sam Nemec-Vial 10'; Kieran McClea 13'; Finn Hurley 78'; Con: Cam Millar (3/3) 10', 14', 79'

North Harbour Stadium, Albany
Referee: Mike Winter

27 September 2026
14:05 NZDT

Wellington	10–34	Waikato
Try: Stanley Solomon 2'; Sekope Lopeti-Moli 67'; Con: Callum Harkin (0/2); Cards: Du'Plessis Kirifi (yellow card) 30'	Report	Try: Sean Ralph 15'; Jahrome Brown (2) 20', 59'; Sefo Kautai 32'; Daiki Nakajima 77'; Con: Taha Kemara (3/4) 16', 20', 32'; D'Angelo Leuila (0/1); Pen: D'Angelo Leuila (1/1) 74'

Hnry Stadium, Wellington
Referee: Reuben Keane (Australia)

27 September 2026
17:05 NZDT

Hawke's Bay	14–50	Taranaki
Try: Lukas Ripley 62'; Hunter Morrison 78'; Con: Harry Godfrey (2/2) 63', 78'; Cards: Cooper Flanders (yellow card) 37'	Report	Try: Bradley Slater (2) 17', 43'; Josh Lord 20'; Arese Poliko 24'; Adam Lennox 52'; Jacob Ratumaitavuki-Kneepkens 53'; JJ Pokai 67'; Seta Tamanivalu 76; Con: Josh Jacomb (5/6) 17', 21', 25', 53', 54'; Sam Clarke (0/2)

McLean Park, Napier
Referee: Stuart Curran

=== Week 10 ===
1 October 2026
19:10 NZDT

Otago	45–42	Auckland
Try: Nic Souchon 20'; Joseva Tamani 32'; Sam Nemec-Vial 40'; Finn Hurley 47'; Christian Lio-Willie 51'; Moana Takataka 60'; Con: Cam Millar (6/6) 21', 33', 40+1', 48', 52', 61'; Pen: Cam Millar (1/1) 80+2'; Drop: Cam Millar (0/1)	Report	Try: Cody Vai (2) 13', 71'; James Arscott 15'; Xavi Taele (2) 29', 56'; Garouw Basson 36'; Con: Stephen Perofeta (6/6) 14', 16', 30', 37', 57', 72'

Forsyth Barr Stadium, Dunedin
Referee: Jackson Henshaw

2 October 2026
19:10 NZDT

Southland	14–28	Northland
Try: Paula Latu 21'; Michael Manson 31'; Con: Mika Muliaina (2/2) 21', 32'	Report	Try: Grady Forbes 5'; Reesjan Pasitoa 23'; Corey Evans 72'; Heath MacEwan 79'; Con: Rivez Reihana (4/4) 6', 24', 73', 80'

Rugby Park, Invercargill
Referee: Fraser Hannon

3 October 2026
14:05 NZDT

Manawatu	12–22	Canterbury
Try: Brayden Iose 38'; John Tapueluelu 67'; Con: Liam O'Connor (0/1); George Worboys (1/1) 68'	Report	Try: George Bell 35'; Jone Rova 40+3'; Dominic Gardiner 52'; Xavier Treacy 58'; Con: Andrew Knewstubb (0/2); Chay Fihaki (1/2) 53'; Cards: Lewis Ponini (yellow card) 73'

Central Energy Trust Arena, Palmerston North
Referee: Ben O'Keeffe

3 October 2026
17:05 NZDT

RS – Counties Manukau	12–7	Hawke's Bay
Try: Adam Brash 11'; Melani Matavao 27'; Con: AJ Alatimu (1/2) 28'; Pen: AJ Alatimu (0/1)	Report	Try: Darby Lancaster 61'; Con: Harry Godfrey (1/1) 62'

Navigation Homes Stadium, Pukekohe
Referee: James Doleman

3 October 2026
19:10 NZDT

Waikato	33–50	Tasman
Try: Waisake Salabiau 20'; Hamilton Burr 35'; Sean Ralph 44'; Penalty try 68'; Manaaki Boyle-Tiatia 80+2'; Con: Taha Kemara (2/3) 21', 36'; D'Angelo Leuila (1/1) 80+3'	Report	Try: Johnny Lee 18'; David Havili 23'; Kyren Taumoefolau (4) 31', 54', 62', 79'; Macca Springer 51'; Cooper Roberts 77'; Con: William Havili (4/6) 19', 24', 32', 52'; Maloni Kunawave (1/2) 78'

FMG Stadium Waikato, Hamilton
Referee: Warwick Lahmert

4 October 2026
14:05 NZDT

Taranaki	68–26	Wellington
Try: Arese Poliko (2) 3', 78'; Kini Naholo 7'; Bradley Slater 13'; Reuben O'Neill 18'; Adam Lennox 37'; Jacob Ratumaitavuki-Kneepkens 48'; Jayden Sa 58'; Keightley Watson 69'; Logan Crowley 72'; Con: Josh Jacomb (9/10) 4', 8', 14', 19', 37', 49', 70', 73', 79'	Report	Try: Callum Harkin (2) 16', 34'; Dominic Ropeti 24'; William Davis-Lenz 74'; Con: Stanley Solomon (3/3) 17', 24', 35'; Callum Harkin (0/1)

Stadium Taranaki, New Plymouth
Referee: Marcus Playle

4 October 2026
16:35 NZDT

Bay of Plenty	38–21	North Harbour
Try: Fehi Fineanganofo (2) 10', 36'; Cole Forbes 22'; Richard Judd 48'; Joe Webber (2) 52', 54'; Con: Lucas Cashmore (4/6) 23', 49', 53', 55'	Report	Try: Tom Barham 4'; Rory Taylor 17'; Riley Tofilau 66'; Con: Cameron Howell (2/2) 4', 18'; Coby Miln (1/1) 67'; Cards: Sam Tuitupou (yellow card) 43'; Dane Sawers (yellow card) 58'

Tauranga Domain, Tauranga
Referee: Angus Mabey

== Play-offs ==
Quarter-finals
1	Canterbury	62
8	Waikato	26
4	North Harbour	31
5	Taranaki	50
2	Northland	26
7	Tasman	21
3	Otago	50
6	Hawke's Bay	14

Semi-finals
Canterbury	38
Taranaki	28
Northland	38
Otago	19

Final
Canterbury	43
Northland	24

=== Quarter-finals ===
9 October 2026
19:10 NZDT

Northland	26–21	Tasman
Try: Brady Rush 37'; Lachlan Hooper 40+1'; Terrell Peita 51'; Ricki Heremaia 74'; Con: Rivez Reihana (3/4) 40+2', 52', 75'	Report	Try: Johnny Lee 4'; Kyren Taumoefolau 20'; Dylan Irvine 77'; Con: William Havili (3/3) 5', 21', 78'

Semenoff Stadium, Whangārei
Referee: Angus Mabey

10 October 2026
14:35 NZDT

North Harbour	31–50	Taranaki
Try: Rory Taylor (2) 2', 34'; Sam Wye 65'; Hunter Rice (2) 76', 80+1'; Con: Cameron Howell (3/5) 3', 34', 65'	Report	Try: Kini Naholo (2) 12', 44'; Bradley Slater (3) 36', 51', 57'; Michael Loft 40+3'; Jacob Ratumaitavuki-Kneepkens 58'; Vereniki Tikoisolomone 61'; Con: Sam Clarke (5/8) 37', 45', 57', 59', 62'; Cards: Meihana Grindlay (yellow card) 31'; Kaylum Boshier (yellow card) 80'

North Harbour Stadium, Albany
Referee: Ben O'Keeffe

10 October 2026
16:05 NZDT

Otago	50–14	Hawke's Bay
Try: Christian Lio-Willie 7'; Kieran McClea 16'; Saula Ma'u 29'; Henry Bell 47'; Sam Nemec-Vial 57'; Joel Lam 64'; Harry Irving 75'; Con: Cam Millar (5/6) 8', 17', 30', 58', 65'; Patrick Pellegrini (1/1) 76'; Pen: Cam Millar (1/1) 40+1'; Cards: Joseva Tamani (yellow card) 51'	Report	Try: Folau Fakatava 24'; Penalty try 51'; Con: Harry Godfrey (1/1) 25'

Forsyth Barr Stadium, Dunedin
Referee: Marcus Playle

11 October 2026
13:35 NZDT

Canterbury	62–26	Waikato
Try: Brodie McAlister (3) 6', 24', 40'; Johnny McNicholl 11'; Dallas McLeod 17'; Kurtis MacDonald 26'; Dominic Gardiner 33'; Andrew Knewstubb 67'; Tahlor Cahill 69'; Tyson Belworthy 73'; Con: Isaac Hutchinson (6/10) 7', 12', 18', 40+1', 70', 74'	Report	Try: Mason Tupaea 28'; Austin Anderson 43'; Waisake Salabiau (2) 55', 77'; Con: Taha Kemara (1/1) 29'; D'Angelo Leuila (2/3) 44', 56'

One NZ Stadium, Christchurch
Referee: Fraser Hannon

=== Semi-finals ===
16 October 2026
19:10 NZDT

Northland	38–19	Otago
Try: Marcel Renata (2) 9', 40+4'; Heremaia Murray 58'; Nathan Salmon 77'; Con: Rivez Reihana (3/4) 10', 40+5', 59'; Pen: Rivez Reihana (4/4) 30', 63', 71', 75'	Report	Try: Kieran McClea 22'; Christian Lio-Willie 37'; Jona Nareki 80'; Con: Cam Millar (2/3) 23', 38'

Semenoff Stadium, Whangārei
Referee: Paul Williams

18 October 2026
15:35 NZDT

Canterbury	38–28	Taranaki
Try: Corey Kellow 15'; Kurtis MacDonald 23'; Xavier Treacy 27'; Sam Darry 35'; Jone Rova 43'; Isaac Hutchinson 61'; Con: Isaac Hutchinson (4/6) 16', 24', 28', 44'	Report	Try: Seta Tamanivalu 21'; Meihana Grindlay (2) 53', 67'; Kaylum Boshier 56'; Con: Josh Jacomb (4/4) 22', 54', 57', 68'; Cards: Fiti Sa (yellow card) 14'

One NZ Stadium, Christchurch
Referee: Ben O'Keeffe

=== Final ===
26 October 2026
14:10 NZDT

Canterbury	43–24	Northland
Try: Dominic Gardiner 6'; Brodie McAlister 30'; George Bell (2) 50', 55'; Isaac Hutchinson (2) 63', 74'; Tyson Belworthy 79'; Con: Andrew Knewstubb (0/2); Chay Fihaki (4/5) 51', 56', 64', 75'		Try: Heremaia Murray 15'; Jordan Trainor 26'; Corey Evans 39'; Con: Rivez Reihana (3/3) 16', 27', 40'; Pen: Rivez Reihana (1/1) 59'

One NZ Stadium, Christchurch
Referee: James Doleman

Canterbury	Northland

LP	1	Finlay Brewis		(substituted off) 75'
HK	2	Brodie McAlister (c)		(substituted off) 46'
TP	3	Seb Calder		(substituted off) 64'
LL	4	Jamie Hannah
RL	5	Sam Darry		(substituted off) 60'
BF	6	Xavier Treacy		(substituted off) 51'
OF	7	Corey Kellow
N8	8	Dominic Gardiner
SH	9	Louie Chapman		(substituted off) 64'
FH	10	Andrew Knewstubb	(yellow card) 11'
LW	11	Kurtis MacDonald		(substituted off) 60'
IC	12	Jone Rova		(substituted off) 76'
OC	13	Dallas McLeod
RW	14	Chay Fihaki
FB	15	Johnny McNicholl
Replacements:
HK	16	George Bell		(substituted on) 46'
PR	17	Lewis Ponini		(substituted on) 75'
PR	18	Gus Brown		(substituted on) 64'
LK	19	Tahlor Cahill		(substituted on) 60'
FL	20	Torian Barnes		(substituted on) 51'
SH	21	Tyson Belworthy		(substituted on) 64'
CE	22	James Cameron		(substituted on) 76'
WG	23	Isaac Hutchinson		(substituted on) 60'

LP	1	Esile Fono		(substituted off) 65'
HK	2	James Mullan		(substituted off) 64'
TP	3	Marcel Renata		(substituted off) 57'
LL	4	Josh Goodhue		(substituted off) 72'
RL	5	Allan Craig
BF	6	Grady Forbes
OF	7	Lachlan Hooper
N8	8	Terrell Peita		(substituted off) 72'
SH	9	Sam Nock	(yellow card) 49'	(substituted off) 66'
FH	10	Rivez Reihana (c)
LW	11	Brady Rush		(substituted off) 12'	(substituted on) 21'
IC	12	Reesjan Pasitoa		(substituted off) 57'
OC	13	Corey Evans
RW	14	Heremaia Murray		(substituted off) 66'
FB	15	Jordan Trainor
Replacements:
HK	16	Jordan Hutchings		(substituted on) 64'
PR	17	Olly Ryan		(substituted on) 65'
PR	18	Daniel Botha		(substituted on) 57'
LK	19	Heath MacEwan		(substituted on) 72'
FL	20	Darcy Holwell		(substituted on) 72'
SH	21	Josh Renton		(substituted on) 66'
CE	22	Hudson Creighton		(substituted on) 57'
WG	23	Nathan Salmon		(substituted on) 12'	(substituted off) 21'	(substituted on) 66'

== Statistics ==
=== Leading point scorers ===
No.	Player	Team	Points	Average	Details
1	Rivez Reihana	Northland	128	9.85	3 T, 43 C, 9 P, 0 D
2	Kyren Taumoefolau	Tasman	95	8.64	19 T, 0 C, 0 P, 0 D
3	Harry Godfrey	Hawke's Bay	84	8.40	2 T, 34 C, 2 P, 0 D
3	Cam Millar	Otago	84	7.00	0 T, 36 C, 4 P, 0 D
5	Cameron Howell	North Harbour	82	8.20	2 T, 30 C, 4 P, 0 D
6	Taha Kemara	Waikato	72	7.20	3 T, 27 C, 1 P, 0 D
7	William Havili	Tasman	71	7.10	0 T, 31 C, 3 P, 0 D
8	Sam Clarke	Taranaki	59	4.92	2 T, 20 C, 3 P, 0 D
9	George Worboys	Manawatu	58	7.25	1 T, 13 C, 9 P, 0 D
10	AJ Alatimu	Counties Manukau	56	5.60	1 T, 24 C, 1 P, 0 D
10	Coby Miln	North Harbour	56	7.00	5 T, 14 C, 1 P, 0 D

Source: The weekly reviews of the matches published on provincial.rugby (see "Report" in the individual match scoring stats).

=== Leading try scorers ===
No.	Player	Team	Tries	Average
1	Kyren Taumoefolau	Tasman	19	1.73
2	Lucas Casey	Otago	10	0.91
3	Sam Nemec-Vial	Otago	9	0.75
4	George Bell	Canterbury	7	1.40
4	Folau Fakatava	Hawke's Bay	7	0.64
4	Dallas McLeod	Canterbury	7	0.64
4	Kini Naholo	Taranaki	7	0.78
4	Waisake Salabiau	Waikato	7	0.78
4	Bradley Slater	Taranaki	7	1.17
4	Rory Taylor	North Harbour	7	0.64

Source: The weekly reviews of the matches published on provincial.rugby (see "Report" in the individual match scoring stats).

=== Points by game ===
Team	1		2		3		4		5		6		7		8		9		10		Total		Average	
Auckland	31	38	34	31	31	44	19	27	19	22	12	28	43	33	24	22	34	40	42	45	289	330	28.90	33.00
Bay of Plenty	26	38	34	31	28	33	28	24	22	19	12	29	12	43	32	17	26	45	38	21	258	300	25.80	30.00
Canterbury	38	31	19	15	33	28	12	36	26	40	36	14	66	19	25	24	34	21	22	12	311	240	31.10	24.00
Counties Manukau	5	20	19	59	35	50	12	45	46	35	47	24	33	43	21	50	22	19	12	7	252	352	25.20	35.20
Hawke's Bay	52	33	50	19	44	31	59	17	36	21	35	24	24	31	17	32	14	50	7	12	338	270	33.80	27.00
Manawatu	14	40	36	35	27	29	17	59	43	40	29	12	27	25	27	36	40	34	12	22	272	332	27.20	33.20
North Harbour	29	31	59	19	47	7	27	19	40	43	57	42	31	24	24	25	32	21	21	38	367	269	36.70	26.90
Northland	40	14	31	34	42	0	36	12	20	10	42	57	34	17	52	28	19	22	28	14	344	208	34.40	20.80
Otago	41	14	15	19	29	27	61	22	43	38	24	35	57	33	50	21	21	32	45	42	386	283	38.60	28.30
Southland	14	41	35	36	32	31	17	46	21	36	24	47	43	12	19	55	21	34	14	28	240	366	24.00	36.60
Taranaki	20	5	32	38	0	42	24	28	40	26	28	12	25	27	55	19	50	14	68	26	342	237	34.20	23.70
Tasman	31	29	19	50	50	35	46	17	10	20	42	28	33	57	22	24	45	26	50	33	348	319	34.80	31.90
Waikato	38	26	38	32	31	32	45	12	38	43	14	36	17	34	36	27	34	10	33	50	324	302	32.40	30.20
Wellington	33	52	31	34	7	47	22	61	35	46	28	42	19	66	28	52	10	34	26	68	239	502	23.90	50.20

Source: National Provincial Championship fixtures & results

=== Tries by game ===
Team	1		2		3		4		5		6		7		8		9		10		Total		Average	
Auckland	4	6	6	5	5	6	3	4	3	3	2	4	6	5	3	3	6	6	6	6	44	48	4.40	4.80
Bay of Plenty	4	5	5	5	4	5	4	4	3	3	2	4	2	7	4	3	4	7	6	3	38	46	3.80	4.60
Canterbury	6	4	3	2	5	4	2	5	4	6	5	2	10	3	5	4	6	3	4	2	50	35	5.00	3.50
Counties Manukau	1	3	3	9	5	7	2	7	7	5	7	4	5	6	3	8	3	3	2	1	38	53	3.80	5.30
Hawke's Bay	8	5	8	3	6	5	9	3	6	3	5	4	4	5	3	4	2	8	1	2	52	42	5.20	4.20
Manawatu	2	6	6	5	3	5	3	9	4	6	4	2	3	3	3	5	6	6	2	4	36	51	3.60	5.10
North Harbour	4	5	9	3	7	1	4	3	6	4	8	6	5	4	4	5	4	3	3	6	54	40	5.40	4.00
Northland	6	2	5	5	6	0	5	2	2	1	6	8	5	3	8	4	3	3	4	2	50	30	5.00	3.00
Otago	7	2	2	3	5	3	9	3	6	5	4	5	8	5	8	3	3	4	6	6	58	39	5.80	3.90
Southland	2	7	5	6	4	5	3	8	3	6	4	7	7	2	3	9	3	6	2	4	36	60	3.60	6.00
Taranaki	3	1	5	6	0	6	4	4	6	4	4	2	3	3	9	3	8	2	10	4	52	35	5.20	3.50
Tasman	5	4	3	8	7	5	8	3	1	2	6	4	5	8	3	3	7	4	8	5	53	46	5.30	4.60
Waikato	5	4	6	5	5	4	7	2	5	6	2	5	3	5	5	3	5	2	5	8	48	44	4.80	4.40
Wellington	5	8	5	6	1	7	3	9	5	7	4	6	3	10	4	8	2	5	4	10	36	76	3.60	7.60

For	Against

Source: The weekly reviews of the matches published on provincial.rugby (see "Report" in the individual match scoring stats).

=== Discipline ===
Player	Team	Red	Yellow	Sent off match(es)
Tamiro Armstrong	Bay of Plenty	1	3	Week 8 (vs. Hawke's Bay); Week 2 (vs. Northland); Week 7 (vs. Southland); Week 8 (vs. Hawke's Bay)
Josh Beehre	Auckland	1	0	Week 3 (vs. Hawke's Bay)
Nikora Broughton	Bay of Plenty	0	2	Week 4 (vs. Taranaki); Week 8 (vs. Hawke's Bay)
Callum Harkin	Wellington	0	2	Week 2 (vs. Auckland); Week 6 (vs. Tasman)
Manumaua Letiu	Canterbury	0	2	Week 2 (vs. Otago); Week 8 (vs. North Harbour)
James Tofa	Manawatu	0	2	Week 3 (vs. Otago); Week 7 (vs. Taranaki)
AJ Alatimu	Counties Manukau	0	1	Week 2 (vs. North Harbour)
Austin Anderson	Waikato	0	1	Week 2 (vs. Taranaki)
Randall Baker	Auckland	0	1	Week 3 (vs. Hawke's Bay)
Henry Bell	Otago	0	1	Week 8 (vs. Counties Manukau)
Kaylum Boshier	Taranaki	0	1	Quarter-final (vs. North Harbour)
Jae Broomfield	Otago	0	1	Week 4 (vs. Wellington)
Lucas Casey	Otago	0	1	Week 6 (vs. Hawke's Bay)
Lucas Cashmore	Bay of Plenty	0	1	Week 4 (vs. Taranaki)
Ryan Coxon	Tasman	0	1	Week 5 (vs. Northland)
Hudson Creighton	Northland	0	1	Week 2 (vs. Bay of Plenty)
Kalin Felise	Bay of Plenty	0	1	Week 7 (vs. Southland)
Cooper Flanders	Hawke's Bay	0	1	Week 9 (vs. Taranaki)
Neria Fomai	Hawke's Bay	0	1	Week 1 (vs. Wellington)
Dominic Gardiner	Canterbury	0	1	Week 5 (vs. Taranaki)
Meihana Grindlay	Taranaki	0	1	Quarter-final (vs. North Harbour)
Clem Halaholo	Southland	0	1	Week 8 (vs. Taranaki)
Bryn Hall	North Harbour	0	1	Week 8 (vs. Canterbury)
David Havili	Tasman	0	1	Week 9 (vs. Bay of Plenty)
Tonga Helu	Canterbury	0	1	Week 8 (vs. North Harbour)
TK Howden	Manawatu	0	1	Week 4 (vs. Hawke's Bay)
Du'Plessis Kirifi	Wellington	0	1	Week 9 (vs. Waikato)
Andrew Knewstubb	Canterbury	0	1	Final (vs. Northland)
Toma Laumalili	North Harbour	0	1	Week 7 (vs. Hawke's Bay)
Frank Lochore	Hawke's Bay	0	1	Week 5 (vs. Southland)
Reece MacDonald	Manawatu	0	1	Week 9 (vs. Auckland)
Johnny McNicholl	Canterbury	0	1	Week 3 (vs. Bay of Plenty)
Adam Morrison	Counties Manukau	0	1	Week 4 (vs. Waikato)
Jona Nareki	Otago	0	1	Week 3 (vs. Manawatu)
Leo Ngatai-Tafau	Counties Manukau	0	1	Week 5 (vs. Wellington)
Sam Nock	Northland	0	1	Final (vs. Canterbury)
Liam O'Connor	Manawatu	0	1	Week 9 (vs. Auckland)
Marika Parker	Taranaki	0	1	Week 1 (vs. Counties Manukau)
Penieli Poasa	Wellington	0	1	Week 3 (vs. North Harbour)
Nathaniel Pole	Auckland	0	1	Week 9 (vs. Manawatu)
Lewis Ponini	Canterbury	0	1	Week 10 (vs. Manawatu)
Lukas Ripley	Hawke's Bay	0	1	Week 8 (vs. Bay of Plenty)
Brady Rush	Northland	0	1	Week 6 (vs. North Harbour)
Fiti Sa	Taranaki	0	1	Semi-final (vs. Canterbury)
Dane Sawers	North Harbour	0	1	Week 10 (vs. Bay of Plenty)
Sam Smith	Hawke's Bay	0	1	Week 7 (vs. North Harbour)
Bailyn Sullivan	Hawke's Bay	0	1	Week 7 (vs. North Harbour)
Tony Tafa	North Harbour	0	1	Week 3 (vs. Wellington)
Joseva Tamani	Otago	0	1	Quarter-final (vs. Hawke's Bay)
Bradley Tocker	Taranaki	0	1	Week 3 (vs. Northland)
Jordan Trainor	Northland	0	1	Week 7 (vs. Waikato)
James Tucker	Waikato	0	1	Week 4 (vs. Counties Manukau)
Sam Tuitupou	North Harbour	0	1	Week 10 (vs. Bay of Plenty)
Jimmy Tupou	Counties Manukau	0	1	Week 8 (vs. Otago)
Sione Tupou	Bay of Plenty	0	1	Week 7 (vs. Southland)
Ian West-Stevens	Counties Manukau	0	1	Week 4 (vs. Waikato)
Kenkichi Yanagawa	Wellington	0	1	Week 8 (vs. Northland)

== Ranfurly Shield ==
=== Pre-season challenges ===
On 9 March 2026, Otago Rugby announced that North Otago and 2025 Meads Cup winners Mid Canterbury were the Heartland Championship teams to challenge Otago for the Ranfurly Shield in 2026.

Otago Rugby confirmed on 18 May 2026 that the game against North Otago would be played on Tuesday 16 June 2026 at Forsyth Barr Stadium, Dunedin, while the game against Mid Canterbury was scheduled for Friday 24 July 2026 at Molyneux Park in Alexandra.

16 June 2026
18:30 NZST

Otago	46–14	North Otago
Try: Josh Whaanga (2) 4', 47'; Toni Taufa (2) 18', 24'; Harry Irving 29'; Liam Coltman 37'; Riley Lucas 40+1'; Jake Te Hiwi 71'; Con: Rique Miln (1/5) 19'; Mackenzie Palmer (2/3) 40+2', 48'; Cards: Ben Lopas (yellow card) 56'	Report	Try: Kelepi Funaki 57'; Ratu Logavatu 80+4'; Con: Ben McCarthy (1/1) 57'; Isaac Clunie (1/1) 80+5'; Pen: Ben McCarthy (0/1)

Forsyth Barr Stadium, Dunedin
Attendance: 2,138
Referee: Jackson Henshaw

24 July 2026
14:30 NZST

Otago	78–14	Mid Canterbury
Try: Finn Hurley 1'; Kieran McClea (2) 6', 53'; Charles Elton 11'; Ben Lopas 14'; Cam Millar 19'; Lucas Casey 25'; Sam Nemec-Vial (3) 37', 57', 80+1'; Jona Nareki 49'; Harry Irving 68'; Con: Cam Millar (7/10) 12', 20', 26’, 38', 50', 54', 58'; Mackenzie Palmer (2/2) 69', 80+2'; Cards: Jona Nareki (yellow card) 33'; Marley Pearce (yellow card) 70'	Report	Try: Manasa Samo 46'; Jordy Gray 61'; Con: Ben Innes (2/2) 47', 62'

Molyneux Park, Alexandra
Referee: Fraser Hannon
