= Dallas Rata-Makene =

New Zealand rugby union player

- Born: New Zealand
- School: Hamilton Boys' High School

Rugby union career
- Position: First five-eighth / Fullback
- Current team: Chiefs / Waikato
Senior career
Years	Team	Apps	(Points)
2026–	Waikato	6	(0)
2027–	Chiefs	0	(0)
- Correct as of 10 November 2026

Dallas Rata-Makene is a New Zealand rugby union player, who plays for the Chiefs. His preferred position is first five-eighth or fullback.

== Early career ==
Rata-Makene was born in New Zealand and attended Hamilton Boys' High School, where he helped the school win the First XV Championship in 2024. His school performances earned him selection for the New Zealand Maori U18 side in 2024. He earned selection for the Chiefs academy, representing their U20 side in 2025, and earned selection for the New Zealand U20 development side in 2026, before being named in the full squad later in the year, but failed to make an appearance.

== Professional career ==
Rata-Makene has represented Waikato in the National Provincial Championship since 2026, being named as an additional player in their squad for the 2026 Hilux NPC competition. In October 2026, he was named in the Chiefs wider training group for the 2027 Super Rugby Pacific season.
