= Northland (National Provincial Championship) =

NZ rugby union club, based in Whangārei, New Zealand

- NRU official logo
- Union: Northland Rugby Union
- Nickname(s): Taniwha (men) and Kauri (women)
- Founded: 1920; 106 years ago
- Location: Whangārei, New Zealand
- Ground: Semenoff Stadium (Capacity: 18,500)
- CEO: Paul Lennane
- Coach: Ryan Martin
- Captain: Rivez Reihana
- Most appearances: Joe Morgan (165)
- Top scorer: Warren Johnston (1,666)
- Most tries: Norm Berryman (71)
- League: National Provincial Championship
- 2025: 9th
Team kit

Official website
- www.northlandrugby.co.nz

Northland (often known as the Northland Taniwha) are a New Zealand professional rugby union team based in Whangārei, New Zealand. The union was originally established in 1920, with the National Provincial Championship established in 1976. They now play in the reformed National Provincial Championship competition. They play their home games at Semenoff Stadium in Whangārei in the Northland region. The team is affiliated with the Blues Super Rugby franchise. Their home playing colours are a Sky blue (Pantone 284).

== Current squad ==
The Northland Taniwha squad for the 2026 Hilux NPC season is:

2026 Northland squad
**Props**: (Australia) Daniel Botha; (New Zealand) Junior Fifita; (New Zealand) Esile Fono; (New Zealand) Ricki Heremaia; (Samoa) **Jordan Lay**; (New Zealand) Marcel Renata; (New Zealand) Olly Ryan; **Hookers**: (New Zealand) Mason Hohaia ^{WTG}; (New Zealand) Jordan Hutchings; (New Zealand) Heath MacEwan; (New Zealand) James Mullan; **Locks**: (New Zealand) Sam Caird; (New Zealand) Allan Craig; (New Zealand) Josh Goodhue; (New Zealand) Darcy Holwell ^{WTG}	**Loose forwards**: (New Zealand) Tai Clyde ^{WTG}; (New Zealand) Grady Forbes ^{WTG}; (New Zealand) Brady Foster ^{WTG}; (Australia) Lachlan Hooper; (New Zealand) Matt Letoga ^{WTG}; (New Zealand) **Simon Parker**; (New Zealand) Terrell Peita; (New Zealand) Rob Rush; (New Zealand) Zac Shanks; **Halfbacks (scrum-halves)**: (New Zealand) Cleve Barrell ^{WTG}; (New Zealand) Zion Going; (New Zealand) Ben Love ^{WTG}; (New Zealand) Marley Murphy ^{WTG}; (New Zealand) Sam Nock; (New Zealand) Josh Renton; **First five-eighths (fly-halves)**: (New Zealand) Rivez Reihana **(c)**; (New Zealand) Jade Stewart	**Midfielders (centres)**: (New Zealand) Latham Aull ^{WTG}; (Australia) Hudson Creighton; (New Zealand) Corey Evans; (New Zealand) Henare Parangi ^{WTG}; (Australia) Reesjan Pasitoa; (New Zealand) Reuben Stewart; **Outside backs**: (New Zealand) Kiwi Duncan ^{WTG}; (New Zealand) Heremaia Murray; (Australia) James Ramm; (New Zealand) Brady Rush; (New Zealand) Nathan Salmon; (New Zealand) Kobie Scutt ^{WTG}; (New Zealand) Xaviar Tenboom ^{WTG}; (New Zealand) Jordan Trainor; (New Zealand) Guy-Visachi Waerehu ^{WTG}
**(c)** denotes the team captain. **Bold** denotes internationally capped players.^{WTG} denotes a wider training group member. Source:

== Honours ==
Northland have never been overall Champions. Their full list of honours, though, include:

National Provincial Championship Second Division North Island

- Winners: 1977 (as North Auckland)

National Provincial Championship Second Division

- Winners: 1997

== Current Super Rugby players ==
Players named in the 2025 Northland Taniwha squad, who also earned contracts or were named in a squad for any side participating in the 2025 Super Rugby Pacific season.

Player	Team
Solomon Alaimalo	Moana Pasifika
Chris Apoua	Moana Pasifika
Alan Craig	Moana Pasifika
Corey Evans	Blues
Lachlan Hooper	Brumbies
Jordan Lay	Blues
Matt Moulds	Crusaders
James Mullan	Blues
Sam Nock	Blues
Simon Parker	Chiefs
Reesjan Pasitoa	Force
Rivez Reihana	Crusaders
Marcel Renata	Blues
Ofa Tu'ungafasi	Blues
