= Hunter Morrison =

New Zealand rugby union player (born 2003)

- Full name: Hunter F. Morrison
- Born: 11 January 2003 (age 23) Whanganui, New Zealand
- Height: 197 cm (6 ft 6 in)
- Weight: 115 kg (254 lb; 18 st 2 lb)
- School: Whanganui Collegiate School; Palmerston North Boys' High School

Rugby union career
- Position: Lock
- Current team: Hawke's Bay, Hurricanes
Senior career
Years	Team	Apps	(Points)
2023–	Hawke's Bay	21	(30)
2025	Urayasu D-Rocks	2	(0)
2027–	Hurricanes		
- Correct as of 25 September 2026
International career
Years	Team	Apps	(Points)
2023	New Zealand U20	3	(0)
- Correct as of 3 January 2025

Hunter Morrison (born 11 January 2003) is a New Zealand rugby union player, who currently plays as a lock for Hawke's Bay in New Zealand's domestic National Provincial Championship competition. He has signed with the Hurricanes from the 2027 Super Rugby Pacific season.

== Early career ==
Morrison was born in Whanganui in the Manawatū-Whanganui region of New Zealand. He spent his first years of secondary school at Whanganui Collegiate School and played 1st XV rugby for the school. During that time, he represented Whanganui at age grade level, including the Whanganui U16 teams that competed at the Hurricanes U16 Tournament in 2018 and 2019. He was named in the Hurricanes U16 Tournament Team in 2019. He also played cricket and basketball for Whanganui Collegiate and represented Whanganui in these sports.

In 2020, Morrison attended Palmerston North Boys' High School for his final year of secondary school education and played for the school's 1st XV team. After a good season playing for the team, he was invited to attend the NZ Barbarians Hurricanes age grade camp for under 18 talent from the Hurricanes region. In 2021, after leaving school and playing club rugby for Te Kawau RFC, he attended the Hurricanes U18 Development Camp again and signed with the Manawatū Rugby Academy. He represented Manawatū at Under 19 level that year and – although he wasn't named in the original Hurricanes U20 squad – played in two of the three games of the Hurricanes U20 team at the 2021 Super Rugby Aotearoa U20 tournament.

In March 2022, Morrison was named in the 2022 Hurricanes U20 Wider Squad. However, he missed out on a spot in the Hurricanes U20 squad for the 2022 Super Rugby U20 competition after he broke his jaw while playing club rugby. Morrison played for the Manawatū Development team later that season, but moved away from the province the following year after signing with the Hawke's Bay Rugby Union.

Morrison earned a National Development Contract and trained with the Hurricanes ahead of, and during, the 2023 Super Rugby Pacific season. On 16 March 2023, he was named in the Hurricanes U20 team for the 2023 Super Rugby U20 competition in Taupō. Although the Hurricanes U20s lost the final of the tournament to the Blues U20 team, Morrison was one of the stand-out players for the Hurricanes and scored two tries in that game.

In 2024, Morrison played for the New Zealand Barbarians in a game against New Zealand Heartland XV.

Morrison plays his local club rugby for Taradale Rugby & Sports Club. With his club, he won the Hawke's Bay premier club rugby competition (Maddison Trophy) in 2024–2026.

Morrison is of Te Āti Haunui-a-Pāpārangi, Ngāti Whātua and Ngāti Tūwharetoa descent.

== Senior career ==
On 4 July 2023, Morrison was named in the Hawke's Bay squad for the 2023 Bunnings NPC season. He made his debut for the province, off the bench, on 5 August 2023 against North Harbour. He scored his first try for the Magpies on 26 June 2024 in a successful Ranfurly Shield defence against King Country.

Morrison trained with, and played for, the Crusaders during preseason ahead of the 2025 Super Rugby Pacific season as well as for the Crusaders Development XV early during the season.

On 10 April 2025, Japan Rugby League One club Urayasu D-Rocks announced that Morrison had joined the club for the remainder of the 2024–2025 season. He made his debut for the side in the round 16 game against Toshiba Brave Lupus Tokyo on 25 April 2025. He played 2 games for the club.

The 2026 NPC season turned out to be a breakout season for Morrison, when he caught the eye of many with several man-of-the-match performances.

On 25 September 2026, that form was rewarded when the Hurricanes announced that the franchise had signed Morrison for two seasons, starting from the 2027 Super Rugby Pacific season. Morrison had played for the Hurricanes Hunters, the development team of the Hurricanes, earlier in the year.

== International career ==
In 2021, Morrison was named in the New Zealand Barbarians U18 team, but due to the travel restrictions imposed as a consequence of the Covid-19 pandemic, there weren't any international matches and scheduled games against the New Zealand Schools and New Zealand Maori U18 team were cancelled as well.

The following year, Morrison was named in the New Zealand Under 19 team for a tour to South Africa. During that tour, the team played four games against age group representative teams from Western Province, Sharks, Lions and Leopards. Morrison played in three of the games and scored three tries.

In April 2023, Morrison was named in the New Zealand Under 20 wider squad that would play two matches against Australia. Morrison played in the second match. On 6 June 2023, he was named in the New Zealand Under 20 squad for the 2023 World Rugby U20 Championship and played in two of the team's five games.
