= Keightley Watson =

New Zealand rugby union player

- Born: 17 May 2001 (age 25) Whanganui, New Zealand
- Height: 197 cm (6 ft 6 in)
- Weight: 141 kg (311 lb; 22 st 3 lb)
- School: Whanganui High School

Rugby union career
- Position: Prop
- Current team: Chiefs / Taranaki
Senior career
Years	Team	Apps	(Points)
2025–	Taranaki	14	(5)
2027–	Chiefs	0	(0)
- Correct as of 10 November 2026

Keightley Watson (born 17 May 2001) is a New Zealand rugby union player, who plays for the Chiefs. His preferred position is prop.

== Early career ==
Watso was born in Whanganui and attended Whanganui High School, where he originally partook in judo. A former Olympic hopeful, Watson earned two 'black belts' before turning his attention to rugby after leaving school. He plays his club rugby for Southern, and also played in the Heartland Championship.

== Professional career ==
Watson has represented Taranaki in the National Provincial Championship since 2025, being named in their squad for the 2026 Hilux NPC competition. In October 2026, he was named in the Chiefs wider training group for the 2027 Super Rugby Pacific season.
