= James Mullan =

New Zealand rugby union player

- Born: 20 November 2002 (age 23) New Zealand
- Height: 188 cm (6 ft 2 in)
- Weight: 112 kg (247 lb; 17 st 9 lb)
- School: Rangiora High School
- University: Ara, institute of Canterbury

Rugby union career
- Position: Hooker
- Current team: Blues, Auckland
Senior career
Years	Team	Apps	(Points)
2023–2024	Canterbury	6	(0)
2024	Crusaders	0	(0)
2025–	Blues	4	(0)
2025–	Northland	4	(15)
- Correct as of 2 December 2025

James Mullan (born 20 November 2002) is a New Zealand rugby union player, who plays for the Auckland Blues. His preferred position is hooker.

== Early career ==
Mullan attended Rangiora High School and represented New Zealand Schools. He came through the Canterbury academy and plays his club rugby for Sydenham. He represented the Crusaders U20 and development teams.

== Professional career ==
Mullan has represented Canterbury in the National Provincial Championship since 2023, being named in their full squad for the 2023 Bunnings NPC. He was called into the Crusaders squad ahead of Round 6 of the 2024 Super Rugby Pacific season, being named in the team to face the Chiefs.
