= Tom Barham =

New Zealand rugby union player

- Born: 3 June 1999 (age 27) New Zealand
- Height: 188 cm (6 ft 2 in)
- Weight: 104 kg (229 lb; 16 st 5 lb)
- School: Rosmini College

Rugby union career
- Position: Midfield
- Current team: Blues / North Harbour
Senior career
Years	Team	Apps	(Points)
2022–	North Harbour	43	(50)
2027–	Blues	0	(0)
- Correct as of 11 November 2026

Tom Barham (born 3 June 1999) is a New Zealand rugby union player, who plays for the Blues. His preferred position is midfield.

== Early career ==
Barham was born in New Zealand and attended Rosmini College. Successful in both rugby at cricket at school, he committed to rugby after school, playing his club rugby for Silverdale. He earned selection for the North Harbour U18 side in 2017.

== Professional career ==
Barham has represented North Harbour in the National Provincial Championship since 2022, being named in their squad for the 2026 Hilux NPC competition. In October 2026, he was named in the Blues wider training group for the 2027 Super Rugby Pacific season.
