= Aaron Gibbs =

New Zealand rugby union player

- Born: New Zealand
- Height: 178 cm (5 ft 10 in)
- School: Tauranga Boys' College

Rugby union career
- Position: First five-eighth
- Current team: Crusaders / Bay of Plenty
Senior career
| Years | Team | Apps | (Points) |
| 2026– | Bay of Plenty | 2 | (4) |
| 2027– | Crusaders | 0 | (0) |
- Correct as of 9 November 2026

Aaron Gibbs is a New Zealand rugby union player, who plays for the Crusaders. His preferred position is first five-eighth.

== Early career ==
Gibbs was born in New Zealand and attended Tauranga Boys' College, having previously attended Pāpāmoa College. After leaving school, he joined up with the Chiefs academy, representing their U18 side in 2023. He had also previously represented Bay of Plenty at youth level.

== Professional career ==
Gibbs has represented Bay of Plenty in the National Provincial Championship since 2026, being named in their squad for the 2026 Hilux NPC competition. In October 2026, he was named in the Crusaders wider training group for the 2027 Super Rugby Pacific season.
