= Cameron Howell =

New Zealand rugby union player

- Born: 25 June 2002 (age 24) New Zealand
- Height: 183 cm (6 ft 0 in)
- Weight: 92 kg (203 lb; 14 st 7 lb)
- School: Rosmini College

Rugby union career
- Position: First five-eighth
- Current team: Blues / North Harbour
Senior career
Years	Team	Apps	(Points)
2025–	North Harbour	20	(114)
2027–	Blues	0	(0)
- Correct as of 11 November 2026

Cameron Howell (born 25 June 2002) is a New Zealand rugby union player, who plays for the Blues. His preferred position is first five-eighth.

== Early career ==
Howell is from New Zealand and attended Rosmini College. A keen cricketer at school and for North Shore Cricket Club, he committed to rugby after school, playing his club rugby for North Shore. In 2022, he represented the Blues U20 side, while also representing North Harbour at junior level, winning the U19 player of the year award in 2022.

== Professional career ==
Howell has represented North Harbour in the National Provincial Championship since 2025, being named in their squad for the 2026 Hilux NPC competition. In October 2026, he was named in the Blues wider training group for the 2027 Super Rugby Pacific season.
