= Auckland (National Provincial Championship) =

NZ rugby union club, based in Auckland

- ARU official emblem
- Union: Auckland Rugby Union
- Founded: 1883; 143 years ago
- Location: Mount Eden, Auckland, New Zealand
- Ground: Eden Park (Capacity: 50,000)
- CEO: Jarrod Bear
- Coach: Steven Bates
- Captain(s): Josh Fusitu'a; Stephen Perofeta
- Most appearances: Grant Fox (189)
- Top scorer: Grant Fox (2,746)
- Most tries: Terry Wright (112)
- League: National Provincial Championship
- 2025: 12th
Team kit

Official website
- www.aucklandrugby.co.nz

Auckland are a New Zealand professional rugby union team based in Auckland, New Zealand. The union was originally established in 1883, with the National Provincial Championship established in 1976. They now play in the reformed National Provincial Championship competition. They play their home games at Eden Park in Auckland. The team is affiliated with the Blues Super Rugby franchise. Their home playing colours are blue and white hoops.

== Current squad ==
The Auckland squad for the 2026 Hilux NPC season is: (Note: Tevita Latu was called into the Auckland squad ahead of Round 5 on a short-term loan from Canterbury. He returned to Canterbury ahead of Round 8.)

2026 Auckland squad
| **Props**: (New Zealand) Sione Ahio; (New Zealand) Tamiano Ahloo (injured); (New Zealand) Ben Ake; (New Zealand) Sam Davies; (New Zealand) Robson Faleafa ^{ST} (Note: Faleafa wasn't named in the original Auckland squad, but was announced in the side for Round 5.); (New Zealand) Josh Fusitu'a **(cc)**; (New Zealand) **Angus Taʻavao**; (New Zealand) Tito Tuipulotu; (New Zealand) **Ofa Tuʻungafasi**; **Hookers**: (Tonga) **Jay Fonokalafi**; (New Zealand) Nathaniel Pole; (New Zealand) Soane Vikena; **Locks**: (New Zealand) Josh Beehre; (Australia) Harvey Cordukes; (New Zealand) Tai Cribb; (New Zealand) Liam Hallam-Eames; (New Zealand) Josh Tengblad (injured); (New Zealand) **Patrick Tuipulotu** | **Loose forwards**: (New Zealand) Randall Baker; (New Zealand) Che Clark; (New Zealand) Sam Hainsworth-Fa'aofo; (New Zealand) Titi Nofoagatotoa; (New Zealand) Logan Platt ^{ST} (Note: Platt wasn't named in the original Auckland squad, but was announced in the side for Round 4.); (New Zealand) **Anton Segner**; (New Zealand) Ofa Topeni; (New Zealand) Kitiona Vai; (New Zealand) Caleb Woodley; **Half-backs (scrum-halves)**: (New Zealand) James Arscott; (Australia) **Issak Fines-Leleiwasa**; (New Zealand) Taufa Funaki (injured); (Tonga) **Siaosi Nginingini**; **First five-eighths (fly-halves)**: (New Zealand) Alex Harford; (New Zealand) **Stephen Perofeta** **(cc)**; (New Zealand) Rico Simpson | **Midfielders (centres)**: (Tonga) **Pita Ahki**; (South Africa) Garouw Basson ^{ST} (Note: Basson wasn't named in the original Auckland squad, but was announced in the side for Round 1.); (Tonga) **Nikolai Foliaki** ^{ST} (Note: Foliaki wasn't named in the original Auckland squad, but was announced in the side for Round 5.); (New Zealand) **Rieko Ioane**; (New Zealand) Quinton Nichols; (New Zealand) Siale Pahulu ^{ST} (Note: Pahulu wasn't named in the original Auckland squad, but was announced in the side for Round 3.); (New Zealand) Xavi Taele; **Outside backs**: (New Zealand) **Caleb Clarke**; (New Zealand) King Maxwell; (New Zealand) Cohen Norrie; (New Zealand) Harlyn Saunoa; (New Zealand) Payton Spencer; (New Zealand) Caleb Tangitau (injured); (New Zealand) Xavier Tito-Harris; (New Zealand) Cody Vai |
(cc) denotes co-captain. **Bold** denotes internationally capped players.^{ST} denotes a short-term signing. denotes an injured player. Source:

== Honours ==
Auckland have been overall Champions on 17 occasions. Their first title was in 1982 and their most recent title was in 2018. Their full list of honours include:

National Provincial Championship First Division

- Winners: 1982, 1984, 1985, 1987, 1988, 1989, 1990, 1993, 1994, 1995, 1996, 1999, 2002, 2003, 2005

Air New Zealand Cup

- Winners: 2007

Mitre 10 Cup Premiership Division

- Winners: 2018

== Current Super Rugby players ==
Players named in the 2025 Auckland squad, who also earned contracts or were named in a squad for any side participating in the 2025 Super Rugby Pacific season.

| Player | Team |
|---|---|
| Sione Ahio | Chiefs |
| Ben Ake | Blues |
| Tom Allen | Hurricanes |
| James Arscott | Highlanders |
| Josh Beehre | Blues |
| Adrian Choat | Blues |
| Che Clark | Blues |
| Caleb Clarke | Blues |
| Tai Cribb | Highlanders |
| Taufa Funaki | Blues |
| Josh Fusitua | Blues |
| Alex Harford | Force |
| Rieko Ioane | Blues |
| AJ Lam | Blues |
| Fatongia Paea | Force |
| Stephen Perofeta | Blues |
| Nathaniel Pole | Blues |
| Mills Sanerivi | Moana Pasifika |
| Anton Segner | Blues |
| Payton Spencer | Blues |
| Angus Ta'avao | Chiefs |
| Xavi Taele | Blues |
| Caleb Tangitau | Highlanders |
| Ola Tauelangi | Moana Pasifika |
| Tanielu Teleʻa | Highlanders |
| Hamdahn Tuipulotu | Blues |
| Patrick Tuipulotu | Blues |
| Tito Tuipulotu | Moana Pasifika |
| Soane Vikena | Highlanders |
