= Noah Hotham =

New Zealand rugby union player

- Born: 23 May 2003 (age 23) Hamilton, New Zealand
- Height: 180 cm (5 ft 11 in)
- Weight: 94 kg (207 lb; 14 st 11 lb)
- School: Hamilton Boys' High School
- Notable relative: Jazmin Hotham (sister)

Rugby union career
- Position: Halfback
- Current team: Tasman, Crusaders
Senior career
Years	Team	Apps	(Points)
2021–	Tasman	32	(55)
2023–	Crusaders	47	(55)
- Correct as of 9 October 2026
International career
Years	Team	Apps	(Points)
2022–2023	New Zealand U20	8	(15)
2024–	New Zealand	3	(0)
2024	All Blacks XV	2	(0)
- Correct as of 9 October 2026

Noah Hotham (born 23 May 2003) is a New Zealand rugby union player who plays for Tasman in the Bunnings NPC and the Crusaders in Super Rugby. His position is halfback.

He competed for New Zealand Touch in the 2020 B18 Youth Trans Tasman final against Australia, playing alongside Crusaders teammate Taha Kemara.

He made his test match debut for the New Zealand national rugby union team in July 2024.

== Career ==
Hotham was named in the Tasman Mako squad as a development player for the 2021 Bunnings NPC. He made his debut for Tasman against Bay of Plenty at Trafalgar Park in a non competition match, coming off the bench in a 26–9 win for the Mako. He played his first official Bunnings NPC match in the final of the competition against Waikato in his hometown of Hamilton, with Tasman losing 23–20.

Hotham signed a 3-year deal with the Crusaders between 2023 and 2025. He made his debut for the side in Round 2 of the 2023 Super Rugby Pacific season against the Highlanders.

On 20 July 2024 Hotham made his All Blacks debut as a replacement for the injured Cortez Ratima in the 36th minute of the test match against Fiji played at Snapdragon Stadium in San Diego, California.
