= Riley Tofilau =

New Zealand rugby union player

- Born: 15 June 2005 (age 21) Samoa
- Height: 189 cm (6 ft 2 in)
- Weight: 131 kg (289 lb; 20 st 9 lb)
- School: Rosmini College

Rugby union career
- Position: Prop
- Current team: Blues / North Harbour
Senior career
Years	Team	Apps	(Points)
2026–	North Harbour	11	(15)
2027–	Blues	0	(0)
- Correct as of 11 November 2026
International career
Years	Team	Apps	(Points)
2025	New Zealand U20	2	(0)
- Correct as of 11 November 2026

Riley Tofilau (born 15 June 2005) is a Samoan-born New Zealand rugby union player, who plays for the Blues. His preferred position is prop.

== Early career ==
Tofilau is from Samoa, but grew up in Auckland attending Rosmini College. After leaving school, he joined up with the Blues academy, representing their U18 side in 2023, and U20 side in 2025. In 2025, he was selected in the New Zealand U20 side. He plays his club rugby for Northcote in the North Harbour area.

== Professional career ==
Tofilau has represented North Harbour in the National Provincial Championship since 2026, being named in their squad for the 2026 Hilux NPC competition. In October 2026, he was named in the Blues wider training group for the 2027 Super Rugby Pacific season.
