= Garouw Basson =

New Zealand rugby union player

- Born: 14 August 2006 (age 20) Welkom, South Africa
- Height: 187 cm (6 ft 2 in)
- Weight: 110 kg (243 lb; 17 st 5 lb)
- School: Botany Downs Secondary College

Rugby union career
- Position: Midfield
- Current team: Hurricanes / Auckland
Senior career
Years	Team	Apps	(Points)
2026–	Auckland	5	(5)
2027–	Hurricanes	0	(0)
- Correct as of 8 November 2026

Garouw Basson (born 14 August 2006) is a South African-born New Zealand rugby union player, who plays for the Hurricanes. His preferred position is midfield.

== Early career ==
Basson was born in Welkom, South Africa, but moved to New Zealand as a child, attending Botany Downs Secondary College. After leaving school, he was named in the Blues U18 squad in 2024, and in 2025 he represented the Auckland U19 side. He plays his club rugby for Pakuranga United.

== Professional career ==
Basson has represented Auckland in the National Provincial Championship since 2026, being named in their squad as an additional player for the 2026 Hilux NPC competition. In October 2026, he was named in the Hurricanes wider training group for the 2027 Super Rugby Pacific season.
