= Jordan Hutchings =

New Zealand rugby union player

- Born: 1 September 2002 (age 24) New Zealand
- Height: 182 cm (6 ft 0 in)
- Weight: 104 kg (229 lb; 16 st 5 lb)
- School: Rotorua Boys' High School

Rugby union career
- Position: Hooker
- Current team: Blues / Northland
Senior career
Years	Team	Apps	(Points)
2024–	Northland	18	(15)
2027–	Blues	0	(0)
- Correct as of 11 November 2026

Jordan Hutchings (born 1 September 2002) is a New Zealand rugby union player, who plays for the Blues. His preferred position is hooker.

== Early career ==
Hutchings is from New Zealand and attended Rotorua Boys' High School. After leaving school, he joined up with the Blues academy, representing their U20 side in 2021 and 2022. He plays his club rugby for the Western Sharks.

== Professional career ==
Hutchings has represented Northland in the National Provincial Championship since 2024, being named in their squad for the 2026 Hilux NPC competition. In October 2026, he was named in the Blues wider training group for the 2027 Super Rugby Pacific season.
