= Lachlan Hooper =

Australian rugby union player

- Born: 19 February 2004 (age 22) Bathurst, New South Wales, Australia
- Height: 195 cm (6 ft 5 in)
- Weight: 114 kg (251 lb; 17 st 13 lb)
- School: Barker College
- Notable relative: Tom Hooper (brother)

Rugby union career
- Position(s): Lock, Flanker
- Current team: Reds
Youth career
- Bathurst Bulldogs
Amateur team(s)
| Years | Team | Apps | (Points) |
| 2025– | Northern Suburbs | | |
Senior career
| Years | Team | Apps | (Points) |
| 2025 | Brumbies | 0 | (0) |
| 2025– | Northland | 13 | (15) |
| 2026 | Waratahs | 0 | (0) |
| 2027– | Reds | 0 | (0) |
- Correct as of 25 August 2026
International career
| Years | Team | Apps | (Points) |
| 2023 | Australia U20 | 5 | (0) |
- Correct as of 8 November 2025

Lachlan Hooper (born 19 February 2004) is an Australian rugby union player who currently plays as a lock and flanker for the Reds in the Super Rugby.

== Early life ==
Hooper was born in Bathurst, New South Wales alongside brother Tom and attended Barker College in Sydney. Growing up Hooper played for the Bathurst Bulldogs in regional New South Wales. He later joined the Northern Suburbs club in Sydney's Shute Shield competition.

Having moved to Canberra to become a member of the Brumbies academy, he played his club rugby for Tuggeranong Vikings. In 2023, Hooper earned a call-up to the Australia U20s team and played five matches for the youth side in the 2023 U20 Championship in South Africa.

== Career ==
Hooper was named in the Brumbies side for the 2025 Super Rugby Pacific season. He did not make an appearance for the side, but did play against the British & Irish Lions in their July tour. Having departed the side at the end of July, he signed for Northland for the 2025 Bunnings NPC. He was then named in the Waratahs squad for the 2026 Super Rugby Pacific season having returned to New South Wales.

In August 2026, while playing in New Zealand's National Provincial Championship for Northland, Hooper was announced as the Reds' latest signing, joining the team ahead of their 2027 season.

== Career statistics ==
=== Club ===
As of 25 August 2026.

Statistics by club, season and competition
| Club | Season | League | | | |
| Club | Season | Division | Apps | Tries | Points |
|---|---|---|---|---|---|
| Northland | 2025 | National Provincial Championship | 9 | 0 | 0 |
| Northland | 2026 | National Provincial Championship | 4 | 3 | 15 |
| Northland | Total | | 13 | 3 | 15 |
