= Jayden Henderson =

New Zealand rugby union player

- Born: 12 October 1999 (age 27) Riversdale, New Zealand
- Height: 183 cm (6 ft 0 in)
- Weight: 106 kg (234 lb; 16 st 10 lb)
- School: Otago Boys' High School
- University: Lincoln University

Rugby union career
- Position: Hooker
- Current team: Crusaders / Southland
Senior career
Years	Team	Apps	(Points)
2026–	Southland	9	(10)
2027–	Crusaders	0	(0)
- Correct as of 9 November 2026

Jayden Henderson (born 12 October 1999) is a New Zealand rugby union player, who plays for the Crusaders. His preferred position is hooker.

== Early career ==
Henderson was born in Riversdale and attended Otago Boys' High School. After leaving school he attended Lincoln University, while playing his club rugby for Star in the Southland region. In 2025, Henderson moved to Ireland where he played club rugby for Navan, before spells in Australia representing Eastwood and Gordon.

== Professional career ==
Henderson has represented Southland in the National Provincial Championship since 2026, being named as an additional player in their squad for the 2026 Hilux NPC competition. In October 2026, he was named in the Crusaders wider training group for the 2027 Super Rugby Pacific season.
