= Tai Cribb =

New Zealand rugby union player

- Born: 9 February 2004 (age 22) New Zealand

Rugby union career
- Position: Lock
- Current team: Highlanders, Waikato
Senior career
Years	Team	Apps	(Points)
2023–	Waikato	11	(0)
2025–	Highlanders	1	(0)
- Correct as of 12 April 2025
International career
Years	Team	Apps	(Points)
2024	New Zealand U20	2	(5)
- Correct as of 12 April 2025

Tai Cribb (born 2 February 2004) is a New Zealand rugby union player, who plays for Highlanders and Waikato. His preferred position is lock.

== Early career ==
Cribb plays his club rugby for Hamilton Marist, where he earned selection for the New Zealand U18 Barbarians. He also played for Te Awamutu Sports. In 2024 he was called into the New Zealand U20 squad for the U20 Rugby World Cup.

== Professional career ==
Cribb has represented Waikato in the National Provincial Championship since 2023, being named as a replacement player for the 2024 Bunnings NPC. He spent the 2025 pre-season in the extended playing squad for the Chiefs. He was called into the Highlanders squad for Round 9 of the 2025 Super Rugby Pacific season, making his debut against the Drua.
