= Waisake Salabiau =

Fijian rugby union player

- Born: 20 July 2004 (age 22) Bau, Fiji
- Height: 179 cm (5 ft 10 in)
- Weight: 93 kg (205 lb; 14 st 9 lb)
- School: Rotorua Boys' High School

Rugby union career
- Position: Wing
- Current team: Hurricanes / Waikato
Senior career
Years	Team	Apps	(Points)
2024–	Waikato	16	(40)
2027–	Hurricanes	0	(0)
- Correct as of 8 November 2026
International career
Years	Team	Apps	(Points)
2024	Fiji U20	4	(5)
- Correct as of 8 November 2026

Waisake Salabiau (born 20 July 2004) is a Fijian rugby union player, who plays for the Hurricanes. His preferred position is wing.

== Early career ==
Salabiau is from Kiuva on the island of Bau in Fiji and originally attended Marist Brothers Primary School in Suva, before moving to New Zealand to finish his schooling at Rotorua Boys' High School. While at school, Salabiau was named in the New Zealand Schools Rugby League side, before committing to rugby union. After leaving school, he joined up with the Chiefs academy, representing their U20 side in 2024. In 2024, Salabiau represented the Fiji U20 side. In 2026, he was named in the New Zealand Rugby Sevens development squad.

== Professional career ==
Salabiau has represented Waikato in the National Provincial Championship since 2024, being named in their squad for the 2026 Hilux NPC competition. In October 2026, he was named in the Hurricanes wider training group for the 2027 Super Rugby Pacific season.
