= Sam Tuitupou =

NZ rugby union player (born 1982)

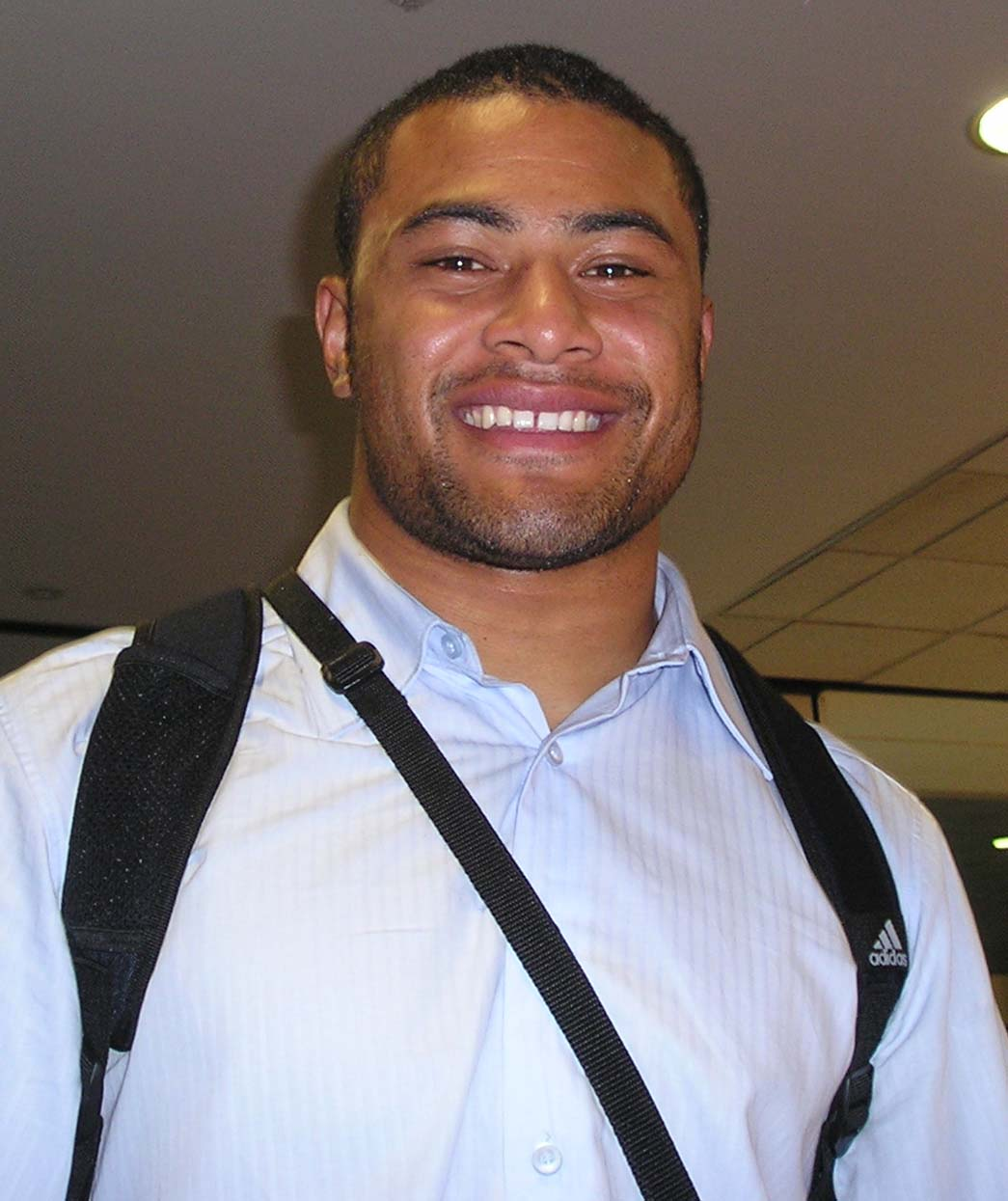
- Tuitupou, September 2008
- Full name: Samual Tuitupou
- Born: 1 February 1982 (age 44) Auckland, New Zealand
- Height: 176 cm (5 ft 9 in)
- Weight: 93 kg (205 lb; 14 st 9 lb)
- School: Kelston Boys' High School
- Notable relative: Sam Tuitupou (son)

Rugby union career
- Position(s): Centre, Wing
Senior career
| Years | Team | Apps | (Points) |
| 2002–2007 | Auckland | 51 | (70) |
| 2003–2007 | Blues | 38 | (40) |
| 2006 | Chiefs | 13 | (20) |
| 2007–2010 | Worcester Warriors | 54 | (70) |
| 2010–2011 | Munster | 19 | (10) |
| 2011–2017 | Sale Sharks | 111 | (60) |
| 2017–2019 | Coventry | 12 | (15) |
- Correct as of 27 May 2020
International career
| Years | Team | Apps | (Points) |
| 2001–2003 | New Zealand U21 | 12 | (17) |
| 2004–2006 | New Zealand | 9 | (5) |
| 2007 | Junior All Blacks | 3 | (0) |
- Correct as of 27 May 2020

Sam Tuitupou (born 1 February 1982) is a New Zealand international rugby union player who plays in England. His position is Inside Centre.

Tuitupou won world titles as captain for New Zealand at under-19 and under-21 level, during his junior career. In his senior career he achieved two Air New Zealand Cup titles, with Auckland and in the Super 14 championship with the Blues. Tuitupou also won acclaim on the international stage with his first All Blacks call-up for the clash with England at Dunedin in 2004. He played for the All Blacks between 2004 and 2006, earning nine caps.

In 2007 he signed a contract with Worcester Warriors, and left New Zealand rugby to join his new team after the completion of the 2007 Air New Zealand Cup. His contract with Worcester kept him at Sixways until June 2010. Tuitopou moved to Munster for the 2010–11 season, replacing Jean de Villiers as Munster's inside centre. Shortly after gaining his first team place he was banned for three weeks after a spear tackle on Paul Hodgson during Munster's Heineken Cup pool game against London Irish. In his short time at Munster, he became a fan favourite, being awarded the nickname "Hacksaw Sam" by the Munster supporters. On 5 April 2011, Munster rugby announced that he would be leaving Munster at the end of the current season. On 11 April 2011, Sale Sharks announced that Tuitupou had signed for two-years from the 2011–12 English Premiership season. On 25 April 2017, Coventry RFC announced that Tuitupou had signed for two-years from the 2017–18 English National League 1 season.

In July 2019 Tuitupou became an official RFU registered Agent and together with his wife Liz started ProFifteen Player Management

In November 2020 Tuitupou, alongside Samoan International Dan Leo, created a rugby podcast named The Red Card Club.

== Boxing ==
In 2023, Isaac Peach trained Tuitupou out of Peach Boxing for a celebrity corporate charity boxing fight against Roy Asotasi at 2023 Fight for life. Tuitupou won the fight by devastating knockout in ten seconds within the first round.
