= Sam Nemec-Vial =

New Zealand rugby union player

- Full name: Samuel Nemec-Vial
- Born: 18 March 2004 (age 22) Invercargill, New Zealand
- Height: 186 cm (6 ft 1 in)
- Weight: 94 kg (207 lb; 14 st 11 lb)
- School: King's High School, Dunedin

Rugby union career
- Position: Wing / Fullback
- Current team: Highlanders / Otago
Senior career
| Years | Team | Apps | (Points) |
| 2025– | Otago | 23 | (55) |
| 2027– | Highlanders | 0 | (0) |
- Correct as of 8 November 2026

Sam Nemec-Vial (born 18 March 2004) is a New Zealand rugby union player, who plays for the Highlanders. His preferred position is wing or fullback.

== Early career ==
Nemec-Vial was born in Invercargill and attended King's High School, Dunedin. Following school, he originally played club rugby for Zingari Richmond before transferring to Green Island. His performances at club level earned him selection for the Highlanders U20 side in 2024, before earning selection for the New Zealand U21 Barbarians side in 2025.

== Professional career ==
Nemec-Vial has represented Otago in the National Provincial Championship since 2025, being named in their squad for the 2026 Hilux NPC competition. In October 2026, he was named in the Highlanders wider training group for the 2027 Super Rugby Pacific season.
