= Nathan Stephens (rugby union) =

Fijian rugby union player

- Full name: Nathan Jeremiah Stephens
- Born: Fiji
- School: Hamilton Boys' High School

Rugby union career
- Position: Wing
- Current team: Chiefs / Waikato
Senior career
Years	Team	Apps	(Points)
2026–	Waikato	9	(10)
2027–	Chiefs	0	(0)
- Correct as of 10 November 2026

Nathan Stephens is a Fijian rugby union player, who plays for the Chiefs. His preferred position is wing.

== Early career ==
Stephens was born in Fiji, but moved to New Zealand for his schooling, attending Hamilton Boys' High School, having previously been schooled at Queen Victoria School in Fiji. His performances earned him selection for the New Zealand U18 Barbarians side in 2025, while also earning a place in the Chiefs academy, representing their U18 side in 2025. He plays his club rugby for Hautupu Sports, and was named a player to watch ahead of the 2026 Hilux NPC competition.

== Professional career ==
Stephens has represented Waikato in the National Provincial Championship since 2026, being named as an additional player in their squad for the 2026 Hilux NPC competition. In October 2026, he was named in the Chiefs wider training group for the 2027 Super Rugby Pacific season.
