= Kieran McClea =

New Zealand rugby union player

- Born: 1 July 1998 (age 28) Ashburton, New Zealand
- Height: 173 cm (5 ft 8 in)
- Weight: 82 kg (181 lb; 12 st 13 lb)
- School: Waitaki Boys' High School

Rugby union career
- Position: Halfback
- Current team: Highlanders / Otago
Senior career
Years	Team	Apps	(Points)
2022–2023, 2026–	Otago	19	(35)
2023	New England Free Jacks	6	(15)
2024	Utah Warriors	16	(25)
2027–	Highlanders	0	(0)
- Correct as of 8 November 2026

Kieran McClea (born 1 July 1998) is a New Zealand rugby union player, who plays for the Highlanders. His preferred position is halfback.

== Early career ==
McClea was born in Ashburton and attended Waitaki Boys' High School. After leaving school, he played rugby in North Otago and played in the Dunedin club rugby system for University of Otago. After returning from America, McClea also represented Mid Canterbury.

== Professional career ==
McClea has represented Otago in the National Provincial Championship since 2026, being named in their squad for the 2026 Hilux NPC competition, and previously represented the side in the 2022 Bunnings NPC and 2023 Bunnings NPC. In 2023, he moved overseas, joining New England Free Jacks for the 2023 Major League Rugby season. He remained in America for the 2024 Major League Rugby season, joining the Utah Warriors. In October 2026, he was named in the Highlanders wider training group for the 2027 Super Rugby Pacific season.
