= Daniel Sinkinson =

New Zealand rugby union player

- Born: 8 February 2001 (age 25)
- Height: 185 cm (6 ft 1 in)
- Weight: 92 kg (203 lb; 14 st 7 lb)
- School: Hamilton Boys' High School

Rugby union career
- Position: Wing
- Current team: Waikato, Hurricanes
Senior career
Years	Team	Apps	(Points)
2021–	Waikato	22	(57)
2023–	Hurricanes	4	(0)
- Correct as of 22 March 2024

Daniel Sinkinson is a New Zealand rugby union player who plays for the Hurricanes in Super Rugby. He plays on the wing. Sinkinson was named in the Hurricanes squad for the 2023 Super Rugby Pacific season. He was also a member of the Waikato 2022 Bunnings NPC squad.

Sinkinson had a breakout season for Waikato in the 2022 Bunnings NPC, including a hat-trick of tries against Southland.
