= Sam Tuitupou (rugby union, born 2005) =

New Zealand rugby union player

- Full name: Sam Tuitupou Ah-Hing
- Born: 24 February 2005 (age 21) Auckland, New Zealand
- School: Kelston Boys' High School
- Notable relative: Sam Tuitupou (father)

Rugby union career
- Position: Flanker / Number 8
Senior career
Years	Team	Apps	(Points)
2026	Moana Pasifika	1	(0)
- Correct as of 20 February 2026

Sam Tuitupou (born 24 February 2005) is a New Zealand rugby union player, who played for Moana Pasifika in Super Rugby. His preferred position is flanker or number 8.

== Early career ==
Tuitupou is from Auckland and attended Kelston Boys' High School where he played rugby and captained their first XV. After leaving school he joined up with the Blues academy, representing their U18 side in 2023, and the U20 side in 2025. In 2025, he was also a member of the North Harbour development side. He is the son of former All Black Sam Tuitupou and has Tongan heritage through his father and Samoan through his mother.

== Professional career ==
Tuitupou trained with Moana Pasifika in pre-season ahead of the 2026 Super Rugby Pacific season, playing in the pre-season trial against the Highlanders. He was a late call-up to the side for Round 2 of the season, coming on as a replacement against the Hurricanes.
