= Sam Clarke (rugby union) =

New Zealand rugby union player (born 1999)

- Born: 23 July 1999 (age 27) Chatham Island, New Zealand
- Height: 183 cm (6 ft 0 in)
- School: St Patrick's College, Silverstream
- Notable relative(s): Tjay Clarke (brother); Chance Peni (cousin)

Rugby union career
- Position: Fly half / Fullback
- Current team: Taranaki
Senior career
Years	Team	Apps	(Points)
2022–	Manawatu		
2023-2025	Wellington		
2025–	Taranaki		
International career
Years	Team	Apps	(Points)
2025–	New Zealand 7s		

Sam Clarke (born 23 July 1999) is a New Zealand rugby union footballer who plays for Taranaki. He made his debut representing the New Zealand national rugby sevens team in 2025.

== Early life ==
A promising age-group rugby union player from Chatham Island, he moved to Perth when he was 10 years-old and played rugby league in the Western Australia representative teams as a teenager. He then moved to Endeavour Sports High School in Sydney. In 2018 while attending St Patrick's College, Silverstream, Clarke played for the first-XV rugby union team that won the Wellington premiership with 16 wins out of 18 games, and where Peter Lakai was a teammate.

== Club career ==
In 2023, while playing for Paremata-Plimmerton, Clarke won the Billy Wallace Best & Fairest Award as the best player in Wellington club rugby, becoming the first winner from the club. Clarke played for Manawatu in the National Provincial Championship, before going on to play for Wellington, winning the NPC in 2024, and in 2025 played for Taranaki Rugby Football Union as well as playing for the Power at the Ignite Sevens that year. In February 2026, playing for his Wellington club, Paremata-Plimmerton, he won the Middlesex County Wavell National Club Sevens Wakefield Cup.

In 2026, Clarke began playing at fly-half for Taranaki after Josh Jacomb was selected for the All Blacks tour of South Africa, Clarke's first professional matches in the position.

== International career ==
Clarke became the first All Black from the Chatham Islands in more than a century after Robert Mathieson in 1922. He made a debut for the New Zealand national rugby sevens team at the 2025 South Africa Sevens, part of the 2025-26 SVNS series in December 2025, scoring a try in a 27–12 victory against Great Britain.

== Personal life ==
From Chatham Islands, his younger brother Tjay Clarke made his Super Rugby debut in 2025. Tjay suffered concussion in a match in 2023 following an accidental collision with Sam while playing for Christchurch. They are cousins of fellow professional rugby union player Chance Peni, who also grew up on Chatham Island.
