= Ben Ake =

New Zealand rugby union player

- Full name: Ben J Ake
- Born: 24 February 2003 (age 23) New Zealand
- Height: 191 cm (6 ft 3 in)
- Weight: 104 kg (229 lb; 16 st 5 lb)
- School: Saint Kentigern College

Rugby union career
- Position: Prop
- Current team: Blues, Auckland
Senior career
Years	Team	Apps	(Points)
2023–	Auckland	7	(0)
2025–	Blues	0	(0)
- Correct as of 9 December 2024
International career
Years	Team	Apps	(Points)
2023	New Zealand U20	4	(0)
- Correct as of 9 December 2024

Ben Ake (born 24 February 2003) is a New Zealand rugby union player, who plays for the Blues and Auckland. His preferred position is prop.

== Early career ==
Ake attended Saint Kentigern College, and represented New Zealand U20 in 2023. He came through the Auckland academy and played his club rugby for Marist.

== Professional career ==
Ake has represented Auckland in the National Provincial Championship since 2023, being named in their full squad for the 2024 Bunnings NPC. He was named in the Blues squad for the 2025 Super Rugby Pacific season in November 2024.
