= Taha Kemara =

New Zealand rugby union player

- Born: 17 April 2003 (age 23) New Zealand
- Height: 179 cm (5 ft 10 in)
- Weight: 88 kg (194 lb)
- School: Hamilton Boys' High School

Rugby union career
- Position: Fly-half
- Current team: Crusaders / Waikato
Senior career
Years	Team	Apps	(Points)
2022–	Waikato	21	(107)
2023–2026, 2028–	Crusaders	29	(124)
2027	Chiefs	0	(0)
- Correct as of 3 September 2026
International career
Years	Team	Apps	(Points)
2022–2023	New Zealand U20	5	(43)
2024	Maori All Blacks	1	(0)
- Correct as of 6 July 2024

Taha Kemara is a New Zealand rugby union player who plays for the Crusaders in Super Rugby and for Waikato in the Bunnings NPC. His playing position is fly-half. He was named in the Crusaders squad for the 2023 Super Rugby Pacific season. He was named in the Waikato 2022 Bunnings NPC squad.

He competed for New Zealand Touch in the 2020 B18 Youth Trans Tasman final against Australia, playing alongside Noah Hotham.

Having begun playing rugby at Ōpōtiki Sports Club JAB, he moved to Te Awamutu Sports Rugby Club. Kemara attended Hamilton Boys' High School, where he captained them to their first High School title since 2014, playing alongside his Crusaders teammate Noah Hotham.

== Personal life ==
Kemara is a New Zealander of Māori descent (Te Whakatōhea and Te Whānau a Apanui descent).
