= Divad Palu =

Australian rugby union player (born 2004)

- Born: 17 January 2004 (age 22) Wellington, New Zealand
- Height: 188 cm (6 ft 2 in)
- School: St Kevin's College, Melbourne

Rugby union career
- Position: Centre / Wing
- Current team: Force
Senior career
| Years | Team | Apps | (Points) |
| 2024 | Rebels | 0 | (0) |
| 2025– | Force | 2 | (0) |
- Correct as of 21 May 2025
International career
| Years | Team | Apps | (Points) |
| 2024 | Australia U20 | 2 | (0) |
- Correct as of 16 February 2025

Divad Palu (born 17 January 2004) is a professional Australian rugby union player, who plays for the Force. His preferred position is centre or wing.

== Early career ==
Palu was born in Auckland, New Zealand but grew up in Melbourne attending St Kevin's College, Melbourne. He was a member of the Melbourne Rebels academy have come through the Victoria rugby system and was named in the Australia U20 squad for 2024.

== Professional career ==
Palu was named in the Rebels squad for the 2024 Super Rugby Pacific season, however did not make an appearance. Following the Rebels collapse, Palu moved to the Force ahead of the 2025 Super Rugby Pacific season, making his debut in Round 1 of the season against Moana Pasifika.
