= Nathaniel Pole =

New Zealand rugby union player

- Born: 21 October 2004 (age 22) New Zealand
- School: Sacred Heart College, Auckland

Rugby union career
- Position: Hooker
- Current team: Auckland, Canon Eagles
Senior career
Years	Team	Apps	(Points)
2025	Blues	3	(0)
2025–	Auckland	10	(10)
2026–	Canon Eagles		
- Correct as of 16 February 2025

Nathaniel Pole (born 21 October 2004) is a New Zealand rugby union player, who plays for Blues. His preferred position is hooker.

== Early career ==
Pole attended Sacred Heart College, Auckland having come through the Auckland and Blue academy, being named as a reserve for the New Zealand U20 squad in 2024. He has represented the Blues at U20 level since 2023.

== Professional career ==
Pole was called into the Blues squad ahead of Round 1 of the 2025 Super Rugby Pacific season. He would make his debut in the same round, coming on as a replacement against the Chiefs.
