= Payton Spencer =

New Zealand rugby union player

- Born: 23 April 2004 (age 22)
- Height: 1.91 m (6 ft 3 in)
- Weight: 90 kg (198 lb; 14 st 2 lb)
- School: Hamilton Boys' High School
- Notable relative: Carlos Spencer (father)

Rugby union career
- Position: Full back
- Current team: Blues
Senior career
Years	Team	Apps	(Points)
2022–	Auckland		
2026–	Blues	1	
- Correct as of 8 April 2024
National sevens team
Years	Team		Comps
2023–	New Zealand		

Payton Spencer (born 23 April 2004) is a New Zealand professional rugby union player who plays as a full back. He plays for Auckland and the New Zealand national sevens team.

== Early and personal life ==
He is the son of Jodene and New Zealand rugby international Carlos Spencer. He lived in England between 2005 and 2010 when his dad was playing for Northampton Saints and Gloucester Rugby.

He later attended Hamilton Boys' High School. Playing for their First XV, he helped them to the National First XV Championship and then the World Schools Championship in Thailand in December 2022, beating South African school Grey's College in the final.

== Career ==
Also a keen cricketer in his youth, he played as an all-rounder in his high school's first XI cricket team and represented the Black Caps as a substitute fielder in 2020. He also excelled at rugby union as a teenager, playing as a full back. In November 2022, he signed a professional contract with Super Rugby side Blues.

In January 2023, he agreed a two-year contract with the New Zealand national rugby sevens team side. He made his debut on 27 January 2023 and scored two tries against Uruguay. He played in the Sevens World Series as New Zealand won the Sydney Sevens, beating South Africa 38–0 in the final. Spencer made his debut for the Blues in March 2026 from the bench against the Waratahs which they won.
