= Alex Harford =

New Zealand rugby union player

- Born: 16 June 1999 (age 27) Christchurch, New Zealand
- Height: 1.82 m (6 ft 0 in)
- Weight: 91 kg (201 lb; 14 st 5 lb)
- School: Christchurch Boys' High School

Rugby union career
- Position: Fly-half
- Current team: Auckland, Western Force
Senior career
Years	Team	Apps	(Points)
2021–2023	Canterbury	13	(68)
2024–	Auckland	5	(15)
2025–	Western Force	2	(2)
- Correct as of 4 February 2026

Alex Harford (born 16 June 1999) is a New Zealand professional rugby union player who plays as a fly-half for Super Rugby club Western Force.

== Early life ==
Harford attended Christchurch Boys' High School, and plays his club rugby for High School Old Boys RFC. Harford is Australian qualified through his grandparents and has family from Perth.

== Club career ==
Harford has represented Auckland in the National Provincial Championship since 2024, being named in their squad for the 2024 Bunnings NPC. He had previously played for Canterbury between 2021 and 2023. He was called into the Force squad for Round 14 of the 2025 Super Rugby Pacific season, making his debut against the Drua.
