= Austin Anderson =

New Zealand rugby union player

- Born: November 18, 2003 (age 22) Perth, Australia
- Height: 186 cm (6 ft 1 in)
- Weight: 94 kg (207 lb)

Rugby union career
- Position(s): Fly-Half, Centre
- Current team: Brumbies, Waikato
Senior career
| Years | Team | Apps | (Points) |
| 2023– | Waikato | 17 | (15) |
| 2024– | Brumbies | 2 | |
- Correct as of 14 June 2025

Austin Anderson is a New Zealand rugby union player, who plays for the Brumbies and Waikato. His preferred position is centre.

== Early career ==
Anderson plays his club rugby for Te Awamutu Sports. Australian qualified, he moved to Australia during the 2023 season and represented Canberra Wests. He was named in the Junior Wallabies wider training squad in 2023.

== Professional career ==
Anderson has represented Waikato in the National Provincial Championship since 2023, being named as a replacement player for the 2023 Bunnings NPC. He was named in the Brumbies squad for the 2024 Super Rugby Pacific season.
