= Sam Hainsworth-Fa'aofo =

New Zealand rugby union player

- Born: 20 April 2003 (age 23) New Zealand
- Height: 184 cm (6 ft 0 in)
- Weight: 100 kg (220 lb; 15 st 10 lb)
- School: Auckland Grammar School

Rugby union career
- Position: Flanker / Number 8
- Current team: Crusaders, Auckland
Senior career
Years	Team	Apps	(Points)
2022–	Auckland	10	(15)
2026–	Crusaders		
- Correct as of 16 November 2025
International career
Years	Team	Apps	(Points)
2023	New Zealand U20	3	(10)
- Correct as of 16 November 2025

Sam Hainsworth-Fa'aofo (born 20 April 2003) is a New Zealand rugby union player, who plays for the Crusaders and Auckland. His preferred position is flanker or number 8.

== Early career ==
Hainsworth-Fa'aofo attended Auckland Grammar School where he played for the first XV, while also playing club rugby for Grammar TEC, earning selection for the New Zealand Schools Barbarians team in 2021. After leaving school he joined up with the Auckland academy, representing their U19 side in 2022, while also captaining the New Zealand U19 side in the same year. He was subsequently named in the Blues academy, representing their U20 side in 2023, while in the same year also represented the New Zealand U20 side.

== Professional career ==
Hainsworth-Fa'aofo has represented Auckland in the National Provincial Championship since 2022, being named in the squad for the 2025 Bunnings NPC. He was named in the Crusaders wider training group for the 2026 Super Rugby Pacific season.
