= Stephen Perofeta =

New Zealand rugby union player

- Born: 12 March 1997 (age 29) Whanganui, New Zealand
- Height: 1.81 m (5 ft 11 in)
- Weight: 85 kg (187 lb; 13 st 5 lb)
- School: Whanganui Collegiate School

Rugby union career
- Position(s): First five-eighth, Fullback
- Current team: Taranaki, Canon Eagles
Senior career
Years	Team	Apps	(Points)
2015	Whanganui	7	(47)
2016–2025	Taranaki	65	(342)
2017–2026	Blues	78	(397)
2026	Auckland	5	(48)
2026–	Canon Eagles		
- Correct as of 13 May 2026
International career
Years	Team	Apps	(Points)
2015	Heartland XV	3	(58)
2016–2017	New Zealand U20	8	(18)
2022–	New Zealand	6	(0)
- Correct as of 13 May 2026

Stephen Perofeta (born 12 March 1997) is a New Zealand rugby union player who plays as a First five‐eighth or Fullback for the Blues in Super Rugby and Taranaki in the Bunnings NPC.

== Club career ==
Coming back from injury, Perofeta made his debut as a substitute player against the Queensland Reds in Apia, a match the Blues won 24–19. He scored a try and kicked two conversions, for a total of nine points in his first game. A week later, Perofeta started at first five as the Blues defeated the touring British and Irish Lions at Eden Park 22–16. Perofeta played a key role in the victory, with his beautiful cut-out pass setting up Rieko Ioane for the game's opening try, then his unsuccessful penalty goal attempt lead to a Sonny Bill Williams try (which Perofeta duly converted) to give the Blues the halftime lead.

== International career ==
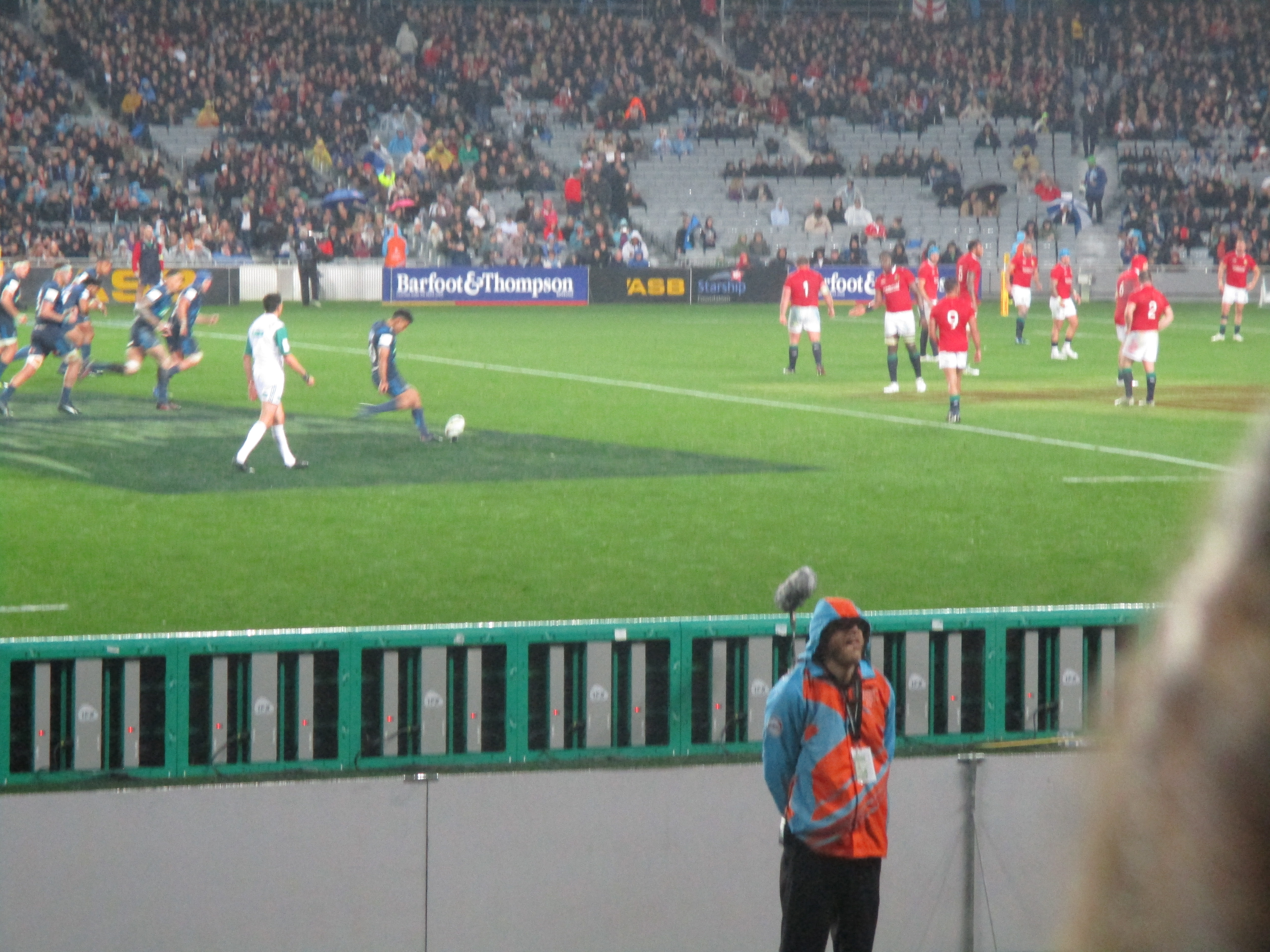
Perofeta attempting a penalty goal against the British and Irish Lions at Eden Park

In June 2017, Perofeta was called in as an emergency replacement for the New Zealand Under 20s rugby side at the World Rugby Under 20s World Championship. He started the final, and kicked seven conversions as New Zealand convincingly beat England 64–17 to win the tournament.

Perofeta made his international debut for the All Blacks on 27 August 2022 against Argentina in Christchurch in the final minute of the game.
