= Xavier Treacy =

New Zealand rugby union player

- Born: 21 June 2005 (age 21) Cincinnati, Ohio, United States
- Height: 196 cm (6 ft 5 in)
- Weight: 108 kg (238 lb; 17 st 0 lb)
- School: St Kevin's College, Melbourne
- University: University of Canterbury

Rugby union career
- Position: Lock / Flanker
- Current team: Crusaders, Canterbury
Senior career
Years	Team	Apps	(Points)
2025–	Canterbury	9	(15)
2026–	Crusaders		
- Correct as of 16 November 2025
International career
Years	Team	Apps	(Points)
2025	New Zealand U20	8	(10)
- Correct as of 5 October 2026

Xavier Treacy (born 21 June 2006) is a New Zealand rugby union player, who plays for the Crusaders and Canterbury. His preferred position is lock or flanker.

== Early career ==
Born in the United States, Treacy is of New Zealand descent. He grew up in Australia, attending St Kevin's College, Melbourne. Formally a member of the Melbourne Rebels academy, he moved to Christchurch for tertiary study, joining up with the Crusaders Academy, representing their U20 side in 2025. In the same year, he represented the New Zealand U20 side.

== Professional career ==
Treacy has represented Canterbury in the National Provincial Championship since 2025, being called into the squad as a replacement player for the 2025 Bunnings NPC. He was named in the Crusaders wider training group for the 2026 Super Rugby Pacific season.
