= Esile Fono =

New Zealand rugby union player

- Born: 5 August 2001 (age 25) New Zealand
- Height: 192 cm (6 ft 4 in)
- Weight: 122 kg (269 lb; 19 st 3 lb)
- School: Whangarei Boys' High School

Rugby union career
- Position: Prop
- Current team: Blues, Northland
Senior career
Years	Team	Apps	(Points)
2022–	Northland	20	(0)
2026–	Blues		
- Correct as of 10 November 2025

Esile Fono (born 5 August 2001) is a New Zealand rugby union player, who plays for the Blues and Northland. His preferred position is prop.

== Early career ==
Fono attended Whangarei Boys' High School where he played rugby for the first XV. After leaving school, he joined up with the Blues academy being named in the Blues U20 side in 2021. He plays his club rugby for Hora Hora in the Northland region.

== Professional career ==
Fono has represented Northland in the National Provincial Championship since 2022, being named in the squad for the 2025 Bunnings NPC. He was named in the Blues wider training group for the 2026 Super Rugby Pacific season.
