= Lewis Ponini =

New Zealand rugby union player

- Born: 7 December 1999 (age 26) Rarotonga
- Height: 178 cm (5 ft 10 in)
- Weight: 130 kg (287 lb)
- School: Rangiora High School
- Notable relative: Ridge Ponini

Rugby union career
- Position: Prop
- Current team: Eastern Suburbs Rugby
Senior career
| Years | Team | Apps | (Points) |
| 2020 | Canterbury | 2 | (0) |
| 2024 | Waratahs | 7 | (0) |
| 2025– | Crusaders | 1 | (0) |
- Correct as of 21 May 2025

Lewis Ponini (born 7 December 1999) is a New Zealand rugby union player, who plays for the Crusaders in Super Rugby. He has also played for Canterbury in the Bunnings NPC. His preferred position is prop.

== Early career ==
Ponini attended Rangiora High School. He moved to Australia in 2021, first representing Eastwood, before transferring to Eastern Suburbs in 2023.

== Professional career ==
Ponini represented Canterbury in the 2020 Mitre 10 Cup having been called into the squad as an injury replacement. He was initially called into the Waratahs B team as an injury replacement during the 2024 Super Rugby Pacific pre-season, and went on to become a regular in Waratahs Super Rugby team during the 2024 Super Rugby Pacific season, making his debut for the side in Round 8 as a replacement against the Crusaders, and going on to play a total of 7 matches for the NSW side. Ponini was called into the Crusaders squad as injury cover ahead of the 2025 Super Rugby Pacific season. He made his debut in Round 16 in 2025 against the Brumbies in Canberra. He became Crusader #300. Ponini is currently contracted with Canterbury for the Bunnings NPC Competition, and was part of the winning squad for the 2025 season, following a season victory with the Crusaders in the 2025 Super Rugby Pacific competition.
