= Tamiro Armstrong =

New Zealand rugby union player

- Born: 1 March 2003 (age 23) New Zealand
- Height: 185 cm (6 ft 1 in)
- Weight: 90 kg (198 lb; 14 st 2 lb)
- School: Rotorua Boys' High School

Rugby union career
- Position: Midfielder / Wing
- Current team: Chiefs, Bay of Plenty
Senior career
Years	Team	Apps	(Points)
2023–	Bay of Plenty	13	(5)
2026–	Chiefs		
- Correct as of 12 November 2025

Tamiro Armstrong (born 1 March 2003) is a New Zealand rugby union player, who plays for the Chiefs and Bay of Plenty. His preferred position is midfield or wing.

== Early career ==
Armstrong originally attended Auckland Grammar School where he participated in rugby union, track & field and rugby league. He moved to Rotorua Boys' High School for the end of his education, focusing mainly on rugby union as a sport while studying there, earning selection for the New Zealand Schools Barbarians side in 2021. Having left school he joined up with the Chiefs academy, representing their U18s in 2021. He plays his club rugby for Tauranga Sports in the Bay of Plenty region.

== Professional career ==
Armstrong has represented Bay of Plenty in the National Provincial Championship since 2023, being named in the squad for the 2025 Bunnings NPC. He was named in the Chiefs wider training group for the 2026 Super Rugby Pacific season.
