= Tony Tafa =

New Zealand rugby union player

- Born: 25 June 2003 (age 23) Apia, Samoa
- Height: 190 cm (6 ft 3 in)
- Weight: 124 kg (273 lb; 19 st 7 lb)
- School: Kelston Boys' High School

Rugby union career
- Position: Prop
- Current team: Hurricanes, North Harbour
Senior career
Years	Team	Apps	(Points)
2025–	North Harbour	9	(0)
2026–	Hurricanes		
- Correct as of 18 November 2025

Tony Tafa (born 25 June 2003) is a New Zealand rugby union player, who plays for the Hurricanes and North Harbour. His preferred position is prop.

== Early career ==
Tafa was born in Apia, Samoa, but moved to New Zealand as a child, where he attended Kelston Boys' High School playing rugby for the first XV and being named in the New Zealand Schools Barbarians side in 2020. While at school he also played rugby league for the New Zealand Warriors junior sides. After leaving school, he joined up with the Blues academy, representing their U18 side in 2021, and the U20 side in 2023. He plays his club rugby for Massey in the North Harbour region.

== Professional career ==
Tafa has represented North Harbour in the National Provincial Championship since 2025, being named in the squad for the 2025 Bunnings NPC. He was named in the Hurricanes wider training group for the 2026 Super Rugby Pacific season.
