= George Worboys =

English rugby union player

- Born: 21 March 2001 (age 25) Warwick, England
- Height: 1.78 m (5 ft 10 in)
- Weight: 88 kg (13 st 12 lb; 194 lb)
- School: Beechen Cliff School
- University: University of Bath

Rugby union career
- Position(s): Fly-half, fullback
Youth career
- Clifton Rugby
- Chippenham RFC
Senior career
Years	Team	Apps	(Points)
2024-	Ealing Trailfinders		
2021 - 2023	Bath		
2022	→ Coventry (loan)		
International career
Years	Team	Apps	(Points)
2019	England U18		

George Worboys (born 21 March 2001) is an English rugby union player who plays for Ealing Trailfinders as a fly-half or fullback.

== Early life ==
Worboys attended Beechen Cliff School, Bath where he played rugby alongside Tom de Glanville. He played for Clifton Rugby, and Chippenham from under-14s where he played alongside Max Ojomoh. He also attended the University of Bath.

== Career ==
Worboys signed a professional contract with Bath in June 2019. By the end of the year he was playing for Bath in the Premiership Rugby Shield.

Worboys joined RFU Championship side Coventry R.F.C. on loan in 2022. Worboys made his Bath debut in the Premiership Rugby league against Northampton Saints on 22 October 2022, playing at fly-half. Bath won 27-14 and after six straight defeats was Bath’s first win of the 2022-23 Premiership Rugby season. Worboys successfully kicked twelve points.

== Personal life ==
The son of Nick and Amelia Worboys, in 2014 George’s younger brother Thomas ‘Toti’ Worboys died of leukimia aged eleven years-old, just the day after receiving the leukaemia diagnosis. George and his family have devoted time since to raise considerable money for the charities Children’s Cancer and Leukaemia Group. George has siblings called Barney, Eve and Hugh Thomas. When he scores Worboys makes a ‘T’ gesture with his arms in memory of his brother.

== International career ==
In 2019 Worboys was called up to the England national under-18 rugby union team.
