= JJ Pokai =

New Zealand rugby union player

- Full name: Josiah Pokai
- Born: 30 April 2002 (age 24) New Zealand
- Height: 174 cm (5 ft 9 in)
- Weight: 115 kg (254 lb; 18 st 2 lb)
- School: New Plymouth Boys' High School

Rugby union career
- Position: Hooker
- Current team: Chiefs, Taranaki
Senior career
| Years | Team | Apps | (Points) |
| 2024– | Taranaki | 16 | (0) |
| 2026– | Chiefs | | |
- Correct as of 11 November 2025

JJ Pokai (born 30 April 2002) is a New Zealand rugby union player, who plays for the Chiefs and Taranaki. His preferred position is hooker.

== Early career ==
Pokai attended New Plymouth Boys' High School where he played rugby for the first XV. After leaving school he joined up with the Taranaki academy, joining in 2020. He earned selection for the Chiefs U20 side in 2021, having earned selection for the Chiefs U18 side in 2019. He plays his club rugby for the New Plymouth Old Boys in the Taranaki region.

== Professional career ==
Pokai has represented Taranaki in the National Provincial Championship since 2024, being named in the squad for the 2025 Bunnings NPC. He was named in the Chiefs wider training group for the 2026 Super Rugby Pacific season.
