= Waikato (National Provincial Championship) =

New Zealand rugby union team, based in Hamilton

- WRU official emblem
- Union: Waikato Rugby Union
- Nickname: Mooloos
- Founded: 1921; 105 years ago
- Location: Whitiora, Hamilton, New Zealand
- Ground: FMG Stadium Waikato (Capacity: 25,000)
- CEO: Amy Marfell
- Coach: Leon Holden
- Captain: Mitch Jacobson
- Most appearances: Ian Foster and Graham Purvis (148)
- Top scorer: Matthew Cooper (1,604)
- Most tries: Bruce Smith (70)
- League: National Provincial Championship
- 2025: 7th Quarter-finals
Team kit

Official website
- www.mooloo.co.nz

Waikato (often known as the Waikato Mooloos) are a New Zealand professional rugby union team based in Hamilton, New Zealand. The union was originally established in 1921, with the National Provincial Championship established in 1976. They now play in the reformed National Provincial Championship competition. They play their home games at FMG Stadium Waikato in Hamilton in the Waikato region. The team is affiliated with the Chiefs Super Rugby franchise. Their home playing colours are red, yellow and black.

== Current squad ==
The Waikato Mooloos squad for the 2026 Hilux NPC season is:

2026 Waikato squad
**Props**: (New Zealand) George Dyer; (New Zealand) Sefo Kautai; (New Zealand) Will Martin; (New Zealand) **Ollie Norris**; (New Zealand) Taipari Quinn; (New Zealand) Gabe Robinson; (New Zealand) Mason Tupaea; **Hookers**: (Samoa) **Pita Anae-Ah Sue** ^{ST} (Note: Anae Ah-Sue wasn’t named in the original Waikato squad, but was announced in the side for Round 5.); (Samoa) **Manaaki Boyle-Tiatia**; (New Zealand) Sean Ralph; (New Zealand) **Samisoni Taukei'aho**; **Locks**: (Scotland) Hamilton Burr; (New Zealand) Dylan Eti; (New Zealand) Laghlan McWhannell; (New Zealand) James Tucker	**Loose forwards**: (New Zealand) Liam Anderson ^{ST} (Note: Liam Anderson wasn't named in the original Waikato squad, but was announced as a late inclusion in the side for the Quarter-final.); (New Zealand) Jahrome Brown; (New Zealand) Micah Fale; (New Zealand) **Samipeni Finau**; (New Zealand) **Luke Jacobson**; (New Zealand) Mitch Jacobson **(c)**; (New Zealand) Senita Lauaki; (New Zealand) Christian McEwan ^{ST} (Note: McEwan wasn't named in the original Waikato squad, but was named as a late inclusion in the side for Round 2.); (New Zealand) Xavier Saifoloi; (New Zealand) Andrew Smith; (New Zealand) Malachi Wrampling; **Halfbacks (scrum-halves)**: (New Zealand) Rui Farrant; (Japan) **Daiki Nakajima**; (New Zealand) Keaton Neels ^{DEV} (Note: Neels wasn't named in the original Waikato squad, but was announced as a late inclusion in the side for Round 6.); (New Zealand) **Cortez Ratima**; (New Zealand) Xavier Roe; **First five-eighths (fly-halves)**: (New Zealand) Taha Kemara; (Samoa) **D'Angelo Leuila**; (New Zealand) Rangiwai Lunjevich ^{DEV} (Note: Lunjevich wasn't named in the original Waikato squad, but was announced as a late inclusion in the side for Round 6.); (New Zealand) **Damian McKenzie**	**Midfielders (centres)**: (New Zealand) Austin Anderson; (New Zealand) **Anton Lienert-Brown**; (Fiji) Michael Naitokani; (New Zealand) **Quinn Tupaea**; **Outside backs**: (New Zealand) Tepaea Cook-Savage ^{ST} (Note: Cook-Savage wasn't named in the original Waikato squad, but was announced in the side for Round 4.); (New Zealand) David Lewai; (New Zealand) Oli Mathis; (New Zealand) **Josh Moorby**; (New Zealand) Dallas Rata-Makene ^{ST} (Note: Rata-Makene wasn't named in the original Waikato squad, but was announced as a late inclusion in the side for Round 6.); (Fiji) Waisake Salabiau; (New Zealand) Daniel Sinkinson; (Fiji) Nathan Stephens (Note: Stephens wasn't named in the original Waikato squad, but was announced in the side for Round 1.); (New Zealand) Aki Tuivailala
**(c)** denotes the team captain. **Bold** denotes internationally capped players.^{ST} denotes a short-term signing.^{DEV} denotes a development squad member. Source:

== Honours ==
Waikato have been overall Champions on three occasions, winning the titles in 1992, 2006 and 2021. Their full list of honours include:

National Provincial Championship Second Division North Island

- Winners: 1980

National Provincial Championship Second Division

- Winners: 1986

National Provincial Championship First Division

- Winners: 1992

Air New Zealand Cup

- Winners: 2006

Mitre 10 Cup Championship Division

- Winners: 2018

Bunnings NPC Premiership Division

- Winners: 2021

== Current Super Rugby players ==
Players named in the 2025 Waikato Mooloos squad, who also earned contracts or were named in a squad for any side participating in the 2025 Super Rugby Pacific season.

Player	Team
Austin Anderson	Brumbies
Jahrome Brown	Chiefs
Liam Coombes-Fabling	Chiefs
George Dyer	Chiefs
Samipeni Finau	Chiefs
Luke Jacobson	Chiefs
Sefo Kautai	Highlanders
Taha Kemara	Crusaders
Anton Lienert-Brown	Chiefs
Damian McKenzie	Chiefs
Laghlan McWhannell	Blues
Ollie Norris	Chiefs
Cortez Ratima	Chiefs
Xavier Roe	Chiefs
Xavier Saifoloi	Crusaders
Daniel Sinkinson	Hurricanes
Bailyn Sullivan	Hurricanes
Samisoni Taukei'aho	Chiefs
Aki Tuivailala	Crusaders
Mason Tupaea	Blues
Quinn Tupaea	Chiefs
Gideon Wrampling	Chiefs
Malachi Wrampling-Alec	Chiefs
