= 2026 New Zealand rugby union tour of South Africa =

- Tour promotional logo
- Date: 7 August – 12 September 2026
- Coach: Dave Rennie
- Test series winners: South Africa (3–1)
- Top point scorer: Ruben Love (30)
- Top try scorers: Will Jordan (4); Leroy Carter (4); Rieko Ioane (4); Josh Moorby (4)
- Top test point scorer: Cheslin Kolbe (29)
- Top test try scorer: Will Jordan (4)
Summary
P	W	D	L
Total
8	5	0	3
Opponent
P	W	D	L
South Africa
4	1	0	3

Tour chronology
- ← Europe 2006 (Note: Most recent New Zealand rugby union tour.) ← 1996 (Note: Most recent New Zealand rugby union tour of South Africa.)

The 2026 New Zealand rugby union tour of South Africa (Afrikaans: 2026 Nieu-Seelandse rugby-unietoer van Suid-Afrika), promoted as Rugby's Greatest Rivalry (Afrikaans: Rugby se Grootste Wedywering), was an international rugby union tour that took place mostly in South Africa, with one match in the United States, between 07 August and 12 September 2026.

The tour was confirmed in October 2025, and meant a restructuring of the Rugby Championship, the annual Southern Hemisphere men's rugby union competition organised by SANZAAR, which features the national teams of Argentina, Australia, New Zealand and South Africa, which was axed for 2026 and 2030.

Alongside the New Zealand tour was a South Africa women vs. New Zealand women match at FNB Stadium on 5 September, ahead of the third test. It is the first time in the pair's history that the Freedom Cup has been contested over four tests.

== Background and history ==
Since the earliest years of international rugby union, it was customary for the three former British dominions of Australia, New Zealand, and South Africa to undertake reciprocal touring arrangements. Between 1903 and 1995, Australia and New Zealand alone conducted more than forty tours of one another, while South Africa hosted Australia and New Zealand on five and six occasions respectively between 1928 and New Zealand's controversial 1976 tour.

During the mid to late twentieth century, this system of extended, bilateral tours was periodically expanded to include the rugby nations of Europe (Great Britain: England, Scotland, Wales, and Ireland and France). Throughout his period, international rugby was defined by these lengthy tours and persisted until the introduction of the quadrennial Rugby World Cup (RWC) in 1987. However, the sporting boycotts imposed on South Africa in response to apartheid resulted in the Springboks playing very few international fixtures throughout the 1970s and 1980s. Following their readmission to international rugby in the early 1990s, the country hosted and participated in its first Rugby World Cup in 1995 (the third tournament in the competition's history). That same year marked the formal professionalisation of rugby union. In 1995, Australia, New Zealand, and South Africa established a joint union, SANZAR, and established the annual Tri Nations Series (now known as the Rugby Championship), effectively ending the traditional touring practice.

The Daily Maverick reported in February 2024 that "advanced talks" were taking place between the South African Rugby Union (SARU) and New Zealand Rugby (NZR) about a possible return of traditional tours between New Zealand and South Africa, with initial talks having been brokered in August 2022 in Johannesburg. It was reported by The Australian in 2026 that "the vision of the tour started in late 2021, but it was only when NZR and SARU officials met during a two-week tour in 2022 that it gathered pace."

SABC Sport later reported in May 2024 that traditional tours between New Zealand and South Africa were set to resume in 2026 on a four-year reciprocal cycle, with the SARU and NZR believed to have reached an in-principle agreement. It was also reported that the two unions had been in discussions since 2023 regarding the revival of the historic tours, which was confirmed by the SARU president Mark Alexander and NZR chief executive Mark Robinson. According to the report, New Zealand were scheduled to tour South Africa in 2026 for a three-test series, alongside five mid-week matches against the four South African United Rugby Championship (URC) provincial teams (Bulls, Lions, Sharks, Stormers), alongside a fixture against South Africa A. In September 2024, the Daily Maverick reported that "formal agreements" between the SARU and NZR had been made, confirming the return of the traditional tour. It was revealed to be a New Zealand eight-match tour of South Africa, including four test matches, with one set to be played at a neutral venue. The tour itself was officially confirmed in October 2025, and revealed the specific details of fixtures to be played as well as venues.

== Schedule ==
A general tour outline was revealed during news reports throughout 2024. The full tour schedule was revealed on 16 October 2025.

Date	Home team	Score	Away team	Venue	Details
7 August (Friday)	Stormers	21–38	New Zealand	Cape Town Stadium, Cape Town	Match details
11 August (Tuesday)	Sharks	0–54	New Zealand	Kings Park Stadium, Durban	Match details
15 August (Saturday)	Bulls	19–50	New Zealand	Loftus Versfeld Stadium, Pretoria	Match details
22 August (Saturday)	South Africa	16–33	New Zealand	Ellis Park Stadium, Johannesburg	Match details
25 August (Tuesday)	Lions	35–41	New Zealand	Ellis Park Stadium, Johannesburg	Match details
29 August (Saturday)	South Africa	33–26	New Zealand	Cape Town Stadium, Cape Town	Match details
5 September (Saturday)	South Africa	29–24	New Zealand	FNB Stadium, Johannesburg	Match details
12 September (Saturday)	South Africa	43–28	New Zealand	M&T Bank Stadium, Baltimore (United States)	Match details

== Venues ==
Tour venues were first speculated by SABC Sport in May 2024, with a report stating that: "A fourth Test match between the two sides [South Africa, New Zealand] is also set to be hosted at a neutral venue, with the Springboks then touring New Zealand in 2030." All of the matches hosted in South Africa were confirmed on 16 October 2025 after both the South African Rugby Union (SARU) and New Zealand Rugby (NZR) announced the return of the traditional tour. In the announcement the venues were confirmed to be Ellis Park Stadium, FNB Stadium, Cape Town Stadium, Kings Park Stadium, and Loftus Versfeld Stadium. Two of the four tests are to be played in Johannesburg, with one to be played in Cape Town. A fourth test venue was at first not announced, and was reportedly on neutral territory. Speculation by media sources has pointed to Twickenham Stadium in London, and Croke Park in Dublin. In January 2026, the neutral venue was confirmed to be the M&T Bank Stadium in Baltimore, Maryland, United States, home to the Baltimore Ravens of the National Football League. It is the first time the two teams have met each other in the United States.

Johannesburg, Gauteng		Cape Town, Western Cape	Durban, KwaZulu-Natal
Ellis Park Stadium	FNB Stadium	Cape Town Stadium	Kings Park Stadium
Capacity: 62,500	Capacity: 95,000	Capacity: 58,000	Capacity: 46,000
2026 New Zealand rugby union tour of South Africa is located in South Africa			Pretoria, Gauteng
2026 New Zealand rugby union tour of South Africa is located in South Africa			Loftus Versfeld Stadium
2026 New Zealand rugby union tour of South Africa is located in South Africa			Capacity: 51,762

== Squads ==
=== New Zealand ===
On 27 July, New Zealand named a 44-player squad ahead of the Rugby's Greatest Rivalry tour of South Africa.

Coaching team:

- Head coach: (New Zealand) Dave Rennie
- Senior assistant coach: (New Zealand) Neil Barnes
- Forwards coach: (New Zealand) Jason Ryan
- Defence coach: (New Zealand) Tana Umaga
- Attack coach: (Scotland) Mike Blair
- Head of performance: (New Zealand) Phil Healey

Note: Ages and clubs are listed as of the first tour match on 7 August against the Stormers.

- George Bell was initially a part of the squad but suffered a calf strain before the first game against the Stormers, and was therefore ruled out of the tour. Bradley Slater replaced him.
- Billy Proctor was a part of the squad and played against the Stormers, but suffered a shoulder blade fracture during that game and was ruled out of the remainder of the tour. Richie Mo'unga was announced as his replacement.
- Caleb Clarke was a part of the squad and played against the Stormers and the Sharks, but suffered a ruptured shoulder tendon during the Sharks game and was ruled out of the remainder of the tour. He was not replaced.
- Ollie Norris was a part of the squad but suffered a knee injury and was ruled out of the remainder of the tour. He was replaced by Saula Ma'u.
- Cortez Ratima picked up a knee injury during the 3rd game of the tour against the Bulls, however was not returned home. Noah Hotham was brought in as injury cover.
- Ethan de Groot and Josh Lord collided head to head during the first test match against the Springboks, and were subsequently taken off the field. Both players are going through World Rugby's concussion protocols, while Ofa Tu'ungafasi and Jamie Hannah were brought in as injury cover.
- Anton Segner suffered inflammatory arthritis in his ankle before the first test match against the Springboks and was substituted in that game by Simon Parker. He later received surgery and was subsequently ruled out of the remainder of the tour. He was not replaced.

Player	Position	Date of birth (age)	Caps	Franchise/province
Asafo Aumua	Hooker	5 May 1997 (aged 29)	24	(New Zealand) Hurricanes / Wellington
Bradley Slater	Hooker	23 September 1998 (aged 27)	0	(New Zealand) Blues / Taranaki
Samisoni Taukei'aho	Hooker	8 August 1997 (aged 28)	44	(New Zealand) Chiefs / Waikato
Codie Taylor	Hooker	31 March 1991 (aged 35)	111	(New Zealand) Crusaders / Canterbury
George Bower	Prop	30 May 1992 (aged 34)	26	(New Zealand) Crusaders / Otago
Ethan de Groot	Prop	22 July 1998 (aged 28)	44	(New Zealand) Highlanders / Southland
Siale Lauaki	Prop	30 May 2003 (aged 23)	0	(New Zealand) Hurricanes / Wellington
Tyrel Lomax	Prop	16 March 1996 (aged 30)	53	(New Zealand) Hurricanes / Tasman
Saula Ma'u	Prop	29 April 2000 (aged 26)	0	(New Zealand) Highlanders / Otago
Fletcher Newell	Prop	1 February 2000 (aged 26)	39	(New Zealand) Crusaders / Canterbury
Xavier Numia	Prop	29 November 1998 (aged 27)	3	(New Zealand) Hurricanes / Wellington
Pasilio Tosi	Prop	18 July 1998 (aged 28)	17	(New Zealand) Hurricanes / Bay of Plenty
Ofa Tu'ungafasi	Prop	19 April 1992 (aged 34)	68	(New Zealand) Blues / Northland
Sam Darry	Lock	18 July 2000 (aged 26)	10	(New Zealand) Blues / Canterbury
Jamie Hannah	Lock	31 October 2002 (aged 23)	1	(New Zealand) Crusaders / Canterbury
Fabian Holland	Lock	9 October 2002 (aged 23)	14	(New Zealand) Highlanders / Otago
Josh Lord	Lock	17 January 2001 (aged 25)	16	(New Zealand) Chiefs / Taranaki
Patrick Tuipulotu	Lock	23 January 1993 (aged 33)	58	(New Zealand) Blues / Auckland
Tupou Vaa'i	Lock	27 January 2000 (aged 26)	49	(New Zealand) Chiefs / Taranaki
Ethan Blackadder	Loose forward	22 March 1995 (aged 31)	15	(New Zealand) Crusaders / Tasman
Luke Jacobson	Loose forward	20 April 1997 (aged 29)	29	(New Zealand) Chiefs / Waikato
Peter Lakai	Loose forward	4 March 2003 (aged 23)	12	(New Zealand) Hurricanes / Wellington
Simon Parker	Loose forward	6 May 2000 (aged 26)	10	(New Zealand) Chiefs / Northland
Ardie Savea (c)	Loose forward	14 October 1993 (aged 32)	111	(New Zealand) Moana Pasifika / Wellington
Wallace Sititi	Loose forward	7 September 2002 (aged 23)	21	(New Zealand) Chiefs / North Harbour
Semisi Tupou Ta'eiloa	Loose forward	25 November 2003 (aged 22)	0	(New Zealand) Moana Pasifika / Southland
Noah Hotham	Half-back	23 May 2003 (aged 23)	3	(New Zealand) Crusaders / Tasman
Kyle Preston	Half-back	13 September 1999 (aged 26)	3	(New Zealand) Crusaders / Wellington
Cortez Ratima	Half-back	22 March 2001 (aged 25)	24	(New Zealand) Chiefs / Waikato
Cam Roigard	Half-back	16 November 2000 (aged 25)	22	(New Zealand) Hurricanes / Counties Manukau
Beauden Barrett	First five-eighth	27 May 1991 (aged 35)	144	(New Zealand) Blues / Taranaki
Josh Jacomb	First five-eighth	23 June 2001 (aged 25)	0	(New Zealand) Chiefs / Taranaki
Ruben Love	First five-eighth	28 April 2001 (aged 25)	10	(New Zealand) Hurricanes / Wellington
Damian McKenzie	First five-eighth	20 April 1995 (aged 31)	79	(New Zealand) Chiefs / Waikato
Richie Mo'unga	First five-eighth	25 May 1994 (aged 32)	56	(New Zealand) Crusaders / Canterbury
Jordie Barrett	Centre	17 February 1997 (aged 29)	83	(New Zealand) Hurricanes / Taranaki
Anton Lienert-Brown	Centre	15 April 1995 (aged 31)	92	(New Zealand) Chiefs / Waikato
Quinn Tupaea	Centre	10 May 1999 (aged 27)	28	(New Zealand) Chiefs / Waikato
Timoci Tavatavanawai	Centre	14 February 1998 (aged 28)	2	(New Zealand) Highlanders / Tasman
Leroy Carter	Wing	24 February 1999 (aged 27)	9	(New Zealand) Chiefs / Bay of Plenty
Fehi Fineanganofo	Wing	31 August 2002 (aged 23)	1	(New Zealand) Hurricanes / Bay of Plenty
Rieko Ioane	Wing	18 March 1997 (aged 29)	88	(New Zealand) Blues / Auckland
Josh Moorby	Wing	11 July 1998 (aged 28)	3	(New Zealand) Hurricanes / Waikato
Emoni Narawa	Wing	13 July 1999 (aged 27)	4	(New Zealand) Chiefs / Bay of Plenty
Will Jordan	Fullback	24 February 1998 (aged 28)	59	(New Zealand) Crusaders / Tasman

=== South Africa ===
On 22 July 2026, South Africa named a 43-player squad ahead of their test match against Argentina and the four tests against New Zealand.

Coaching team:

- Head coach: (South Africa) Rassie Erasmus
- Attack coach: (New Zealand) Tony Brown
- Defence coach: (Ireland) Jerry Flannery
- Forwards coach: (South Africa) Deon Davids
- Backs coach: (South Africa) Mzwandile Stick
- Assistant coach: (South Africa) Duane Vermeulen
- Assistant coach: (Ireland) Felix Jones
- Scrum consultant: (South Africa) Daan Human
- Strength And Conditioning Coach: (England) Andy Edwards
- Laws Advisor: (South Africa) Jaco Peyper

Note: Ages and clubs are listed as of the first test match on 22 August.

Player	Position	Date of birth (age)	Caps	Club/province
Deon Fourie	Hooker	25 September 1986 (aged 39)	13	(South Africa) Stormers
Johan Grobbelaar	Hooker	30 December 1997 (aged 28)	10	(South Africa) Bulls
Malcolm Marx	Hooker	13 July 1994 (aged 32)	89	(Japan) Kubota Spears
Jan-Hendrik Wessels	Hooker	8 May 2001 (aged 25)	13	(South Africa) Bulls
Thomas du Toit	Prop	5 May 1995 (aged 31)	34	(South Africa) Sharks
Wilco Louw	Prop	20 July 1994 (aged 32)	31	(South Africa) Stormers
Ox Nche	Prop	23 July 1995 (aged 31)	48	(South Africa) Sharks
Zachary Porthen	Prop	31 March 2004 (aged 22)	6	(South Africa) Stormers
Carlü Sadie	Prop	7 May 1997 (aged 29)	1	(France) Bordeaux Bègles
Gerhard Steenekamp	Prop	9 April 1997 (aged 29)	19	(South Africa) Bulls
Boan Venter	Prop	12 April 1997 (aged 29)	10	(South Africa) Lions
Lood de Jager	Lock	17 December 1992 (aged 33)	74	(Japan) Wild Knights
Eben Etzebeth	Lock	29 October 1991 (aged 34)	142	(South Africa) Sharks
Franco Mostert	Lock	27 November 1990 (aged 35)	84	(Japan) Honda Heat
Ruan Nortjé	Lock	25 July 1998 (aged 28)	20	(Japan) Kubota Spears
Cobus Wiese	Lock	2 June 1997 (aged 29)	5	(South Africa) Bulls
Paul de Villiers	Back row	13 January 2003 (aged 23)	3	(South Africa) Stormers
Ben-Jason Dixon	Back row	29 April 1998 (aged 28)	11	(South Africa) Stormers
Pieter-Steph du Toit	Back row	20 August 1992 (aged 34)	98	(Japan) Toyota Verblitz
Cameron Hanekom	Back row	10 May 2002 (aged 24)	3	(South Africa) Bulls
Siya Kolisi (c)	Back row	16 June 1991 (aged 35)	104	(South Africa) Stormers
Elrigh Louw	Back row	20 September 1999 (aged 26)	15	(South Africa) Bulls
Vincent Tshituka	Back row	10 September 1998 (aged 27)	2	(South Africa) Sharks
Marco van Staden	Back row	25 August 1995 (aged 30)	36	(South Africa) Bulls
Jasper Wiese	Back row	21 October 1995 (aged 30)	45	(Japan) Urayasu D-Rocks
Herschel Jantjies	Scrum-half	22 April 1996 (aged 30)	25	(France) Bayonnais
Cobus Reinach	Scrum-half	7 February 1990 (aged 36)	53	(South Africa) Stormers
Morné van den Berg	Scrum-half	24 August 1997 (aged 28)	7	(South Africa) Lions
Grant Williams	Scrum-half	22 July 1996 (aged 30)	30	(Japan) Kobelco Kobe Steelers
Sacha Feinberg-Mngomezulu	Fly-half	22 February 2002 (aged 24)	20	(South Africa) Stormers
Manie Libbok	Fly-half	15 July 1997 (aged 29)	30	(Japan) Kintetsu Liners
Vusi Moyo	Fly-half	21 June 2006 (aged 20)	1	(South Africa) Sharks
Handré Pollard	Fly-half	11 March 1994 (aged 32)	87	(South Africa) Bulls
Damian de Allende	Centre	25 November 1991 (aged 34)	99	(Japan) Saitama Wild Knights
André Esterhuizen	Centre	30 March 1994 (aged 32)	31	(South Africa) Sharks
Jesse Kriel	Centre	15 February 1994 (aged 32)	90	(Japan) Yokohama Canon Eagles
Kurt-Lee Arendse	Wing	7 June 1996 (aged 30)	32	(Japan) Sagamihara Dynaboars
Ethan Hooker	Wing	20 January 2003 (aged 23)	10	(South Africa) Sharks
Cheslin Kolbe	Wing	28 October 1993 (aged 32)	50	(South Africa) Stormers
Canan Moodie	Wing	5 November 2002 (aged 23)	25	(South Africa) Bulls
Edwill van der Merwe	Wing	12 April 1996 (aged 30)	7	(South Africa) Sharks
Aphelele Fassi	Fullback	23 January 1998 (aged 28)	18	(Japan) Toshiba Brave Lupus Tokyo
Quan Horn	Fullback	27 June 2001 (aged 25)	2	(South Africa) Lions
Damian Willemse	Fullback	7 May 1998 (aged 28)	52	(South Africa) Stormers

== Matches ==
=== Stormers v New Zealand ===
7 August 2026
19:10 SAST (UTC+2)

Stormers	21–38	New Zealand
Try: Fourie 15' c Senatla 56' c Penalty try 78'; Con: Ahmed (2/2) 16', 57'	Report	Try: Taukei'aho 5' c Parker 39' c Ioane 67' c Carter 72' c Moorby 76' m Aumua 80+1' m Con: B.Barrett (3/3) 6', 40', 68'; Jacomb (1/3) 73'

Cape Town Stadium, Cape Town
Attendance: 47,130
Referee: Karl Dickson (England)

Team details

FB	15	Warrick Gelant
RW	14	Seabelo Senatla
OC	13	Ruhan Nel (c)	(substituted off) 43'
IC	12	Jonathan Roche
LW	11	Leolin Zas
FH	10	Yaqeen Ahmed
SH	9	Imad Khan	(substituted off) 4'
N8	8	Evan Roos
OF	7	Hacjivah Dayimani
BF	6	Deon Fourie	(substituted off) 62'
RL	5	Connor Evans
LL	4	Adré Smith	(substituted off) 62'
TP	3	Neethling Fouché	(substituted off) 74'
HK	2	Andre-Hugo Venter	(substituted off) 63'
LP	1	Vernon Matongo	(substituted off) 45'
Substitutions:
HK	16	JJ Kotze	(substituted on) 63'
PR	17	Ntuthuko Mchunu	(substituted on) 45'
PR	18	Herman Lubbe	(substituted on) 74'
BR	19	Ruan Ackermann	(substituted on) 62'
BR	20	Keke Morabe	(substituted on) 62'
BR	21	Wandile Mlaba		(substituted on) 69'
SH	22	Dewaldt Duvenage	(substituted on) 4'	(substituted off) 69'
CE	23	Wandisile Simelane	(substituted on) 43'
Coach:
John Dobson

FB	15	Josh Moorby	(yellow card) 78'
RW	14	Leroy Carter
OC	13	Billy Proctor		(substituted off) 46'
IC	12	Anton Lienert-Brown	(yellow card) 12'
LW	11	Rieko Ioane
FH	10	Beauden Barrett		(substituted off) 69'
SH	9	Cortez Ratima		(substituted off) 74'
N8	8	Peter Lakai
OF	7	Anton Segner		(substituted off) 59'
BF	6	Simon Parker	(yellow card) 13'
RL	5	Patrick Tuipulotu (c)
LL	4	Fabian Holland		(substituted off) 59'
TP	3	Pasilio Tosi		(substituted off) 48'
HK	2	Samisoni Taukei'aho		(substituted off) 62'
LP	1	George Bower		(substituted off) 57'
Substitutions:
HK	16	Asafo Aumua		(substituted on) 62'
PR	17	Ollie Norris		(substituted on) 57'
PR	18	Siale Lauaki		(substituted on) 48'
LK	19	Sam Darry		(substituted on) 59'
BR	20	Ethan Blackadder		(substituted on) 59'
SH	21	Kyle Preston		(substituted on) 74'
FH	22	Josh Jacomb		(substituted on) 69'
WG	23	Caleb Clarke		(substituted on) 46'
Coach:
Dave Rennie

Player of the Match:
Anton Lienert-Brown (New Zealand)

Assistant referees:
Matthew Carley (England)
Hollie Davidson (Scotland)
Television match official:
Andrew Jackson (England)
Foul play review officer:
Mike Adamson (Scotland)

=== Sharks v New Zealand ===
11 August 2026
19:10 SAST (UTC+2)

Sharks	0–54	New Zealand
	Report	Try: Fineanganofo (2) 19' c, 54' c McKenzie 28' c Clarke 46' c J. Barrett 60' c Preston 63' c Tavatavanawai 70' m Darry 75' c Con: Love (7/8) 20', 30', 47', 54', 61', 63', 76'

Kings Park Stadium, Durban
Attendance: 14,759
Referee: Matthew Carley (England)

Team details

FB	15	Zekhethelo Siyaya
RW	14	Donavan Don	(substituted off) 48'
OC	13	Jurenzo Julius
IC	12	Murray Koster	(substituted off) 61'
LW	11	Litelihle Bester
FH	10	Vusi Moyo
SH	9	Bradley Davids	(substituted off) 54'
N8	8	Nick Hatton (c)
OF	7	Emmanuel Tshituka
BF	6	Phepsi Buthelezi	(substituted off) 58'
RL	5	Deon Slabbert
LL	4	Hendré Stassen	(substituted off) 23'
TP	3	Vincent Koch	(substituted off) 58'
HK	2	Eduan Swart	(substituted off) 58'
LP	1	Nemo Roelofse	(substituted off) 58'
Substitutions:
HK	16	Liam van Wyk	(substituted on) 58'
PR	17	Phiwayinkosi Kubheka	(substituted on) 58'
PR	18	Simphiwe Ngobese	(substituted on) 58'
LK	19	Corne Rahl	(substituted on) 23'
BR	20	Matt Romao	(substituted on) 58'
SH	21	Ivan van Zyl	(substituted on) 54'
FB	22	Luan Giliomee	(substituted on) 48'
CE	23	Ma'a Nonu	(substituted on) 61'
Coach:
JP Pietersen

FB	15	Damian McKenzie	(substituted off) 33'
RW	14	Fehi Fineanganofo
OC	13	Quinn Tupaea
IC	12	Jordie Barrett	(substituted off) 63'
LW	11	Caleb Clarke
FH	10	Ruben Love
SH	9	Kyle Preston	(substituted off) 70'
N8	8	Wallace Sititi	(substituted off) 58'
OF	7	Luke Jacobson (c)
BF	6	Tupou Vaa'i	(substituted off) 63'
RL	5	Sam Darry
LL	4	Josh Lord
TP	3	Fletcher Newell	(substituted off) 54'
HK	2	Asafo Aumua	(substituted off) 54'
LP	1	Ethan de Groot	(substituted off) 54'
Substitutions:
HK	16	Bradley Slater	(substituted on) 54'
PR	17	Ollie Norris	(substituted on) 54'
PR	18	Pasilio Tosi	(substituted on) 54'
LK	19	Ethan Blackadder	(substituted on) 63'
BR	20	Semisi Tupou Ta'eiloa	(substituted on) 58'
SH	21	Cortez Ratima	(substituted on) 70'
CE	22	Timoci Tavatavanawai	(substituted on) 63'
WG	23	Emoni Narawa	(substituted on) 33'
Coach:
Dave Rennie

Player of the Match:
Jordie Barrett (New Zealand)

Assistant referees:
Karl Dickson (England)
Hollie Davidson (Scotland)
Television match official:
Mike Adamson (Scotland)
Foul play review officer:
Andrew Jackson (England)

=== Bulls v New Zealand ===
15 August 2026
19:10 SAST (UTC+2)

Bulls	19–50	New Zealand
Try: Vermaak 42' c Jacobs 54' m Coetzee 73' c Con: Bosch (2/3) 43', 74'	Report	Try: Moorby (2) 14' m, 19' c Taylor (2) 32' m, 40+1' c Carter (2) 44' m, 66' c Ioane 49' c Sititi 77' c Con: B. Barrett (1/2) 19'; Jacomb (4/6) 40+2', 50', 67', 78'

Loftus Versfeld Stadium, Pretoria
Attendance: 30,930
Referee: Nika Amashukeli (Georgia)

Team details

FB	15	Willie le Roux		(substituted off) 72'
RW	14	Thaakir Abrahams
OC	13	Stedman Gans
IC	12	Harold Vorster		(substituted off) 52'
LW	11	Stravino Jacobs
FH	10	Curwin Bosch
SH	9	Embrose Papier		(substituted off) 52'
N8	8	Jeandré Rudolph		(substituted off) 61'
OF	7	Hanro Liebenberg		(substituted off) 29'	(substituted on) 40'	(substituted off) 40'
BF	6	Marcell Coetzee (c)
RL	5	JF van Heerden
LL	4	Ruan Vermaak		(substituted off) 44'
TP	3	Francois Klopper	(yellow card) 28'	(substituted off) 64'
HK	2	Juann Else		(substituted off) 40'	(substituted on) 61'
LP	1	Alulutho Tshakweni		(substituted off) 26'
Substitutions:
HK	16	Johan Grobbelaar		(substituted on) 40'
PR	17	Sti Sithole		(substituted on) 26'
PR	18	Khutha Mchunu		(substituted on) 29'	(substituted off) 40'	(substituted on) 64'
LK	19	Reinhardt Ludwig		(substituted on) 44'
BR	20	Elrigh Louw		(substituted on) 40'
SH	21	Paul de Wet		(substituted on) 52'
CE	22	Katlego Letebele		(substituted on) 52'
FB	23	Hakeem Kunene		(substituted on) 72'
Coach:
Johan Ackermann

FB	15	Beauden Barrett	(substituted off) 72'
RW	14	Leroy Carter
OC	13	Rieko Ioane
IC	12	Anton Lienert-Brown	(substituted off) 64'
LW	11	Josh Moorby
FH	10	Josh Jacomb
SH	9	Cortez Ratima	(substituted off) 40'
N8	8	Peter Lakai	(substituted off) 54'
OF	7	Anton Segner
BF	6	Simon Parker
RL	5	Patrick Tuipulotu	(substituted off) 50'
LL	4	Fabian Holland
TP	3	Tyrel Lomax	(substituted off) 60'
HK	2	Codie Taylor (c)	(substituted off) 40'
LP	1	Xavier Numia	(substituted off) 40'
Substitutions:
HK	16	Samisoni Taukei'aho	(substituted on) 40'
PR	17	George Bower	(substituted on) 40'
PR	18	Siale Lauaki	(substituted on) 60'
LK	19	Josh Lord	(substituted on) 50'
BR	20	Wallace Sititi	(substituted on) 54'
SH	21	Kyle Preston	(substituted on) 40'
CE	22	Timoci Tavatavanawai	(substituted on) 64'
WG	23	Emoni Narawa	(substituted on) 72'
Coach:
Dave Rennie

Player of the Match:
Anton Segner (New Zealand)

Assistant referees:
Karl Dickson (England)
Matthew Carley (England)
Television match official:
Eric Gauzins (France)
Foul play review officer:
Mike Adamson (Scotland)

=== South Africa v New Zealand (first test) ===
22 August 2026
17:10 SAST (UTC+2)

South Africa	16–33	New Zealand
Try: Esterhuizen 13' c Con: Kolbe (1/1) 14'; Pen: Kolbe (3/3) 4', 26', 46'	Report	Try: Jordan (2) 8' m, 74' c Moorby 22' c Holland 47' c Jacobson 58' c Con: Love (4/5) 23', 48', 59', 75'

Ellis Park Stadium, Johannesburg
Attendance: 60,592
Referee: Matthew Carley (England)

FB	15	Damian Willemse
RW	14	Cheslin Kolbe		(substituted off) 58'
OC	13	Jesse Kriel
IC	12	Damian de Allende
LW	11	Kurt-Lee Arendse		(substituted off) 9'
FH	10	Sacha Feinberg-Mngomezulu
SH	9	Grant Williams
N8	8	Jasper Wiese
OF	7	Pieter-Steph du Toit (c)
BF	6	Paul de Villiers		(substituted off) 61'
RL	5	Ruan Nortjé
LL	4	Eben Etzebeth		(substituted off) 73'
TP	3	Wilco Louw		(substituted off) 60'
HK	2	Malcolm Marx
LP	1	Ox Nché		(substituted off) 45'
Substitutions:
HK	16	Jan-Hendrik Wessels			(substituted on) 66'
PR	17	Gerhard Steenekamp		(substituted on) 45'	(substituted off) 66'
PR	18	Zachary Porthen		(substituted on) 60'
BR	19	Cobus Wiese		(substituted on) 73'
CE	20	André Esterhuizen		(substituted on) 9'	(substituted off) 62'
BR	21	Marco van Staden	(yellow card) 68'	(substituted on) 61'
SH	22	Cobus Reinach	(yellow card) 70'	(substituted on) 58'
FH	23	Manie Libbok			(substituted on) 62'
Coach:
Rassie Erasmus

FB	15	Damian McKenzie
RW	14	Will Jordan
OC	13	Quinn Tupaea	(substituted off) 75'
IC	12	Jordie Barrett
LW	11	Josh Moorby	(substituted off) 63'
FH	10	Ruben Love
SH	9	Cam Roigard	(substituted off) 75'
N8	8	Ardie Savea (c)
OF	7	Luke Jacobson	(substituted off) 75'
BF	6	Tupou Vaa'i
RL	5	Fabian Holland
LL	4	Josh Lord	(substituted off) 37'
TP	3	Tyrel Lomax	(substituted off) 50'
HK	2	Codie Taylor	(substituted off) 54'
LP	1	Ethan de Groot	(substituted off) 37'
Substitutions:
HK	16	Asafo Aumua	(substituted on) 54'
PR	17	George Bower	(substituted on) 37'
PR	18	Fletcher Newell	(substituted on) 50'
BR	19	Simon Parker	(substituted on) 37'
BR	20	Peter Lakai	(substituted on) 75'
SH	21	Kyle Preston	(substituted on) 75'
CE	22	Anton Lienert-Brown	(substituted on) 75'
WG	23	Leroy Carter	(substituted on) 63'
Coach:
Dave Rennie

Player of the Match:
Will Jordan (New Zealand)

Assistant referees:
Karl Dickson (England)
Nika Amashukeli (Georgia)
Television match official:
Mike Adamson (Scotland)
Foul play review officer:
Eric Gauzins (France)

Notes:

- Damian de Allende became the tenth Springbok player to earn 100 test caps.

=== Lions v New Zealand ===
25 August 2026
19:10 SAST (UTC+2)

Lions	35–41	New Zealand
Try: Steyn 4' c Mahashe 6' c Mpeku 32' c Cronjé 40' c F. Horn 46' c Con: Smith (5/5) 5', 7', 33', 41', 47'	Report	Try: Hotham 10' c Narawa (2) 24' m, 79' m Blackadder (2) 35' m, 62' m Ioane (2) 49' c, 55' c Con: B. Barrett (1/3) 10'; Mo'unga (2/4) 50', 56'

Ellis Park Stadium, Johannesburg
Attendance: 15,956
Referee: Angus Gardner (Australia)

Team details

FB	15	Quan Horn
RW	14	Kelly Mpeku
OC	13	Henco van Wyk	(substituted off) 71'
IC	12	Richard Kriel
LW	11	Erich Cronjé
FH	10	Chris Smith
SH	9	Nico Steyn	(substituted off) 53'
N8	8	Francke Horn (c)	(substituted off) 63'
OF	7	Batho Hlekani	(substituted off) 63'
BF	6	Siba Mahashe
RL	5	Ruan Delport
LL	4	Etienne Oosthuizen	(substituted off) 18'
TP	3	Sebastian Lombard	(substituted off) 38'	(substituted on) 40'	(substituted off) 51'
HK	2	PJ Botha	(substituted off) 51'
LP	1	SJ Kotze	(substituted off) 51'
Substitutions:
HK	16	Morné Brandon	(substituted on) 51'
PR	17	Boan Venter	(substituted on) 51'
PR	18	RF Schoeman	(substituted on) 38'	(substituted off) 40'	(substituted on) 51'
LK	19	Hyron Andrews	(substituted on) 18'
BR	20	Sikhumbuzo Notshe	(substituted on) 63'
BR	21	JC Pretorius	(substituted on) 63'
SH	22	Haashim Pead	(substituted on) 53'
FH	23	Boeta Chamberlain	(substituted on) 71'
Coach:
Ivan van Rooyen

FB	15	Beauden Barrett
RW	14	Fehi Fineanganofo	(substituted off) 53'
OC	13	Rieko Ioane
IC	12	Timoci Tavatavanawai	(substituted off) 64'
LW	11	Emoni Narawa
FH	10	Richie Mo'unga
SH	9	Noah Hotham	(substituted off) 54'
N8	8	Semisi Tupou Ta'eiloa	(substituted off) 54'
OF	7	Ethan Blackadder
BF	6	Wallace Sititi
RL	5	Patrick Tuipulotu (c)	(substituted off) 48'
LL	4	Sam Darry
TP	3	Pasilio Tosi	(substituted off) 60'
HK	2	Samisoni Taukei'aho	(substituted off) 62'
LP	1	Siale Lauaki	(substituted off) 70'
Substitutions:
HK	16	Bradley Slater	(substituted on) 62'
PR	17	Xavier Numia	(substituted on) 70'
PR	18	Saula Ma'u	(substituted on) 60'
LK	19	Jamie Hannah	(substituted on) 48'
BR	20	Peter Lakai	(substituted on) 54'
SH	21	Kyle Preston	(substituted on) 54'
FH	22	Josh Jacomb	(substituted on) 64'
CE	23	Anton Lienert-Brown	(substituted on) 53'
Coach:
Dave Rennie

Player of the Match:
Siba Mahashe (Lions)

Assistant referees:
Karl Dickson (England)
Morné Ferreira (South Africa)
Television match official:
Brett Cronan (Australia)
Foul play review officer:
Eric Gauzins (France)

=== South Africa v New Zealand (second test) ===
29 August 2026
17:10 SAST (UTC+2)

South Africa	33–26	New Zealand
Try: Kriel 2' c De Allende 22' c Kolisi 38' c Con: Kolbe (3/3) 3', 23', 39'; Pen: Kolbe (4/4) 19', 49', 51', 72'	Report	Try: Roigard 9' c McKenzie 30' c Carter 66' m Savea 77' c Con: Love (3/4) 17', 31', 78'

Cape Town Stadium, Cape Town
Attendance: 56,589
Referee: Angus Gardner (Australia)

FB	15	Damian Willemse		(substituted off) 40'
RW	14	Cheslin Kolbe
OC	13	Jesse Kriel
IC	12	Damian de Allende
LW	11	Ethan Hooker
FH	10	Sacha Feinberg-Mngomezulu
SH	9	Cobus Reinach		(substituted off) 57'
N8	8	Jasper Wiese		(substituted off) 68'
BF	7	Pieter-Steph du Toit
OF	6	Siya Kolisi (c)		(substituted off) 43'
RL	5	Ruan Nortjé		(substituted off) 68'
LL	4	Eben Etzebeth
TP	3	Thomas du Toit		(substituted off) 57'
HK	2	Deon Fourie		(substituted off) 36'
LP	1	Gerhard Steenekamp		(substituted off) 36'
Substitutions:
HK	16	Malcolm Marx		(substituted on) 36'
PR	17	Ox Nché		(substituted on) 36'
PR	18	Wilco Louw		(substituted on) 57'
BR	19	Lood de Jager	(yellow card) 80'	(substituted on) 68'
CE	20	André Esterhuizen		(substituted on) 43'
BR	21	Cameron Hanekom		(substituted on) 68'
SH	22	Morné van den Berg		(substituted on) 57'
FH	23	Manie Libbok		(substituted on) 40'
Coach:
Rassie Erasmus

FB	15	Damian McKenzie
RW	14	Will Jordan
OC	13	Quinn Tupaea	(substituted off) 68'
IC	12	Jordie Barrett
LW	11	Leroy Carter
FH	10	Ruben Love
SH	9	Cam Roigard	(substituted off) 72'
N8	8	Ardie Savea (c)
OF	7	Luke Jacobson	(substituted off) 63'
BF	6	Simon Parker	(substituted off) 52'
RL	5	Tupou Vaa'i
LL	4	Fabian Holland
TP	3	Tyrel Lomax	(substituted off) 49'
HK	2	Codie Taylor	(substituted off) 49'
LP	1	George Bower	(substituted off) 54'
Substitutions:
HK	16	Asafo Aumua	(substituted on) 49'
PR	17	Xavier Numia	(substituted on) 54'
PR	18	Fletcher Newell	(substituted on) 49'
LK	19	Patrick Tuipulotu	(substituted on) 63'
BR	20	Peter Lakai	(substituted on) 52'
SH	21	Kyle Preston	(substituted on) 72'
CE	22	Anton Lienert-Brown	(substituted on) 68'
WG	23	Josh Moorby
Coach:
Dave Rennie

Player of the Match:
Cheslin Kolbe (South Africa)

Assistant referees:
Karl Dickson (England)
Sam Grove-White (Scotland)
Television match official:
Brett Cronan (Australia)
Foul play review officer:
Eric Gauzins (France)

Notes:

- Ox Nché, Malcolm Marx, Wilco Louw, Handré Pollard and Kurt-Lee Arendse were originally named in the South Africa starting line-up when the team was announced on 24 August. Pollard suffered an injury in training on 26 August and was replaced by Sacha Feinberg-Mngomezulu, while Cheslin Kolbe overcame an injury to replace Arendse in a revised team on 28 August. Nché, Marx and Louw were replaced on the day of the game by Gerhard Steenekamp, Deon Fourie and Thomas du Toit, with Nché, Marx and Louw dropping to the bench.
- Pieter-Steph du Toit became the eleventh Springbok to earn 100 test caps.
- Ox Nché (South Africa) earned his 50th test cap.

=== South Africa v New Zealand (third test) ===
5 September 2026
17:10 SAST (UTC+2)

South Africa	29–24	New Zealand
Try: Arendse 20' m Penalty try 36'; Kriel 57' c Marx 65' c Con: Feinberg-Mngomezulu (2/3) 58', 66'; Pen: Feinberg-Mngomezulu (1/1) 70'	Report	Try: Savea (2) 5' c, 25' m Jordan 55' m Taukei'aho 80+1' c Con: Love (1/3) 11'; McKenzie (1/1) 80+2'

FNB Stadium, Johannesburg
Attendance: 85,967
Referee: Nika Amashukeli (Georgia)

FB	15	Cheslin Kolbe		(substituted off) 10'
RW	14	Kurt-Lee Arendse
OC	13	Jesse Kriel
IC	12	Damian de Allende
LW	11	Ethan Hooker
FH	10	Sacha Feinberg-Mngomezulu	(yellow card) 10'
SH	9	Cobus Reinach		(substituted off) 43'
N8	8	Jasper Wiese		(substituted off) 62'
BF	7	Pieter-Steph du Toit
OF	6	Siya Kolisi (c)		(substituted off) 57'
RL	5	Ruan Nortjé
LL	4	Eben Etzebeth		(substituted off) 57'
TP	3	Wilco Louw		(substituted off) 51'
HK	2	Malcolm Marx		(substituted off) 68'
LP	1	Ox Nché		(substituted off) 57'
Substitutions:
HK	16	Deon Fourie		(substituted on) 57'
PR	17	Gerhard Steenekamp		(substituted on) 57'
PR	18	Thomas du Toit		(substituted on) 51'
BR	19	Lood de Jager		(substituted on) 57'
CE	20	André Esterhuizen		(substituted on) 68'
BR	21	Cameron Hanekom		(substituted on) 62'
SH	22	Morné van den Berg		(substituted on) 43'
FH	23	Manie Libbok		(substituted on) 10'
Coach:
Rassie Erasmus

FB	15	Damian McKenzie
RW	14	Will Jordan
OC	13	Quinn Tupaea		(substituted off) 44'
IC	12	Jordie Barrett
LW	11	Leroy Carter		(substituted off) 68'
FH	10	Ruben Love	(yellow card) 36'
SH	9	Cam Roigard		(substituted off) 67'
N8	8	Ardie Savea (c)		(substituted off) 31'
OF	7	Luke Jacobson
BF	6	Peter Lakai
RL	5	Sam Darry		(substituted off) 62'
LL	4	Tupou Vaa'i
TP	3	Tyrel Lomax		(substituted off) 46'
HK	2	Asafo Aumua		(substituted off) 62'
LP	1	George Bower		(substituted off) 46'
Substitutions:
HK	16	Samisoni Taukei'aho		(substituted on) 62'
PR	17	Xavier Numia		(substituted on) 46'
PR	18	Fletcher Newell		(substituted on) 46'
LK	19	Fabian Holland		(substituted on) 62'
BR	20	Wallace Sititi		(substituted on) 31'
SH	21	Kyle Preston		(substituted on) 67'
CE	22	Anton Lienert-Brown		(substituted on) 44'
WG	23	Josh Moorby		(substituted on) 68'
Coach:
Dave Rennie

Player of the Match:
Ethan Hooker (South Africa)

Assistant referees:
Angus Gardner (Australia)
Christophe Ridley (England)
Television match official:
Eric Gauzins (France)
Foul play review officer:
Brett Cronan (Australia)

Notes:

- Tupou Vaa'i (New Zealand) earned his 50th test cap.

=== South Africa v New Zealand (fourth test) ===
12 September 2026
17:00 EDT (UTC-04)

South Africa	43–28	New Zealand
Try: De Allende 14' c van den Berg 21' c Marx 48' c P. du Toit 51' c Arendse 71' c Hanekom 75' c Con: Feinberg-Mngomezulu (2/3) 15', 22' van den Berg (1/1) 52'; Libbok (2/2) 72'. 76'; Pen: Feinberg-Mngomezulu (1/2) 3'	Report	Try: Taylor 7' c Jordan 36' c Blackadder 62' c B. Barrett 79' c Con: McKenzie (4/4) 8', 37', 63', 79'

M&T Bank Stadium, Baltimore, United States
Attendance: 68,173
Referee: Karl Dickson (England)

FB	15	Damian Willemse	(substituted off) 57'
RW	14	Kurt-Lee Arendse
OC	13	Jesse Kriel
IC	12	Damian de Allende
LW	11	Ethan Hooker
FH	10	Sacha Feinberg-Mngomezulu	(substituted off) 60'
SH	9	Morné van den Berg
N8	8	Jasper Wiese
BF	7	Pieter-Steph du Toit	(substituted off) 65'
OF	6	Siya Kolisi (c)	(substituted off) 43'
RL	5	Ruan Nortjé	(substituted off) 43'
LL	4	Eben Etzebeth
TP	3	Wilco Louw	(substituted off) 43'
HK	2	Malcolm Marx	(substituted off) 49'
LP	1	Ox Nché	(substituted off) 43'
Substitutions:
HK	16	Deon Fourie	(substituted on) 49'
PR	17	Gerhard Steenekamp	(substituted on) 43'
PR	18	Thomas du Toit	(substituted on) 43'
BR	19	Lood de Jager	(substituted on) 43'
CE	20	André Esterhuizen	(substituted on) 43'
BR	21	Cameron Hanekom	(substituted on) 65'
SH	22	Cobus Reinach	(substituted on) 60'
FH	23	Manie Libbok	(substituted on) 57'
Coach:
Rassie Erasmus

FB	15	Damian McKenzie
RW	14	Will Jordan
OC	13	Anton Lienert-Brown	(substituted off) 39'
IC	12	Jordie Barrett
LW	11	Josh Moorby	(substituted off) 71'
FH	10	Richie Mo'unga
SH	9	Cam Roigard	(substituted off) 65'
N8	8	Peter Lakai	(substituted off) 6'	(substituted on) 18'
OF	7	Ethan Blackadder
BF	6	Tupou Vaa'i
RL	5	Sam Darry	(substituted off) 57'
LL	4	Patrick Tuipulotu			(substituted off) 54'
TP	3	Fletcher Newell	(substituted off) 48'
HK	2	Codie Taylor (c)	(substituted off) 48'
LP	1	Ethan de Groot	(substituted off) 48'
Substitutions:
HK	16	Asafo Aumua	(substituted on) 48'
PR	17	Xavier Numia	(substituted on) 48'
PR	18	Tyrel Lomax	(substituted on) 48'
LK	19	Josh Lord	(substituted on) 57'
BR	20	Wallace Sititi	(substituted on) 6'	(substituted off) 18'	(substituted on) 54'
SH	21	Kyle Preston	(substituted on) 65'
CE	22	Rieko Ioane	(substituted on) 39'
FH	23	Beauden Barrett	(substituted on) 71'
Coach:
Dave Rennie

Player of the Match:
Morné van den Berg (South Africa)

Assistant referees:
Matthew Carley (England)
Christophe Ridley (England)
Television match official:
Andrew Jackson (England)
Foul play review officer:
Matteo Liperini (Italy)

Notes

- The 68,173 match attendance was a record attendance for a rugby test match in the United States.
- This was the first test match between South Africa and New Zealand in the United States.

== Statistics ==
=== New Zealand player statistics ===
Key

- Con: Conversions
- Pen: Penalties
- DG: Drop goals
- Pts: Points

Name	Non-test						Test						Overall						Cards
Name	Played	Tries	Con	Pen	DG	Pts	Played	Tries	Con	Pen	DG	Pts	Played	Tries	Con	Pen	DG	Pts	Cards
Ruben Love	1	0	7	0	0	14	3	0	8	0	0	16	4	0	15	0	0	30	1 (yellow card)
Josh Moorby	2	3	0	0	0	15	3	1	0	0	0	5	5	4	0	0	0	20	1 (yellow card)
Rieko Ioane	3	4	0	0	0	20	1	0	0	0	0	0	4	4	0	0	0	20	–
Leroy Carter	2	3	0	0	0	15	3	1	0	0	0	5	5	4	0	0	0	20	–
Will Jordan	0	0	0	0	0	0	4	4	0	0	0	20	4	4	0	0	0	20	–
Damian McKenzie	1	1	0	0	0	5	4	1	5	0	0	15	5	2	5	0	0	20	–
Ardie Savea	0	0	0	0	0	0	3	3	0	0	0	15	3	3	0	0	0	15	–
Beauden Barrett	3	0	5	0	0	10	1	1	0	0	0	5	4	1	5	0	0	15	–
Ethan Blackadder	3	2	0	0	0	10	1	1	0	0	0	5	4	3	0	0	0	15	–
Codie Taylor	1	2	0	0	0	10	3	1	0	0	0	5	4	3	0	0	0	15	–
Josh Jacomb	3	0	5	0	0	10	0	0	0	0	0	0	3	0	5	0	0	10	–
Emoni Narawa	3	2	0	0	0	10	0	0	0	0	0	0	3	2	0	0	0	10	–
Samisoni Taukei'aho	2	1	0	0	0	5	1	1	0	0	0	5	3	2	0	0	0	10	–
Fehi Fineanganofo	2	2	0	0	0	10	0	0	0	0	0	0	2	2	0	0	0	10	–
Kyle Preston	4	1	0	0	0	5	4	0	0	0	0	0	8	1	0	0	0	5	–
Asafo Aumua	2	1	0	0	0	5	4	0	0	0	0	0	6	1	0	0	0	5	–
Fabian Holland	2	0	0	0	0	0	3	1	0	0	0	0	5	1	0	0	0	5	–
Jordie Barrett	1	1	0	0	0	5	4	0	0	0	0	0	5	1	0	0	0	5	–
Sam Darry	3	1	0	0	0	5	2	0	0	0	0	0	5	1	0	0	0	5	–
Luke Jacobson	1	0	0	0	0	0	3	1	0	0	0	5	4	1	0	0	0	5	–
Simon Parker	2	1	0	0	0	5	2	0	0	0	0	0	4	1	0	0	0	5	1 (yellow card)
Wallace Sititi	3	1	0	0	0	5	2	0	0	0	0	0	5	1	0	0	0	5	–
Cam Roigard	0	0	0	0	0	0	4	1	0	0	0	5	4	1	0	0	0	5	–
Timoci Tavatavanawai	3	1	0	0	0	5	0	0	0	0	0	0	3	1	0	0	0	5	–
Caleb Clarke	2	1	0	0	0	5	0	0	0	0	0	0	2	1	0	0	0	5	–
Noah Hotham	1	1	0	0	0	5	0	0	0	0	0	0	1	1	0	0	0	5	–
Richie Mo'unga	1	0	2	0	0	4	1	0	0	0	0	0	2	0	2	0	0	4	–
Peter Lakai	3	0	0	0	0	0	4	0	0	0	0	0	7	0	0	0	0	0	–
Anton Lienert-Brown	3	0	0	0	0	0	4	0	0	0	0	0	7	0	0	0	0	0	1 (yellow card)
George Bower	2	0	0	0	0	0	3	0	0	0	0	0	5	0	0	0	0	0	–
Siale Lauaki	4	0	0	0	0	0	0	0	0	0	0	0	4	0	0	0	0	0	–
Tyrel Lomax	1	0	0	0	0	0	4	0	0	0	0	0	5	0	0	0	0	0	–
Fletcher Newell	1	0	0	0	0	0	4	0	0	0	0	0	5	0	0	0	0	0	–
Xavier Numia	2	0	0	0	0	0	3	0	0	0	0	0	5	0	0	0	0	0	–
Patrick Tuipulotu	3	0	0	0	0	0	2	0	0	0	0	0	5	0	0	0	0	0	–
Quinn Tupaea	1	0	0	0	0	0	3	0	0	0	0	0	4	0	0	0	0	0	–
Tupou Vaa'i	1	0	0	0	0	0	4	0	0	0	0	0	5	0	0	0	0	0	–
Josh Lord	2	0	0	0	0	0	2	0	0	0	0	0	4	0	0	0	0	0	–
Cortez Ratima	3	0	0	0	0	0	0	0	0	0	0	0	3	0	0	0	0	0	–
Pasilio Tosi	3	0	0	0	0	0	0	0	0	0	0	0	3	0	0	0	0	0	–
Ethan de Groot	1	0	0	0	0	0	2	0	0	0	0	0	3	0	0	0	0	0	–
Ollie Norris	2	0	0	0	0	0	0	0	0	0	0	0	2	0	0	0	0	0	–
Anton Segner	2	0	0	0	0	0	0	0	0	0	0	0	2	0	0	0	0	0	–
Bradley Slater	2	0	0	0	0	0	0	0	0	0	0	0	2	0	0	0	0	0	–
Semisi Tupou Ta'eiloa	2	0	0	0	0	0	0	0	0	0	0	0	2	0	0	0	0	0	–
Jamie Hannah	1	0	0	0	0	0	0	0	0	0	0	0	1	0	0	0	0	0	–
Saula Ma'u	1	0	0	0	0	0	0	0	0	0	0	0	1	0	0	0	0	0	–
Billy Proctor	1	0	0	0	0	0	0	0	0	0	0	0	1	0	0	0	0	0	–
Ofa Tu'ungafasi	Did not play - Selected to play against the Lions but withdrawn due to illness. Returned home before the 4th test.																		
George Bell	Did not play – Withdrawn due to injury before playing a game																		

=== Test match statistics ===
Key

- Con: Conversions
- Pen: Penalties
- DG: Drop goals
- Pts: Points

Rank	Name	Team	Tries	Con	Pen	DG	Pts
1	Cheslin Kolbe	South Africa	–	4	7	–	29
2	Will Jordan	New Zealand	4	–	–	–	20
3	Ruben Love	New Zealand	–	8	0	–	16
4	Ardie Savea	New Zealand	3	–	–	–	15
4	Damian de Allende	South Africa	3	–	–	–	15
4	Damian McKenzie	New Zealand	1	5	–	–	15
7	Sacha Feinberg-Mngomezulu	South Africa	–	4	2	–	14
8	Jesse Kriel	South Africa	2	–	–	–	10
8	Kurt-Lee Arendse	South Africa	2	–	–	–	10
10	Morné van den Berg	South Africa	1	1	–	–	7
11	Leroy Carter	New Zealand	1	–	–	–	5
11	André Esterhuizen	South Africa	1	–	–	–	5
11	Fabian Holland	New Zealand	1	–	–	–	5
11	Luke Jacobson	New Zealand	1	–	–	–	5
11	Siya Kolisi	South Africa	1	–	–	–	5
11	Malcolm Marx	South Africa	1	–	–	–	5
11	Josh Moorby	New Zealand	1	–	–	–	5
11	Cam Roigard	New Zealand	1	–	–	–	5
11	Samisoni Taukei'aho	New Zealand	1	–	–	–	5
11	Codie Taylor	New Zealand	1	–	–	–	5
11	Ethan Blackadder	New Zealand	1	–	–	–	5
11	Beauden Barrett	New Zealand	1	–	–	–	5
11	Pieter-Steph du Toit	South Africa	1	–	–	–	5
11	Cameron Hanekom	South Africa	1	–	–	–	5
25	Manie Libbok	South Africa	-	2	–	–	4

== See also ==
- Freedom Cup
- 2026 New Zealand women's rugby union tour of Britain, France and South Africa
- History of rugby union matches between New Zealand and South Africa
- 2026 Australia tour of Argentina
- 2026 men's rugby union internationals
