= Freedom Cup =

Rugby union trophy, South Africa vs. New Zealand

- Sport: Rugby union
- Instituted: 2004
- Number of teams: 2
- Country: South Africa; New Zealand
- Holders: South Africa (2026)
- Most titles: New Zealand (16 titles)

The Freedom Cup (Afrikaans: Vryheidsbeker) is a minor international rugby union trophy contested between South Africa and New Zealand as part of The Rugby Championship. It is a glass goblet on a wooden base.

As of 2026, it has been contested 21 times with New Zealand winning or retaining the trophy 16 times while South Africa have done so 5 times.

== History ==
The Freedom Cup was introduced to mark the 10 year anniversary of South African democracy in 2004. Although the teams played each other multiple times a year, the original idea was for the cup to be contested only once every second year, in a single nominated match rather than over an entire Tri-Nations tournament (as the Rugby Championship was then known).

The first winners of the Freedom Cup were the Springboks, following a 40-26 victory at Ellis Park, Johannesburg, during the 2004 Tri Nations Series. As part of the democracy celebrations that the cup represented, Nelson Mandela attended the match.

In keeping with the original plan, there were no Freedom Cup matches in 2005. However, starting with the 2006 Tri Nations Series, the two nations agreed that it would become a bilateral series trophy, contested in all three (later two) New Zealand–South Africa matches. The All Blacks won the first two matches that year, but after South Africa's victory in the third game, Supersport presenter Joost van der Westhuizen incorrectly presented the trophy to Springbok captain John Smit who accepted it in front of millions of television viewers. The mistake was corrected after the South Africans had begun parading with the trophy.

In 2015 the Freedom Cup broke off its base when New Zealand captain Richie McCaw unboxed it ahead of that year's one-off test. It was repaired in New Zealand and travelled to South Africa, where it was retained by the visitors.

== Bilateral series within Tri-Nations and Rugby Championships ==
The Freedom Cup was awarded annually from 2006-2025 (except 2020, due to COVID), going to whichever team won more of that year's Tri-Nations or Rugby Championship matches between the two teams. In drawn series the holder retains the cup.

Tri-Nations tournaments featured three tests between South Africa and New Zealand, except in World Cup years (2007, 2011) when only two were played. From 2012 the Tri-Nations expanded to the four-team Rugby Championship and the new draw reduced the number of Freedom Cup matches by one (two matches most years; one in World Cup years).

Due to COVID pandemic travel restrictions there were no Freedom Cup matches in 2020, and in 2021 Australia hosted both matches, meaning that the Freedom Cup was contested on neutral ground for the first time. Later, one match was played in Baltimore, United States in 2026.

=== "Greatest Rivalry" tours ===
From 2026 the two countries agreed to four-yearly tours known as "Rugby's Greatest Rivalry". These test series will replace the Rugby Championship in those years and feature a different trophy. As a result, the Freedom Cup will also be at stake. The new trophy's halves each represent one of the two nations. It is held together by magnets and can be separated if the four-test series is drawn.

== Matches ==
As of 13 September 2026.

Host	P	New Zealand	South Africa	D	New Zealand points	South Africa points
New Zealand	18	13	4	1	528	310
South Africa	23	12	11	0	638	573
Neutral Venue (Note: Due to the effects of the Covid-19 pandemic, the two tests played during the 2021 Rugby Championship were both staged in Queensland, Australia. Later, in 2026, the final game of the 2026 New Zealand tour of South Africa was played in Baltimore, United States.)	3	1	2	0	76	91
Overall	44	26	17	1	1,242	974

== Results ==
Year	Date	Venue	Home	Score	Away	Trophy Winner
2026	12 September	M&T Bank Stadium, Baltimore (United States)	South Africa	43–28	New Zealand	South Africa
2026	5 September	FNB Stadium, Johannesburg	South Africa	29–24	New Zealand	South Africa
2026	29 August	Cape Town Stadium, Cape Town	South Africa	33–26	New Zealand	South Africa
2026	22 August	Ellis Park, Johannesburg	South Africa	16–33	New Zealand	South Africa
2025	13 September	Sky Stadium, Wellington	New Zealand	10–43	South Africa	South Africa
2025	6 September	Eden Park, Auckland	New Zealand	24–17	South Africa	South Africa
2024	7 September	Cape Town Stadium, Cape Town	South Africa	18–12	New Zealand	South Africa
2024	31 August	Ellis Park, Johannesburg	South Africa	31–27	New Zealand	South Africa
2023	15 July	Mt Smart Stadium, Auckland	New Zealand	35–20	South Africa	New Zealand
2022	13 August	Ellis Park, Johannesburg	South Africa	23–35	New Zealand	New Zealand
2022	6 August	Mbombela Stadium, Nelspruit	South Africa	26–10	New Zealand	New Zealand
2021	2 October	Robina Stadium, Gold Coast (Australia)	South Africa	31–29	New Zealand	New Zealand
2021	25 September	North Queensland Stadium, Townsville (Australia)	New Zealand	19–17	South Africa	New Zealand
2019	27 July	Wellington Regional Stadium, Wellington	New Zealand	16–16	South Africa	New Zealand
2018	6 October	Loftus Versfeld Stadium, Pretoria	South Africa	30–32	New Zealand	New Zealand
2018	15 September	Wellington Regional Stadium, Wellington	New Zealand	34–36	South Africa	New Zealand
2017	7 October	Newlands Stadium, Cape Town	South Africa	24–25	New Zealand	New Zealand
2017	16 September	North Harbour Stadium, Albany	New Zealand	57–0	South Africa	New Zealand
2016	8 October	Kings Park Stadium, Durban	South Africa	15–57	New Zealand	New Zealand
2016	17 September	Rugby League Park, Christchurch	New Zealand	41–13	South Africa	New Zealand
2015	25 July	Ellis Park, Johannesburg	South Africa	20–27	New Zealand	New Zealand
2014	4 October	Ellis Park, Johannesburg	South Africa	27–25	New Zealand	New Zealand
2014	13 September	Wellington Regional Stadium, Wellington	New Zealand	14–10	South Africa	New Zealand
2013	5 October	Ellis Park, Johannesburg	South Africa	27–38	New Zealand	New Zealand
2013	14 September	Eden Park, Auckland	New Zealand	29–15	South Africa	New Zealand
2012	6 October	FNB Stadium, Johannesburg	South Africa	16–32	New Zealand	New Zealand
2012	15 September	Forsyth Barr Stadium, Dunedin	New Zealand	21–11	South Africa	New Zealand
2011	20 August	Nelson Mandela Bay Stadium, Port Elizabeth	South Africa	18–5	New Zealand	New Zealand
2011	30 July	Wellington Regional Stadium, Wellington	New Zealand	40–7	South Africa	New Zealand
2010	21 August	FNB Stadium, Johannesburg	South Africa	22–29	New Zealand	New Zealand
2010	17 July	Wellington Regional Stadium, Wellington	New Zealand	31–17	South Africa	New Zealand
2010	10 July	Eden Park, Auckland	New Zealand	32–12	South Africa	New Zealand
2009	12 September	Waikato Stadium, Hamilton	New Zealand	29–32	South Africa	South Africa
2009	1 August	Kings Park Stadium, Durban	South Africa	31–19	New Zealand	South Africa
2009	25 July	Free State Stadium, Bloemfontein	South Africa	28–19	New Zealand	South Africa
2008	16 August	Newlands, Cape Town	South Africa	0–19	New Zealand	New Zealand
2008	12 July	Carisbrook, Dunedin	New Zealand	28–30	South Africa	New Zealand
2008	5 July	Wellington Regional Stadium, Wellington	New Zealand	19–8	South Africa	New Zealand
2007	14 July	Lancaster Park, Christchurch	New Zealand	33–6	South Africa	New Zealand
2007	23 June	Kings Park Stadium, Durban	South Africa	21–26	New Zealand	New Zealand
2006	2 September	Royal Bafokeng Stadium, Rustenburg	South Africa	21–20	New Zealand	New Zealand
2006	26 August	Loftus Versfeld, Pretoria	South Africa	26–45	New Zealand	New Zealand
2006	22 July	Wellington Regional Stadium, Wellington	New Zealand	35–17	South Africa	New Zealand
2004	14 August	Ellis Park, Johannesburg	South Africa	40–26	New Zealand	South Africa

== See also ==
- History of rugby union matches between New Zealand and South Africa
