= Siale Lauaki =

New Zealand rugby union player

- Born: 30 May 2003 (age 23) New Zealand
- Height: 194 cm (6 ft 4 in)
- Weight: 125 kg (276 lb; 19 st 10 lb)
- School: St Patrick's College, Wellington

Rugby union career
- Position: Prop
- Current team: Hurricanes, Wellington
Senior career
Years	Team	Apps	(Points)
2022–	Wellington	34	(20)
2024–	Hurricanes	17	(5)
- Correct as of 16 July 2026
International career
Years	Team	Apps	(Points)
2023	New Zealand U20	5	(0)
2025	All Blacks XV	3	(0)
2026-	New Zealand	1	(0)
- Correct as of 9 August 2026

Siale Lauaki (born 30 May 2003) is a New Zealand rugby union player, who plays for the Hurricanes and Wellington. His preferred position is prop.

== Early career ==
Lauaki attended St Patrick's College, Wellington where he was named College Sport Wellington Sportsman of the year, following being named in the New Zealand Schools side. He was selected for the New Zealand U20s in 2023.

== Professional career ==
Lauaki has represented Wellington in the National Provincial Championship since 2022, being named in their full squad for the 2023 Bunnings NPC. He was named in the Hurricanes squad for the 2024 Super Rugby Pacific season.

In 2026, Lauaki formed part of the Hurricanes squad which won the 2026 Super Rugby Pacific season. On 20 June, the Hurricanes defeated the Chiefs 60–5 in the final.

Off the back of Lauaki's performance in the 2026 Super Rugby Pacific season, Lauaki was named in the All-Blacks Greatest Rivalry tour of South Africa as a part of the extended 44-man squad. On 8 August, 2026, Lauaki made his All Blacks debut against the Stormers at DHL Stadium, Cape Town.
