= Cameron Hanekom =

South African rugby union player

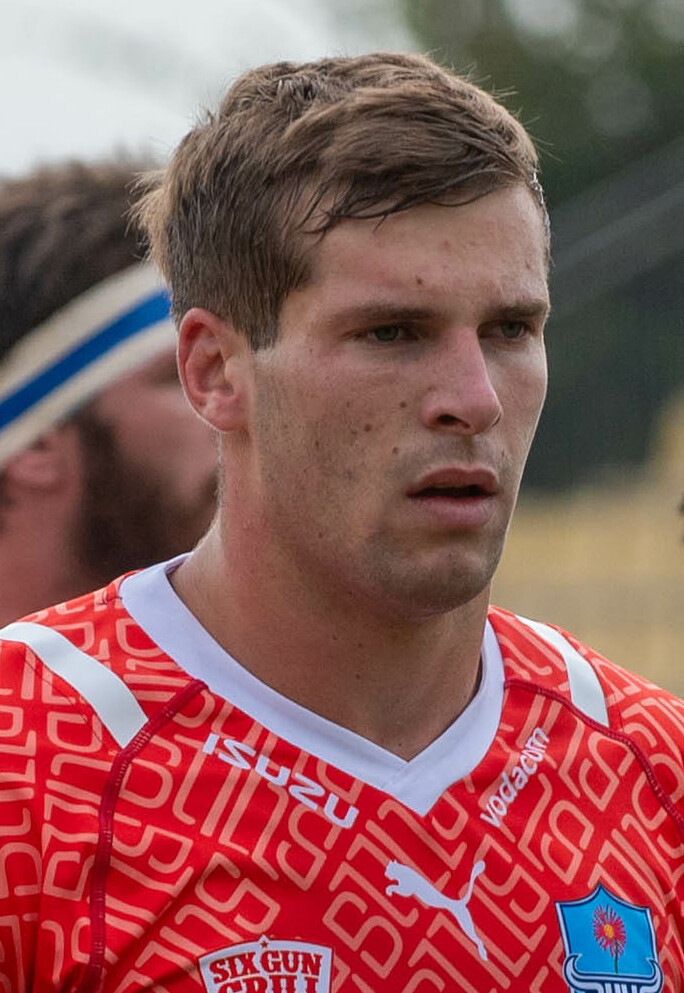
- Full name: Cameron Hanekom
- Born: 10 May 2002 (age 24) Ceres, South Africa
- Height: 193 cm (6 ft 4 in)
- Weight: 110 kg (243 lb)
- School: Paarl Boys' High School

Rugby union career
- Position(s): Flanker, Number 8
- Current team: Bulls / Blue Bulls
Senior career
Years	Team	Apps	(Points)
2022–	Blue Bulls	19	(20)
2022–	Bulls	58	(20)
- Correct as of 8 February 2025
International career
Years	Team	Apps	(Points)
2022	South Africa U20	0	(0)
2024-	South Africa	6	(10)
- Correct as of 14 September 2026

Cameron Hanekom (born 10 May 2002) is a South African professional rugby union player who currently plays for the Blue Bulls in the Currie Cup and Bulls in the United Rugby Championship. His regular position is Number eight.

Hanekom was named in the Blue Bulls side for the 2022 Currie Cup Premier Division. He made his Currie Cup debut for the Blue Bulls against the Free State Cheetahs in Round 2 of the 2022 Currie Cup Premier Division.

== Statistics ==
=== Test match record ===
As of 15 November 2026

Opponent	P	W	D	L	Try	Pts	%Won
Argentina	1	1	0	0	1	5	100
England	1	1	0	0	0	0	100
France	1	0	0	1	0	0	0
Italy	1	1	0	0	0	0	100
New Zealand	3	3	0	0	1	5	100
Wales	1	1	0	0	0	0	100
Total	8	7	0	1	2	10	87.5

=== International tries ===
As of 13 September 2026

Try	Opposing team	Location	Venue	Competition	Date	Result	Score
1	Argentina	Buenos Aires, Argentina	José Amalfitani Stadium	2026 test match	8 August 2026	Win	10–17
2	New Zealand	Baltimore, United States	M&T Bank Stadium	2026 New Zealand tour of South Africa	12 September 2026	Win	43–28

== Honours ==
- Named in the 2023–24 United Rugby Championship Elite XV team
- Man of the match against Argentina on 8 August 2026
