= Cam Roigard =

New Zealand rugby union player

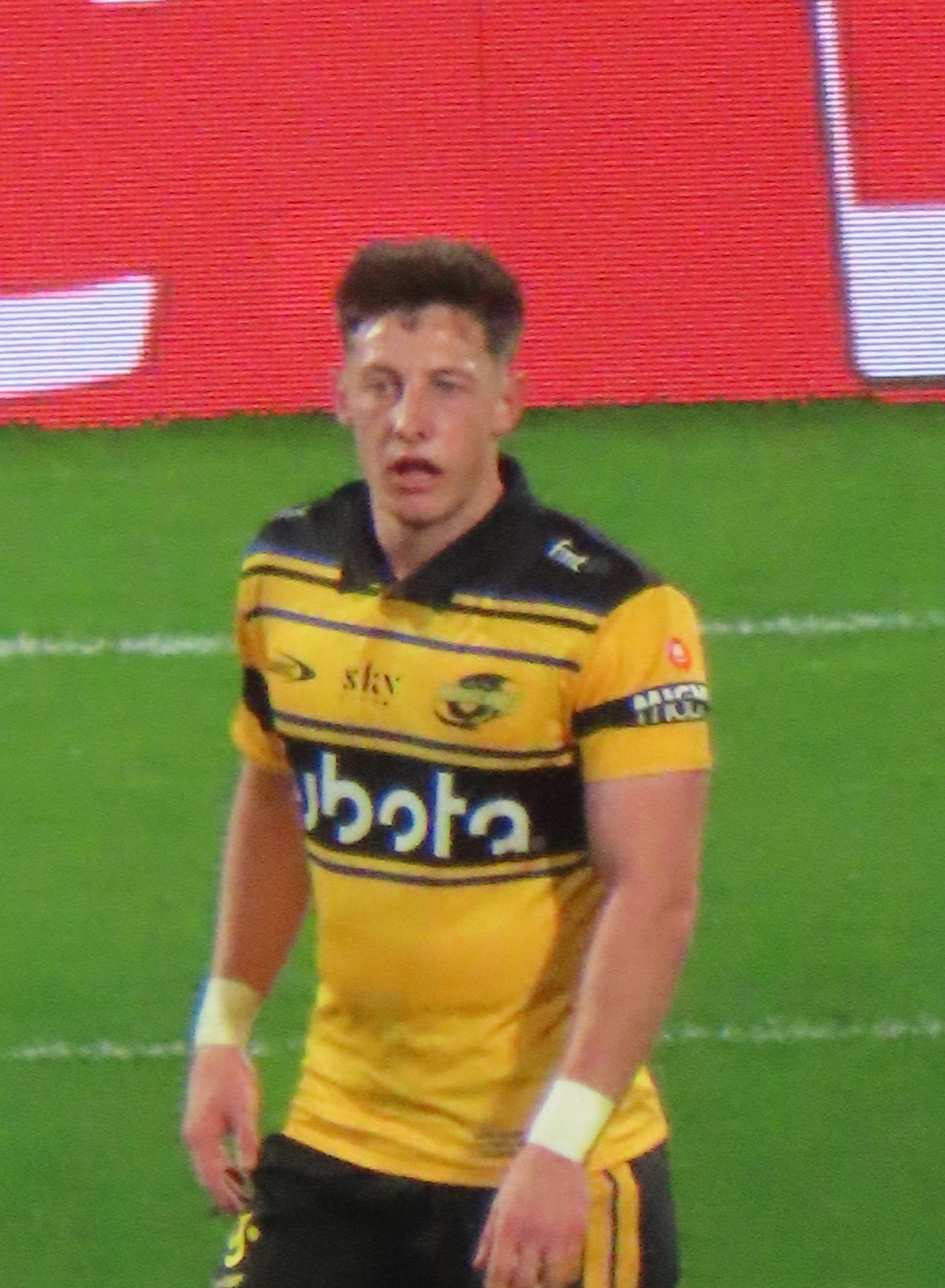
- Roigard playing for the Hurricanes in the 2026 Super Rugby Pacific final
- Full name: Cameron Roigard
- Born: 16 November 2000 (age 26) Hamilton, New Zealand
- Height: 1.83 m (6 ft 0 in)
- Weight: 88 kg (194 lb; 13 st 12 lb)
- School: St. Peter's School

Rugby union career
- Position: Half-back
- Current team: Counties Manukau, Hurricanes
Senior career
Years	Team	Apps	(Points)
2020–	Counties Manukau	20	(42)
2021–	Hurricanes	61	(140)
- Correct as of 23 June 2026
International career
Years	Team	Apps	(Points)
2022	All Blacks XV	1	(0)
2023–	New Zealand	28	(85)
- Correct as of 21 November 2026

Cameron Roigard (born 16 November 2000) is a New Zealand rugby union player who plays as a halfback for the Hurricanes in Super Rugby, Counties Manukau in the National Provincial Championship, and the All Blacks in international rugby union.

== Club career ==
Roigard made his debut for the Hurricanes squad as a late replacement in the side for Round 7 of the 2021 Super Rugby Aotearoa season. He was given his first full-time contract with the Hurricanes in their 2022 squad and in 2023 he was their joint top try scorer, with nine tries in 14 games.

Roigard tore his left patella tendon in March 2024 during a Round 6 game against the Highlanders, putting an end to his 2024 Super Rugby season.

He has also represented Counties Manukau Steelers in the National Provincial Championship since 2020. In 2022 he was named the Steelers' Player of the Year, as well as the Players' Player of the Year and the Defensive Player of the Year.

In 2026, Roigard formed part of the Hurricanes squad which won the 2026 Super Rugby Pacific season. On 20 June, the Hurricanes defeated the Chiefs 60–5 in the final.

During the 2026 semi-final against the Blues in June, Roigard remained on the ground following an aerial collision before quickly rising to take a fast tap, a passage of play that led to a Hurricanes try and drew mixed reaction from commentators, with some calling it clever play and others questioning its honesty.

== International career ==
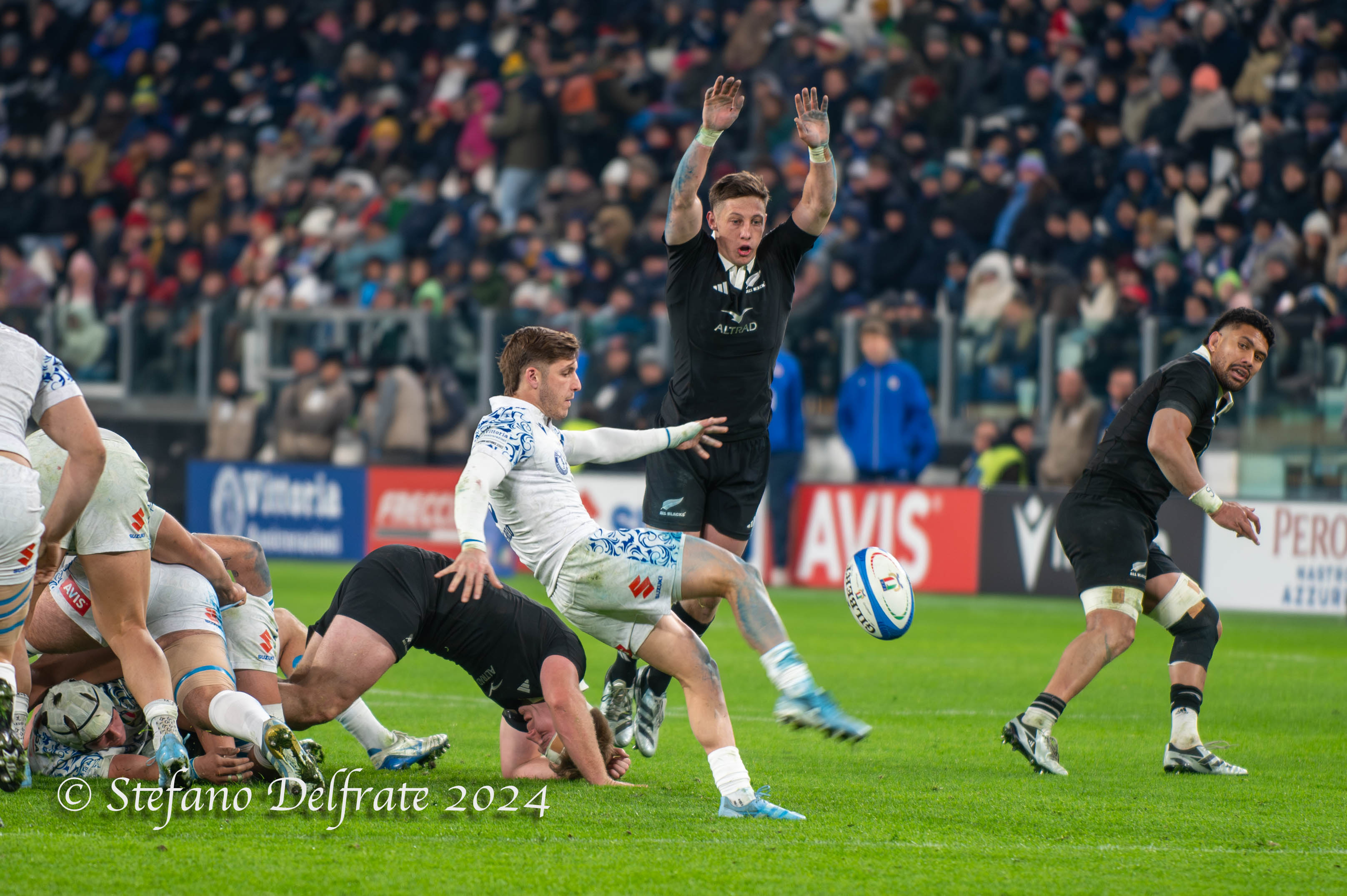
Roigard attempting to block a box kick against Italy in November 2024.

Roigard was named in the All Blacks XV Northern Tour squad in 2022, and debuted off the bench against Ireland A on 5 November 2022.

Roigard made his international debut for the All Blacks against the Wallabies on 29 July 2023 in Melbourne. He was named in the All Blacks' 2023 Rugby World Cup squad and made his World Cup debut against Namibia, also featuring against Uruguay and Italy in the tournament. He made a return to the All Blacks post-injury in November 2024 for their Northern Tour playing four tests.

During the third Rugby's Greatest Rivalry test against South Africa in Soweto in September 2026, after a penalty try had been awarded to the Springboks, Roigard grabbed hold of Springbok scrumhalf Cobus Reinach, who responded by flipping him over; Roigard then fell to the ground clutching his head, despite television replays showing no head contact, resulting in a penalty restart for New Zealand and public criticism.

== Personal life ==
Roigard is a former dirt track and speedway racer.
