= Morné van den Berg =

South African rugby union player

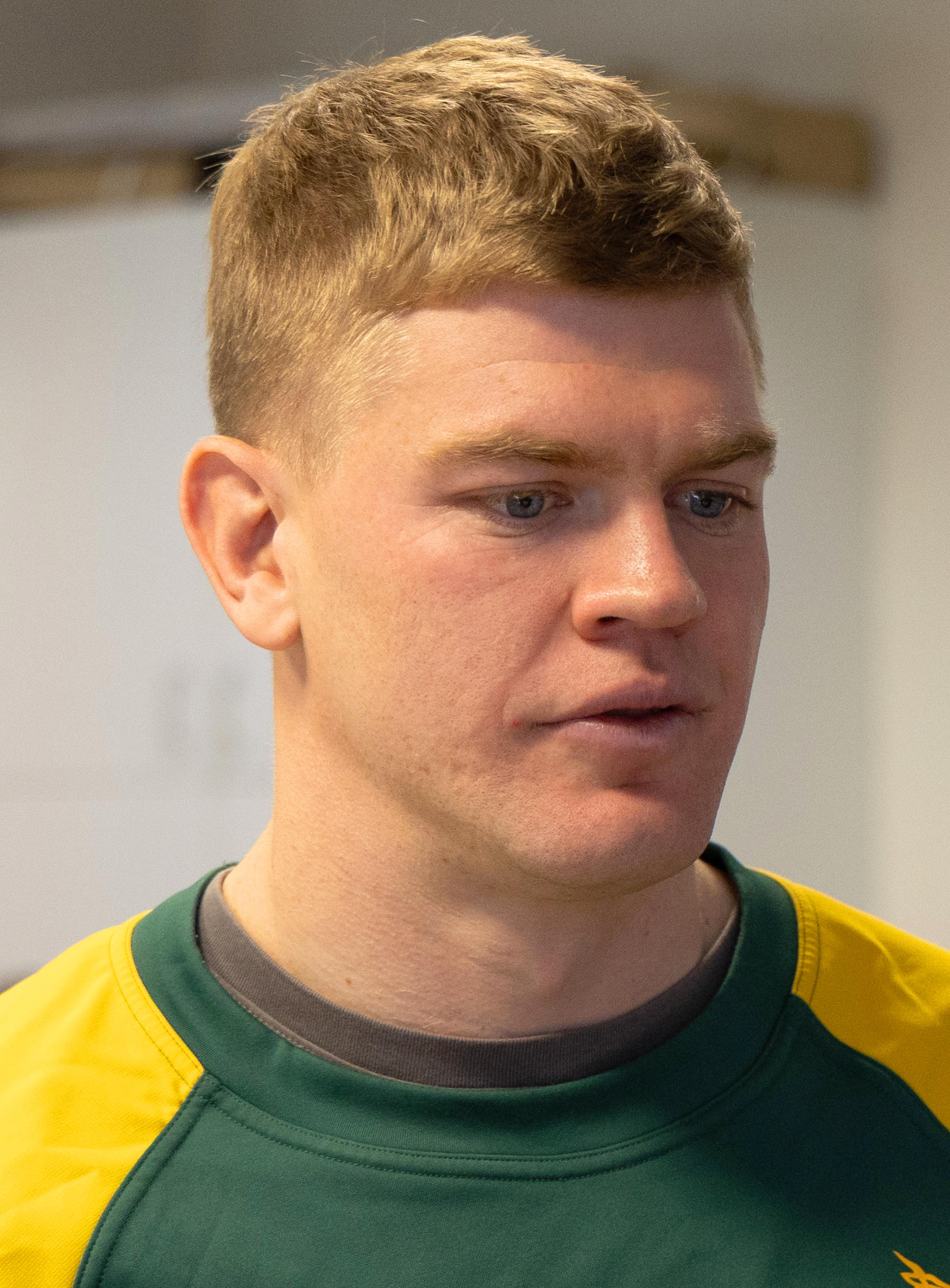
- Born: 24 October 1997 (age 29) Johannesburg, South Africa
- Height: 1.75 m (5 ft 9 in)
- Weight: 75 kg (165 lb; 11 st 11 lb)
- School: Hoërskool Linden

Rugby union career
- Position: Scrum-half
- Current team: Lions / Golden Lions
Youth career
- 2013–2018: Golden Lions
Senior career
Years	Team	Apps	(Points)
2017–2019	Golden Lions XV	6	(15)
2017–present	Golden Lions	24	(25)
2020–present	Lions	105	(112)
- Correct as of 4 November 2026
International career
Years	Team	Apps	(Points)
2024–	South Africa	11	(37)
- Correct as of 4 November 2026

Morné van den Berg (born 24 October 1997) is a South African rugby union player for the Lions in the United Rugby Championship and the Golden Lions in the Currie Cup. His regular position is scrum-half.

== Honours ==
South Africa

- 2025 Rugby Championship winner

== International statistics ==
=== Test Match record ===
As of 15 November 2026

Against	P	W	D	L	Try	Pts	%Won
Argentina	2	2	0	0	1	5	100
Australia	2	1	0	1	1	5	50
France	1	0	0	1	0	0	0
Italy	3	3	0	0	4	20	100
New Zealand	3	3	0	0	1	7	100
Portugal	1	1	0	0	0	0	100
Wales	1	1	0	0	1	5	100
Total	13	11	0	2	8	42	84.62

Pld = Games Played, W = Games Won, D = Games Drawn, L = Games Lost, Tri = Tries Scored, Pts = Points Scored

=== International tries ===
As of 8 November 2025

Try	Opposing team	Location	Venue	Competition	Date	Result	Score
1	Italy	Pretoria, South Africa	Loftus Versfeld Stadium	2025 Italy tour of South Africa	5 July 2025	Win	42–24
2	Italy	Pretoria, South Africa	Loftus Versfeld Stadium	2025 Italy tour of South Africa	5 July 2025	Win	42–24
3	Argentina	Durban, South Africa	Kings Park Stadium	2025 Rugby Championship	27 September 2025	Win	67–30
4	Italy	Turin, Italy	Juventus Stadium	2025 end-of-year test	15 November 2025	Win	14–32
5	Wales	Cardiff, Wales	Millennium Stadium	2025 end-of-year test	29 November 2025	Win	0–73
6	New Zealand	Baltimore, United States	M&T Bank Stadium	2026 New Zealand tour of South Africa	12 September 2026	Win	43–28
7	Australia	Perth, Australia	Perth Stadium	2026 test	27 September 2026	Loss	42–38
8	Italy	Turin, Italy	Juventus Stadium	2026 Nations Championship	7 November 2026	Win	7–66
