= 2026 Super Rugby Pacific final =

Men's rugby union club competition

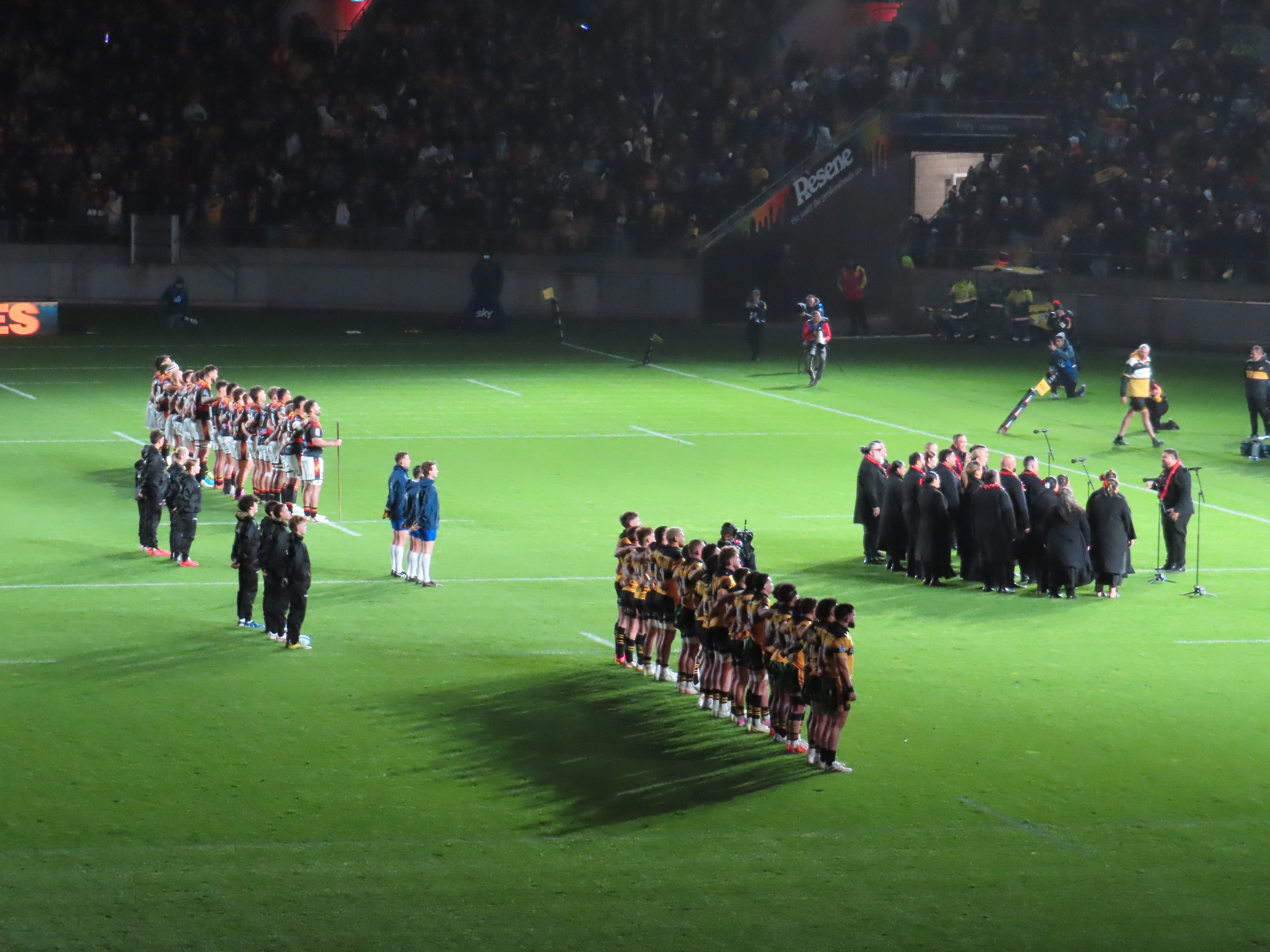
- Pre-match lineup
- Event: 2026 Super Rugby Pacific season
Hurricanes	Chiefs
60	5
- Match details
- Date: 20 June 2026
- Venue: Hnry Stadium, Wellington
- Man of the Match: Ruben Love (Hurricanes)
- Referee: Nic Berry (Australia)
- Attendance: 34,500
- Weather: Clear night 15 °C (59 °F); 85% humidity

The 2026 Super Rugby Pacific final, stylised as the 2026 Super Rugby Pacific Grand Final, was the final match of the 2026 Super Rugby Pacific season and the decider of the Finals Series, the 31st season of the Southern Hemisphere's premier rugby union competition organised by SANZAAR. The 31st Super Rugby final, and the ninth all-New Zealand final, it was played on 20 June 2026 at Hnry Stadium, Wellington.

The Hurricanes won their second Super Rugby title after defeating the Chiefs 60–5, a record margin in a Grand Final. The final score surpassed the Bulls 61–17 result against the Chiefs in the 2009 final. Alongside the record-breaking victory in the final, tries from the Hurricanes' Fehi Fineanganofo and Josh Moorby saw both players equal the Super Rugby try-scoring record in a season, finishing the campaign with 17 tries apiece.

== Background ==
The Hurricanes secured their fourth Super Rugby final appearance with a commanding 57–21 victory over arch-rivals the Blues in the semi-final. It marks their first appearance in the championship decider since the 2016 season, a campaign that, like 2026, saw them finish atop the regular season ladder. During their run to the final, the Hurricanes became the first side in Super Rugby history to score more than 100 tries in a single season, while their tally of 685 points also established a new competition record. Head coach Clark Laidlaw was seeking his first championship title with the Hurricanes. He had previously served as an assistant coach during the club's 2015 season, when the Hurricanes reached the final but suffered a home defeat to the Highlanders. Ahead of the match, Laidlaw remarked that despite finishing atop the league standings and earning home-ground advantage, his side entered the contest as underdogs, citing the Chiefs' three consecutive appearances in the Super Rugby final as evidence of their quality in the competition's knockout matches.

The Chiefs secured their seventh Super Rugby final appearance, following their Semi-final victory against the Crusaders. Going into the semi-final, the Chiefs had lost their last three matches against the Crusaders, including a 33–43 defeat at home earlier in the season, and lost their last five finals encounters against the Christchurch-based team. However, they had been in strong form in the lead up to the match, and had won nine of their last ten fixtures, scoring more than 45 points in each of their previous two games. With this victory, they moved into second place for all-time final appearances in the competition, trailing only the Crusaders and overtaking both the Auckland-based Blues and Canberra-based Brumbies, who had previously shared the mark with six appearances each. This also doubled as their fourth consecutive Super Rugby final, a streak only beaten by the Crusaders' seven. They previously won two finals (2012, 2013) and lost four (2009, 2023, 2024, 2025). Coach Jono Gibbes achieved his first Super Rugby final appearance as coach of the Chiefs in his first season in the role (a feat most recently achieved by Vern Cotter in 2024).

In Super Rugby, the Chiefs have won seven of their last ten matches against the Hurricanes, including a 22–17 extra-time victory in Round 10 earlier in the season, and a 30–19 win in the 2024 Super Rugby semi-final. The final will also be the fifth finals meeting between the Hurricanes and Chiefs; the previous four finals encounters were split evenly at two wins each. Despite this, it is the first time they have met in a Super Rugby Grand Final.

Head-to-Head record
Team	Wins	W%
Hurricanes	24	50
Chiefs	22	45.83
Draws	2	4.17
Total	48	

=== Venue ===
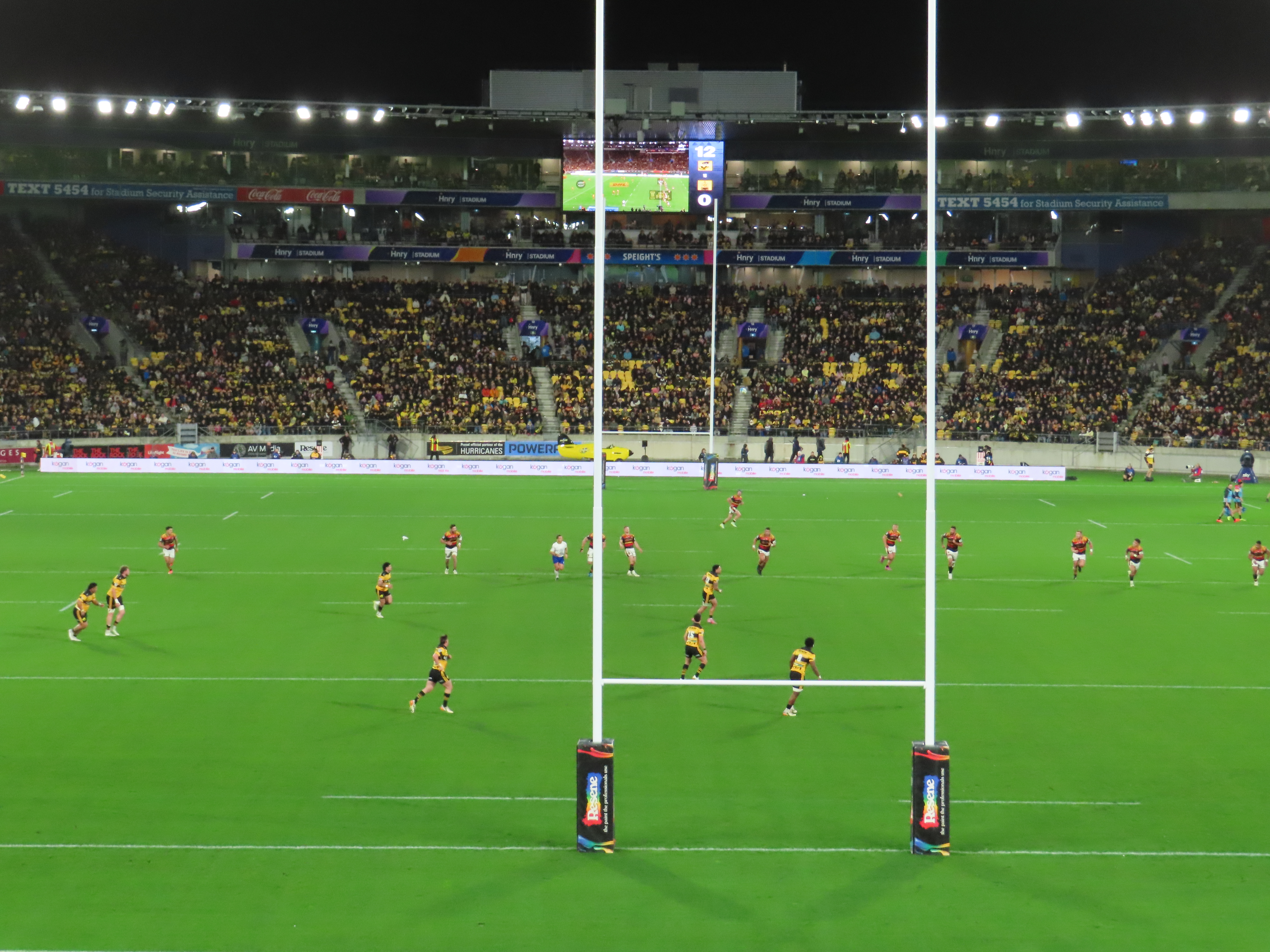
Hnry Stadium shortly after kickoff.

The Grand Final was hosted by Hnry Stadium, Wellington (Wellington Regional Stadium), the home ground of the Hurricanes. Having finished atop the standings, the Hurricanes earned the right to host the final. It marked Wellington's first Super Rugby final since 2016, when the Hurricanes last hosted the decider against the Lions of Johannesburg.

The Super Rugby Finals Series remained consistent between 2025 and 2026, with both seasons featuring a six-team playoff system. The key difference between the two was in how the "lucky loser" was treated. In 2025, the team dropped only one seeding, meaning it could still retain relatively favourable positioning and, home advantage in later rounds. As in last season's grand final, the Chiefs, whom finished first on the season ladder, were not designated hosts as they had lost their Qualifying final to the sixth-placed Blues, thus losing one seeding rank going into the Semi-finals.

In 2026, this was tightened significantly. The "lucky loser" was now automatically placed as fourth seed, removing any possibility of hosting a Semi-final or Grand Final. As a result, any team progressing after a first-week defeat must play all remaining Finals matches away from home, reinforcing a clearer separation between winners and losers in the knockout phase. However, none of this was applicable for the 2026 final as both first and second-placed teams in the competition did not lose any finals matches.

On 16 June, tickets formally went on sale for the Super Rugby final at Hnry Stadium. Within 15 minutes, all tickets for the 34,500-capacity stadium were sold.

=== Previous finals ===
Team	Previous final appearances (bold indicates winners)
Hurricanes	3 (2006, 2015, **2016**)
Chiefs	6 (2009, **2012**, **2013**, 2023, 2024, 2025)

== Route to the final ==
Note: In all results below, the score of the finalist is given first (H: home; A: away).

Hurricanes		Round	Chiefs	
Competition
Pos / Team / Pld / W / D / L / PF / PA / PD / TF / TA / TB / LB / Pts; 1 / Hurricanes / 14 / 11 / 0 / 3 / 562 / 298 / +264 / 86 / 44 / 9 / 2 / 55; 2 / Chiefs / 14 / 11 / 0 / 3 / 515 / 325 / +190 / 75 / 49 / 6 / 1 / 51; 3 / Crusaders / 14 / 8 / 0 / 6 / 488 / 388 / +100 / 73 / 55 / 5 / 4 / 41; 4 / Blues / 14 / 8 / 0 / 6 / 456 / 412 / +44 / 68 / 60 / 4 / 2 / 38; 5 / Reds / 14 / 8 / 0 / 6 / 364 / 386 / −22 / 53 / 56 / 3 / 2 / 37; 6 / Brumbies / 14 / 7 / 0 / 7 / 402 / 373 / +29 / 60 / 48 / 2 / 4 / 34
Opponent	Result	Finals	Opponent	Result
Brumbies (H)	66–12	Qualifying finals	Reds (H)	46–24
Blues (H)	57–21	Semi-finals	Crusaders (H)	49–12

== Match ==
20 June 2026
19:05 NZST (UTC+12)

Hurricanes	60–5	Chiefs
Try: Josh Moorby (2) 7', 44'; Ruben Love (2) 14', 67'; Fehi Fineanganofo 24'; Callum Harkin 38'; Devan Flanders 48'; Jordie Barrett 54'; Jone Rova 78'; Con: Ruben Love (6/9) 15', 25', 39', 45', 55', 79'; Pen: Ruben Love (1/1) 40+2'	Report	Try: Naitoa Ah Kuoi 75'

Hnry Stadium, Wellington
Attendance: 33,022
Referee: Nic Berry (Australia)

Hurricanes	Chiefs

FB	15	Callum Harkin	(substituted off) 58'
RW	14	Josh Moorby
OC	13	Billy Proctor
IC	12	Jordie Barrett (cc)	(substituted off) 68'
LW	11	Fehi Fineanganofo
FH	10	Ruben Love
SH	9	Cam Roigard	(substituted off) 64'
N8	8	Peter Lakai
OF	7	Du'Plessis Kirifi (cc)
BF	6	Devan Flanders	(substituted off) 55'
RL	5	Warner Dearns	(substituted off) 55'
LL	4	Isaia Walker-Leawere
TP	3	Pasilio Tosi	(substituted off) 50'
HK	2	Asafo Aumua	(substituted off) 66'
LP	1	Xavier Numia	(substituted off) 58'
Substitutes:
HK	16	Jacob Devery	(substituted on) 66'
PR	17	Siale Lauaki	(substituted on) 58'
PR	18	Tyrel Lomax	(substituted on) 50'
LF	19	Brad Shields	(substituted on) 55'
LF	20	Brayden Iose	(substituted on) 55'
SH	21	Ere Enari	(substituted on) 64'
CE	22	Jone Rova	(substituted on) 68'
WG	23	Kini Naholo	(substituted on) 58'
Coach:
Clark Laidlaw

FB	15	Liam Coombes-Fabling
RW	14	Leroy Carter
OC	13	Kyle Brown	(substituted off) 50'
IC	12	Quinn Tupaea
LW	11	Kyren Taumoefolau	(substituted off) 50'
FH	10	Damian McKenzie
SH	9	Cortez Ratima	(substituted off) 55'
N8	8	Simon Parker	(substituted off) 63'
OF	7	Luke Jacobson (c)
BF	6	Samipeni Finau	(substituted off) 66'
RL	5	Tupou Vaa'i	(substituted off) 46'
LL	4	Josh Lord
TP	3	Sione Ahio	(substituted off) 23'
HK	2	Samisoni Taukei'aho	(substituted off) 55'
LP	1	Ollie Norris	(substituted off) 50'
Substitutes:
HK	16	Brodie McAlister	(substituted on) 55'
PR	17	Jared Proffit	(substituted on) 50'
PR	18	George Dyer	(substituted on) 23'
LK	19	Naitoa Ah Kuoi	(substituted on) 46'
LF	20	Kaylum Boshier	(substituted on) 63'
SH	21	Xavier Roe	(substituted on) 55'
FH	22	Josh Jacomb	(substituted on) 50'
CE	23	Reon Paul	(substituted on) 50'
Coach:
Jono Gibbes

Man of the Match:
Ruben Love (Hurricanes)
Assistant referees:
Reuben Keane (Australia)
Louis Trisley (Australia)
Television match official:
Brett Cronan (Australia)

=== Statistics ===
Overall
Statistic	Hurricanes	Chiefs
Tries scored	9	1
Possession	57%	43%
Territory	59%	41%
Kicks	22	16
Carries	170	123
Metres carried	761	456
Tackles	166	193
Tackles missed	31	54
Tackle success	84%	78%
Offloads	22	3
Penalties conceded	8	4
Lineouts won	3/5 (60%)	4/7 (57%)
Scrums won	12 (100%)	7 (100%)

== Gallery ==
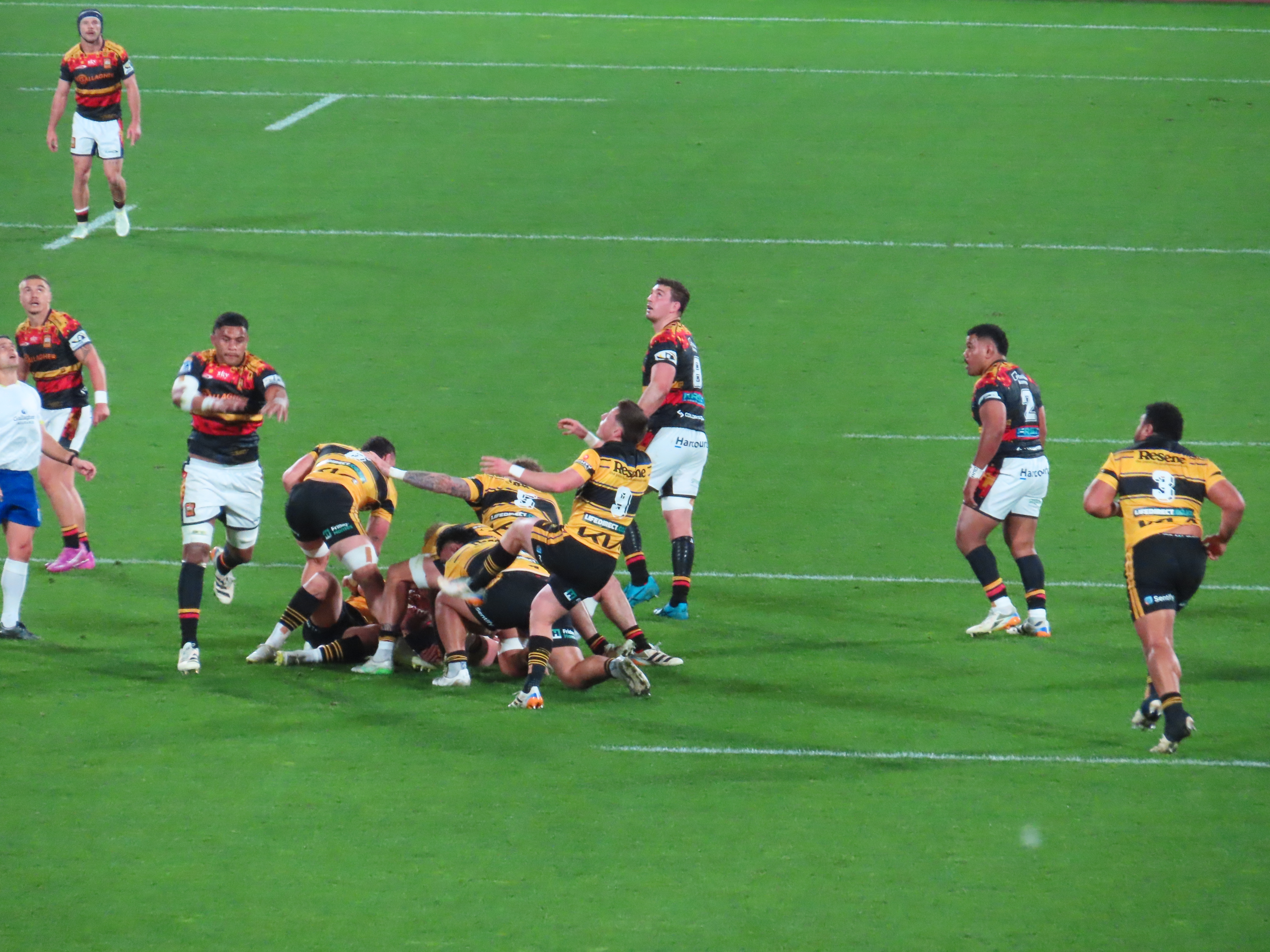
Cam Roigard performing a box kick

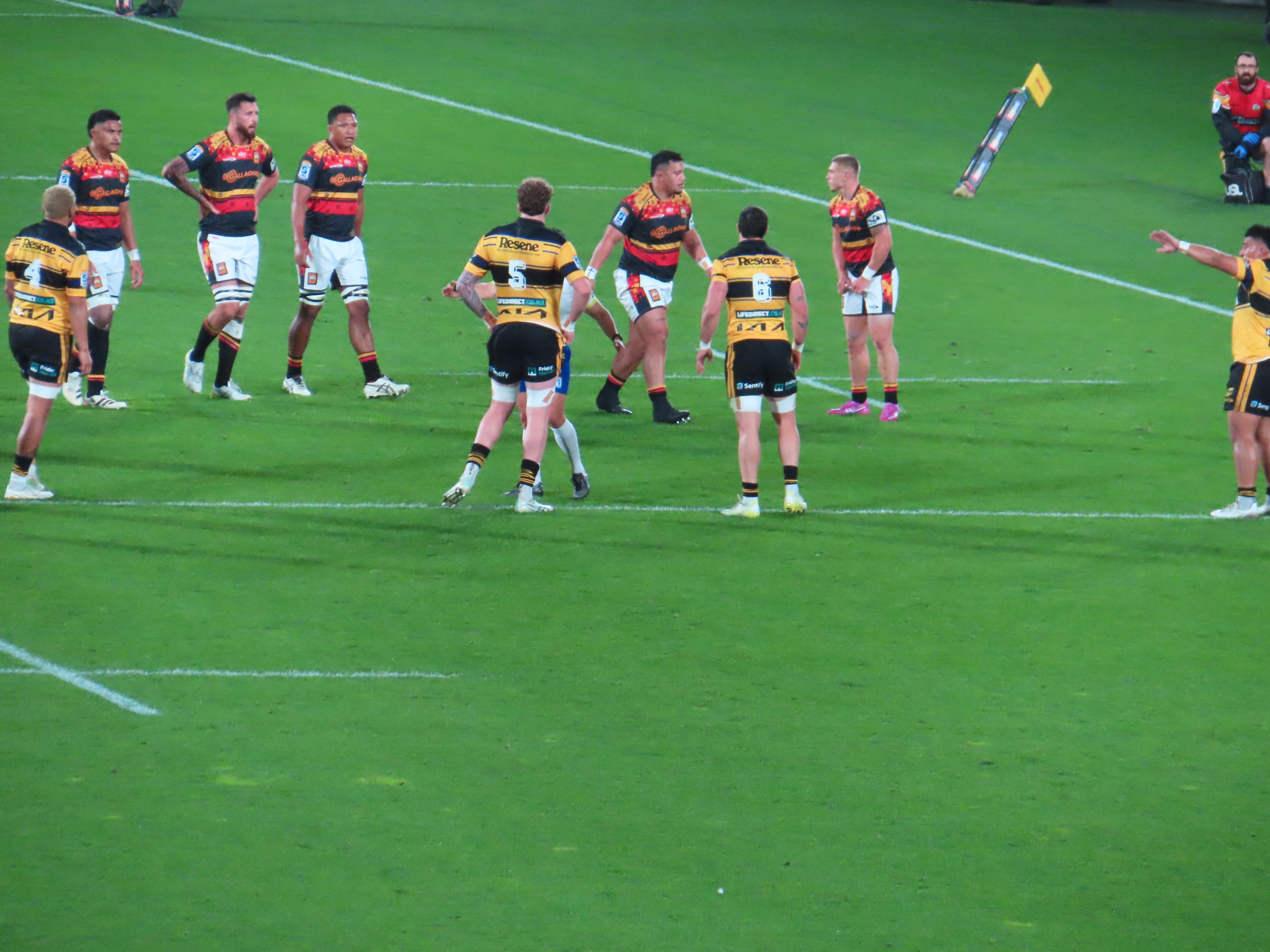
Chiefs players preparing for a lineout

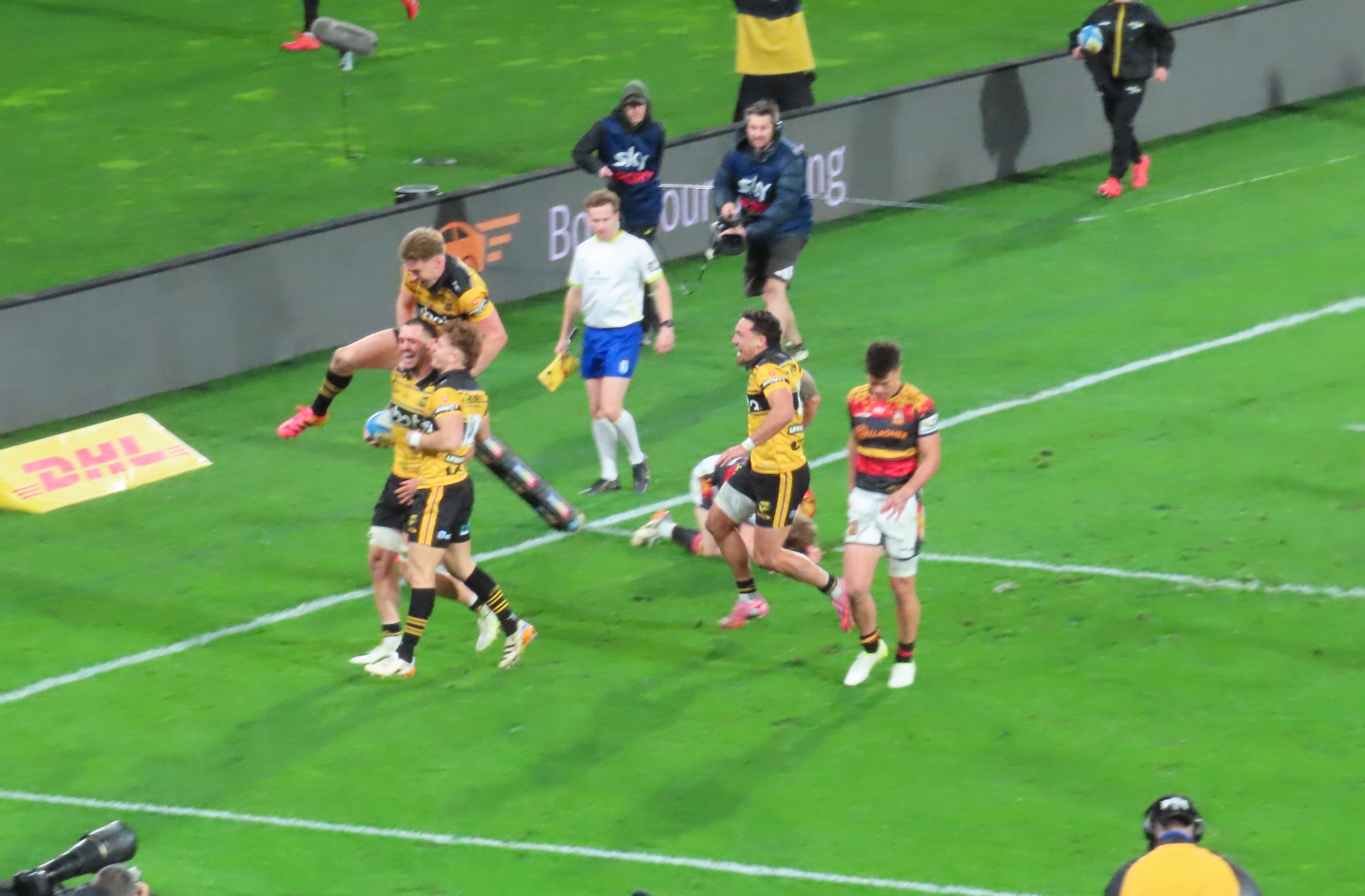
Devan Flanders scoring the Hurricanes' sixth try

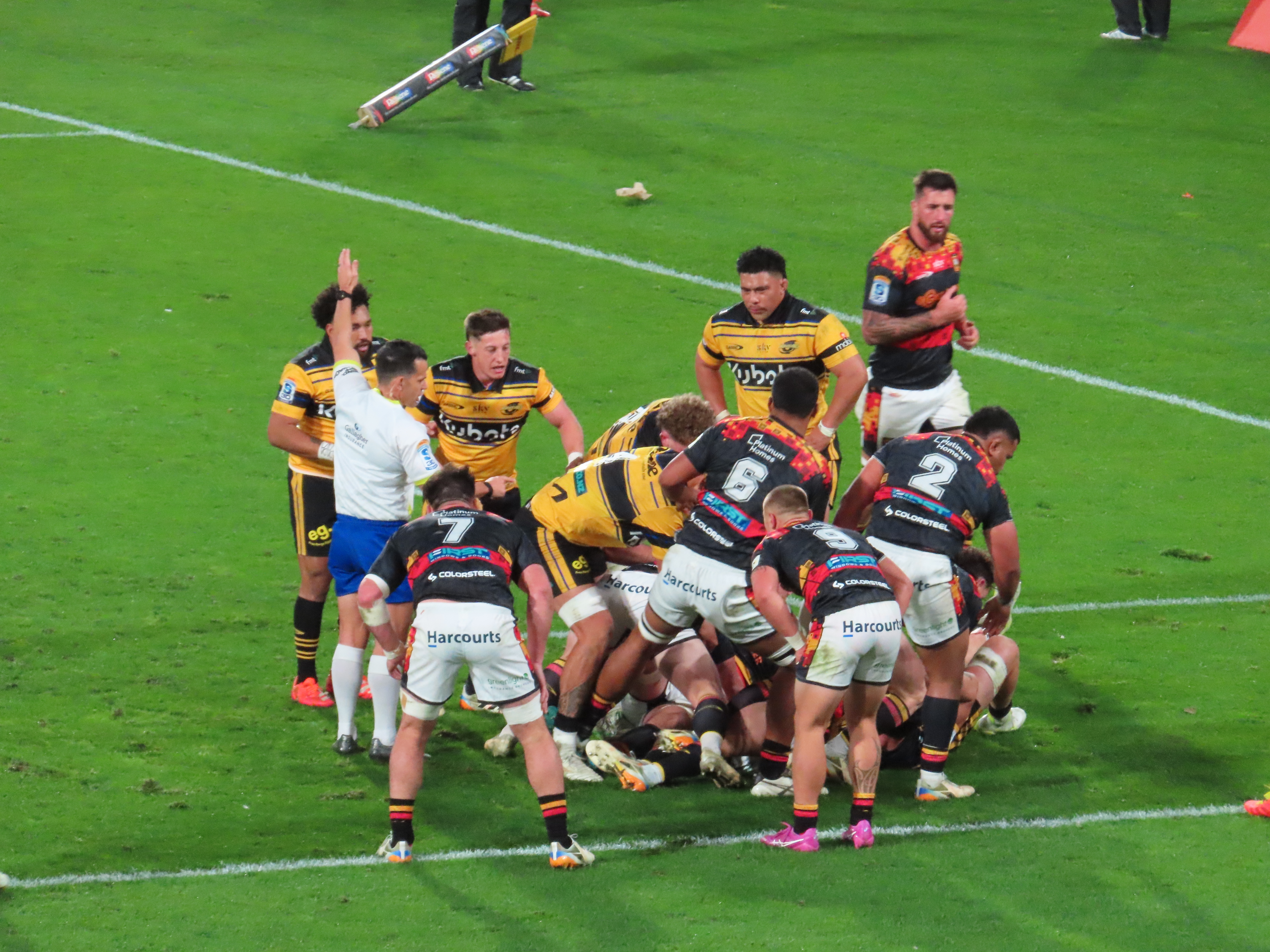
Players following a scrum

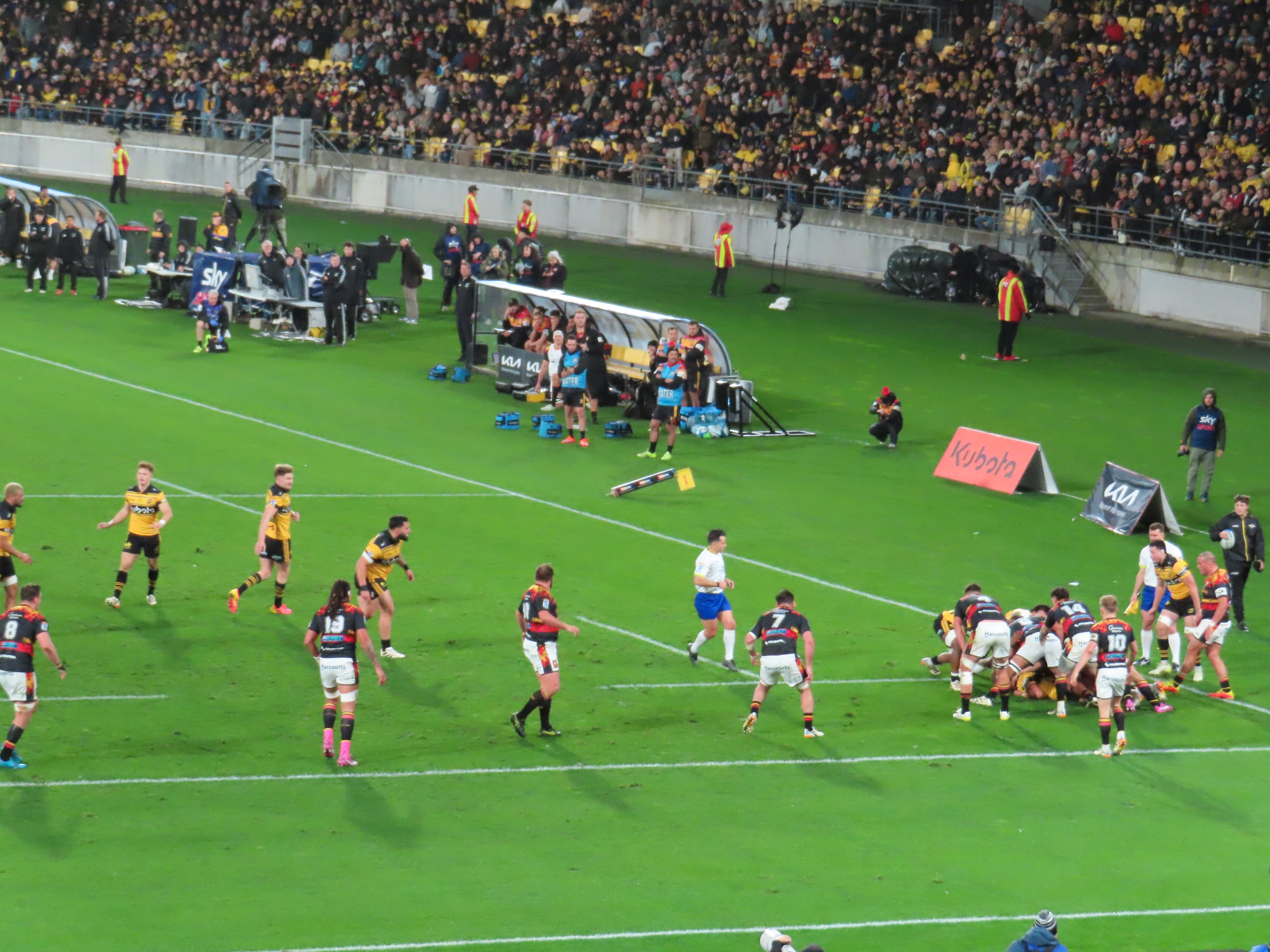
The Hurricanes near the Chiefs' try line

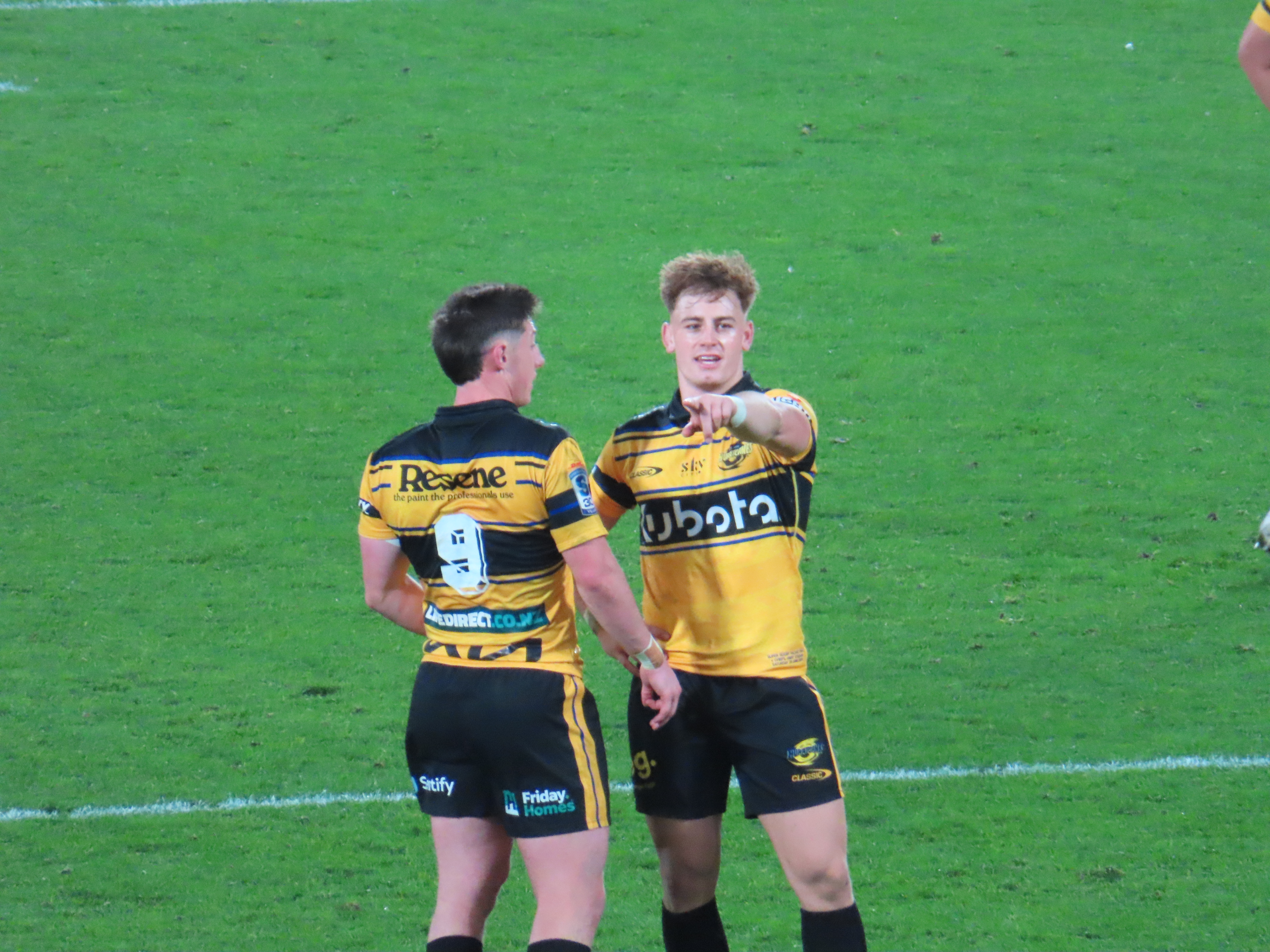
Roigard and Ruben Love

== See also ==
- 2026 United Rugby Championship Grand Final
