= Anton Segner =

German rugby union player

- Full name: Anton Segner
- Born: 24 July 2001 (age 25) Frankfurt, Germany
- Height: 192 cm (6 ft 4 in)
- Weight: 108 kg (238 lb; 17 st 0 lb)
- School: Nelson College

Rugby union career
- Position(s): Flanker, Number 8
- Current team: Auckland, Blues
Senior career
Years	Team	Apps	(Points)
2020–2023	Tasman	28	(15)
2022–	Blues	54	(20)
2024–	Auckland	17	(20)
- Correct as of 15 November 2026
International career
Years	Team	Apps	(Points)
2021	New Zealand U20	0	(0)
2026–	New Zealand	6	(0)
- Correct as of 21 November 2026

Anton Segner (born 24 July 2001) is a German-born New Zealand rugby union player, who plays as a loose forward for Auckland in the National Provincial Championship, the Blues in Super Rugby, and the All Blacks in international rugby.

== Early career ==
=== Germany ===
Before 2017, Segner played for SC 1880 Frankfurt, a traditional club in Germany's domestic Rugby-Bundesliga competition. He quickly established himself as one of the leading youths at the club and won numerous German youth championships. He also captained his team while one of the youngest members. Segner played for the Germany Under 16 national squad in 2016. He didn't play for the Under 18 team, as he was in New Zealand.

=== New Zealand ===
In 2017, Segner was on a six month stay in New Zealand – after being offered a scholarship by Nelson College – when he was picked for the school's first XV team, playing alongside Leicester Faingaʻanuku. He then went on to captain the Nelson College top side in 2018 and led them to their first UC Championship title in twelve years in 2019. In 2018, Segner made the Crusaders Under 18 squad and made his debut for the New Zealand Schools team against Tonga. In 2021, he was named captain of the Crusaders Under 20 side for the Super Rugby Aotearoa Under 20 competition.

== Senior career ==
At just 19 years of age, Segner was named in the Tasman Mako squad for the 2020 Mitre 10 Cup, signing a two year deal with the province. He made his debut for the Mako in Round 7 against Southland in a 47–10 win for the side at Trafalgar Park. Segner became the first German to win a Mitre 10 Cup title when Tasman won the 2020 Mitre 10 Cup, beating Auckland 12–13 in the final at Eden Park, with Segner coming off the bench in the second half. Segner had a stand out season during the 2021 Bunnings NPC as the Mako made the Premiership final before losing 23–20 to Waikato.

In October 2021, Segner signed a three year deal with Super Rugby franchise the Blues. He made his debut for the side in Round 2 of the 2022 Super Rugby Pacific season against the Hurricanes.

After four seasons playing for Tasman, Segner not only re-signed with the Blues for a further two seasons, he also decided to make Auckland his permanent home by signing with the Auckland NPC team for two years. He made his debut for the province on 9 August 2024 against Wellington.

== International career ==
In May 2021, Segner was named in the New Zealand Under 20 squad. However, due to the continuing impact of the COVID-19 pandemic, both the 2021 Oceania Rugby Under 20 Championship and World Rugby U20 Championship were cancelled. Instead, the team played a series of four matches on home soil, including one international match against the Cook Islands national team.

On 22 June 2026, Segner was named as a forward in the New Zealand national rugby union team, the All Blacks, for the first time. The naming of Segner to the team marks him as the first German player, and only the second player from continental Europe (after Dutch forward Fabian Holland), to be named in an All Blacks team. The team named, the first under new head coach Dave Rennie, is contesting the inaugural Nations Championship in July 2026 with test matches against France, Italy and Ireland.

On 9 July 2026, Segner was selected as a reserve forward in the All Blacks team to face Italy. In an interview in the days leading up to the match, Coach Rennie gave assurances that Segner would be given game time in the match, stating that Segner 'has been excellent [at training]'.

On 11 July 2026, Segner made his debut for the All Blacks, playing the entire second half of the match in the number 20 reserves jersey as the replacement for Luke Jacobson at the openside flanker position. Leading the match 14–10 at half time, New Zealand went on to defeat Italy 47–17.
