= Wallace Sititi =

New Zealand rugby union player

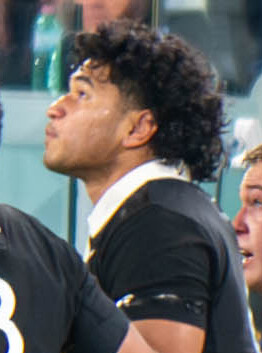
- Born: 7 September 2002 (age 24) Apia, Samoa
- Height: 1.87 m (6 ft 2 in)
- Weight: 113 kg (249 lb; 17 st 11 lb)
- School: De La Salle College
- Notable relative: Semo Sititi (father) Amarante Sititi (sister)

Rugby union career
- Position(s): Number 8, Flanker
- Current team: North Harbour, Chiefs
Senior career
Years	Team	Apps	(Points)
2022–	North Harbour	11	(5)
2024–	Chiefs	29	(40)
- Correct as of 17 October 2026
International career
Years	Team	Apps	(Points)
2022	New Zealand U20	2	(10)
2024–	New Zealand	28	(10)
- Correct as of 21 November 2026

Wallace Sititi (born 7 September 2002) is a Samoan-born New Zealand rugby union player who plays as a Number 8 for the Chiefs in Super Rugby and North Harbour in the National Provincial Championship. Born in Samoa, he represents New Zealand at international level after qualifying on residency grounds.

== Early life ==
Sititi was born in Samoa, but spent his first five years living in Scotland while his father Semo Sititi played for Border Reivers and Newcastle Falcons. He was named Wallace after the Scottish knight William Wallace, as his parents loved the film Braveheart. Sititi also lived in Osaka, Japan for seven years while his father played for NTT DoCoMo Red Hurricanes Osaka.

Sititi attended De La Salle College, Auckland, where he was deputy head boy and captained the First XV.

He played club rugby for Auckland Marist.

== Club career ==
Sititi has represented North Harbour in the National Provincial Championship since 2022, being named in their full squad for the 2023 Bunnings NPC. He was selected for the New Zealand U20s in 2022. He was named in the Chiefs squad for the 2024 Super Rugby Pacific season.

== International career ==
On 24 June 2024, Sititi was named in the first All Blacks squad of the year for the 2024 Steinlager Ultra Low Carb Series. On 20 July 2024, Sititi made his All Blacks debut as a replacement in the test match against Fiji played at Snapdragon Stadium in San Diego, California. Later that year, Sititi was named World Rugby Men's 15s Breakthrough Player of the Year at the World Rugby Awards, and won the All Blacks Player of the Year award at the 2024 ASB New Zealand Rugby Awards.
