= Pasilio Tosi =

New Zealand rugby union player

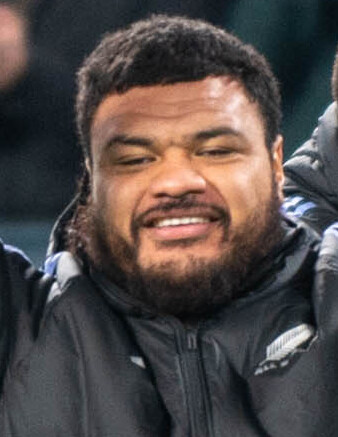
- Born: Viliami Pasilio Tosi; 18 July 1998 (age 28) Levin, New Zealand
- Height: 192 cm (6 ft 4 in)
- Weight: 138 kg (304 lb; 21 st 10 lb)
- School: Rotorua Boys' High School

Rugby union career
- Position(s): Prop, Number 8
- Current team: Bay of Plenty, Hurricanes
Senior career
Years	Team	Apps	(Points)
2018–2020	Southland	7	(0)
2021–	Bay of Plenty	28	(15)
2022–	Hurricanes	53	(25)
- Correct as of 17 October 2026
International career
Years	Team	Apps	(Points)
2024–	New Zealand	22	(5)
- Correct as of 21 November 2026

Viliami Pasilio Tosi (born 18 July 1998) is a New Zealand rugby union player who plays as a Prop for the Hurricanes in Super Rugby and Bay of Plenty in the National Provincial Championship. Tosi previously played as a loose forward for Southland before transitioning to prop.

== Club career ==
In 2026, Tosi formed part of the Hurricanes squad which won the 2026 Super Rugby Pacific season. On 20 June, the Hurricanes defeated the Chiefs 60–5 in the final.

== International career ==
On 24 June 2024, Tosi was named in the first All Blacks squad of the year for the 2024 Steinlager Ultra Low Carb Series. On 20 July 2024, he made his debut for New Zealand coming off the bench against Fiji.
