= Xavier Numia =

New Zealand rugby union player

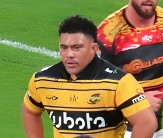
- Numia playing for the Hurricanes in the 2026 Super Rugby Pacific final
- Born: 29 November 1998 (age 27) Wellington, New Zealand
- Height: 189 cm (6 ft 2 in)
- Weight: 111 kg (245 lb; 17 st 7 lb)
- School: St Patrick's College, Wellington

Rugby union career
- Position: Prop
- Current team: Wellington, Hurricanes
Senior career
Years	Team	Apps	(Points)
2018–	Wellington	81	(45)
2019–	Hurricanes	92	(35)
- Correct as of 1 July 2026
International career
Years	Team	Apps	(Points)
2018	New Zealand U20	3	(0)
2023	All Blacks XV	5	(0)
2026	New Zealand	1	(0)
- Correct as of 1 July 2026

Xavier Numia (born 29 November 1998 in New Zealand) is a New Zealand rugby union player who plays for the Hurricanes in Super Rugby. His playing position is prop. He was named in the Hurricanes squad for week 1 in 2019.

== Club career ==
In 2026, Numia formed part of the Hurricanes squad which won the 2026 Super Rugby Pacific season. On 20 June, the Hurricanes defeated the Chiefs 60–5 in the final.
