= Ollie Norris =

New Zealand rugby union player

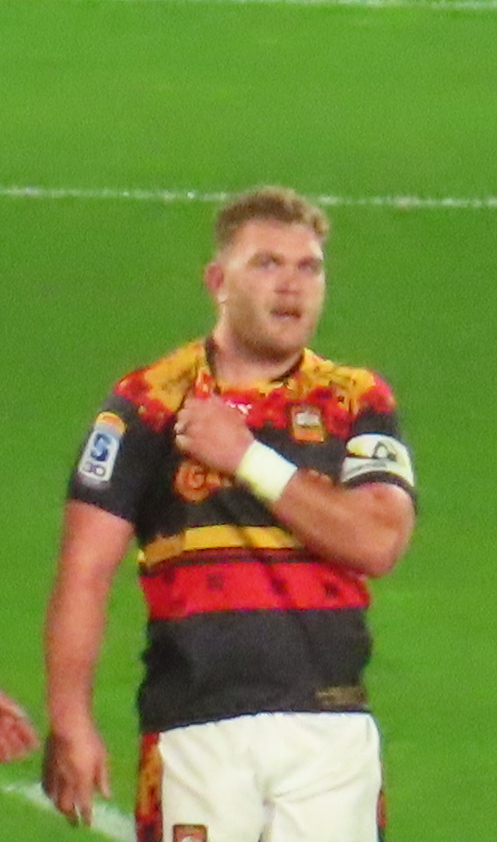
- Norris playing for the Chiefs in the 2026 Super Rugby Pacific final
- Full name: Oliver Norris
- Born: 11 December 1999 (age 26) Sydney, Australia
- Height: 195 cm (6 ft 5 in)
- Weight: 126 kg (278 lb; 19 st 12 lb)
- School: St. Peter's School
- Notable relative: Jacob Norris (brother)

Rugby union career
- Position: Prop
- Current team: Waikato, Chiefs
Senior career
Years	Team	Apps	(Points)
2019–	Waikato	40	(20)
2020–	Chiefs	68	(10)
- Correct as of 16 April 2023
International career
Years	Team	Apps	(Points)
2018–2019	New Zealand U20	8	(10)
2021–2022	Māori All Blacks	3	(0)
2025-	New Zealand	3	(0)
- Correct as of 16 July 2022

Ollie Norris (born 11 December 1999) is a New Zealand rugby union player who plays for the Chiefs in Super Rugby. His playing position is prop. He has signed for the Chiefs.

== Personal life ==
Norris is a New Zealander of Māori descent (Ngāpuhi descent).
