= Leroy Carter (rugby union) =

New Zealand rugby union player

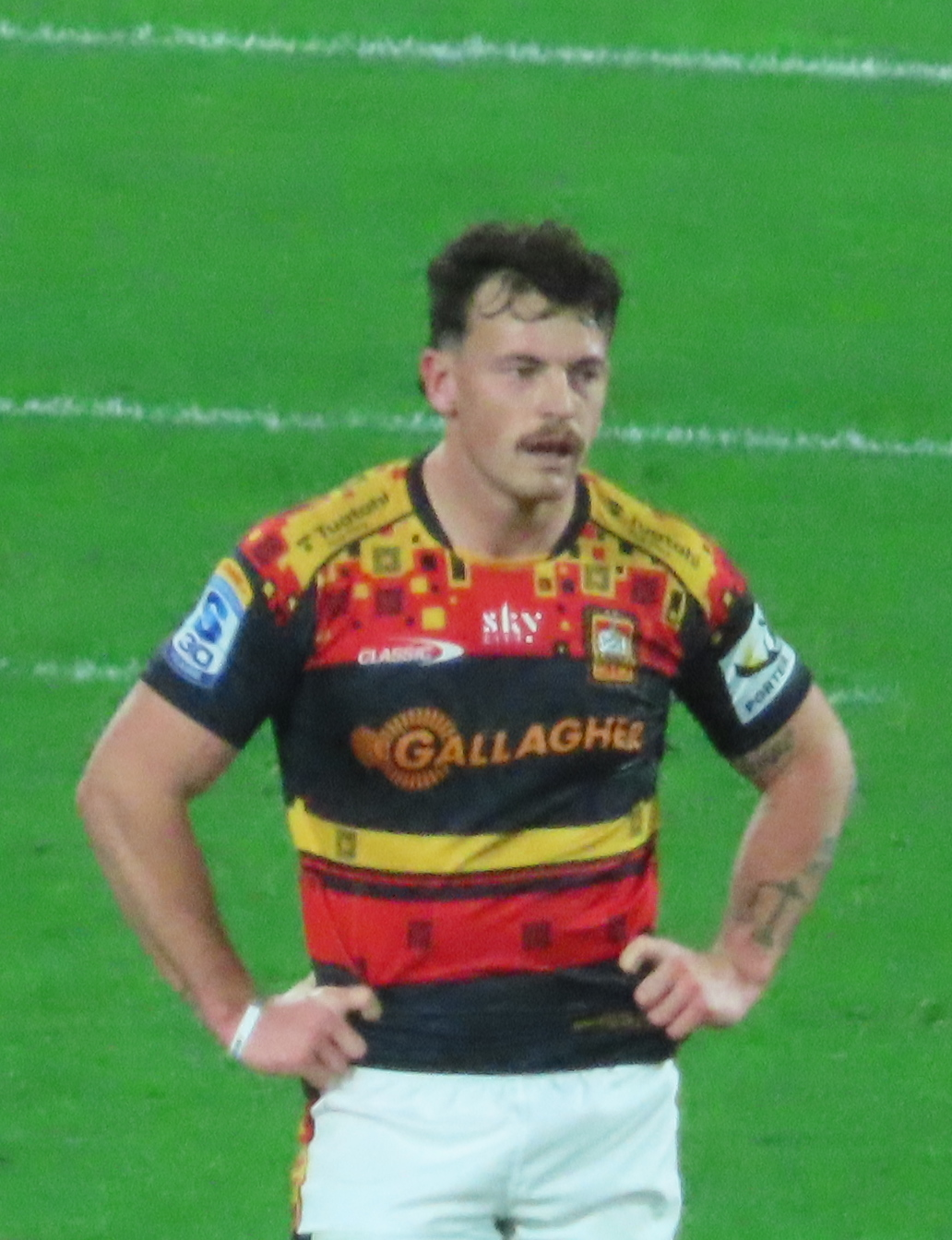
- Carter playing for the Chiefs in the 2026 Super Rugby Pacific final
- Full name: Leroy Bert Carter
- Born: 24 February 1999 (age 27) Tauranga, New Zealand
- Height: 1.80 m (5 ft 11 in)
- Weight: 86 kg (190 lb; 13 st 8 lb)
- School: Tauranga Boys' College

Rugby union career
- Position: Winger
- Current team: Bay of Plenty, Chiefs
Senior career
Years	Team	Apps	(Points)
2019–2025	Bay of Plenty	42	(85)
2025–	Chiefs	15	(45)
- Correct as of 21 June 2025
International career
Years	Team	Apps	(Points)
2019	New Zealand U20	7	(5)
2022–2024	New Zealand 7s	116	(265)
2025–	New Zealand	6	(15)
- Correct as of 30 September 2025
Medal record
Men's rugby sevens
Representing New Zealand
Commonwealth Games
Bronze medal – third place	2022 Birmingham	Team competition

Leroy Bert Carter (born 24 February 1999) is a New Zealand professional rugby union player who plays as a winger for Bay of Plenty, the Chiefs, and the All Blacks.

== International career ==
He has signed for the Chiefs wider training squad in 2020. Carter was named in the All Blacks Sevens squad for the 2022 Commonwealth Games in Birmingham. He won a bronze medal at the event.

In 2024, he competed for New Zealand at the Paris Olympics.

In 2024, Carter made the permanent switch back to union from 7s. Opting to sign for the Chiefs to play in Super Rugby Pacific. After one season in the Chiefs jersey, scoring nine tries, he was brought into the All Blacks squad as an injury replacement for Caleb Clarke. Shortly after this, he made his debut at Eden Park against the Springboks on September 6, 2025.
