= Josh Lord (rugby union) =

New Zealand rugby union player

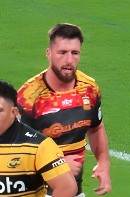
- Lord playing for the Chiefs in the 2026 Super Rugby Pacific final
- Full name: Josh Matthew John Lord
- Born: 17 January 2001 (age 25) Auckland, New Zealand
- Height: 2.03 m (6 ft 8 in)
- Weight: 112 kg (247 lb; 17 st 9 lb)
- School: Hamilton Boys' High School

Rugby union career
- Position: Lock
- Current team: Taranaki, Chiefs
Senior career
Years	Team	Apps	(Points)
2019–	Taranaki	35	(10)
2021–	Chiefs	46	(5)
- Correct as of 17 October 2026
International career
Years	Team	Apps	(Points)
2021–	New Zealand	18	(0)
- Correct as of 17 October 2026

Josh Matthew John Lord (born 17 January 2001) is a New Zealand rugby union player who plays as a lock for the Chiefs in Super Rugby, Taranaki in the National Provincial Championship and the All Blacks in international rugby.

== Club career ==
He was named in the Chiefs wider training squad for the 2020 Super Rugby season, and into the full squad for 2021.

== International career ==
Lord was called up to the All Blacks, New Zealand's national team, for the 2021 end-of-year tests, as cover for Scott Barrett, despite having only one season at Super Rugby. He made his international debut for New Zealand, playing 22 minutes off the bench against the USA Eagles on 24 October.
