= Simon Parker =

New Zealand rugby union player

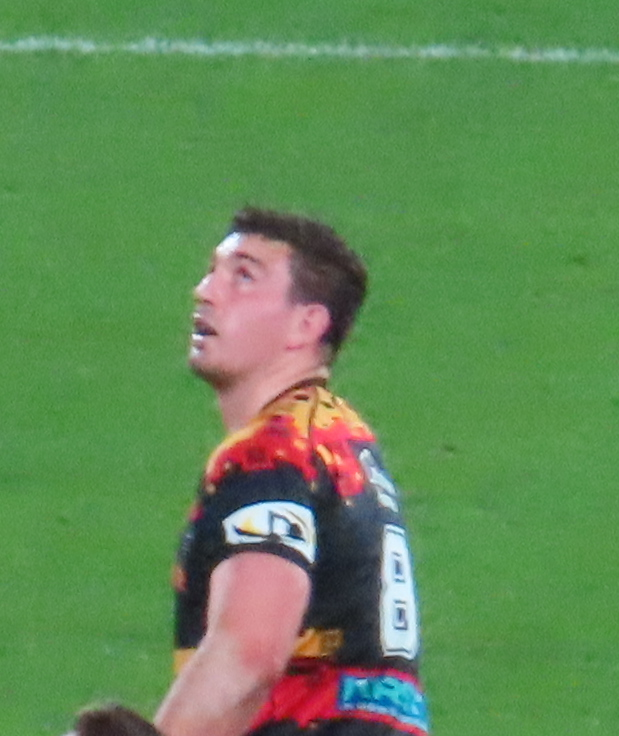
- Parker playing for the Chiefs at the 2026 Super Rugby Pacific final
- Born: 6 May 2000 (age 26) New Zealand
- Height: 197 cm (6 ft 6 in)
- Weight: 117 kg (258 lb; 18 st 6 lb)
- School: St Peter’s School, Cambridge

Rugby union career
- Position: Flanker
- Current team: Chiefs, Northland
Senior career
Years	Team	Apps	(Points)
2019–2023	Waikato	22	(15)
2020–	Chiefs	35	(15)
2024–	Northland	11	(10)
- Correct as of 8 August 2025
International career
Years	Team	Apps	(Points)
2019	New Zealand U20	7	(0)
2024	All Blacks XV	1	(0)
2025	New Zealand	7	(0)
- Correct as of 8 August 2025

Simon Parker (born 6 May 2000) is a New Zealand rugby union player who plays for the Chiefs in Super Rugby and Northland in the Bunnings NPC. His position is flanker.
