= Peter Lakai =

New Zealand rugby union player

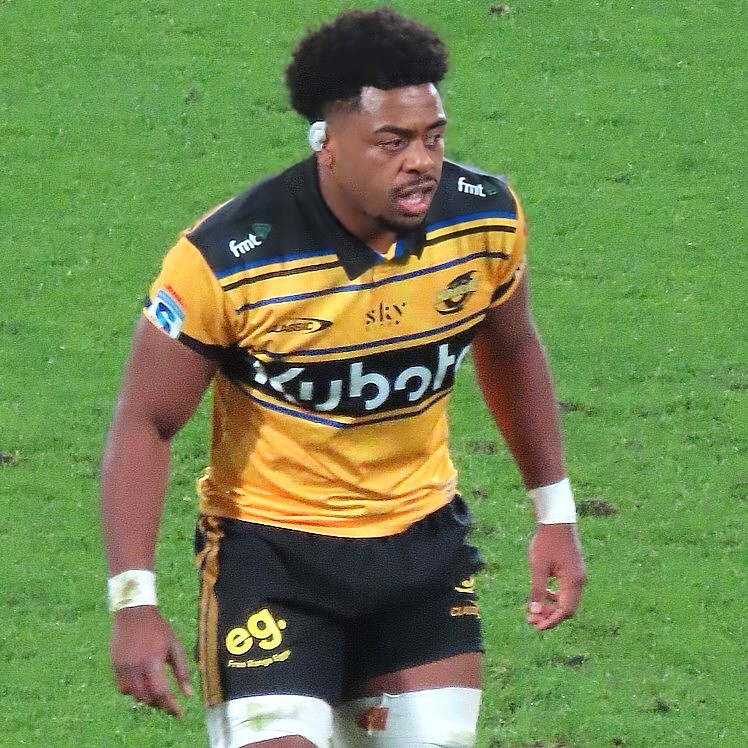
- Lakai playing for the Hurricanes in the 2026 Super Rugby final
- Born: 4 March 2003 (age 23) Auckland, New Zealand
- Height: 186 cm (6 ft 1 in)
- Weight: 108 kg (238 lb; 17 st 0 lb)
- School: St Patrick's College, Silverstream

Rugby union career
- Position(s): Flanker, Number 8
- Current team: Wellington, Hurricanes
Senior career
Years	Team	Apps	(Points)
2022–	Wellington	36	(30)
2023–	Hurricanes	51	(65)
- Correct as of 17 October 2026
International career
Years	Team	Apps	(Points)
2022–2023	New Zealand U20	7	(15)
2024–	New Zealand	19	(20)
- Correct as of 21 November 2026

Peter Lakai (born 4 March 2003) is a New Zealand rugby union player who plays as a flanker and number 8 for the Hurricanes in Super Rugby, Wellington in the National Provincial Championship, and the New Zealand national team.

== Early and personal life ==
Lakai was born in Auckland, New Zealand in 2003 and moved to Wellington, the nations capital, when he was in his youth. Lakai has stated that he considers Wellington his hometown. Lakai is of Ghanaian descent through his father and Tongan descent via his mother. In an interview with Stuff, Lakai said he is often confused for being Fijian. He was raised solo by his mother, Saline. Alongside other Hurricanes teammates Salesi Rayasi and Billy Proctor, Lakai enjoys basketball and is a fan of the Boston Celtics in the National Basketball Association (NBA).

== Career ==
On 26 October 2024, Lakai made his international debut for New Zealand (All Blacks) off the bench in a 64–19 win over Japan during their 2024 Spring Tour.

In 2026, Lakai formed part of the Hurricanes squad which won the 2026 Super Rugby Pacific season. On 20 June, the Hurricanes defeated the Chiefs 60–5 in the final.
