= Fabian Holland (rugby union) =

NZ international rugby union player

- Born: 9 October 2002 (age 24) Alkmaar, North Holland, Netherlands
- Height: 204 cm (6 ft 8 in)
- Weight: 124 kg (19 st 7 lb; 273 lb)
- School: Christchurch Boys' High School
- University: University of Otago

Rugby union career
- Position: Lock
- Current team: Otago, Highlanders
Senior career
Years	Team	Apps	(Points)
2021–	Otago	30	(30)
2022–	Highlanders	34	(5)
- Correct as of 5 September 2026
International career
Years	Team	Apps	(Points)
2021	New Zealand U20	2	(0)
2024	Barbarians	1	(0)
2025	All Blacks XV	1	(0)
2025–	New Zealand	18	(5)
- Correct as of 21 November 2026

Fabian Holland (born 9 October 2002) is a professional Dutch-born New Zealand rugby union player who plays as a lock for Otago in New Zealand's National Provincial Championship (NPC) competition and for the Highlanders in Super Rugby.

Born in the Netherlands, he represents the New Zealand national team, having lived in the country since 2019.

== Early life ==
Holland was born in Alkmaar in the Netherlands, and grew up in the nearby village of Akersloot. Holland began playing rugby at Castricumse Rugby Club at age five. In 2014, the All Black Sevens team held a training camp at Holland's club, further inspiring his pursuit of rugby and a passion for the All Blacks.

Holland moved to New Zealand in early 2019 to study and play rugby at Christchurch Boys' High School for what was initially meant to be a stay of six months.

== Career ==
After leaving high school, In 2021 Holland moved to Dunedin and signed with the Highlanders, joining the under-20 squad. He also joined the Dunedin Rugby Football Club (Inc) where he has played for the Premier team when available.

In 2021, he signed a high performance contract with the Highlanders and played for the Highlanders development team, known as the Bravehearts. On 23 June 2022, the Highlanders announced that Holland had signed a three-year (fully professional) contract with the Dunedin-based franchise.

=== International career ===
Holland played for the New Zealand under-20 team in 2021 and the New Zealand Barbarians under-18 team in 2020. In 2020, Holland made the New Zealand Schools team.

In June 2025, Holland was named in the All Blacks squad for the 2025 France tour of New Zealand. Later that year Holland was also capped for all six games of The Rugby Championship and made several appearances during the end-of-year internationals. After a successful debut season with the All Blacks, Holland was named Men's 15s Breakthrough Player of the Year for 2025 by World Rugby, beating other nominees Ethan Hooker, Henry Pollock and Joseph-Aukuso Sua'ali'i.
