= 2025 Bunnings NPC =

2025 rugby union competition in New Zealand

2025 Bunnings NPC season
- Countries: New Zealand
- Date: 31 July – 25 October 2025
- Champions: Canterbury
- Runners-up: Otago
- Matches played: 77
- Tries scored: 631 (average 8.2 per match)
- Top point scorer: Cam Millar (Otago); 156 points
- Top try scorer: Lucas Casey (Otago); Fehi Fineanganofo (Bay of Plenty); Tomasi Maka (Tasman); 9 tries

Official website
- www.provincial.rugby

The 2025 Bunnings NPC was the twentieth season of New Zealand's provincial rugby union competition, the National Provincial Championship, since it turned professional in 2006. It involved the top fourteen provincial rugby unions of New Zealand. For sponsorship reasons, the competition is known as the Bunnings NPC. The regular season began on 31 July 2025, when Auckland hosted Waikato. The final took place on 25 October 2025, and saw Canterbury beat Otago 36–28.

== Format ==
Under the current competition format, which is largely a continuation of that of 2023, the 14 provincial unions participating in the Bunnings NPC are grouped in one single division, ranked on one single competition table and play for one NPC title.

All provincial teams play ten games during the regular season (round robin): five games are played at the provincial union's home ground and five games are away games. The seven teams that finished the previous season in 1st, 3rd, 5th, 7th, 9th, 11th and 13th place will play each other as well as four cross-over matches against the teams that finished 2nd, 4th, 6th, 8th, 10th, 12th and 14th. Likewise, the teams that finished 2nd, 4th, 6th, 8th, 10th, 12th and 14th will also play each other as well as four cross-over games against the provinces that were ranked 1st, 3rd, 5th, 7th, 9th, 11th or 13th at the end of the previous season. The ten round robin games in 2025 are played over a period of ten weeks (starting on 31 July 2025); this period is one week longer than previous seasons because the competition schedule no longer includes a mid-week game.

The regular season is followed by quarter-finals to be played by the eight highest ranked teams on the competition table. The finals rankings are determined by the number of competition points earned during the regular season. Competition points can be gained in the following way: four points are awarded to the winning team, two points to each team for a draw, and no points for a loss. Teams can also receive a bonus point if they score four or more tries in a match, or lose by seven points or less.

If two or more provincial teams finish with an equal number of competition points, the following tiebreaker rules apply. If two unions are tied, the union which has defeated the other in a head-to-head is placed higher. In case of a draw between them, the side with the biggest points difference is ranked higher. If three or more unions are tied and they have all played each other, the team with most competition points in that year against the other tied unions is ranked higher; if they have not all played each other, the team with the biggest points difference in the round robin is ranked higher. In all cases, if these unions are still tied, the ranking is decided by the highest number of tries scored, the most points scored, or a coin toss.

The quarter-finals are played as follows, with the highest ranked team hosting:

QF 1: 1 v 8;
QF 2: 2 v 7;
QF 3: 3 v 6; and
QF 4: 4 v 5.

In the semi-finals, the highest-ranked quarter-final winner hosts the lowest-ranked quarter-final winner and the second highest-ranked quarter-final winner hosts the third highest-ranked quarter-final winner.

The NPC Final will be played between the two semi-final winners, again at the home venue of the team with the higher finals ranking.

The rules governing the Ranfurly Shield state that every home game during the regular season played by the union that holds the Ranfurly Shield is a mandatory challenge match. No challenge matches will be played after the regular season has ended (i.e., during the finals). A holder who competes in the Bunnings NPC must also accept at least two challenges from unions competing in the Heartland Championship, including a challenge lodged by the winner of the Meads Cup at the end of the previous season. These non-mandatory challenge matches must be played before the start of the NPC season.

== Standings ==
Pos	Team	Pld	W	D	L	PF	PA	PD	TF	TA	TB	LB	Pts	Qualification
1	Canterbury (C)	10	8	1	1	326	168	+158	52	26	7	1	42	Bunnings NPC quarter-finals
2	Otago (RU) (RS)	10	8	0	2	338	248	+90	45	36	7	2	41	Bunnings NPC quarter-finals
3	Bay of Plenty	10	7	0	3	320	178	+142	46	25	6	2	36	Bunnings NPC quarter-finals
4	Hawke's Bay	10	7	0	3	322	226	+96	47	32	6	1	35	Bunnings NPC quarter-finals
5	Taranaki	10	6	0	4	318	229	+89	45	33	6	2	32	Bunnings NPC quarter-finals
6	Tasman	10	5	0	5	324	290	+34	50	43	8	2	30	Bunnings NPC quarter-finals
7	Waikato	10	6	0	4	234	291	−57	33	42	5	0	29	Bunnings NPC quarter-finals
8	Counties Manukau	10	5	0	5	335	318	+17	50	46	6	1	27	Bunnings NPC quarter-finals
9	Northland	10	5	1	4	222	234	−12	30	33	2	1	25	
10	Wellington	10	3	0	7	321	337	−16	46	49	7	2	21	
11	Manawatu	10	3	0	7	247	403	−156	39	61	5	1	18	
12	Auckland	10	2	0	8	253	379	−126	38	55	6	2	16	
13	Southland	10	3	0	7	211	366	−155	29	53	2	2	16	
14	North Harbour	10	1	0	9	206	310	−104	29	45	3	3	10	

Source: Bunnings NPC fixtures & standings 2025
(C) Champions; (RU) Runners-up; RS Ranfurly Shield holders

=== Standings progression ===
Each team's cumulative points total is shown for every week of the regular season with the overall log position in brackets.

Team	W1	W2	W3	W4	W5	W6	W7	W8	W9	W10	QF	SF	Final
Auckland	2 (8th)	3 (11th)	3 (12th)	4 (12th)	4 (12th)	9 (12th)	14 (11th)	15 (12th)	16 (12th)	16 (12th)	DNQ	DNQ	DNQ
Bay of Plenty	5 (2nd)	10 (1st)	10 (4th)	11 (7th)	15 (5th)	20 (4th)	21 (6th)	26 (4th)	31 (4th)	36 (3rd)	Won	Lost	DNQ
Canterbury	5 (3rd)	9 (4th)	13 (3rd)	18 (1st)	23 (1st)	28 (1st)	33 (1st)	35 (1st)	37 (1st)	42 (1st)	Won	Won	Won
Counties Manukau	0 (14th)	1 (14th)	3 (13th)	3 (13th)	3 (13th)	7 (13th)	12 (13th)	17 (10th)	22 (9th)	27 (8th)	Lost	DNQ	DNQ
Hawke's Bay	5 (1st)	9 (2nd)	14 (2nd)	14 (5th)	15 (6th)	20 (5th)	24 (3rd)	25 (5th)	30 (5th)	35 (4th)	Won	Lost	DNQ
Manawatu	5 (4th)	5 (9th)	6 (10th)	11 (8th)	11 (11th)	16 (7th)	17 (9th)	17 (11th)	18 (11th)	18 (11th)	DNQ	DNQ	DNQ
North Harbour	0 (10th)	1 (13th)	1 (14th)	1 (14th)	1 (14th)	2 (14th)	4 (14th)	5 (14th)	6 (14th)	10 (14th)	DNQ	DNQ	DNQ
Northland	0 (12th)	4 (10th)	4 (11th)	9 (10th)	13 (10th)	13 (10th)	18 (8th)	22 (8th)	24 (8th)	25 (9th)	DNQ	DNQ	DNQ
Otago	4 (7th)	5 (6th)	10 (6th)	15 (4th)	16 (4th)	21 (2nd)	26 (2nd)	31 (2nd)	36 (2nd)	41 (2nd)	Won	Won	Lost
Southland	0 (9th)	1 (12th)	6 (9th)	10 (9th)	14 (7th)	14 (9th)	14 (12th)	14 (13th)	15 (13th)	16 (13th)	DNQ	DNQ	DNQ
Taranaki	4 (6th)	9 (3rd)	14 (1st)	15 (2nd)	20 (2nd)	20 (3rd)	22 (4th)	27 (3rd)	32 (3rd)	32 (5th)	Lost	DNQ	DNQ
Tasman	0 (13th)	5 (7th)	10 (5th)	15 (3rd)	20 (3rd)	20 (6th)	22 (5th)	24 (7th)	29 (6th)	30 (6th)	Lost	DNQ	DNQ
Waikato	5 (5th)	6 (5th)	10 (7th)	14 (6th)	14 (8th)	15 (8th)	20 (7th)	25 (6th)	25 (7th)	29 (7th)	Lost	DNQ	DNQ
Wellington	0 (11th)	5 (8th)	7 (8th)	8 (11th)	13 (9th)	13 (11th)	14 (10th)	19 (9th)	19 (10th)	21 (10th)	DNQ	DNQ	DNQ
Key:	Win	Draw	Loss	No game	DNQ = did not qualify								

== Regular season ==
During the regular season of the 2025 Bunnings NPC, each team played 10 games over a period of 10 weeks. The competition started on 31 July 2025, when Auckland narrowly lost 35–36 to Waikato in Auckland. The first Ranfurly Shield defence of the season took place on 2 August 2025, when Taranaki beat Northland 23–3 in New Plymouth.

=== Week 1 ===
31 July 2025
19:10 NZST

Auckland	35–36	Waikato
Try: Anton Segner 6'; Xavier Tito-Harris (2) 14', 44'; Payton Spencer 58'; Con: Alex Harford (2/2) 7', 15'; Rico Simpson (1/2) 45'; Pen: Rico Simpson (3/3) 32', 43', 74'	Report	Try: Bailyn Sullivan 18'; Manaaki Boyle-Tiatia 24'; Oli Mathis 61'; Tepaea Cook-Savage 68'; Rui Farrant 77'; Lima Sopoaga 79'; Con: Aaron Cruden (3/6) 25', 62', 80'; Cards: Austin Anderson (yellow card) 31'

Eden Park, Auckland
Attendance: 1,400
Referee: Paul Williams

1 August 2025
19:10 NZST

Manawatu	38–25	North Harbour
Try: Jordi Viljoen 24'; Taniela Filimone (2) 39', 77'; Raymond Tuputupu 67'; Jai Tamati 71'; Con: Brett Cameron (5/5) 25', 40+1', 68', 72', 79'; Pen: Brett Cameron (1/2) 31'	Report	Try: Jed Melvin 27'; Sofai Maka 46'; Siaosi Nginingini 75'; Con: Patrick Pellegrini (2/3) 47', 76'; Pen: Patrick Pellegrini (2/2) 51', 64'

Central Energy Trust Arena, Palmerston North
Referee: Nick Hogan

2 August 2025
14:05 NZST

Wellington	15–33	Canterbury
Try: Losi Filipo 27'; Nui Muriwai 76'; Con: Jackson Garden-Bachop (1/1) 28'; Callum Harkin (0/1); Pen: Jackson Garden-Bachop (1/1) 54'	Report	Try: Johnny McNicholl (2) 7', 60'; Corey Kellow 55'; Cullen Grace 67'; Nick Hyde 80+1'; Con: James White (2/3) 7', 61'; Chay Fihaki (2/2) 68', 80+2'

Jerry Collins Stadium, Porirua (Note: The venue for Wellington's home matches wasn't yet known at the time the schedule for the 2025 Bunnings NPC was released. On 28 May 2025, Wellington Rugby announced that the Lions' five home games of the regular season would be played at Porirua Park. Any home play-off games would be hosted at Sky Stadium, Wellington.)
Referee: Todd Petrie

2 August 2025
16:35 NZST

Southland	15–24	Otago
Try: Jack Taylor 13'; Nic Shearer 55'; Con: Byron Smith (0/1); Mika Muliaina (1/1) 56'; Pen: Byron Smith (1/1) 33'	Report	Try: Sam Gilbert 16'; Christian Lio-Willie 37'; Will Stodart 40+1'; Con: Cam Millar (3/3) 17', 38', 40+1'; Pen: Cam Millar (1/1) 25'; Cards: Sam Gilbert (yellow card) 55'

Rugby Park, Invercargill
Attendance: 8,185
Referee: James Doleman

2 August 2025
19:10 NZST

RS – Taranaki	23–3	Northland
Try: Vereniki Tikoisolomone 8'; Josh Jacomb 21'; Adam Lennox 44'; Con: Josh Jacomb (1/3) 44'; Pen: Josh Jacomb (2/2) 15', 57'	Report	Pen: Rivez Reihana (1/1) 11'

Stadium Taranaki, New Plymouth (Note: On 4 February 2025, the New Plymouth District Council published a media release in which it was announced that Yarrows the Bakers' naming rights sponsorship of Taranaki's home venue, Yarrow Stadium, would come to an end and that the stadium would be known as Stadium Taranaki from 8 March 2025. When the draw for the 2025 Bunnings NPC was released on 17 March 2025, it still used the name Yarrow Stadium.)
Referee: Mike Winter

3 August 2025
14:05 NZST

Bay of Plenty	37–7	Tasman
Try: Kaleb Trask (2) 4', 77'; Kurt Eklund 15'; Leroy Carter 60'; Cole Forbes 67'; Con: Kaleb Trask (3/5) 61', 68', 78'; Pen: Kaleb Trask (1/2) 55'; Drop: Emoni Narawa (1/1) 80+1'	Report	Try: Ryan Coxon 46'; Con: William Havili (1/1) 47'; Cards: Josh Te Hira (yellow card) 14'

Tauranga Domain, Tauranga
Referee: Marcus Playle

3 August 2025
16:35 NZST

Hawke's Bay	54–14	Counties Manukau
Try: Nick Grigg 7'; Jonah Lowe 22'; Kienan Higgins 32'; Lukas Ripley (2) 42', 74'; Cooper Flanders 64'; Andrew Tauatevalu 72'; Lincoln McClutchie 80'; Con: Harry Godfrey (6/6) 8', 23', 33', 43', 65', 73'; Lincoln McClutchie (1/2) 80'; Cards: Jonah Lowe (yellow card) 44'	Report	Try: Leo Ngatai-Tafau 37'; Jimmy Tupou 48'; Con: Riley Hohepa (2/2) 38', 49'

McLean Park, Napier
Referee: Stuart Curran

=== Week 2 ===
8 August 2025
19:10 NZST

Northland	22–17	Southland
Try: James Mullan (3) 44', 62', 69'; Con: Rivez Reihana (2/3) 45', 64'; Pen: Rivez Reihana (1/1) 78'	Report	Try: Scott Gregory 17'; Sean Withy 56'; Con: Dan Hollinshead (1/1) 18'; Mika Muliaina (1/1) 57'; Pen: Mika Muliaina (1/1) 80+1'

Semenoff Stadium, Whangārei
Referee: Maggie Cogger-Orr

9 August 2025
14:05 NZST

North Harbour	24–46	Taranaki
Try: Karl Ruzich 31'; Kade Banks 35'; Tom Hendrickson 40+1'; Sofai Maka 51'; Con: Oscar Koller (2/3) 31', 40+1'; Cameron Howell (0/1); Cards: Oscar Koller (yellow card) 42'	Report	Try: Bradley Slater (3) 9', 23', 65'; Taniela Rakuro 26'; Jared Proffit 32'; Daniel Rona 43'; Arese Poliko 54'; Vereniki Tikoisolomone 75'; Con: Josh Jacomb (3/8) 44', 55', 66'; Cards: Logan Crowley (yellow card) 79'

North Harbour Stadium, Albany
Referee: James Doleman

9 August 2025
14:05 NZST

Waikato	24–35	Wellington
Try: Aaron Cruden 38'; Xavier Roe 44'; Xavier Saifoloi 49'; Pita Anae-Ah Sue 71'; Con: Tepaea Cook-Savage (1/3) 45'; Aaron Cruden (1/1) 72'	Report	Try: PJ Sheck 6'; Jackson Garden-Bachop 10'; Julian Savea 33'; Tjay Clarke 52'; Akira Ieremia 56'; Con: Jackson Garden-Bachop (5/5) 7', 11', 35', 53', 57'

FMG Stadium Waikato, Hamilton
Referee: Ben O'Keeffe

9 August 2025
16:35 NZST

Tasman	49–17	Manawatu
Try: Eli Oudenryn 9'; Lopeti Faifua 23'; Leicester Faingaʻanuku (2) 27', 30'; Tone Ng Shiu 68'; Fletcher Anderson 74'; William Havili 77'; Con: William Havili (7/7) 9', 23', 28', 31', 69', 75', 78'	Report	Try: James Tofa 49'; Taine Roiri 58'; Kyle Brown 70'; Con: Brett Cameron (1/3) 50'

Trafalgar Park, Nelson
Referee: Jackson Henshaw

9 August 2025
19:10 NZST

Canterbury	19–15	Auckland
Try: Nick Hyde 12'; Zach Gallagher 51'; Jone Rova 70'; Con: James White (2/3) 13', 52'; Pen: Chay Fihaki (0/1)	Report	Try: Cody Vai (2) 26', 39'; Xavier Tito-Harris 36'; Con: Xavi Taele (0/3)

Apollo Projects Stadium, Christchurch
Referee: Fraser Hannon

10 August 2025
14:05 NZST

Counties Manukau	22–39	Bay of Plenty
Try: Zuriel Togiatama 22'; Adam Brash 46'; Ioane Moananu (2) 55', 74'; Con: Riley Hohepa (1/3) 23'; AJ Alatimu (0/1)	Report	Try: Veveni Lasaqa 9'; Lucas Cashmore 15'; Naitoa Ah Kuoi 40+1'; Kurt Eklund 70'; Charlie Sinton 76'; Con: Kaleb Trask (4/5) 10', 16', 40+3', 77'; Pen: Lucas Cashmore (0/1); Kaleb Trask (2/2) 62', 66'; Cards: Kurt Eklund (yellow card) 43'; Kaleb Trask (yellow card) 44'

Navigation Homes Stadium, Pukekohe
Referee: Angus Mabey

10 August 2025
16:35 NZST

Otago	21–27	Hawke's Bay
Try: Joseva Tamani 29'; Jona Nareki 32'; Lucas Casey 79'; Con: Cam Millar (3/3) 29', 33', 79'	Report	Try: Ere Enari 18'; Devan Flanders 23'; Jacob Devery 58'; Con: Harry Godfrey (3/3) 19', 24', 59'; Pen: Harry Godfrey (2/2) 5', 40+1'

Forsyth Barr Stadium, Dunedin
Referee: Paul Williams

=== Week 3 ===
15 August 2025
19:10 NZST

Southland	29–22	Manawatu
Try: Faletoi Peni 53'; Michael Manson 56'; Alex Yallop 62'; Fletcher Morgan 71'; Con: Dan Hollinshead (3/4) 53', 57', 62'; Pen: Dan Hollinshead (1/1) 68'	Report	Try: Ngani Laumape 9'; Vernon Bason 15'; Drew Wild 29'; Con: Brett Cameron (2/3) 10', 30'; Pen: Brett Cameron (1/1) 24'

Rugby Park, Invercargill
Referee: Fraser Hannon

16 August 2025
14:05 NZST

Bay of Plenty	7–21	Canterbury
Try: Kurt Eklund 18'; Con: Kaleb Trask (1/1) 19'	Report	Try: Sam Darry (2) 10', 35'; Corey Kellow 72'; Con: James White (3/3) 11', 36', 73'

Tauranga Domain, Tauranga
Referee: Mike Winter

16 August 2025
14:05 NZST

Northland	14–28	Tasman
Try: Jordan Hutchings 44'; Jordan Trainor 53'; Con: Rivez Reihana (2/2) 44', 54'	Report	Try: Eli Oudenryn 17'; Levi Aumua 31'; Macca Springer 35'; Sione Havili Talitui 63'; Con: William Havili (4/4) 18', 32', 36', 64'

Semenoff Stadium, Whangārei
Referee: Angus Mabey

16 August 2025
16:35 NZST

Auckland	8–50	Taranaki
Try: Xavier Tito-Harris 80+3'; Con: Rico Simpson (0/1); Pen: Alex Harford (1/1) 11'	Report	Try: Josh Jacomb (3) 8', 43', 65'; Adam Lennox (2) 28', 57'; Vereniki Tikoisolomone 40+1'; Sage Walters-Hansen 77'; Con: Josh Jacomb (6/7) 8', 29', 44', 58', 67’, 78'; Pen: Josh Jacomb (1/1) 17'

Eden Park, Auckland
Attendance: 10,300
Referee: Nick Hogan

16 August 2025
19:10 NZST

Hawke's Bay	36–22	North Harbour
Try: Nick Grigg (2) 20', 67'; Folau Fakatava 29'; Tom Parsons 33'; Harry Godfrey 65'; Lukas Ripley 78'; Con: Harry Godfrey (3/5) 20', 30', 66'; Lincoln McClutchie (0/1)	Report	Try: Jed Melvin (2) 13', 56'; Sofai Maka 60'; Con: Oscar Koller (1/2) 14'; Cameron Howell (1/1) 61'; Pen: Oscar Koller (1/3) 37'

McLean Park, Napier
Referee: Todd Petrie

17 August 2025
14:05 NZST

Wellington	41–46	Otago
Try: Matt Proctor (2) 2', 60'; Hugo Plummer 5'; Esi Komaisavai 35'; Tom Maiava 46'; Akira Ieremia 50'; Con: Jackson Garden-Bachop (4/6) 2', 6', 47', 51'; Pen: Jackson Garden-Bachop (1/1) 80'	Report	Try: Dylan Pledger 19'; Lucas Casey (2) 23', 34'; Will Tucker 42'; Jona Nareki 53'; Thomas Umaga-Jensen 67'; Con: Cam Millar (5/6) 21', 24', 34', 43', 54'; Pen: Cam Millar (2/2) 40', 73'

Jerry Collins Stadium, Porirua
Referee: Stuart Curran

17 August 2025
16:35 NZST

Waikato	27–26	Counties Manukau
Try: Rui Farrant 15'; Mitch Jacobson 18'; Bailyn Sullivan 55'; Con: Aaron Cruden (2/2) 16', 19'; Tepaea Cook-Savage (1/1) 56'; Pen: Aaron Cruden (1/1) 32'; Tepaea Cook-Savage (1/2) 80+2'	Report	Try: Etene Nanai-Seturo 8'; Peniasi Malimali 37'; Hoskins Sotutu 51'; Jackson Rainsford 61'; Con: Riley Hohepa (3/4) 9', 37', 62'

FMG Stadium Waikato, Hamilton
Referee: Marcus Playle

=== Week 4 ===
21 August 2025
19:10 NZST

Bay of Plenty	25–30	Southland
Try: Josh Bartlett 29'; Ngarohi McGarvey-Black 53'; Kaleb Trask 60'; Con: Kaleb Trask (2/3) 30', 61'; Pen: Kaleb Trask (2/3) 73', 80+2'	Report	Try: Nic Shearer 43'; Nic Souchon 64'; Michael Manson 79'; Con: Mika Muliaina (1/1) 44'; Byron Smith (2/2) 65', 80'; Pen: Mika Muliaina (2/2) 25', 39'; Byron Smith (1/1) 76'

Rotorua International Stadium, Rotorua
Referee: Todd Petrie

22 August 2025
19:10 NZST

Hawke's Bay	7–26	Canterbury
Try: Miracle Faiʻilagi 54'; Con: Harry Godfrey (1/1) 56'	Report	Try: Corey Kellow 8'; Manasa Mataele 33'; Chay Fihaki 63'; Johnny McNicholl 68'; Con: Chay Fihaki (3/4) 9', 64', 69'

McLean Park, Napier
Referee: Marcus Playle

23 August 2025
14:05 NZST

Taranaki	22–23	Waikato – RS
Try: Josh Setu 24'; Logan Crowley 42'; Obey Samate 47'; Con: Josh Jacomb (2/3) 43', 48'; Pen: Josh Jacomb (1/1) 63'; Cards: Jesse Parete (yellow card) 10'	Report	Try: Dylan Eti 59'; Xavier Roe 69'; Con: Lima Sopoaga (2/2) 60', 70'; Pen: Aaron Cruden (2/2) 21', 46'; Lima Sopoaga (1/1) 80+1'

Stadium Taranaki, New Plymouth
Referee: Angus Mabey

23 August 2025
16:35 NZST

North Harbour	19–43	Tasman
Try: Siaosi Nginingini 47'; Tom Barham 66'; Penaia Cakobau 80'; Con: Oscar Koller (2/3) 48', 80+1'	Report	Try: Tayne Hemopo 2'; Macca Springer (4) 9', 19', 24', 58'; Tomasi Maka 14'; Hunter Leppien 53'; Con: William Havili (3/5) 10', 20', 25'; Cooper Grant (1/2) 54'

North Harbour Stadium, Albany
Referee: Ben Woolerton

23 August 2025
19:10 NZST

Auckland	24–43	Northland
Try: Xavier Tito-Harris (2) 40+1', 46'; Josh Beehre 42'; Xavi Taele 69'; Con: Alex Harford (2/4) 43', 47'	Report	Try: Reesjan Pasitoa (2) 14', 26'; Sam Nock 21'; Allan Craig 33'; Rivez Reihana 56'; Nathan Salmon 75'; Con: Rivez Reihana (5/6) 15', 22', 34', 57', 76'; Pen: Rivez Reihana (1/1) 63'; Cards: Brady Rush (yellow card) 39'

Eden Park, Auckland
Attendance: 1,600
Referee: Takehito Namekawa (Japan)

24 August 2025
14:05 NZST

Otago	33–19	Counties Manukau
Try: Sam Gilbert 8'; Jona Nareki 19'; Will Tucker 26'; Dylan Pledger 50'; Cam Millar 58'; Con: Cam Millar (4/5) 20', 27', 51', 59'; Pen: Cam Millar (0/1)	Report	Try: Simon-Peter Toleafoa 10'; Keran van Staden 40+1'; Gibson Popoali'i 63'; Con: Jackson Rainsford (1/1) 10'; Simon-Peter Toleafoa (0/1); Gibson Popoali'i (1/1) 64'

Forsyth Barr Stadium, Dunedin
Attendance: 3,100
Referee: Jackson Henshaw

24 August 2025
16:35 NZST

Manawatu	38–28	Wellington
Try: TK Howden 17'; James Tofa (3) 22', 42', 64'; Taniela Filimone (2) 53', 60'; Con: Brett Cameron (2/2) 18', 23'; Drew Wild (2/4) 43', 61'	Report	Try: Stanley Solomon (3) 29', 46', 67'; Losi Filipo 76'; Con: Jackson Garden-Bachop (4/4) 30', 47', 68', 77'

Central Energy Trust Arena, Palmerston North
Referee: Paul Williams

=== Week 5 ===
29 August 2025
19:10 NZST

North Harbour	7–19	Bay of Plenty
Try: Luke Campbell 49'; Con: Cameron Howell (1/1) 49'; Cards: Tom Savage (yellow card) 7'	Report	Try: Kurt Eklund 8'; Veveni Lasaqa 73'; Con: Kaleb Trask (0/2); Pen: Kaleb Trask (3/3) 25', 40+4', 57'

North Harbour Stadium, Albany
Referee: Marcus Playle

30 August 2025
14:05 NZST

Canterbury	53–14	Manawatu
Try: Corey Kellow (2) 1', 38'; Jamie Hannah (2) 8', 65'; Manasa Mataele 41'; Sam Darry 47'; Brodie McAlister 57'; Tyson Belworthy 67'; Ngane Punivai 80'; Con: Riley Williams (2/5) 2', 48'; Shun Miyake (1/3) 68'; Ngane Punivai (1/1) 80+1'	Report	Try: Junta Hamano 36'; Kyle Brown 78'; Con: Sam Coles (1/1) 37'; Liam O'Connor (1/1) 79'

Rangiora Showground Oval, Rangiora
Referee: Angus Mabey

30 August 2025
14:05 NZST

Counties Manukau	22–43	Taranaki
Try: Sione Molia 15'; Hoskins Sotutu 29'; Sione Takai 65'; Con: Gibson Popoali'i (2/3) 16', 66'; Pen: Gibson Popoali'i (1/1) 35'	Report	Try: Sage Walters-Hansen 11'; Josh Setu 19'; Josh Jacomb 49'; Kaylum Boshier 60'; Vereniki Tikoisolomone 73'; Daniel Rona 80'; Con: Josh Jacomb (5/6) 12', 20', 50', 61', 80+1'; Pen: Josh Jacomb (1/1) 55'

Navigation Homes Stadium, Pukekohe
Referee: Fraser Hannon

30 August 2025
16:35 NZST

Northland	27–22	Hawke's Bay
Try: Corey Evans 40+1'; Brady Rush 47'; Sam Caird 70'; Con: Rivez Reihana (3/3) 40+2', 48', 71'; Pen: Rivez Reihana (2/2) 14', 31'	Report	Try: Nick Grigg 21'; Miracle Faiʻilagi 32'; Zarn Sullivan 59'; Con: Harry Godfrey (2/3) 22', 60'; Pen: Harry Godfrey (1/1) 66'

Semenoff Stadium, Whangārei
Referee: Nick Hogan

30 August 2025
19:05 NZST

Tasman	31–27	Otago
Try: David Havili 6'; Leicester Faingaʻanuku 35'; Tomasi Maka (2) 71', 80+1'; Con: William Havili (4/4) 7', 36', 72', 80+2'; Pen: William Havili (1/1) 22'	Report	Try: Josh Timu 13'; Dylan Pledger 32'; Henry Bell 40+3'; Con: Cam Millar (3/3) 14', 34', 40+4'; Pen: Cam Millar (2/3) 63', 78'

Trafalgar Park, Nelson
Referee: Todd Petrie

31 August 2025
14:05 NZST

Wellington	36–17	Auckland
Try: Ruben Love 2'; Xavier Numia 18'; Hugo Plummer 59'; Losi Filipo 65'; Kenshi Yamamoto 80+3'; Con: Jackson Garden-Bachop (4/5) 3', 19', 66', 80+4'; Pen: Jackson Garden-Bachop (1/2) 6'	Report	Try: Angus Taʻavao 23'; Caleb Clarke 71'; Caleb Tangitau 80'; Con: Rico Simpson (1/3) 24'

Jerry Collins Stadium, Porirua
Referee: Mike Winter

31 August 2025
16:35 NZST

Waikato	10–25	Southland – RS
Try: Manaaki Boyle-Tiatia 16'; Con: Lima Sopoaga (1/1) 16'; Pen: Lima Sopoaga (1/1) 21'	Report	Try: Semisi Tupou Ta'eiloa 29'; Nic Shearer 51'; Fletcher Morgan 60'; Con: Byron Smith (2/3) 52', 60'; Pen: Byron Smith (2/2) 5', 48'; Dan Hollinshead (0/1); Drop: Dan Hollinshead (0/1)

FMG Stadium Waikato, Hamilton
Referee: Ben O'Keeffe

=== Week 6 ===
4 September 2025
19:10 NZST

Counties Manukau	22–19	North Harbour
Try: Tevita Ofa 16'; Leo Ngatai-Tafau 56'; Gibson Popoali'i 69'; Con: Gibson Popoali'i (2/3) 17', 70'; Pen: Gibson Popoali'i (1/1) 78'	Report	Try: Luke Campbell 20'; Tima Faingaʻanuku 62'; Con: Oscar Koller (0/2); Pen: Oscar Koller (3/3) 5', 12', 51'

Navigation Homes Stadium, Pukekohe
Referee: Jordan Way (Australia)

5 September 2025
19:10 NZST

Otago	29–10	Northland
Try: Will Stodart 29'; Jae Broomfield 46'; Lucas Casey 58'; Nathan Hastie 73'; Con: Cam Millar (3/4) 30', 47', 59'; Pen: Cam Millar (1/2) 68'	Report	Try: Terrell Peita 11'; Con: Rivez Reihana (1/1) 12'; Pen: Rivez Reihana (1/1) 52'; Cards: Rob Rush (yellow card) 45'

Forsyth Barr Stadium, Dunedin
Attendance: 2,078
Referee: Ben O'Keeffe

6 September 2025
14:05 NZST

Hawke's Bay	45–19	Wellington
Try: Miracle Faiʻilagi 6'; Tom Parsons 16'; Lukas Ripley 22'; Jonah Lowe 60'; Andrew Tauatevalu 72'; Cooper Flanders 79'; Con: Harry Godfrey (3/3) 7', 17', 23'; Zarn Sullivan (3/3) 61', 72', 80'; Pen: Harry Godfrey (1/1) 30'	Report	Try: Stanley Solomon 11'; Tjay Clarke 63'; Esi Komaisavai 69'; Con: Jackson Garden-Bachop (2/3) 12', 70'

McLean Park, Napier
Attendance: 6,212
Referee: Fraser Hannon

6 September 2025
14:05 NZST

Manawatu	36–26	Waikato
Try: Mosese Bason 7'; Taine Roiri (2) 15', 52'; Taniela Filimone 27'; Kyle Brown 35'; Drew Wild 69'; Con: Drew Wild (2/5) 28', 53'; Sam Coles (1/1) 70'	Report	Try: Rui Farrant 24'; Daniel Sinkinson 29'; Gideon Wrampling 45'; Sean Ralph 61'; Con: Aaron Cruden (3/4) 25', 46', 62'

Central Energy Trust Arena, Palmerston North
Referee: Warwick Lahmert

6 September 2025
16:05 NZST

Southland	14–54	Canterbury – RS
Try: Jack Taylor 44'; Sam Fischli 71'; Con: Byron Smith (1/1) 44'; Dan Hollinshead (1/1) 72'; Cards: Faletoi Peni (yellow card) 24'	Report	Try: Corey Kellow 5'; Dallas McLeod (2) 13', 75'; Dominic Gardiner 20'; Louie Chapman (2) 25', 46'; Jamie Hannah 49'; George Bell 66'; Con: James White (7/8) 6', 14', 21', 26', 46', 50', 76'; Cards: Zach Gallagher (yellow card) 72'

Rugby Park, Invercargill
Referee: James Doleman

7 September 2025
14:05 NZST

Taranaki	17–43	Bay of Plenty
Try: Adam Lennox 47'; Hemopo Cunningham 73'; Con: Josh Jacomb (2/2) 47', 74'; Pen: Josh Jacomb (1/1) 4'; Cards: Josh Setu (yellow card) 74'	Report	Try: Ngarohi McGarvey-Black 16'; Richard Judd 20'; Naitoa Ah Kuoi 32' 32'; Fehi Fineanganofo (3) 40+1', 66', 78'; Semisi Paea 76'; Con: Kaleb Trask (3/4) 21', 33', 40+2'; Lucas Cashmore (1/3) 67'

Stadium Taranaki, New Plymouth
Referee: Stuart Curran

7 September 2025
16:35 NZST

Tasman	21–29	Auckland
Try: Macca Springer 17'; Tomasi Maka 40+2'; Levi Aumua 68'; Con: William Havili (3/3) 18', 40+3', 68'	Report	Try: Sam Hainsworth-Fa’aofo (2) 7', 12'; Caleb Tangitau 71'; Caleb Clarke 77'; Con: Rico Simpson (1/2) 8'; Xavi Taele (2/2) 72', 78'; Pen: Rico Simpson (0/1); Xavi Taele (1/1) 53'

Lansdowne Park, Blenheim
Referee: Jackson Henshaw

=== Week 7 ===
11 September 2025
19:10 NZST

Northland	43–26	Wellington
Try: Matt Moulds 4'; Jake Heenan 12'; Jordan Trainor 22'; Terrell Peita (2) 47', 56'; Nathan Salmon 78'; Con: Rivez Reihana (5/6) 13', 23', 48', 57', 80'; Pen: Rivez Reihana (1/1) 40+1'; Cards: Terrell Peita (yellow card) 28'	Report	Try: Dominic Ropeti 7'; Penalty try 28'; Esi Komaisavai 52'; Losi Filipo 59'; Con: Jackson Garden-Bachop (2/3) 8', 53'; Cards: Sione Halalilo (yellow card) 31'

Semenoff Stadium, Whangārei
Referee: Angus Gardner (Australia)

12 September 2025
19:10 NZST

Waikato	29–28	North Harbour
Try: Josh Moorby 1'; Daniel Sinkinson 27'; Tepaea Cook-Savage 66'; Gabe Robinson 74'; Con: Lima Sopoaga (2/2) 2', 28'; Tepaea Cook-Savage (1/2) 67'; Pen: Lima Sopoaga (1/1) 40+1'; Cards: Xavier Roe (yellow card) 56'	Report	Try: Jed Melvin 8'; Cameron Howell 32'; Felix Kalapu 44'; Penalty try 56'; Con: Cameron Howell (3/3) 9', 33', 44'

FMG Stadium Waikato, Hamilton
Referee: Angus Mabey

13 September 2025
14:05 NZST

Bay of Plenty	21–24 (a.e.t.)	Hawke's Bay
Try: Joe Johnston 10'; Richard Judd 30'; Kele Lasaqa 72'; Con: Lucas Cashmore (3/3) 11', 31', 73'	Report	Try: Folau Fakatava 3', 62'; Tom Parsons 26'; Con: Lincoln McClutchie (3/3) 4', 28', 63'; Drop: Lincoln McClutchie (1/1) 85'

Tauranga Domain, Tauranga
Referee: James Doleman

13 September 2025
16:05 NZST

Otago	28–26	Taranaki
Try: Josh Timu 7'; Jona Nareki 37'; Cam Millar 63'; Liam Coltman 70'; Con: Cam Millar (4/4) 8', 38', 64', 71'	Report	Try: Bradley Slater 12'; Obey Samate 33'; Kaylum Boshier 51'; Arese Poliko 57'; Con: Josh Jacomb (3/4) 12', 52', 58'; Pen: Josh Jacomb (0/1); Cards: Michael Loft (yellow card) 70'

Forsyth Barr Stadium, Dunedin
Attendance: 2,178
Referee: Todd Petrie

14 September 2025
14:05 NZST

Auckland	52–29	Manawatu
Try: Xavier Tito-Harris 13'; Xavi Taele 18'; Tai Cribb 47'; Caleb Tangitau (2) 51', 74'; Cohen Norrie 57'; AJ Lam 61'; Anton Segner 69'; Con: Xavi Taele (5/7) 19', 48', 52', 57', 70'; Rico Simpson (1/1) 75'; Pen: Xavi Taele (0/1)	Report	Try: Taniela Filimone 2'; Mosese Bason (2) 21', 49'; Jordi Viljoen 32'; Ngani Laumape 35'; Con: Drew Wild (2/5) 33', 50'

Eden Park, Auckland
Attendance: 1,300
Referee: Nick Hogan

14 September 2025
14:05 NZST

RS – Canterbury	31–25	Tasman
Try: Louie Chapman (2) 8', 34'; Chay Fihaki 39'; Sam Darry 69'; George Bell 80+3'; Con: James White (2/4) 9', 35'; Andrew Knewstubb (1/1) 80+4'; Pen: James White (0/1)	Report	Try: Mitchell Drummond 3'; David Havili 21'; Kyren Taumoefolau 56'; Tomasi Maka 60'; Con: William Havili (1/4) 4'; Pen: William Havili (1/1) 32'; Drop: David Havili (0/1)

Apollo Projects Stadium, Christchurch
Referee: Ben O'Keeffe

14 September 2025
16:35 NZST

Southland	10–64	Counties Manukau
Try: Mitchell Dunshea 14'; Scott Gregory 27'; Con: Mika Muliaina (0/2); Cards: Jack Sexton (yellow card) 44'	Report	Try: Ioane Moananu 18'; Etene Nanai-Seturo 25'; Dalton Papali'i 30'; Leo Ngatai-Tafau 40+1'; Penalty try 43'; Hoskins Sotutu 50'; Vainikolo Fifita 62'; Cameron Church 68'; Cohen Brady-Leathem 75'; Sione Molia 80'; Con: AJ Alatimu (4/5) 19', 31', 40+2', 51'; Gibson Popoali'i (2/4) 69', 76'

Rugby Park, Invercargill
Referee: Marcus Playle

=== Week 8 ===
19 September 2025
19:10 NZST

Taranaki	38–24	Hawke's Bay
Try: Bradley Slater 39'; Kaylum Boshier 49'; Josh Jacomb 56'; Vereniki Tikoisolomone 63'; Ben Dufficy 74'; Con: Josh Jacomb (5/5) 40', 50', 57', 64', 75'; Pen: Josh Jacomb (1/1) 70'	Report	Try: Neria Fomai (2) 16', 54'; Sam Smith 77'; Andrew Tauatevalu 80'; Con: Lincoln McClutchie (2/4) 54', 77'; Cards: Tom Parsons (yellow card) 38'

Stadium Taranaki, New Plymouth
Referee: Mike Winter

20 September 2025
14:05 NZST

Counties Manukau	49–28	Auckland
Try: Gibson Popoali'i (2) 11', 53'; Etene Nanai-Seturo 15'; Keran van Staden 19'; Cohen Brady-Leathem 28'; Josh Gray 35'; Cam Roigard 50'; Con: AJ Alatimu (7/7) 12', 15', 20', 29', 36', 51', 54'	Report	Try: Che Clark 25'; Cohen Norrie 40+2'; Mills Sanerivi 47'; Caleb Clarke 59'; Con: Rico Simpson (4/4) 26', 40+3', 47', 60'

Navigation Homes Stadium, Pukekohe
Referee: Angus Mabey

20 September 2025
14:05 NZST

Wellington	75–19	Southland
Try: James O'Reilly 3'; Callum Harkin (3) 15', 38', 80+1'; Caleb Delany 22'; Losi Filipo 25'; Dominic Ropeti (2) 27', 62'; Stanley Solomon (2) 56', 73'; Siale Lauaki 68'; Con: Jackson Garden-Bachop (7/7) 4', 16', 23', 26', 28', 39', 57'; Ruben Love (3/4) 62', 69', 74'	Report	Try: Michael Manson 13'; Nic Souchon 50'; Paula Latu 70'; Con: Mika Muliaina (1/2) 51'; Byron Smith (1/1) 71'

Jerry Collins Stadium, Porirua
Referee: Stuart Curran

20 September 2025
16:35 NZST

Canterbury	36–38	Otago – RS
Try: Torian Barnes 4'; George Bell 14'; Tom Christie 22'; Kurtis MacDonald 31'; Chay Fihaki 50'; Andrew Knewstubb 53'; Con: James White (2/4) 5', 15'; Chay Fihaki (1/2) 51'	Report	Try: Sam Nemec-Vial 18'; Joseva Tamani 26'; Lucas Casey (2) 43', 62'; Jae Broomfield 57'; Liam Coltman 66'; Con: Cam Millar (4/6) 19', 27', 44', 67'; Cards: Will Tucker (yellow card) 60'

Apollo Projects Stadium, Christchurch
Referee: Marcus Playle

20 September 2025
19:10 NZST

Tasman	24–29 (a.e.t.)	Waikato
Try: Tomasi Maka (2) 10', 38'; Cooper Roberts 71'; Eli Oudenryn 80+3'; Con: Cooper Grant (2/2) 11', 39'; William Havili (0/2); Pen: William Havili (0/1)	Report	Try: George Dyer 5'; Daniel Sinkinson (2) 16', 55'; Senita Lauaki 29'; Josh Moorby 87'; Con: Lima Sopoaga (2/4) 6', 30'; Pen: Lima Sopoaga (0/1)

Lansdowne Park, Blenheim
Referee: Ben O'Keeffe

21 September 2025
14:05 NZST

North Harbour	21–22	Northland
Try: Tima Faingaʻanuku 4'; Tom Barham 9'; Jed Melvin 49'; Con: Cameron Howell (3/3) 5', 10', 50'; Cards: Kade Banks (yellow card) 35'; Jack Lee (yellow card) 59'	Report	Try: Brady Rush 19'; Jordan Hutchings 32'; Rob Rush 39'; Con: Rivez Reihana (2/3) 33', 40'; Pen: Rivez Reihana (1/1) 80'

North Harbour Stadium, Albany
Referee: Warwick Lahmert

21 September 2025
16:35 NZST

Manawatu	19–55	Bay of Plenty
Try: Taniela Filimone (2) 25', 74'; Kyle Brown 80'; Con: Brett Cameron (1/1) 26'; Sam Coles (1/2) 75'	Report	Try: Tevita Mafileo (2) 4', 18'; Kele Lasaqa (2) 6', 28'; Fehi Fineanganofo (2) 35', 44'; Lalomilo Lalomilo 47'; Jacob Norris 52'; Cole Forbes 68'; Con: Lucas Cashmore (5/9) 19', 29', 35', 48', 53'

Central Energy Trust Arena, Palmerston North
Referee: Todd Petrie

=== Week 9 ===
25 September 2025
19:10 NZST

Hawke's Bay	45–28	Auckland
Try: Lincoln McClutchie 6'; Devan Flanders (2) 21', 37'; Miracle Faiʻilagi 31'; Le Roux Malan (2) 46', 66'; Lukas Ripley 74'; Con: Lincoln McClutchie (5/6) 7', 22', 31', 47', 66'; Zarn Sullivan (0/1)	Report	Try: Xavier Tito-Harris 19'; Xavi Taele 63'; Tanielu Teleʻa 69'; Soane Vikena 77'; Con: Rico Simpson (4/4) 20', 64', 69', 78'

McLean Park, Napier
Referee: Ben O'Keeffe

26 September 2025
19:10 NZST

Southland	38–55	Tasman
Try: Semisi Tupou Ta'eiloa 13'; Michael Manson (3) 47', 74', 79'; Paula Latu 50'; Caleb Karangaroa 60'; Con: Mika Muliaina (2/2) 14', 47'; Dan Hollinshead (2/4) 51', 60'	Report	Try: Tomasi Maka (2) 4', 8'; David Havili (2) 17', 25'; Kyren Taumoefolau (3) 21', 37', 40+1'; Ryan Coxon 57'; Macca Springer 70'; Con: William Havili (5/9) 9', 22', 26', 58', 71'

Rugby Park, Invercargill
Referee: Fraser Hannon

27 September 2025
13:05 NZST

RS – Otago	41–26	North Harbour
Try: Dylan Pledger (2) 2', 61'; Christian Lio-Willie 30'; Liam Coltman 39'; Lucas Casey 57'; Con: Cam Millar (5/5) 3', 31', 40', 58', 62'; Pen: Cam Millar (2/2) 77', 80'	Report	Try: Ben Brownlee 12'; Mark Tele'a 19'; Sofai Maka 71'; Tom Barham 74'; Con: Cameron Howell (3/4) 13', 20', 75'

Forsyth Barr Stadium, Dunedin
Attendance: 5,821
Referee: Jackson Henshaw
Fraser Hannon

27 September 2025
14:05 NZST

Taranaki	39–20	Wellington
Try: Bradley Slater 37'; Kaylum Boshier 43'; Jesse Parete 45'; Logan Crowley 46'; Penalty try 57'; Con: Josh Jacomb (3/4) 44', 45', 47'; Pen: Josh Jacomb (2/2) 21', 34'; Cards: Vereniki Tikoisolomone (yellow card) 25'	Report	Try: Dominic Ropeti 52'; Callum Harkin 80+1'; Con: Jackson Garden-Bachop (2/2) 53', 80+1'; Pen: Jackson Garden-Bachop (2/2) 11', 24'

Stadium Taranaki, New Plymouth
Referee: James Doleman

28 September 2025
14:05 NZDT

Bay of Plenty	41–5	Waikato
Try: Filipe Vakasiuola 11'; Fehi Fineanganofo (2) 28', 38'; Kele Lasaqa 34'; Kurt Eklund 65'; Kees Kolose 78'; Con: Lucas Cashmore (4/6) 12', 29', 35', 79'; Pen: Lucas Cashmore (1/1) 8'	Report	Try: Bailyn Sullivan 56'; Con: Aaron Cruden (0/1)

Tauranga Domain, Tauranga
Referee: Marcus Playle

28 September 2025
14:05 NZDT

Counties Manukau	48–24	Manawatu
Try: Ioane Moananu (2) 10', 21'; Gibson Popoali'i (3) 31', 61', 80'; Josh Gray 38'; Etene Nanai-Seturo 77'; Con: AJ Alatimu (5/5) 11', 22', 32', 39', 62'; Gibson Popoali'i (0/2); Pen: AJ Alatimu (1/1) 42'	Report	Try: Ngani Laumape 13'; TK Howden 35'; James Tofa 45'; Taofuka Paongo 75'; Con: Sam Coles (2/4) 45', 75'

Navigation Homes Stadium, Pukekohe
Referee: Mike Winter

28 September 2025
16:35 NZDT

Northland	19–19 (a.e.t.)	Canterbury
Try: Jordan Trainor 29'; Terrell Peita 59'; Rob Rush 79'; Con: Rivez Reihana (2/3) 60', 80'	Report	Try: Kurtis MacDonald 5'; Shun Miyake 40+1'; Manasa Mataele 69'; Con: Shun Miyake (1/2) 40+2'; Andrew Knewstubb (1/1) 70'; Pen: Andrew Knewstubb (0/1); Cards: Daniel Lienert-Brown (yellow card) 55'; Dominic Gardiner (yellow card) 58'

Semenoff Stadium, Whangārei
Referee: Paul Williams

=== Week 10 ===
3 October 2025
19:10 NZDT

North Harbour	15–14	Southland
Try: Jed Melvin 31'; Siaosi Nginingini 74'; Con: Cameron Howell (1/2) 31'; Pen: Cameron Howell (1/1) 46'	Report	Try: Ale Aho 8'; Nic Souchon 26'; Con: Mika Muliaina (2/2) 8', 27'; Cards: Jack Sexton (yellow card) 49'

North Harbour Stadium, Albany
Referee: Mike Winter

4 October 2025
14:05 NZDT

Auckland	17–51	Otago
Try: Cohen Norrie 6'; Caleb Tangitau 49'; Sam Hainsworth-Fa’aofo 76'; Con: Rico Simpson (1/3) 77'; Cards: Angus Taʻavao (yellow card) 40'	Report	Try: Nathan Hastie 4'; Thomas Umaga-Jensen 24'; Cam Millar 27'; Penalty try 40'; Sam Nemec-Vial 66'; A-One Lolofie 73'; Con: Cam Millar (5/5) 5', 25', 28', 68', 74'; Pen: Cam Millar (3/3) 43', 55', 80'

Eden Park, Auckland
Referee: Todd Petrie

4 October 2025
14:05 NZDT

Wellington	26–33	Bay of Plenty
Try: Julian Savea 9'; Sione Halalilo 21'; Stanley Solomon (2) 26', 68'; Con: Jackson Garden-Bachop (3/4) 10', 22', 28'	Report	Try: Charlie Sinton (2) 33', 41'; Fehi Fineanganofo 48'; Ngarohi McGarvey-Black 63'; Reon Paul 73'; Con: Seamus Bardoul (4/5) 34', 42', 49', 74'

Jerry Collins Stadium, Porirua
Referee: Stuart Curran

4 October 2025
16:35 NZDT

Waikato	25–19	Northland
Try: Oli Mathis 20'; Malachi Wrampling-Alec 38'; Waisake Salabiau 47'; Con: Aaron Cruden (2/3) 21', 39'; Pen: Aaron Cruden (2/2) 59', 69'; Cards: Malachi Wrampling-Alec (yellow card) 14'	Report	Try: Matt Moulds 6'; Terrell Peita 14'; Jordan Trainor 55'; Con: Jade Stewart (2/3) 7', 55'

FMG Stadium Waikato, Hamilton
Referee: James Doleman

4 October 2025
19:10 NZDT

Manawatu	10–38	Hawke's Bay
Try: Vernon Bason 59'; James Tofa 65'; Con: Drew Wild (0/2)	Report	Try: Anaru Paenga-Morgan 3'; Neria Fomai (2) 29', 76'; Zarn Sullivan 40+1'; Jacob Devery 54'; Devan Flanders 61'; Con: Lincoln McClutchie (4/5) 4', 30', 40+2', 55'; Zarn Sullivan (0/1)

Central Energy Trust Arena, Palmerston North
Referee: Marcus Playle

5 October 2025
14:05 NZDT

Tasman	41–49	Counties Manukau
Try: Cooper Roberts (2) 16', 42'; Quinten Strange 25'; Kyren Taumoefolau 33'; Will Thornalley 55'; Macca Springer 66'; Tone Ng Shiu 76'; Con: William Havili (3/6) 17', 34', 43'; Cooper Grant (0/1)	Report	Try: Keran van Staden 9'; Cohen Brady-Leathem 14'; Adam Brash (3) 21', 38', 44'; Etene Nanai-Seturo (2) 47', 53'; Con: AJ Alatimu (4/7) 22', 39', 45', 53'; Pen: AJ Alatimu (2/2) 29', 69'

Trafalgar Park, Nelson
Referee: Paul Williams

5 October 2025
16:35 NZDT

Canterbury	34–14	Taranaki
Try: Zach Gallagher (3) 5', 35', 40'; Chay Fihaki 19'; George Bell 43'; Daniel Lienert-Brown 79'; Con: Chay Fihaki (2/6) 36', 80'	Report	Try: Adam Lennox 26'; Arese Poliko 50'; Con: Josh Jacomb (2/2) 27', 51'

Apollo Projects Stadium, Christchurch
Referee: Ben O'Keeffe

== Play-offs ==
Quarter-finals
1	Canterbury	23
8	Counties Manukau	15
4	Hawke's Bay	26
5	Taranaki	12
2	Otago	44
7	Waikato	41
3	Bay of Plenty	27
6	Tasman	7

Semi-finals
Canterbury	43
Hawke's Bay	19
Otago	41
Bay of Plenty	17

Final
Canterbury	36
Otago	28

=== Quarter-finals ===
10 October 2025
19:10 NZDT

Otago	44–41	Waikato
Try: Dylan Pledger (2) 5', 41'; Jae Broomfield 29'; Will Stodart 34'; Lucas Casey 47'; Sam Gilbert 57'; Con: Cam Millar (4/6) 30', 36', 42', 58'; Pen: Cam Millar (1/1) 80+2'; Drop: Sam Gilbert (1/1) 68'; Cards: Benjamin Lopas (yellow card) 76'	Report	Try: Oli Mathis 13'; Samipeni Finau 22'; Tepaea Cook-Savage 53'; Sean Ralph (2) 66', 79'; Charlie Marsh 73'; Con: Aaron Cruden (2/3) 23', 54'; Tepaea Cook-Savage (2/3) 73', 79'; Pen: Aaron Cruden (1/1) 9'; Cards: Luke Jacobson (yellow card) 28'

Forsyth Barr Stadium, Dunedin
Attendance: 4,739
Referee: Ben O'Keeffe

11 October 2025
16:10 NZDT

Bay of Plenty	27–7	Tasman
Try: Kele Lasaqa 47'; Fehi Fineanganofo 60'; Penalty try 65'; Con: Lucas Cashmore (2/2) 48', 61'; Pen: Lucas Cashmore (2/2) 25', 40+2'	Report	Try: Kyren Taumoefolau 30'; Con: William Havili (1/1) 31'; Cards: William Havili (yellow card) 65'

Tauranga Domain, Tauranga
Referee: James Doleman

11 October 2025
19:10 NZDT

Hawke's Bay	26–12	Taranaki
Try: Le Roux Malan 28'; Miracle Faiʻilagi 34'; Lincoln McClutchie 53'; Sam Smith 66'; Con: Lincoln McClutchie (3/4) 30', 35', 67'; Pen: Lincoln McClutchie (0/1); Cards: Folau Fakatava (yellow card) 37'; Isaia Walker-Leawere (yellow card) 71'	Report	Pen: Josh Jacomb (4/4) 16', 39', 45', 62'; Cards: Kaylum Boshier (yellow card) 51'

McLean Park, Napier
Referee: Todd Petrie

12 October 2025
14:10 NZDT

Canterbury	23–15 (a.e.t.)	Counties Manukau
Try: Jamie Hannah 22'; Braydon Ennor 51'; Chay Fihaki 87'; Con: Chay Fihaki (1/3) 52'; Pen: Chay Fihaki (2/4) 46', 94'; Drop: Andrew Knewstubb (0/1)	Report	Try: Gibson Popoali'i 25'; Ioane Moananu 30'; Con: Gibson Popoali'i (1/2) 31'; Pen: Gibson Popoali'i (1/1) 18'

Apollo Projects Stadium, Christchurch
Referee: Fraser Hannon

=== Semi-finals ===
17 October 2025
19:15 NZDT

Otago	41–17	Bay of Plenty
Try: Jona Nareki 14'; Christian Lio-Willie 21'; Will Stodart 38'; Dylan Pledger 46'; Finn Hurley 66'; Con: Cam Millar (5/5) 15', 22', 39', 47', 67'; Pen: Cam Millar (1/1) 59'; Sam Gilbert (1/1) 78'; Cards: Jae Broomfield (yellow card) 33'	Report	Try: Veveni Lasaqa 9'; Cole Forbes 18'; Ngarohi McGarvey-Black 72'; Con: Lucas Cashmore (1/3) 19'

Forsyth Barr Stadium, Dunedin
Attendance: 10,764
Referee: Paul Williams

18 October 2025
19:10 NZDT

Canterbury	43–19	Hawke's Bay
Try: Ngane Punivai 9'; Sam Darry 18'; Dallas McLeod (2) 51', 57'; Daniel Lienert-Brown 66'; Tom Christie 78'; Con: Chay Fihaki (5/6) 19', 52', 58', 67', 79'; Pen: Chay Fihaki (1/1) 5'; Cards: Ngane Punivai (yellow card) 20'	Report	Try: Neria Fomai 25'; Folau Fakatava 34'; Jonah Lowe 70'; Con: Lincoln McClutchie (2/3) 26', 35'

Apollo Projects Stadium, Christchurch
Referee: Ben O'Keeffe

=== Final ===
25 October 2025
16:05 NZDT

Canterbury	36–28	Otago
Try: Dallas McLeod 9'; Brodie McAlister 25'; Manasa Mataele 45'; Braydon Ennor 52'; Louie Chapman 58'; Gus Brown 69'; Con: Chay Fihaki (3/6) 46', 53', 59'	Report	Try: Thomas Umaga-Jensen 5'; Lucas Casey 19'; Benjamin Lopas 63'; Jona Nareki 78'; Con: Cam Millar (3/3) 6', 20', 63'; Finn Hurley (1/1) 78'

Apollo Projects Stadium, Christchurch
Referee: James Doleman

Canterbury	Otago

FB	15	Chay Fihaki
RW	14	Manasa Mataele
OC	13	Braydon Ennor
IC	12	Dallas McLeod	(substituted off) 68'
LW	11	Ngane Punivai
FH	10	Andrew Knewstubb	(substituted off) 77'
SH	9	Louie Chapman	(substituted off) 77'
N8	8	Dominic Gardiner
OF	7	Tom Christie (c)
BF	6	Zach Gallagher
RL	5	Jamie Hannah	(substituted off) 75'
LL	4	Liam Jack	(substituted off) 68'
TP	3	Seb Calder	(substituted off) 64'
HK	2	Brodie McAlister	(substituted off) 71'
LP	1	Finlay Brewis	(substituted off) 60'
Replacements:
HK	16	Nick Hyde	(substituted on) 71'
PR	17	Daniel Lienert-Brown	(substituted on) 60'
PR	18	Gus Brown	(substituted on) 64'
LK	19	Tahlor Cahill	(substituted on) 75'
FL	20	Torian Barnes	(substituted on) 68'
SH	21	Tyson Belworthy	(substituted on) 77'
CE	22	Shun Miyake	(substituted on) 77'
WG	23	Jone Rova	(substituted on) 68'

FB	15	Sam Gilbert (c)
RW	14	Jae Broomfield	(substituted off) 60'
OC	13	Josh Timu	(substituted off) 56'
IC	12	Thomas Umaga-Jensen
LW	11	Jona Nareki
FH	10	Cam Millar
SH	9	Dylan Pledger	(substituted off) 77'
N8	8	Christian Lio-Willie
OF	7	Lucas Casey	(substituted off) 75'
BF	6	Will Stodart
RL	5	Oliver Haig	(substituted off) 50'
LL	4	Will Tucker
TP	3	Rohan Wingham	(substituted off) 73'
HK	2	Nic Souchon	(substituted off) 40'
LP	1	Abraham Pole	(substituted off) 60'
Replacements:
HK	16	Liam Coltman	(substituted on) 40'
PR	17	Benjamin Lopas	(substituted on) 60'
PR	18	Moana Takataka	(substituted on) 73'
LK	19	Joseva Tamani	(substituted on) 50'
FL	20	Harry Taylor	(substituted on) 75'
SH	21	Nathan Hastie	(substituted on) 77'
FH	22	Josh Whaanga	(substituted on) 56'
WG	23	Finn Hurley	(substituted on) 60'

== Statistics ==
=== Leading point scorers ===
No.	Player	Team	Points	Average	Details
1	Cam Millar	Otago	156	12.00	3 T, 51 C, 13 P, 0 D
2	Josh Jacomb	Taranaki	133	12.09	6 T, 32 C, 13 P, 0 D
3	Jackson Garden-Bachop	Wellington	88	8.80	1 T, 34 C, 5 P, 0 D
4	William Havili	Tasman	75	6.82	1 T, 32 C, 2 P, 0 D
5	Rivez Reihana	Northland	73	8.11	1 T, 22 C, 8 P, 0 D
6	Chay Fihaki	Canterbury	68	6.18	5 T, 17 C, 3 P, 0 D
7	Gibson Popoali'i	Counties Manukau	65	6.50	8 T, 8 C, 3 P, 0 D
7	Kaleb Trask	Bay of Plenty	65	10.83	3 T, 13 C, 8 P, 0 D
9	Lincoln McClutchie	Hawke's Bay	58	6.44	3 T, 20 C, 0 P, 1 D
10	Harry Godfrey	Hawke's Bay	53	8.83	1 T, 18 C, 4 P, 0 D

Source: The weekly reviews of the matches published on provincial.rugby (see "Report" in the individual match scoring stats).

=== Leading try scorers ===
No.	Player	Team	Tries	Average
1	Lucas Casey	Otago	9	0.75
1	Fehi Fineanganofo	Bay of Plenty	9	0.90
1	Tomasi Maka	Tasman	9	0.82
4	Taniela Filimone	Manawatu	8	0.80
4	Dylan Pledger	Otago	8	0.73
4	Gibson Popoali'i	Counties Manukau	8	0.80
4	Stanley Solomon	Wellington	8	0.89
4	Macca Springer	Tasman	8	0.89
4	Xavier Tito-Harris	Auckland	8	1.00
10	10 players		6	

Source: The weekly reviews of the matches published on provincial.rugby (see "Report" in the individual match scoring stats).

=== Points by game ===
Team	1		2		3		4		5		6		7		8		9		10		Total		Average	
Auckland	35	36	15	19	8	50	24	43	17	36	29	21	52	29	28	49	28	45	17	51	253	379	25.30	37.90
Bay of Plenty	37	7	39	22	7	21	25	30	19	7	43	17	21	24	55	19	41	5	33	26	320	178	32.00	17.80
Canterbury	33	15	19	15	21	7	26	7	53	14	54	14	31	25	36	38	19	19	34	14	326	168	32.60	16.80
Counties Manukau	14	54	22	39	26	27	19	33	22	43	22	19	64	10	49	28	48	24	49	41	335	318	33.50	31.80
Hawke's Bay	54	14	27	21	36	22	7	26	22	27	45	19	24	21	24	38	45	28	38	10	322	226	32.20	22.60
Manawatu	38	25	17	49	22	29	38	28	14	53	36	26	29	52	19	55	24	48	10	38	247	403	24.70	40.30
North Harbour	25	38	24	46	22	36	19	43	7	19	19	22	28	29	21	22	26	41	15	14	206	310	20.60	31.00
Northland	3	23	22	17	14	28	43	24	27	22	10	29	43	26	22	21	19	19	19	25	222	234	22.20	23.40
Otago	24	15	21	27	46	41	33	19	27	31	29	10	28	26	38	36	41	26	51	17	338	248	33.80	24.80
Southland	15	24	17	22	29	22	30	25	25	10	14	54	10	64	19	75	38	55	14	15	211	366	21.10	36.60
Taranaki	23	3	46	24	50	8	22	23	43	22	17	43	26	28	38	24	39	20	14	34	318	229	31.80	22.90
Tasman	7	37	49	17	28	14	43	19	31	27	21	29	25	31	24	29	55	38	41	49	324	290	32.40	29.00
Waikato	36	35	24	35	27	26	23	22	10	25	26	36	29	28	29	24	5	41	25	19	234	291	23.40	29.10
Wellington	15	33	35	24	41	46	28	38	36	17	19	45	26	43	75	19	20	39	26	33	321	337	32.10	33.70

Source: Bunnings NPC Fixtures and Results 2025

=== Tries by game ===
Team	1		2		3		4		5		6		7		8		9		10		Total		Average	
Auckland	4	6	3	3	1	7	4	6	3	5	4	3	8	5	4	7	4	7	3	6	38	55	3.80	5.50
Bay of Plenty	5	1	5	4	1	33	3	3	2	1	7	2	3	3	9	3	6	1	5	4	46	25	4.60	2.50
Canterbury	5	2	3	3	3	1	4	1	9	2	8	2	5	4	6	6	3	3	6	2	52	26	5.20	2.60
Counties Manukau	2	8	4	5	4	3	3	5	3	6	3	2	10	2	7	4	7	4	7	7	50	46	5.00	4.60
Hawke's Bay	8	2	3	3	6	3	1	4	3	3	6	3	3	3	4	5	7	4	6	2	47	32	4.70	3.20
Manawatu	5	3	3	7	3	4	6	4	2	9	6	4	5	8	3	9	4	7	2	6	39	61	3.90	6.10
North Harbour	3	5	4	8	3	6	3	7	1	2	2	3	4	4	3	3	4	5	2	2	29	45	2.90	4.50
Northland	0	3	3	2	2	4	6	4	3	3	1	4	6	4	3	3	3	3	3	3	30	33	3.00	3.30
Otago	3	2	3	3	6	6	5	3	3	4	4	1	4	4	6	6	5	4	6	3	45	36	4.50	3.60
Southland	2	3	2	3	4	3	3	3	3	1	2	8	2	10	3	11	6	9	2	2	29	53	2.90	5.30
Taranaki	3	0	8	4	7	1	3	2	6	3	2	7	4	4	5	4	5	2	2	6	45	33	4.50	3.30
Tasman	1	5	7	3	4	2	7	3	4	3	3	4	4	5	4	5	9	6	7	7	50	43	5.00	4.30
Waikato	6	4	4	5	3	4	2	3	1	3	4	6	4	4	5	4	1	6	3	3	33	42	3.30	4.20
Wellington	2	5	5	4	6	6	4	6	5	3	3	6	4	6	11	3	2	5	4	5	46	49	4.60	4.90

For	Against

Source: The weekly reviews of the matches published on provincial.rugby (see "Report" in the individual match scoring stats).

=== Discipline ===
Player	Team	Red	Yellow	Sent off match(es)
Jack Sexton	Southland	0	2	Week 7 (vs. Counties Manukau); Week 10 (vs. North Harbour)
Austin Anderson	Waikato	0	1	Week 1 (vs. Auckland)
Kade Banks	North Harbour	0	1	Week 8 (vs. Northland)
Kaylum Boshier	Taranaki	0	1	Quarter-final (vs. Hawke's Bay)
Jae Broomfield	Otago	0	1	Semi-final (vs. Bay of Plenty)
Logan Crowley	Taranaki	0	1	Week 2 (vs. North Harbour)
Kurt Eklund	Bay of Plenty	0	1	Week 2 (vs. Counties Manukau)
Folau Fakatava	Hawke's Bay	0	1	Quarter-final (vs. Taranaki)
Zach Gallagher	Canterbury	0	1	Week 6 (vs. Southland)
Dominic Gardiner	Canterbury	0	1	Week 9 (vs. Northland)
Sam Gilbert	Otago	0	1	Week 1 (vs. Southland)
Sione Halalilo	Wellington	0	1	Week 7 (vs. Northland)
William Havili	Tasman	0	1	Quarter-final (vs. Bay of Plenty)
Luke Jacobson	Waikato	0	1	Quarter-final (vs. Otago)
Oscar Koller	North Harbour	0	1	Week 2 (vs. Taranaki)
Jack Lee	North Harbour	0	1	Week 8 (vs. Northland)
Daniel Lienert-Brown	Canterbury	0	1	Week 9 (vs. Northland)
Michael Loft	Taranaki	0	1	Week 7 (vs. Otago)
Benjamin Lopas	Otago	0	1	Quarter-final (vs. Waikato)
Jonah Lowe	Hawke's Bay	0	1	Week 1 (vs. Counties Manukau)
Jesse Parete	Taranaki	0	1	Week 4 (vs. Waikato)
Tom Parsons	Hawke's Bay	0	1	Week 8 (vs. Taranaki)
Terrell Peita	Northland	0	1	Week 7 (vs. Wellington)
Faletoi Peni	Southland	0	1	Week 6 (vs. Canterbury)
Ngane Punivai	Canterbury	0	1	Semi-final (vs. Hawke's Bay)
Xavier Roe	Waikato	0	1	Week 7 (vs. North Harbour)
Brady Rush	Northland	0	1	Week 4 (vs. Auckland)
Rob Rush	Northland	0	1	Week 6 (vs. Otago)
Tom Savage	North Harbour	0	1	Week 5 (vs. Bay of Plenty)
Josh Setu	Taranaki	0	1	Week 6 (vs. Bay of Plenty)
Angus Taʻavao	Auckland	0	1	Week 10 (vs. Otago)
Josh Te Hira	Tasman	0	1	Week 1 (vs. Bay of Plenty)
Vereniki Tikoisolomone	Taranaki	0	1	Week 9 (vs. Wellington)
Kaleb Trask	Bay of Plenty	0	1	Week 2 (vs. Counties Manukau)
Will Tucker	Otago	0	1	Week 8 (vs. Canterbury)
Isaia Walker-Leawere	Hawke's Bay	0	1	Quarter-final (vs. Taranaki)
Malachi Wrampling-Alec	Waikato	0	1	Week 10 (vs. Northland)

== Ranfurly Shield ==
=== Pre-season challenges ===
On 3 March 2025, Taranaki Rugby announced that 2024 Lochore Cup winners King Country would be the first Heartland Championship team to challenge Taranaki for the Ranfurly Shield in 2025. The game would be played at the fully re-developed Stadium Taranaki (formerly Yarrow Stadium) on 11 June 2025. Three days later, Taranaki Rugby confirmed that the second pre-season Ranfurly Shield game would be played at Manaia Domain in Manaia on 19 July 2025 against 2024 Meads Cup winners Thames Valley.

11 June 2025
18:00 NZST

Taranaki	78–7	King Country
Try: JJ Pokai (2) 11', 25'; Keightley Watson 15'; Brayton Northcott-Hill 21'; Vereniki Tikoisolomone (3) 41', 54', 60'; Adam Lennox (3) 47', 49', 77'; Meihana Grindlay 65'; Jack Wiseman 70'; Con: Brayton Northcott-Hill (6/7) 12', 16', 22', 26', 42', 49'; Jack Wiseman (1/1) 55'; Jack Parker (2/4) 66', 71'	Report	Try: Tom Ryan 38'; Con: Kieron Rollinson (1/1) 39'

Stadium Taranaki, New Plymouth
Referee: Angus Mabey

19 July 2025
14:00 NZST

Taranaki	97–0	Thames Valley
Try: Logan Crowley (2) 3', 79'; Bradley Slater 13'; Taniela Rakuro (5) 18', 28', 58', 64', 70'; Michael Loft (2) 25', 40'; Josh Lord 37'; Josh Jacomb 44'; Vereniki Tikoisolomone (2) 52', 68'; Meihana Grindlay 56'; Con: Josh Jacomb (5/8) 4', 19', 29', 38', 45'; Adam Lennox (0/1); Brayton Northcott-Hill (5/5) 57', 59', 65', 69', 71'; Meihana Grindlay (1/1) 80'	Report

Manaia Domain, Manaia
Referee: Stuart Curran
