= 2024 U20 Rugby Championship =

International Rugby Championship

Tournament details
- Host: Australia
- Date: 2–12 May 2024
- Countries: Argentina; Australia; New Zealand; South Africa

Final positions
- Champions: New Zealand (1st title)

Tournament statistics
- Matches played: 6
- Tries scored: 37 (6.17 per match)
- Top scorer(s): Franco Rossetto (20)
- Most tries: Franco Rossetto (4)

The 2024 U20 Rugby Championship, also known as the 2024 TRC U20, was the first edition of the rugby union competition, the U20 Rugby Championship, the under-20 equivalent of The Rugby Championship, played by senior men's teams of Argentina, Australia, New Zealand, and South Africa. The first edition consisted of three rounds in which all teams played each other at a single venue (in Australia), with the table leaders New Zealand being crowned winners.

== Venue ==
The venue was announced in March 2024 to be the Sunshine Coast Stadium in Bokarina, located in South East Queensland.

Bokarina (Sunshine Coast)
Sunshine Coast Stadium
Capacity: 10,000
2024 U20 Rugby Championship is located in Queensland	2024 U20 Rugby Championship is located in Australia

== Table ==
Pos	Team	Pld	W	D	L	PF	PA	PD	TF	TA	TB	LB	Pts
1	New Zealand (C)	3	2	1	0	92	58	+34	13	7	1	0	11
2	South Africa	3	1	1	1	62	65	−3	8	9	0	1	7
3	Argentina	3	1	0	2	73	79	−6	10	10	1	1	6
4	Australia (H)	3	1	0	2	55	80	−25	6	11	0	0	4

Source: All Rugby
(C) Champion; (H) Host

== Fixtures ==
=== Round 1 ===
2 May
17:00 AEST (UTC+10)

New Zealand	13–13	South Africa
Try: Solomon 53' m Vaenuku 78' m Con: Simpson (0/2); Pen: Hutchinson (1/2) 30'	Report	Try: Leotlela 58' c Con: Sefoor (1/1) 59'; Pen: Sefoor (2/3) 57', 63'; Cards: van Heerden (yellow card) 72'

Sunshine Coast Stadium
Referee: Jordan Kaminski (Australia)

2 May
19:00 AEST (UTC+10)

Australia	6–25	Argentina (1 BP)
Pen: Fowler (2/3) 7', 59'; Cards: Harley (yellow card) 36' to 46'	Report	Try: Rapetti 38' c Pedro Bernasconi 42' m Rossi 77' c Con: Di Lucca (1/2) 39'; Fossati (1/1) 78'; Pen: Di Lucca (2/4) 9', 45'; Cards: Sánchez Valarolo (yellow card) 50' to 60'

Sunshine Coast Stadium
Referee: Griffin Colby (South Africa)

=== Round 2 ===
7 May
17:00 AEST (UTC+10)

(1 BP) New Zealand	43–20	Argentina
Try: Pledger (2) 1' c, 62' c Wrampling-Alec (2) 5' c, 24' c A. Smith 44' c O'Donovan 67' m Con: Simpson (5/5) 1', 6', 25', 45', 63'; Grant (0/1); Pen: Simpson (1/1) 35'	Report	Try: Elías 29' m Manuel Vivas 50' m Torrado 55' c Con: Fossati (0/2); Di Lucca (1/1) 56'; Pen: Fossati (1/2) 19'; Cards: Asevedo (yellow card) 23' to 33'

Sunshine Coast Stadium
Referee: George Myers (Australia)

7 May
19:00 AEST (UTC+10)

Australia	24–19	South Africa (1 BP)
Try: Wilcox (2) 34' c, 65' c Penalty try 72'; Con: Wilcox (1/1) 35'; Fowler (1/1) 66'; Pen: Gray (1/2) 28'	Report	Try: van Heerden 31' c Bester (2) 62' c, 77' m Con: Williams (2/3) 32', 63'; Cards: Maqubela (red card) 19'; Hlekani (yellow card) 73'

Sunshine Coast Stadium
Referee: Angus Mabey (New Zealand)

=== Round 3 ===
12 May
13:30 AEST (UTC+10)

South Africa	30–28	Argentina (1 BP)
Try: Julius 1' c Jacobs 47' c Badenhorst 58' m Porthen 70' m Con: van Niekerk (2/4) 2', 48'; Pen: van Niekerk (2/2) 68', 81'; Cards: Ezekiel Ngobeni (yellow card) 33' to 43'	Report	Try: Rossetto (4) 27' c, 35' c, 42' c, 74' c Con: Rodríguez (3/3) 28', 36', 43'; Di Lucca (1/1) 75'; Pen: Rodríguez (0/1); Di Lucca (0/1); Drop: Rodríguez (0/1); Cards: Gael Galván (yellow card) 67' to 77'

Sunshine Coast Stadium
Referee: Dan Waenga (New Zealand)

12 May
15:30 AEST (UTC+10)

Australia	25–36	New Zealand
Try: Sawers 49' c McCulloch (2) 56' c, 59' m Con: McLaughlin-Phillips (2/3) 49', 57'; Pen: McLaughlin-Phillips (2/2) 4', 30'	Report	Try: Solomon (2) 18' m, 36' c Pledger 43' c Letiu 66' c Taele 77' c Con: Simpson (3/4) 37', 44', 67'; Coles (1/1) 78'; Pen: Coles (1/1) 72'; Cards: Maxwell (yellow card) 53' to 63'; Simpson (yellow card) 69' to 79'

Sunshine Coast Stadium
Referee: Nehuén Jauri Rivero (Argentina)

== Statistics ==
As of 12 May 2024.

=== Points scorers ===
Pos.	Name	Team	Pts.
1	Franco Rossetto	Argentina	20
2	Rico Simpson	New Zealand	19
3	Stanley Solomon	New Zealand	15
3	Dylan Pledger	New Zealand	15
5	Santino Di Lucca	Argentina	12
6	Harry McLaughlin-Phillips	Australia	10
6	Wrampling-Alec	New Zealand	10
6	Will McCulloch	Australia	10
6	Litelihle Bester	South Africa	10
6	Philip-Albert van Niekerk	South Africa	10

=== Try scorers ===
Pos.	Name	Team	Tries
1	Franco Rossetto	Argentina	4
2	Stanley Solomon	New Zealand	3
2	Dylan Pledger	New Zealand	3
4	Multiple players		2

== See also ==
- 2024 World Rugby U20 Championship
- 2024 Six Nations U20 Championship
