= Canterbury (National Provincial Championship) =

New Zealand professional rugby union team

- CRFU emblem
- Union: Canterbury Rugby Football Union
- Nickname(s): Red and Blacks
- Founded: 1879; 147 years ago
- Location: St Albans, Christchurch, New Zealand
- Ground: One New Zealand Stadium (Capacity: 25,000)
- CEO: Tony Smail
- Coach: Alex Robertson
- Captain: Brodie McAlister
- Most appearances: Robbie Deans (146)
- Top scorer: Robbie Deans (1,625)
- Most tries: Paula Bale (93)
- League: National Provincial Championship
- 2025: 1st Champions
Team kit

Official website
- www.canterburyrugby.co.nz

Canterbury are a New Zealand professional rugby union team based in Christchurch, New Zealand. The union was originally established in 1879, with the National Provincial Championship established in 1976. They now play in the reformed National Provincial Championship competition. They play their home games at One New Zealand Stadium in Christchurch in the Canterbury region. The team is affiliated with the Crusaders Super Rugby franchise. Their home playing colours are black and red.

== Current squad ==
The Canterbury squad for the 2026 Hilux NPC season is:

2026 Canterbury squad
**Props**: (New Zealand) **Jermaine Ainsley** (Note: Ainsley's international caps have been for Australia, but he switched allegiance to New Zealand in 2022; so far he has only represented the Māori All Blacks.); (New Zealand) Finlay Brewis; (New Zealand) Gus Brown; (New Zealand) Seb Calder; (New Zealand) Lachie Gunson ^{ST} (Note: Gunson wasn’t named in the original Canterbury squad, but was announced in the side for Round 9.); (New Zealand) Tonga Helu ^{ST} (Note: Helu wasn't named in the original Canterbury squad, but was announced as a late inclusion in the side for Round 6.); (New Zealand) Daniel Lienert-Brown; (New Zealand) **Fletcher Newell**; (New Zealand) Lewis Ponini; (New Zealand) **Tamaiti Williams**; **Hookers**: (New Zealand) **George Bell**; (New Zealand) Josh Findlay ^{ST} (Note: Findlay wasn’t named in the original Canterbury squad, but was announced in the side for Round 9.); (New Zealand) Nick Hyde; (New Zealand) Manumaua Letiu; (New Zealand) **Brodie McAlister** **(c)**; (New Zealand) **Codie Taylor**; **Locks**: (New Zealand) Tahlor Cahill; (New Zealand) Hamish Dalzell ^{ST} (Note: Dalzell wasn’t named in the original Canterbury squad, but was announced in the side for Round 7.); (New Zealand) **Sam Darry**; (New Zealand) Max Fale ^{ST} (Note: Fale wasn’t named in the original Canterbury squad, but was announced in the side for Round 6.); (New Zealand) **Jamie Hannah**; (New Zealand) Liam Jack; (New Zealand) Xavier Treacy	**Loose forwards**: (New Zealand) Phoenix Abbott ^{ST} (Note: Abbott wasn't named in the original Canterbury squad, but was announced in the side for Round 3.); (New Zealand) Torian Barnes; (New Zealand) Dominic Gardiner; (New Zealand) **Cullen Grace**; (New Zealand) Corey Kellow; (New Zealand) Finn McLeod; **Halfbacks (scrum-halves)**: (New Zealand) Tyson Belworthy; (New Zealand) Ollie Burra; (New Zealand) Louie Chapman; **First five-eighths (fly-halves)**: (New Zealand) Andrew Knewstubb; (Japan) Shun Miyake ^{ST} (Note: Miyake wasn't named in the original Canterbury squad, but was named as a late inclusion in the side for Round 3.); (New Zealand) **Richie Mo'unga**; (New Zealand) Macklan Robertson ^{ST} (Note: Robertson wasn’t named in the original Canterbury squad, but was announced in the side for Round 10.); (New Zealand) James White	**Midfielders (centres)**: (New Zealand) Toby Bell; (New Zealand) James Cameron; (Tonga) Tevita Latu (Note: Latu was named in the original Canterbury squad, but joined Auckland on a short-term loan ahead of Round 5. He returned to Canterbury for round 8.); (New Zealand) **Dallas McLeod**; (New Zealand) Jone Rova; **Outside backs**: (New Zealand) **Chay Fihaki**; (New Zealand) Isaac Hutchinson; (New Zealand) Kurtis MacDonald; (Fiji) **Manasa Mataele**; (Wales) **Johnny McNicholl**; (New Zealand) Ngane Punivai
**(c)** denotes the team captain. **Bold** denotes internationally capped players.^{ST} denotes a short-term signing. Source:

== Honours ==
Canterbury have been overall Champions on 15 occasions. Their first title was in 1977 and their most recent title was in 2025. Their full list of honours include:

National Provincial Championship First Division

- Winners: 1977, 1983, 1997, 2001, 2004

Air New Zealand Cup

- Winners: 2008, 2009

ITM Cup

- Winners: 2010

ITM Cup Premiership Division

- Winners: 2011, 2012, 2013, 2015

Mitre 10 Cup Premiership Division

- Winners: 2016, 2017

Bunnings NPC

- Winners: 2025

== Current Super Rugby players ==
Players named in the 2025 Canterbury squad, who also earned contracts or were named in a squad for any side participating in the 2025 Super Rugby Pacific season.

Player	Team
George Bell	Crusaders
Finlay Brewis	Crusaders
Tahlor Cahill	Crusaders
Seb Calder	Crusaders
Tom Christie	Crusaders
Sam Darry	Blues
Braydon Ennor	Crusaders
Chay Fihaki	Crusaders
Zach Gallagher	Hurricanes
Dominic Gardiner	Crusaders
Cullen Grace	Crusaders
Jamie Hannah	Crusaders
Corey Kellow	Crusaders
Manumaua Letiu	Crusaders
Daniel Lienert-Brown	Highlanders
Manasa Mataele	Chiefs
Brodie McAlister	Chiefs
Dallas McLeod	Crusaders
Johnny McNicholl	Crusaders
Fletcher Newell	Crusaders
Lewis Ponini	Crusaders
Ngane Punivai	Hurricanes
Jone Rova	Hurricanes
Codie Taylor	Crusaders
Tamaiti Williams	Crusaders
