= James Cameron (rugby union) =

New Zealand rugby union player

- Born: 15 October 2005 (age 21) New Zealand
- Height: 188 cm (6 ft 2 in)
- Weight: 93 kg (205 lb; 14 st 9 lb)
- School: Westlake Boys High School

Rugby union career
- Position: Midfielder
- Current team: Blues, Canterbury
Senior career
Years	Team	Apps	(Points)
2025–	Canterbury	1	(0)
2026–	Blues		
- Correct as of 9 November 2025
International career
Years	Team	Apps	(Points)
2025	New Zealand U20	2	(0)
- Correct as of 9 November 2025

James Cameron (born 15 October 2005) is a New Zealand rugby union player, who plays for the Blues and Canterbury. His preferred position is midfield.

== Early career ==
Cameron attended Westlake Boys High School where he captained the first XV and won sportsman of the year in 2023. He represented New Zealand Schools in 2023, where he was vice-captain, before moving to the Canterbury region to join the Crusaders academy, where he represented the U20 side in 2025. His performances earned him selection for New Zealand U20 in 2025.

== Professional career ==
Cameron has represented Canterbury in the National Provincial Championship since 2025, being named in the squad for the 2025 Bunnings NPC. He was named in the Blues squad for the 2026 Super Rugby Pacific season.
