= Toby Bell =

New Zealand rugby union player

- Born: 14 December 2004 (age 21) New Zealand
- Height: 189 cm (6 ft 2 in)
- School: Kerikeri High School

Rugby union career
- Position: Midfielder
- Current team: Crusaders, Canterbury
Senior career
Years	Team	Apps	(Points)
2024–	Canterbury	3	(0)
2026–	Crusaders		
- Correct as of 9 November 2025

Toby Bell (born 14 December 2004) is a New Zealand rugby union player, who plays for the Crusaders and Canterbury. His preferred position is midfield.

== Early career ==
Bell is originally from the Auckland region of New Zealand and attended Kerikeri High School where he played rugby and earned selection for the Blues U18 development squad. He also earned selection for the New Zealand U18 Sevens side. After school he moved to the Canterbury region to become a member of the Crusaders academy, where he represented the Crusaders U20 side in 2024. He earned selection for the New Zealand U20 side in 2024, but did not make an appearance due to injury.

== Professional career ==
Bell has represented Canterbury in the National Provincial Championship since 2024, being named in the squad for the 2025 Bunnings NPC. He was named in the Crusaders squad for the 2026 Super Rugby Pacific season.
