= Nic Shearer =

New Zealand rugby union player

- Full name: Nicholas Shearer
- Born: 16 April 2003 (age 23) Christchurch, New Zealand
- Height: 1.73 m (5 ft 8 in)
- Weight: 86 kg (190 lb; 13 st 8 lb)
- School: Christ's College

Rugby union career
- Position: Halfback
- Current team: Southland, Highlanders
Senior career
Years	Team	Apps	(Points)
2024	Canterbury	8	(10)
2025–	Southland	10	(15)
2026–	Highlanders	0	(0)
- Correct as of 4 February 2026

Nicholas Shearer (born 16 April 2003) is a New Zealand professional rugby union player who plays as a halfback for Super Rugby club Highlanders.

== Early life ==
Shearer attended Christ's College where he played rugby for the first XV. After leaving school, he joined up with the Crusaders academy, representing their junior side in 2021, and their U20 side in 2022 & 2023. He represented New Zealand U19s in 2022, before being named in the New Zealand U20 squad in 2023.

== Club career ==
Shearer has represented Southland in the National Provincial Championship since 2025, being named in the squad for the 2025 Bunnings NPC. The previous year he had represented Canterbury in the competition, before moving south. He was named in the Highlanders wider training group for the 2026 Super Rugby Pacific season.
