= Gus Brown (rugby union) =

New Zealand rugby union player

- Born: 30 May 2004 (age 22) Napier, New Zealand
- Height: 190 cm (6 ft 3 in)
- School: Napier Boys' High School
- Notable relative(s): Greg Halford (uncle); Simon Halford (uncle)

Rugby union career
- Position: Prop
- Current team: Crusaders, Canterbury
Senior career
Years	Team	Apps	(Points)
2024–	Canterbury	13	(5)
2026–	Crusaders	1	(0)
- Correct as of 16 June 2026
International career
Years	Team	Apps	(Points)
2024	New Zealand U20	1	(0)
- Correct as of 16 November 2025

Gus Brown (born 30 May 2004) is a New Zealand rugby union player, who currently plays as a prop for the Crusaders in Super Rugby and for Canterbury in New Zealand's domestic National Provincial Championship competition.

== Personal life and early career ==
Brown hails from Napier in the Hawke's Bay region on the east coast of New Zealand's North Island. He is the son of former Hawke's Bay and Central Vikings midfield back Hugh Brown and the nephew of former Hawke's Bay and Canterbury prop and current Wellington scrum coach Greg Halford and former Hawke's Bay, Manawatu, Central Vikings and North Harbour loose forward and prop Simon Halford.

Brown received his secondary school education at Napier Boys' High School. He played two years as a loose forward for the school's under-15 rugby team, shifted to lock when he joined the 1st XV team as a year 11 student in 2020 and moved to the frontrow the following year. He was part of the Napier Boys' 1st XV team that narrowly lost the National Top 4 Final 15–17 to Hamilton Boys' High School in 2022.

Brown represented Hawke's Bay at under-14 and under-16 level. In 2021 and 2022, he was among the under-18 talent from the Hurricanes region invited to attend the Hurricanes Development Camp.

After leaving school, Brown moved to the Canterbury region, where he plays premier club rugby for University of Canterbury RFC. In 2023, he represented Canterbury at under-19 level.

Both in 2023 and 2024, Brown was named in the Crusaders Under 20 squad for the Super Rugby Under 20 Tournament in Taupō. In 2024, the Crusaders Under 20 team won the tournament after beating the Chiefs U20s 31–17 in the Final. Brown scored one of the Crusaders' tries in that game.

== Senior career ==
Although Brown wasn't named in the Canterbury squad for the 2024 Bunnings NPC, he was later added to the squad as an injury replacement. He made his NPC debut for the province on 17 August 2024 against Tasman.

Earlier in 2024, Brown was part of the Crusaders squad that played a preseason game against Bristol Bears in Bristol, England. A year later, he again trained with, and played for, the Crusaders during preseason.

On 16 July 2025, Brown was named in the Canterbury squad for the first time. He scored his first try for the province on 25 October 2025 in the 2025 Bunnings NPC Final against Otago, which Canterbury won 36–28.

On 7 November 2025, Brown was named in the Crusaders wider training group for the 2026 Super Rugby Pacific season. He made his Super Rugby debut for the franchise – via the bench – on 6 June 2026, when the Crusaders beat the Blues in the Qualifying Finals.

== International career ==
On 7 October 2022, Brown was named in the New Zealand Secondary Schools squad for two matches – against the New Zealand Maori U18 team and Fiji Schools – to be played at a New Zealand Under 18 Quadrangular Tournament in Hamilton.

On 30 May 2024, Brown played for the New Zealand Universities team in a game against the Japan Under 20 team.

In 2023, Brown was named in the New Zealand U19 development camp. Although he wasn't initially named in the New Zealand Under 20 team in 2024, he was called into the squad during the 2024 World Rugby U20 Championship as an injury replacement and played in the semi-final against France.
