= Ben Lopas =

New Zealand rugby union player

- Full name: Benjamin Lopas
- Born: 28 December 2001 (age 24) New Zealand
- Height: 181 cm (5 ft 11 in)
- Weight: 111 kg (245 lb; 17 st 7 lb)
- School: Christchurch Boys' High School

Rugby union career
- Position: Prop
- Current team: Highlanders, Otago
Senior career
Years	Team	Apps	(Points)
2023–	Otago	24	(5)
2026–	Highlanders		
- Correct as of 16 November 2025

Ben Lopas (born 28 December 2001) is a New Zealand rugby union player, who plays for the Highlanders and Otago. His preferred position is prop.

== Early career ==
Lopas attended Christchurch Boys' High School where he played rugby for the first XV. His performances for the school earned him selection for the New Zealand Schools side in 2019. After leaving school, he joined up with the Crusaders academy, representing their U18 side in 2018. After missing out on selection for the Crusaders U20 squad, he instead represented the New Zealand Barbarians U21 side in 2022. He plays his club rugby for Green Island in Dunedin.

== Professional career ==
Lopas has represented Otago in the National Provincial Championship since 2023, being named in the squad for the 2025 Bunnings NPC. He was named in the Highlanders wider training group for the 2026 Super Rugby Pacific season.
