= Mosese Bason =

New Zealand rugby union player

- Born: 5 September 2005 (age 21) Tofoa, Tonga
- Height: 189 cm (6 ft 2 in)
- Weight: 103 kg (227 lb; 16 st 3 lb)
- School: Feilding High School
- Notable relative: Vernon Bason (brother)

Rugby union career
- Position: Flanker / Number 8
- Current team: Hurricanes, Manawatu
Senior career
| Years | Team | Apps | (Points) |
| 2024– | Manawatu | 14 | (15) |
| 2026– | Hurricanes | | |
- Correct as of 19 November 2025
International career
| Years | Team | Apps | (Points) |
| 2024–2025 | New Zealand U20 | 12 | (30) |
- Correct as of 19 November 2025

Mosese Bason (born 5 September 2005) is a New Zealand rugby union player, who plays for the Hurricanes and Manawatu. His preferred position is flanker or number 8.

== Early career ==
Bason was born in Tofoa, Tonga but moved to New Zealand in 2007 where his parents are egg farmers. He attended Feilding High School where he played rugby, where he earned selection for New Zealand Schools in 2023. After leaving school, he joined up with the Hurricanes academy, representing their U20 side in 2024 and 2025. His performances earned him selection for the New Zealand U20 squad in 2024 and 2025. He is one of three siblings to play rugby, with his sister Taufa representing New Zealand women and brother Vernon representing both the Hurricanes & Manawatu.

== Professional career ==
Bason has represented Manawatu in the National Provincial Championship since 2024, being named in the squad for the 2025 Bunnings NPC. He was named in the Hurricanes wider training group for the 2026 Super Rugby Pacific season.
