= Taine Roiri =

Australian rugby union player

- Born: 10 March 2002 (age 24) Brisbane, Australia
- Height: 199 cm (6 ft 6 in)
- Weight: 121 kg (267 lb; 19 st 1 lb)
- School: John Paul College

Rugby union career
- Position: Lock
- Current team: Hurricanes, Manawatu
Senior career
Years	Team	Apps	(Points)
2022–2024	Reds	0	(0)
2025–	Manawatu	10	(15)
2026–	Hurricanes		
- Correct as of 18 November 2025

Taine Roiri (born 10 March 2002) is an Australian rugby union player, who plays for the Hurricanes and Manawatu. His preferred position is lock.

== Early career ==
Roiri was born in Brisbane, Australia, to New Zealand parents and attended John Paul College in the city, earning selection for the Australian Schools Barbarians side in 2019. After leaving school, he joined up with the Queensland Reds academy. While in Queensland, he played his club rugby for Sunnybank Dragons.

== Professional career ==
Roiri was a member of the Reds Super Rugby squad in 2024 but didn't make a Super Rugby appearance for the side. He though did make his Queensland debut for the side in 2022 against the Saitama Wild Knights, while also making an appearance in 2024 against Tonga. He has represented Manawatu in the National Provincial Championship since 2025, being named in the squad for the 2025 Bunnings NPC. He was named in the Hurricanes wider training group for the 2026 Super Rugby Pacific season.
