= Jae Broomfield =

New Zealand rugby union player

- Born: 4 March 2003 (age 23) New Zealand
- Height: 184 cm (6 ft 0 in)
- Weight: 96 kg (212 lb; 15 st 2 lb)
- School: St Paul's Collegiate School

Rugby union career
- Position: Wing
- Current team: Crusaders, Otago
Senior career
Years	Team	Apps	(Points)
2025–	Otago	13	(15)
2026–	Crusaders		
- Correct as of 16 November 2025

Jae Broomfield (born 4 March 2003) is a New Zealand rugby union player, who plays for the Crusaders and Otago. His preferred position is wing.

== Early career ==
Broomfield attended St Paul's Collegiate School where he played rugby for the first XV. After leaving school, he originally joined up with the Chiefs academy, representing their U18 side in 2021, before moving to the Crusaders academy who he represented at U20 level in 2023. He plays his club rugby for the University of Canterbury, and has previously been vice-captain of the New Zealand Universities side.

== Professional career ==
Broomfield has represented Otago in the National Provincial Championship since 2025, being named as a replacement player in the squad for the 2025 Bunnings NPC. He was named in the Crusaders wider training group for the 2026 Super Rugby Pacific season.
