= Terrell Peita =

New Zealand rugby union player

- Born: 23 April 2000 (age 26) New Zealand
- Height: 189 cm (6 ft 2 in)
- Weight: 106 kg (234 lb; 16 st 10 lb)
- School: Mount Albert Grammar School

Rugby union career
- Position: Flanker / Number 8
- Current team: Blues, Northland
Senior career
Years	Team	Apps	(Points)
2020–2022	Auckland	7	(25)
2022	New England Free Jacks	10	(5)
2023	Manawatu	8	(5)
2024–	Northland	17	(25)
2026–	Blues		
- Correct as of 9 November 2025

Terrell Peita (born 23 April 2000) is a New Zealand rugby union player, who plays for the Blues and Northland. His preferred position is flanker or number 8.

== Early career ==
Peita attended Mount Albert Grammar School where he captained the first XV. His performances for the school earned him selection for the New Zealand U18 Maori side, which he again captained. He earned selection for the New Zealand U20 development squad in 2020.

== Professional career ==
Peita has represented Northland in the National Provincial Championship since 2024, being named in the squad for the 2025 Bunnings NPC. He had previously represented Auckland in the competition between 2020 and 2022, and Manawatu in 2023 as part of a loan spell from Auckland. Peita also had a spell overseas, representing New England Free Jacks in the 2022 Major League Rugby season. He was named in the Blues squad for the 2026 Super Rugby Pacific season.
