= James White (rugby union) =

New Zealand rugby union player

- Born: 16 September 2003 (age 23) New Zealand
- Height: 180 cm (5 ft 11 in)
- Weight: 95 kg (209 lb; 14 st 13 lb)
- School: Christchurch Boys' High School

Rugby union career
- Position: First five-eighth
- Current team: Crusaders, Canterbury
Senior career
Years	Team	Apps	(Points)
2024–	Canterbury	14	(85)
2026–	Crusaders		
- Correct as of 9 November 2025

James White (born 16 September 2003) is a New Zealand rugby union player, who plays for the Crusaders and Canterbury. His preferred position is first five-eighth.

== Early career ==
White attended Christchurch Boys' High School where he played for their first XV. After school he joined up with the Crusaders academy, first representing their junior side before being named in the Crusaders U20 squad in both 2022 and 2023. He plays his club rugby for the University of Canterbury.

== Professional career ==
White has represented Canterbury in the National Provincial Championship since 2024, being named in the squad for the 2025 Bunnings NPC. He was named in the Crusaders squad for the 2026 Super Rugby Pacific season.
