= Cohen Brady-Leathem =

New Zealand rugby union player

- Born: 7 May 2003 (age 23) New Zealand
- Height: 174 cm (5 ft 9 in)
- Weight: 75 kg (165 lb; 11 st 11 lb)
- School: Pukekohe High School

Rugby union career
- Position: Halfback
- Current team: Chiefs, Counties Manukau
Senior career
| Years | Team | Apps | (Points) |
| 2023– | Counties Manukau | 15 | (15) |
| 2026– | Chiefs | | |
- Correct as of 12 November 2025

Cohen Brady-Leathem (born 7 May 2003) is a New Zealand rugby union player, who plays for the Chiefs and Counties Manukau. His preferred position is halfback.

== Early career ==
Brady-Leathem attended Pukekohe High School where he played rugby for the first XV, earning selection for the Chiefs U18 squad in 2021. After leaving school he joined up with the Chiefs academy, representing their U20 side in 2023. He plays his club rugby for Patumahoe in the Counties Manukau region, and has also featured in rugby sevens tournaments.

== Professional career ==
Brady-Leathem has represented Counties Manukau in the National Provincial Championship since 2023, being named in the squad for the 2025 Bunnings NPC. He was named in the Chiefs wider training group for the 2026 Super Rugby Pacific season.
