= Lucas Casey =

New Zealand rugby union player

- Born: 30 April 2003 (age 23) Kerikeri, New Zealand
- Height: 183 cm (6 ft 0 in)
- School: Kerikeri High School

Rugby union career
- Position: Flanker
- Current team: Highlanders, Otago
Senior career
Years	Team	Apps	(Points)
2024–	Otago	17	(50)
2026–	Highlanders	10	(10)
- Correct as of 16 May 2026

Lucas Casey (born 30 April 2003) is a New Zealand rugby union player, who plays for the Highlanders and Otago. His preferred position is flanker.

== Early career ==
Casey was born in Kerikeri and attended Kerikeri High School where he played rugby for the first XV. After leaving school, he firstly joined up with the Blues academy, representing their U18 side in 2021, before joining up with the Highlanders academy, representing their U20 side in 2023. The following year, he represented the New Zealand Barbarians U21 side in the 2024 tournament. He plays his club rugby for Kaikorai in Dunedin.

== Professional career ==
Casey has represented Otago in the National Provincial Championship since 2024, being named in the squad for the 2025 Bunnings NPC. He was named in the Highlanders wider training group for the 2026 Super Rugby Pacific season.

== Personal life ==
Casey is the nephew of NZ radio legend Bryce Casey. Although it hasn't been confirmed by Lucas himself, Bryce continues to bring it up on his morning breakfast show
