= Torian Barnes =

New Zealand rugby union player

- Born: 14 October 2003 (age 23) New Zealand
- Height: 195 cm (6 ft 5 in)
- School: St Andrew's College, Christchurch

Rugby union career
- Position: Flanker / Number 8
- Current team: Blues, Canterbury
Senior career
Years	Team	Apps	(Points)
2024–	Canterbury	15	(5)
2026–	Blues	14	(15)
- Correct as of 10 November 2025

Torian Barnes (born 14 October 2003) is a New Zealand rugby union player, who plays for the Blues and Canterbury. His preferred position is flanker or number 8.

== Early career ==
Barnes attended St Andrew's College, Christchurch where he played for the first XV, and earned selection for New Zealand Schools in 2020. Having left school, he joined up with the Crusaders academy, representing their development side in 2024. He plays his club rugby for Sydenham in the Canterbury region.

== Professional career ==
Barnes has represented Canterbury in the National Provincial Championship since 2024, being named in the squad for the 2025 Bunnings NPC. He was named in the Blues wider training group for the 2026 Super Rugby Pacific season.
