= Jack Lee (rugby union) =

New Zealand rugby union player

- Born: 12 July 2004 (age 22) New Zealand
- Height: 197 cm (6 ft 6 in)
- Weight: 110 kg (243 lb; 17 st 5 lb)
- School: Westlake Boys High School

Rugby union career
- Position: Lock
- Current team: Blues, North Harbour
Senior career
Years	Team	Apps	(Points)
2025–	North Harbour	10	(0)
2026–	Blues		
- Correct as of 10 November 2025

Jack Lee (born 12 July 2004) is a New Zealand rugby union player, who plays for the Blues and North Harbour. His preferred position is lock.

== Early career ==
Lee attended Westlake Boys High School where he played for the first XV, and earned selection for the Blues U18 side. After leaving school he joined up with the Blues academy, and was named in the Blues U20 squad in 2023 and 2024. He plays his club rugby for Takapuna in the North Harbour region.

== Professional career ==
Fono has represented North Harbour in the National Provincial Championship since 2025, being named in the squad for the 2025 Bunnings NPC. He was named in the Blues wider training group for the 2026 Super Rugby Pacific season.
