= Vernon Bason =

New Zealand rugby union player (born 2004)

- Born: 10 October 2004 (age 22) Tonga
- Height: 180 cm (5 ft 11 in)
- Weight: 106 kg (234 lb; 16 st 10 lb)
- School: Feilding High School
- Notable relative: Mosese Bason (brother)

Rugby union career
- Position: Hooker
- Current team: Hurricanes, Manawatu
Senior career
Years	Team	Apps	(Points)
2023–	Manawatu	24	(15)
2026–	Hurricanes		
- Correct as of 9 November 2025
International career
Years	Team	Apps	(Points)
2023–2024	New Zealand U20	9	(10)
- Correct as of 9 November 2025

Vernon Bason (born 10 October 2004) is a New Zealand rugby union player, who plays for the Hurricanes and Manawatu. His preferred position is hooker.

== Early career ==
Bason was born in Tonga but moved to New Zealand with his family who are egg farmers at e.g. He attended Feilding High School where he played rugby and was named in the New Zealand Schools side in 2021. After leaving school he joined the Hurricanes academy system, representing the side in both 2023 and 2024. His performances earned him selection for the New Zealand U20 side in both 2023 and 2024. He is one of three siblings to play rugby, with his sister Taufa representing New Zealand women and brother Mosese representing Manawatu.

== Professional career ==
Bason has represented Manawatu in the National Provincial Championship since 2023, being named in the squad for the 2025 Bunnings NPC. He was named in the Hurricanes squad for the 2026 Super Rugby Pacific season.
