= James Parsons (rugby union) =

New Zealand rugby union player

- Full name: James William Parsons
- Born: 27 November 1986 (age 39) Palmerston North, New Zealand
- Height: 185 cm (6 ft 1 in)
- Weight: 106 kg (234 lb; 16 st 10 lb)
- School: King's College
- Notable relative: Tom Parsons (cousin)

Rugby union career
- Position: Hooker
- Current team: North Harbour, Blues
Senior career
Years	Team	Apps	(Points)
2007–2021	North Harbour	106	(132)
2012–2021	Blues	115	(40)
- Correct as of 15 March 2021
International career
Years	Team	Apps	(Points)
2014–2016	New Zealand	2	(0)
- Correct as of 12 April 2019

James William Parsons (born 27 November 1986) is a New Zealand retired rugby union player who played as a hooker for the Blues in Super Rugby and North Harbour in the ITM Cup. He has also played two matches for the All Blacks. He is one of just 3 players that have ever become a Blues centurion and Player of the Year

== Early life ==
He was born in Palmerston North and educated at King's College in Auckland, completing his education in 2004.

== Career ==
He was first selected for North Harbour in 2007 and went on to become a centurion for the province. In 2012 he debuted for the Blues in Super Rugby, his first game being against the Highlanders.

After being called up to the All Blacks squad as injury cover, he made his international debut against Scotland on 15 November 2014. Parsons is one of eight All Blacks to have come from the Takapuna Rugby Club.

In 2015, he gave up his starting spot to the retiring Keven Mealamu in his 50th appearance for the Blues against Highlanders at Eden Park. Parsons would take over as the captain of the Blues the following year.

Parsons was recalled to the New Zealand team in 2016 due to Nathan Harris's injury, where he played as a substitute against Australia at Westpac Stadium during the Bledisloe Series. However, his season was cut short when he suffered an injury during a training session, preventing him from playing further that year. Additionally, he was honored as the Blues Player of the Year in the same season.

In 2019, Parsons re-signed with the Blues until 2021.

In January 2021, Parsons announced his retirement from rugby, on medical advice.
