= Keran van Staden =

New Zealand rugby union player

- Born: 16 April 2003 (age 23) Jakarta Indonesia
- Height: 189 cm (6 ft 2 in)
- Weight: 125 kg (276 lb; 19 st 10 lb)
- School: Hamilton Boys' High School

Rugby union career
- Position: Prop
- Current team: Kubota Spears
Senior career
Years	Team	Apps	(Points)
2023–2025	Counties Manukau	23	(15)
2026	Chiefs	1	(0)
2026–	Kubota Spears		
- Correct as of 11 November 2025

Keran van Staden (born 16 April 2003) is a New Zealand rugby union player, who plays for the Chiefs and Counties Manukau. His preferred position is prop.

== Early career ==
Van Staden born in Jakarta Indonesia from South African parents. Moved to South Africa in 2004, then to New Zealand in 2016 and attended Hamilton Boys' High School where he played rugby for the first XV, earning selection for the Chiefs U18 development camp. After leaving school he joined up with the Counties Manukau academy, winning the Kieran Read scholarship in 2022, and earned selection to tour South Africa with New Zealand U19s in 2022. He plays his club rugby for Pukekohe in the Counties Manukau region, and represented the Chiefs U20 side in 2023.

== Professional career ==
Van Staden has represented Counties Manukau in the National Provincial Championship since 2023, being named in the squad for the 2025 Bunnings NPC. He was named in the Chiefs wider training group for the 2026 Super Rugby Pacific season.
