= Jed Melvin =

New Zealand rugby union player

- Born: 13 December 2000 (age 25) Auckland, New Zealand
- Height: 183 cm (6 ft 0 in)
- Weight: 107 kg (236 lb; 16 st 12 lb)
- School: Orewa College

Rugby union career
- Position: Flanker / Number 8
- Current team: Blues / North Harbour
Senior career
Years	Team	Apps	(Points)
2022–	North Harbour	47	(55)
2024–2025	New England Free Jacks	24	(67)
2026–	Blues	1	(0)
- Correct as of 1 November 2026

Jed Melvin (born 13 December 2000) is an New Zealand rugby union player, who plays for the Blues. His preferred position is flanker or Number 8.

== Early career ==
Melvin was born in Auckland, and attended Orewa College where he captained the first XV and was headboy. His performances at school earned him selection for the Blues U18 side, but he did not progress further with the Blues academy, instead representing the East Coast Bays in club rugby after school.

== Professional career ==
Melvin was first named in the North Harbour squad for the 2022 Bunnings NPC. Strong performances over the next two seasons saw him sign for the New England Free Jacks for the 2024 Major League Rugby season, in his first start for the club on May 16, vs. Utah he scored a career high three tries. Melvin also earned the most valuable player award in the 2024 Major League Rugby final, before re-signing ahead of the 2025 season, helping the Free Jacks win a second straight championship scoring eight tries during the season. Having been North Harbour's leading try scorer in the 2025 Bunnings NPC, Melvin was announced as signing for the Blues wider training group ahead of the 2026 Super Rugby Pacific season. Ahead of Round 7 of the season, Melvin was called into the full Blues squad, debuting for the side against the Drua. After captaining North Harbour in the 2026 Hilux NPC, Melvin was announced in the full Blues squad for the 2027 Super Rugby Pacific season.

== Honors ==
New England Free Jacks

- Major League Rugby Championship (2024, 2025)
- 2024 Major League Rugby championship game MVP
