= Rui Farrant =

New Zealand rugby union player

- Born: 30 October 2004 (age 22) Te Awamutu, New Zealand
- Height: 173 cm (5 ft 8 in)
- School: St Peter's School, Cambridge

Rugby union career
- Position: Halfback
- Current team: Chiefs / Waikato
Senior career
Years	Team	Apps	(Points)
2025–	Waikato	13	(20)
2027–	Chiefs	0	(0)
- Correct as of 10 November 2026

Rui Farrant (born 30 October 2004) is a New Zealand rugby union player, who plays for the Chiefs. His preferred position is halfback.

== Early career ==
Farrant was born in Te Awamutu and attended St Peter's School, Cambridge. After leaving school, he played for the Waikato academy, being named in their U19 side in 2024. He was also a member of the Chiefs academy, representing their U20 side in 2024, while also representing their developmental sevens side. He plays his club rugby for Hautapu in the Waikato region.

== Professional career ==
Farrant has represented Waikato in the National Provincial Championship since 2025, being named in their squad for the 2026 Hilux NPC competition. In October 2026, he was named in the Chiefs wider training group for the 2027 Super Rugby Pacific season.
