= Rico Simpson =

New Zealand rugby union player

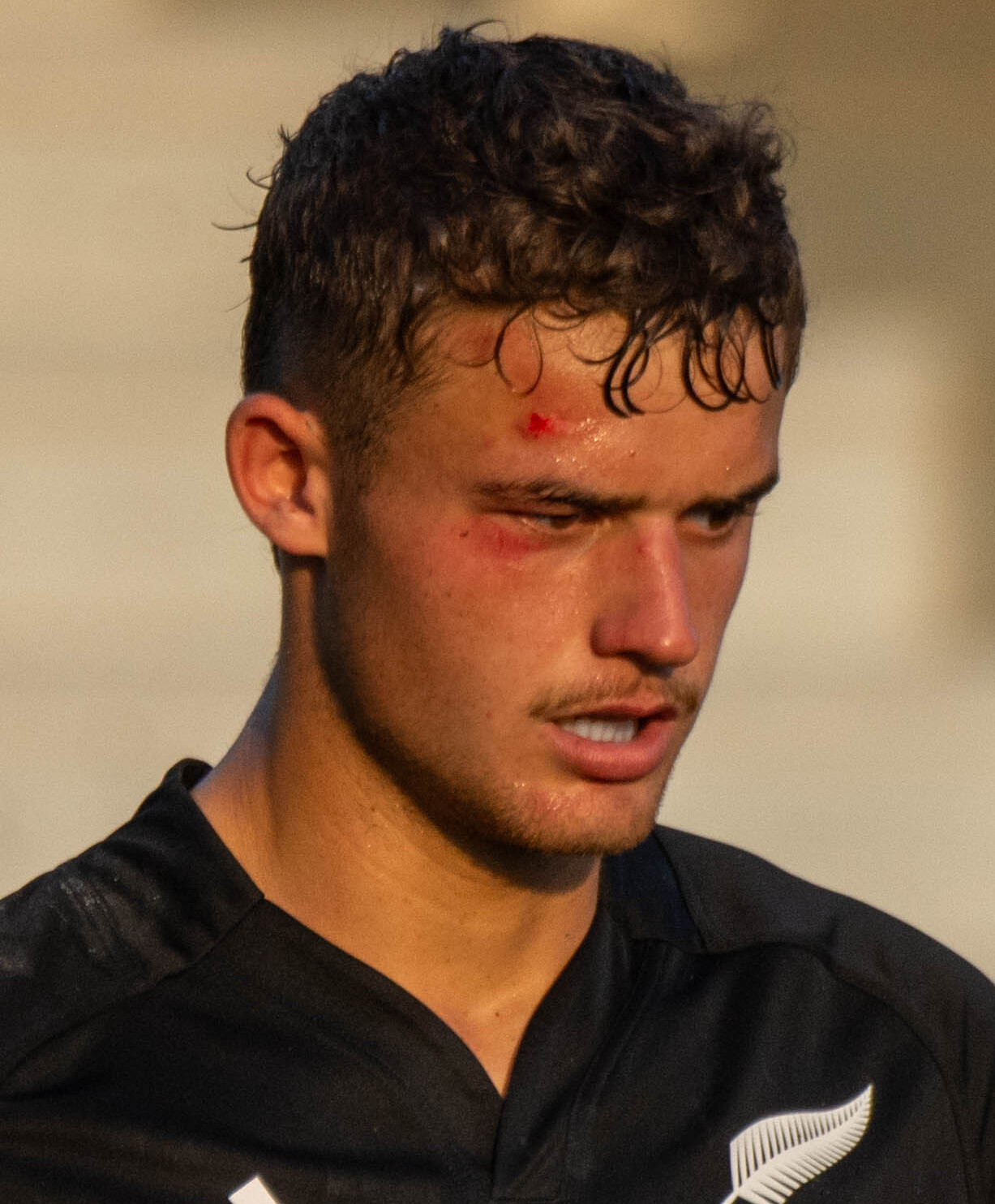
- Simpson at the 2025 World Rugby U20 Championship in Italy
- Born: 24 December 2005 (age 20) New Zealand
- Height: 195 cm (6 ft 5 in)
- Weight: 93 kg (205 lb; 14 st 9 lb)
- School: Sacred Heart College, Auckland

Rugby union career
- Position: First five-eighth
- Current team: Blues, Auckland
Senior career
Years	Team	Apps	(Points)
2024–	Auckland	17	(45)
2026–	Blues		
- Correct as of 9 November 2025
International career
Years	Team	Apps	(Points)
2024–2025	New Zealand U20	16	(78)
- Correct as of 9 November 2025

Rico Simpson (born 24 December 2005) is a New Zealand rugby union player, who plays for the Blues and Auckland. His preferred position is first five-eighth.

== Early career ==
Simpson attended St Mary's Catholic School, Papakura before attending Sacred Heart College, Auckland. His performances for the school earned him selection for the New Zealand Schools side in 2022, before joining the Blues academy and representing their U20 side. Following this he represented the New Zealand U20s in both 2024 and 2025.

== Professional career ==
Simpson has represented Auckland in the National Provincial Championship since 2024, being named in the squad for the 2025 Bunnings NPC. He was named in the Blues squad for the 2026 Super Rugby Pacific season.
