= Xavier Tito-Harris =

New Zealand rugby union player (born 2005)

- Born: 5 January 2005 (age 21) Auckland, New Zealand
- Height: 1.89 m (6 ft 2 in)
- Weight: 95 kg (209 lb; 14 st 13 lb)
- School: Kelston Boys' High School

Rugby union career
- Position(s): Full back, Wing
- Current team: Highlanders
Senior career
| Years | Team | Apps | (Points) |
| 2023– | Auckland | 17 | (55) |
Super Rugby
| Years | Team | Apps | (Points) |
| 2026– | Highlanders | 1 | (5) |
National sevens team
| Years | Team | | Comps |
| 2023– | New Zealand | | |

Xavier Tito-Harris (born 5 January 2005) is a New Zealand professional rugby union player who plays as a full back and wing. He plays for Super Rugby club Highlanders and previously played for Auckland and the New Zealand national sevens team.

== Early life ==
He attended Kelston Boys' High School. He played rugby league as well as featuring at the World Schools Sevens tournament.

== Club career ==
He scored a hat trick on debut for Auckland in the National Provincial Championship against Rugby Southland. During the 2022-2023 season he played at full back and as a winger.

Ahead of the 2026 season, he left the New Zealand Rugby Sevens programme and signed for Super Rugby side Highlanders.

== International career ==
In January 2023, he signed a two-year contract with the New Zealand national rugby sevens team. He made his international debut at the Hong Kong Sevens in March 2023. He scored two tries at the London Sevens Series tournament in May 2023 at Twickenham after being called-up as a late injury replacement. He featured as New Zealand won the Hong Kong Sevens in April 2024.

== Honours ==
New Zealand U20

- World Rugby Under 20 Championship
  - (bronze) Champion (1): 2024
