= Daniel Lienert-Brown =

NZ rugby union player (born 1993)

- Born: 9 February 1993 (age 33) Christchurch, New Zealand
- Height: 184 cm (6 ft 0 in)
- Weight: 109 kg (17 st 2 lb; 240 lb)
- School: Christchurch Boys' High School
- Notable relative: Anton Lienert-Brown (brother)

Rugby union career
- Position: Prop
- Current team: Canterbury, Highlanders
Senior career
Years	Team	Apps	(Points)
2014	Crusaders	2	(0)
2014−	Canterbury	99	(15)
2015−	Highlanders	101	(25)
- Correct as of 5 June 2022
International career
Years	Team	Apps	(Points)
2013	New Zealand U20	2	(0)
2020	Moana Pasifika	1	(0)
- Correct as of 5 June 2022

Daniel Lienert-Brown (born 9 February 1993) is a New Zealand rugby union player who currently plays as a loosehead prop for Canterbury in New Zealand's domestic Mitre 10 Cup and the Highlanders in the international Super Rugby competition.

== Early career ==
Born and raised in Christchurch along with younger brother Anton who would go on to become an All Black, Daniel attended Christchurch Boys' High School and played for the school's first XV rugby team. His next step was to become a member of the Crusaders Knights development team in 2014 while at the same time turning out for High School Old Boys in Canterbury's local club rugby competition.

== Senior career ==
His first involvement with Canterbury's senior side came in 2014 when he played 4 times, twice from the start and twice as a replacement as the men from Christchurch reached the ITM Cup Premiership semi-finals before losing out to local rivals, Tasman. 2015 saw Canterbury back to winning ways, lifting the ITM Cup title after a narrow victory over Auckland. Despite facing a fierce battle for game time from fellow looseheads; Joe Moody and Alex Hodgman, Lienert-Brown asserted himself well and started 6 times during the season and also managed to net his first provincial try. With Moody spending the entire 2016 Mitre 10 Cup campaign with the All Blacks, Lienert-Brown saw his opportunities for playing time increase and he played in 10 of Canterbury's 12 games throughout a year which culminated in them winning the Mitre 10 Cup Premiership once more, this time with a comprehensive 43–27 win over Tasman which made it 8 provincial titles in 9 years for the red and blacks.

== Super Rugby ==
Despite only being aged 21 and having no provincial experience, a front-row injury crisis for Christchurch-based Super Rugby franchise, the Crusaders midway through the 2014 season saw him receive an unexpected call up. He was an unused substitute for the Crusaders home match against the Hurricanes on 28 April, but made his Super Rugby debut the following week as his side defeated the Lions 28–7 in Johannesburg. He made 2 substitute appearances in total throughout the year, but was unable to secure a contract with any of New Zealand's 5 Super Rugby franchises for 2015, however, injuries once more provided him an opportunity and this time it was one he would take. He was called into the Dunedin-based Highlanders squad early in the 2015 season and ended up playing 12 times in a fairytale season for them finished with them being crowned Super Rugby champions for the first time after a 21–14 victory away to the Hurricanes in the final. A full squad member for 2016, he featured in 14 games and scored 2 tries as the men from Dunedin were eliminated by the Lions at the semi-final stage.

Tony Brown replaced the Japan bound Jamie Joseph as the Highlanders head coach ahead of the 2017 Super Rugby season and he retained Lienert-Brown in the squad for his first campaign in charge.

== International ==
Lienert-Brown was a member of the New Zealand Under 20 team which finished 4th in the 2013 IRB Junior World Championship in France. Not originally named in the squad, he was called up as an injury replacement for future Canterbury teammate, Alex Hodgman and went on to make 2 substitute appearances.

== Career Honours ==
Highlanders

- Super Rugby - 2015

Canterbury

- National Provincial Championship - 2015, 2016

== Super Rugby Statistics ==
As of 23 December 2016

Season	Team	Games	Starts	Sub	Mins	Tries	Cons	Pens	Drops	Points	Yel	Red
2014	Crusaders	2	0	2	11	0	0	0	0	0	0	0
2015	Highlanders	12	1	11	252	0	0	0	0	0	0	0
2016	Highlanders	14	10	4	764	2	0	0	0	10	0	0
Total		28	11	17	1027	2	0	0	0	10	0	0
