= Arese Poliko =

New Zealand rugby union player

- Born: 23 January 2001 (age 25) Randwick, Australia
- Height: 190 cm (6 ft 3 in)
- Weight: 115 kg (254 lb; 18 st 2 lb)
- School: Southland Boys' High School

Rugby union career
- Position: Flanker / Number 8
- Current team: Hurricanes, Taranaki
Senior career
Years	Team	Apps	(Points)
2020–2022	Southland	7	(0)
2023–	Taranaki	11	(0)
2025–	Hurricanes		
- Correct as of 10 December 2024

Arese Poliko (born 23 January 2001) is an Australian-born New Zealand rugby union player, who plays for the Hurricanes and Taranaki. His preferred position is flanker or number 8.

== Early career ==
Poliko was born in Australia to Samoan parents and only took up rugby after re-locating to Samoa aged 12. He moved to New Zealand to attend Menzies College before attending Southland Boys' High School. He previously represented Highlanders U18 and later the Highlanders U20 side.

== Professional career ==
Poliko has represented Taranaki in the National Provincial Championship since 2023, being named in their full squad for the 2024 Bunnings NPC. He previously represented Southland in the competition between 2020 and 2022. He was named in the Hurricanes squad for the 2025 Super Rugby Pacific season in November 2024.
