= Dominic Gardiner =

New Zealand rugby union player

- Born: 12 July 2001 (age 25)
- Height: 191 cm (6 ft 3 in)
- Weight: 108 kg (238 lb; 17 st 0 lb)
- School: St. Bede's College

Rugby union career
- Position: Flanker
- Current team: Canterbury, Crusaders
Senior career
Years	Team	Apps	(Points)
2021–	Canterbury	14	(10)
2022–	Crusaders	5	(0)
- Correct as of 5 November 2022
International career
Years	Team	Apps	(Points)
2022	All Blacks XV	1	(0)
- Correct as of 5 November 2022

Dominic Gardiner is a New Zealand rugby union player who plays for the Crusaders in Super Rugby. His playing position is flanker. He was named in the Crusaders squad for the 2022 Super Rugby Pacific season. He was also a member of the Canterbury 2021 Bunnings NPC squad.
