= Dylan Pledger =

New Zealand rugby union player

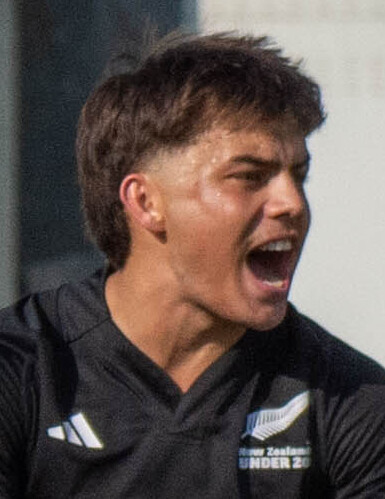
- Pledger in 2025
- Born: 5 June 2005 (age 21) New Zealand
- Height: 171 cm (5 ft 7 in)
- Weight: 74 kg (163 lb; 11 st 9 lb)
- School: King's High School, Dunedin

Rugby union career
- Position: Halfback
- Current team: Highlanders, Otago
Senior career
Years	Team	Apps	(Points)
2024–	Otago	13	(40)
2026–	Highlanders		
- Correct as of 9 November 2025
International career
Years	Team	Apps	(Points)
2024–2025	New Zealand U20	13	(45)
- Correct as of 9 November 2025

Dylan Pledger (born 5 June 2005) is a New Zealand rugby union player, who plays for the Highlanders and Otago. His preferred position is halfback.

He competed for New Zealand Touch Blacks in the 2023 B18 Youth Trans Tasman final against Australia.

== Early career ==
Pledger grew up in Dunedin and attended King's High School, Dunedin, where he played rugby, earning selection for the New Zealand Schools side in 2022. After leaving school he joined the Highlanders academy system representing the Highlanders U20 side in 2025. His performances earned him selection for the New Zealand U20 side in 2024 and 2025.

== Professional career ==
Pledger has represented Otago in the National Provincial Championship since 2024, being named in the squad for the 2025 Bunnings NPC. He was named in the Highlanders squad for the 2026 Super Rugby Pacific season.
