= Simon Halford =

New Zealand rugby union player (born 1971)

- Full name: Simon James Halford
- Born: 26 June 1971 (age 55) Palmerston North, New Zealand
- Height: 6 ft 2 in (188 cm)
- Weight: 254 lb (115 kg)

Rugby union career
- Position: Prop / Loose forward
Senior career
Years	Team	Apps	(Points)
1999–03	London Irish	66	(0)
2003	Leeds Tykes	6	(0)
Provincial / State sides
Years	Team	Apps	(Points)
1990–92	Hawke's Bay	21	(8)
1993–98	Manawatu	41	(20)
1997	Central Vikings	8	(0)
1999	North Harbour	9	(0)

Simon James Halford (born 26 June 1971) is a New Zealand former professional rugby union player.

Born in Palmerston North, Halford is the brother of former Hawke's Bay captain Greg Halford.

Halford started out at Hawke's Bay as a loose forward, before moving to the front row when he played with Manawatu, becoming a specialist tighthead prop. He captained Manawatu in 1998 and after a season with North Harbour the following year left for the United Kingdom. From 1999 to 2003, Halford played for London Irish and was a member of their side that won the 2001–02 Powergen Cup, coming on off the bench in the final. He got signed by the Leeds Tykes in 2003 as cover for Gavin Kerr, who was due to be absent during the World Cup.

An orchardist, Halford and his wife run Halford's Orchard outside Hastings in Hawke's Bay.
