= Tomasi Maka =

Australian rugby union player

- Full name: Tomasi Maka
- Born: 21 October 2002 (age 24) Australia
- Height: 183 cm (6 ft 0 in)
- Weight: 123 kg (271 lb; 19 st 5 lb)
- Notable relative: Finau Maka (Uncle)

Rugby union career
- Position: Hooker
Senior career
Years	Team	Apps	(Points)
2024–2025	Moana Pasifika	7	(0)
2025	Tasman	11	(45)
- Correct as of 11 October 2025
International career
Years	Team	Apps	(Points)
2022	Australia U20	3	(0)
- Correct as of 11 October 2025

Tomasi Maka (born 21 October 2002) is an Australian rugby union player, of Tongan heritage. His position is hooker.

== Early career ==
Maka is of Tongan heritage, but grew up in Australia. He played his club rugby for Gordon. He had previously been a member of the Waratahs academy, and represented the Junior Wallabies. Following the 2024 Super Rugby season, Maka represented North Shore in the North Harbour Rugby Championship. He was later named in the North Harbour development squad for the 2024 season.

== Professional career ==
Maka joined Moana Pasifika for the 2024 Super Rugby Pacific season. He made his debut in Round 3 of the season against the Rebels.
