= Chay Fihaki =

New Zealand rugby union player

- Full name: Lupeti Chay Fihaki
- Born: 3 January 2001 (age 25) Auckland, New Zealand
- Height: 192 cm (6 ft 4 in)
- Weight: 102 kg (225 lb; 16 st 1 lb)
- School: Sacred Heart College
- Notable relative(s): Noah Fihaki, Brother

Rugby union career
- Position: Centre / Wing / Fullback
- Current team: Canterbury / Crusaders
Senior career
Years	Team	Apps	(Points)
2020–	Canterbury	72	(184)
2021-	Crusaders	57	(132)
- Correct as of 17 October 2026
International career
Years	Team	Apps	(Points)
2019	New Zealand U20	1	(5)
2026–	New Zealand	1	(0)
- Correct as of 17 October 2026

Chay Fihaki (born 1 January 2001, in New Zealand) is a New Zealand rugby union player who plays for the Crusaders in Super Rugby Pacific and Canterbury in the Bunnings NPC. His primary playing position is fullback but can also cover centre and wing. Fihaki attended Sacred Heart College in Auckland, where he played in the 1st XV. He signed for the Canterbury squad in 2020. He made his Crusaders debut in the 2021 Super Rugby season.
