= Tom Parsons (rugby union) =

New Zealand rugby union player (born 1990)

- Full name: Thomas Ian Parsons
- Born: 25 June 1990 (age 36) Takapau, New Zealand
- Height: 1.98 m (6 ft 6 in)
- Weight: 113 kg (17 st 11 lb; 249 lb)
- School: Lindisfarne College
- Notable relative: James Parsons (cousin)

Rugby union career
- Position: Lock
- Current team: Hawke's Bay
Senior career
Years	Team	Apps	(Points)
2012–2014, 2018–	Hawke's Bay	106	(80)
2015–2017	Manawatu	29	(0)
2020	Toshiba Brave Lupus Tokyo	4	(0)
2022	Hurricanes	2	(0)
2024–2025	Urayasu D-Rocks	18	(0)
- Correct as of 5 November 2025

Tom Parsons (born 25 June 1990) is a New Zealand rugby union player, who currently plays as a lock for Hawke's Bay in New Zealand's domestic National Provincial Championship competition and Urayasu D-Rocks in Japan Rugby League One.

== Early career and personal life ==
Parsons attended Lindisfarne College (2004-2008) and is a former player and captain of the college's 1st XV team. He is the son of former Hawke's Bay loose forward Rod Parsons (1988-1989, 18 games). His brother Ben Parsons also played 3 games at lock for the Magpies in 2017. Former All Blacks and Blues hooker James Parsons is his cousin.

== Senior career ==
Parsons was – for the first time – named in the Hawke's Bay squad ahead of the 2012 ITM Cup season. He made his NPC debut for the Magpies on 21 September 2012, via the reserves bench, in a tight 42–41 win over Bay of Plenty. In his first three seasons, he played 15 games for the province.

In 2015, Parsons signed with Manawatu. He debuted for the Turbos on 16 August 2015 against Counties Manukau. He played 29 games for Manawatū in three seasons.

Parsons returned to Hawke's Bay and was named in the Magpies squad for the 2018 Mitre 10 Cup season. That season turned out to become his breakout season, in which he became a regular starter for Hawke's Bay. On 23 October 2018, Parsons won the Magpies Player of the Year award and Forward of the Year award at the team's end-of-season awards function.

On 27 November 2019, Japanese club Toshiba Brave Lupus announced the signing of Parsons on a six-month contract for their 2020 Top League season. He made his debut for the club on 18 January 2020 in a game against NTT DoCoMo Red Hurricanes. He played only four games for the side because the 2020 Top League season was cancelled after round 6 due to the COVID-19 pandemic.

He returned to Hawke's Bay for the 2020 Mitre 10 Cup season, which turned out to be a successful one. The Magpies won the Ranfurly Shield, successfully defended the Shield three times and won the Mitre 10 Cup Championship, thus securing a well-deserved promotion to the Premiership division. The Magpies held on to the Shield during the entire 2021 Bunnings NPC season, winning all six Ranfurly Shield defences. Parsons captained the team in the last few rounds of the season, after long-term captain Ash Dixon had left to play in Japan.

Over the years, Parsons turned out for the Hurricanes Development team on a regular basis, but despite several strong seasons for Hawke's Bay, he wasn't offered a Super Rugby contract. During the 2021 Super Rugby season, he was called into the Highlanders squad as short-term injury cover, but didn't get any game time.

While not being named in the initial Hurricanes squad for the 2022 Super Rugby Pacific season, Parsons was eventually offered a contract and joined the franchise during preseason. He made his Super Rugby debut for the Hurricanes – off the bench – on 25 March 2022 against Moana Pasifika. His starting debut followed in the return game against Moana Pasifika on 12 April 2022.

On 15 February 2024, Japan Rugby League One (Division 2) club Urayasu D-Rocks announced that Parsons would be joining the club for the remainder of the 2023–2024 season. He played three games for the club, including two victorious promotion-relegation matches against Hanazono Kintetsu Liners that earned the club promotion to Division 1. On 29 August 2024, Parsons was named in the Urayasu D-Rocks squad for the 2024-25 season. He played 15 games for the club that season.
