= George Bell (rugby union) =

New Zealand rugby union player

- Born: 29 January 2002 (age 24) New Zealand
- Height: 183 cm (6 ft 0 in)
- Weight: 107 kg (236 lb; 16 st 12 lb)
- School: John McGlashan College

Rugby union career
- Position: Hooker
- Current team: Crusaders, Canterbury
Senior career
Years	Team	Apps	(Points)
2022–	Crusaders	15	(15)
2022–	Canterbury	22	(25)
- Correct as of 5 November 2024
International career
Years	Team	Apps	(Points)
2022	New Zealand U20	3	(25)
2024–	New Zealand	2	(5)
- Correct as of 5 November 2024

George Bell (born 29 January 2002) is a New Zealand rugby union player, who plays for the Crusaders in Super Rugby and Canterbury in the Bunnings NPC.

== Early life ==
George grew up on his family farm, Shag Valley Station, in East Otago. George Bell first played for the Eastern Rugby Football Club in Waikouaiti.

Having been a boarder in the John McGlashan College, Bell later joined the Lincoln University as he made it to the Crusaders academy.

== Club career ==
While still yet to play provincial rugby, George Bell made his Super Rugby debut for the Crusaders on the 7 May 2022. He scored a try on debut during this 53–13 win against Western Force in Perth.

== International career ==
George Bell is an under-20 international with New Zealand, having played 4 friendly games with the Baby Blacks in 2021, against Wellington, Tasman, the Cook Islands and a Harlequins XV, as international junior competitions were halted by COVID.

On 20 July 2024 Bell made his All Blacks debut as a replacement in the test match against Fiji, scoring a try in the 77th minute.
