= Louie Chapman =

New Zealand rugby union player

- Full name: Louie Chapman
- Born: 1 May 2000 (age 26) Christchurch, New Zealand
- Height: 179 cm (5 ft 10 in)
- Weight: 84 kg (13 st 3 lb; 185 lb)
- School: Christchurch Boys' High School

Rugby union career
- Position: Halfback
- Current team: Canterbury, Crusaders
Senior career
Years	Team	Apps	(Points)
2020–2024	Tasman	40	(5)
2023, 2026–	Crusaders	6	(0)
2025–	Canterbury	23	(35)
2026–	Edinburgh		
- Correct as of 26 October 2026

Louie J. Chapman is a New Zealand rugby union player who plays for Canterbury in the Bunnings NPC. His position is Halfback.

== Career ==
In September 2020 Chapman was named as an injury replacement in the Tasman Mako squad for the 2020 Mitre 10 Cup. He made his debut for Tasman in Round 2 against Northland at Lansdowne Park in Blenheim. He played 5 games for the Mako in the 2020 season as they went on to win their second premiership title in a row. Chapman had an outstanding 2021 Bunnings NPC as Tasman made the premiership final before losing 23–20 to Waikato. Chapman made his debut for the Crusaders in Round 15 of the 2023 Super Rugby Pacific season starting 70 minutes in a 26–27 loss to the Hurricanes.

Chapman, who is also qualified for Scotland through ancestry, was announced as a signing by Edinburgh Rugby on a two-year contract on 28 April 2026.
