= Jamie Hannah =

New Zealand rugby union player

- Born: 31 October 2002 (age 24) London, England
- Height: 197 cm (6 ft 6 in)
- Weight: 115 kg (254 lb; 18 st 2 lb)

Rugby union career
- Position: Lock
- Current team: Crusaders, Canterbury
Senior career
| Years | Team | Apps | (Points) |
| 2023– | Crusaders | 23 | (0) |
| 2024– | Canterbury | 5 | (5) |
- Correct as of 13 June 2025
International career
| Years | Team | Apps | (Points) |
| 2022 | New Zealand U20 | 2 | (0) |
| 2026 - | New Zealand | 1 | (0) |
- Correct as of 21 August 2026

Jamie Hannah (born 31 October 2002) is a New Zealand rugby union player who plays for the Crusaders in Super Rugby and Canterbury in the Bunnings NPC. His preferred position is lock.

== Early career ==
Hannah attended Christchurch Boys High School, and was named in the New Zealand U20 squad in 2022.

== Professional career ==
Hannah was called into the Crusaders squad ahead of Round 5 of the 2023 Super Rugby Pacific season. He made his debut as a replacement against the Brumbies in Christchurch.
