= Shun Miyake =

Japanese rugby union player

- Born: 28 December 2001 (age 24) Kobe, Japan
- School: Christ's College

Rugby union career
- Position: First five-eighth
- Current team: Canterbury, Mitsubishi Dynaboars
Senior career
Years	Team	Apps	(Points)
2023	Tasman	3	(18)
2024–	Canterbury	11	(31)
2025–	Mitsubishi Dynaboars	15	(34)
- Correct as of 15 August 2026

Shun Miyake (born 28 December 2001) is a Japanese rugby union player, who currently plays as first five-eighth for Canterbury in the Bunnings NPC.

== Early life and career ==
Miyake was born in Kobe, the capital of the Hyōgo Prefecture in Japan. As a 5 year old, he joined Ashiya Rugby School where he started playing rugby. He later attended Konan Boys’ High School and moved to New Zealand in early 2017 to attend Konan Boys' partner school in Christchurch, Christ's College. While at Christ's College, he played three seasons for the school's 1st XV team (2017-2019).

Both in 2018 and 2019, Miyake was invited to attend the development camp of the Crusaders' Under 18 team, the Junior Knights.

After finishing secondary school, Miyake attended the University of Canterbury to study towards a Bachelor of Sport Coaching in Sports Leadership and Management with a minor in Human Resource Management.

In 2020, Miyake played for the Canterbury U19 team.

The following year, Miyake was part of the Crusaders Under 20 team for the 2021 Super Rugby Aotearoa Under 20 tournament. Also in 2021, Miyake played two games for the New Zealand Universities team, scoring 21 points.

In 2022, Miyake played for the Canterbury B team.

== Senior career ==
Miyake made his debut for Tasman in Round 4 of the 2023 Bunnings NPC against North Harbour at Trafalgar Park, coming off the bench in a 20–15 win for the Mako.

== International career ==
Early 2019, Miyake attended a Japan Under 20 camp and was invited to represent Japan at the Oceania Rugby Under 20 Championship in Australia and the World Rugby Under 20 Trophy in Brazil. He was also invited to play for Japan A, Japan's second national rugby union team. Miyake declined the invitation to play for Japan Under 20, because he didn't want to run the risk of getting injured and jeopardise his final season playing for Christ's College. He also turned down the opportunity to play for Japan A, because he feared that that might make it impossible under World Rugby's eligibility rules to realise his dream of one day playing for the All Blacks.
