= Jone Rova =

New Zealand rugby union player

- Born: 12 July 2002 (age 24) Fiji
- Height: 182 cm (6 ft 0 in)
- Weight: 94 kg (207 lb; 14 st 11 lb)

Rugby union career
- Position: Centre
- Current team: Hurricanes, Canterbury
Senior career
Years	Team	Apps	(Points)
2022–	Canterbury	8	(0)
2024	Crusaders	3	
2025–	Hurricanes	2	(5)
- Correct as of 19 November 2023

Jone Rova (born 12 July 2002) is a New Zealand rugby union player, who plays for the Hurricanes and Canterbury. His preferred position is centre.

== Early career ==
Rova is from the village of Vusaratu in Natewa, Cakaudrove Province in Fiji. In 2022, he became the first rugby international from the village when he represented New Zealand U20. He attended New Plymouth Boys' High School where he played for their First XV.

== Professional career ==
Rova has represented Canterbury in the National Provincial Championship since 2022, being named in their full squad for the 2023 Bunnings NPC. He was named in the Crusaders squad for the 2024 Super Rugby Pacific season. He was dropped by the Crusaders in 2025 but was added to the Hurricanes wider training squad.

In 2026, Rova formed part of the Hurricanes squad which won the 2026 Super Rugby Pacific season. On 20 June, the Hurricanes defeated the Chiefs 60–5 in the final.
