= Dallas McLeod =

- Born: 30 April 1999 (age 27) Methven
- Height: 188 cm (6 ft 2 in)
- Weight: 101 kg (223 lb; 15 st 13 lb)
- School: Christ's College

Rugby union career
- Position(s): Centre, Wing
Senior career
Years	Team	Apps	(Points)
2019–2026	Canterbury	48	(85)
2026–	Exeter Chiefs	0	(0)
- Correct as of 12 November 2019
Super Rugby
Years	Team	Apps	(Points)
2020–2026	Crusaders	48	(35)
- Correct as of 12 November 2019
International career
Years	Team	Apps	(Points)
2023	New Zealand	1	(0)

Dallas McLeod (born 30 April 1999) is a New Zealand rugby union player who plays as a second five-eighth and wing for the Crusaders in Super Rugby.

== Club career ==
McLeod signed for the Crusaders squad in 2020.

On 18 February 2026, McLeod signed for Exeter Chiefs in the Premiership Rugby competition from the 2026-27 season.

== International career ==
After becoming a regular starter for the Crusaders that season, McLeod made his test debut for the All Blacks on 5 August 2023 against the Wallabies at Dunedin.

McLeod missed out on selection for the 2023 Rugby World Cup, with his Crusaders teammate David Havili re-called from injury.
