= Josh Te Hira =

New Zealand rugby union player

- Born: Hamilton, New Zealand

Rugby union career
- Position: Hooker
Senior career
Years	Team	Apps	(Points)
2024–2025	Tasman	3	(0)
- Correct as of 7 September 2025

Joshua A. Te Hira is a New Zealand rugby union player. His position is hooker.

== Career ==
Te Hira made his debut for Tasman in Round 8 of the 2024 Bunnings NPC, coming off the bench to become Mako number 241 against Otago in Dunedin. He plays his club rugby for the Kahurangi side in the Tasman region and has played over 50 games for them.
