= Corey Kellow =

New Zealand rugby union player

- Born: 25 May 2001 (age 25) New Zealand
- Height: 190 cm (6 ft 3 in)
- Weight: 110 kg (243 lb; 17 st 5 lb)
- School: Sacred Heart College, Auckland

Rugby union career
- Position: Flanker
- Current team: Canterbury, Crusaders
Senior career
Years	Team	Apps	(Points)
2021–	Canterbury	9	(10)
2022–	Crusaders		
- Correct as of 22 November 2021

Corey Kellow (born 25 May 2001) is a New Zealand rugby union player who plays for the Crusaders in Super Rugby. His playing position is flanker. He was named in the Crusaders squad for the 2022 Super Rugby Pacific season. He has been a member of the Canterbury Bunnings NPC squad since 2021.

Corey Kellow is signed to play for the Gallagher Chiefs in 2027.
