= Zach Gallagher =

New Zealand rugby union player

- Born: 4 September 2001 (age 25)
- Height: 198 cm (6 ft 6 in)
- Weight: 116 kg (256 lb; 18 st 4 lb)
- School: Christ's College
- University: University of Canterbury

Rugby union career
- Position(s): Lock, Flanker
- Current team: Canterbury, Toyota Verblitz
Senior career
Years	Team	Apps	(Points)
2020–	Canterbury	25	(0)
2022–2024	Crusaders	19	(0)
2025	Hurricanes	8	(0)
2025-	Toyota Verblitz	7	(0)
- Correct as of 13 November 2024
International career
Years	Team	Apps	(Points)
2022	All Blacks XV	2	(0)
2025–	Māori All Blacks	1	(0)
- Correct as of 13 November 2024

Zach Gallagher (born 4 September 2001) is a New Zealand rugby union player, who currently plays as a lock for Canterbury in New Zealand's domestic National Provincial Championship competition and the Hurricanes in Super Rugby. He was the 2019 Head Prefect at Christ's College and captain of the school's 1st XV team.
