= Tyson Belworthy =

New Zealand rugby union player

- Born: 6 April 2000 (age 26) New Zealand
- Height: 174 cm (5 ft 9 in)
- Weight: 75 kg (165 lb; 11 st 11 lb)
- School: Shirley Boys' High School

Rugby union career
- Position: Halfback
- Current team: Blues / Canterbury
Senior career
Years	Team	Apps	(Points)
2024–	Canterbury	26	(15)
2027–	Blues	0	(0)
- Correct as of 11 November 2026

Tyson Belworthy (born 6 April 2000) is a New Zealand rugby union player, who plays for the Blues. His preferred position is halfback.

== Early career ==
Belworthy is from New Zealand and attended Shirley Boys' High School. After leaving work, Belworthy trained as a builder while continuing to play club rugby for New Brighton. His club performances earned him selection for Canterbury B from 2020, and in 2026 he won Canterbury's Waitaha Māori Player of the Year award.

== Professional career ==
Belworthy has represented Canterbury in the National Provincial Championship since 2024, being named in their squad for the 2026 Hilux NPC competition. In October 2026, he was named in the Blues wider training group for the 2027 Super Rugby Pacific season.
