= Angus Mabey =

New Zealand rugby union referee

- Born: Angus William Bevin Mabey Wellington, New Zealand

Rugby union career
Refereeing career
| Years | Competition | Apps |
| 2014–pres. | National Provincial Championship | |
| 2022–pres. | Super Rugby | |
- Correct as of 16 February 2022

Angus Mabey is a New Zealand professional rugby union referee.

== Refereeing career ==
Mabey has been refereeing since his early teens, splitting his time between refereeing and as a Radio producer. In 2021, he was named as a member of the New Zealand national referee squad. On 16 February 2022, he was announced as a referee for the 2022 Super Rugby Pacific season, having spent the pre-season as the team referee for Moana Pasifika.
