= Manasa Mataele =

Fiji international rugby union player

- Full name: Manasa Moala Mataele
- Born: 27 November 1996 (age 29) Suva, Fiji
- Height: 185 cm (6 ft 1 in)
- Weight: 100 kg (220 lb; 15 st 10 lb)
- School: Marist Brothers High School
- Notable relative(s): Seta Tamanivalu (uncle); Martha Mataele (wife)

Rugby union career
- Position: Wing
- Current team: Fijian Drua
Senior career
| Years | Team | Apps | (Points) |
| 2016–18 | Taranaki | 21 | (35) |
| 2017-2021 | Crusaders | 32 | (85) |
| 2020- | Canterbury | 27 | (60) |
| 2022-2024 | Western Force | 24 | (40) |
| 2025 | Chiefs | 2 | (5) |
| 2026 | Drua | 2 | |
- Correct as of 10 June 2025
International career
| Years | Team | Apps | (Points) |
| 2022 | Fiji | 4 | (0) |
- Correct as of 10 May 2023

Manasa Moala Mataele (born 27 November 1996) is a Fijian and Tongan rugby union player. He played for Western Force in the Super Rugby. He was signed by the Crusaders in 2016 and has played for them until the 2021 Super Rugby season. He signed for the Chiefs in 2025 and after making 2 appearances only, signed for the Fijian Drua for 2026 season. Mataele plays predominantly as a winger but has played centre and fullback too.

== Career ==
Mataele was born in Suva, Fiji. He attended Marist Brothers High School in Suva. In 2010, he represented the school in the Junior Boys Boys Long Jump in the Coke Light Games and he won a silver medal with a jump of 5.87m. In 2011, he won silver again in the same category jumping 6.00m. In 2013, he took part in 2 events including the Boys Long Jump Intermediate division where he again won a silver medal jumping 6.70m. He was also part of the Intermediate 4x100 metre relay team that won gold. His school was up against Queen Victoria School who had the services of Sevuloni Reece, a winger that plays for Waikato in the Mitre 10 Cup.

He also represented Marist in rugby. In July 2014, he represented Marist in the Southern Zone Secondary Schools rugby competition. He played at centre and scored a try in the under-18 final helping Marist to win the title. He also scooped the man of the match award. He was selected in the Fiji Under-18 side for the Tri Nations matches against Australia and New Zealand Under-18 sides. He scored 2 tries in their 50–15 loss to Australia. His performance for the team saw him getting invited by the Taranaki Rugby Academy to join them as a development player and he played in their sevens and Under-19 teams.

In September 2015, he helped Taranaki beat defending champions, Wellington in the Jock Hobbs Memorial National Under-19 tournament. He scored two-tries in that game.

In August 2016, he was a surprise inclusion in the Taranaki team named for the 2016 Mitre 10 Cup.

Later in that month, he made his debut against Hawke's Bay scoring a 50m try in their 55–28 win. He played alongside his uncle, Seta Tamanivalu who as a youngster, lived with Mataele's family as Tamanivalu's family were from the west (Lautoka) and he studied at Lelean Memorial School which was based in Suva.

In November 2016, he was signed by the Crusaders and he would join his uncle, Tamanivalu and Fijian winger, Jone Macilai-Tori at the club for the 2017 Super Rugby season.

He made his Super Rugby debut on 18 March 2017 against the Blues. He scored a try in the 33–24 win.

Mataele made his international debut for Fiji on 10 July 2021, replacing Nemani Nadolo off the bench, in a 23–57 loss to New Zealand.

== Personal life ==
While staying in New Zealand, he did a Diploma in Building Construction and Architectural Technology at the Western Institute of Technology at Taranaki. His favourite player growing up was Joe Rokocoko. Manasa married Black Fern and Matatu rugby player Martha Mataele (née Lolohea).
