= Manumaua Letiu =

New Zealand rugby union player

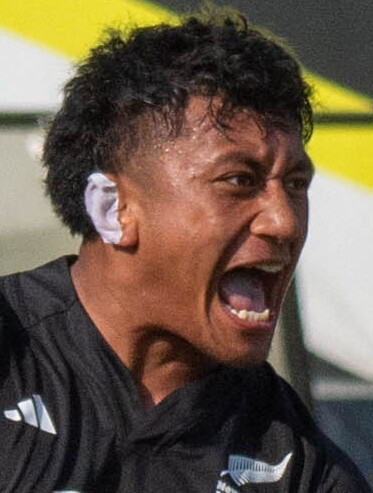
- Letiu in 2025
- Born: 25 September 2005 (age 21) New Zealand
- Height: 178 cm (5 ft 10 in)
- School: Christchurch Boys' High School

Rugby union career
- Position: Hooker
- Current team: Crusaders
Senior career
Years	Team	Apps	(Points)
2025–	Crusaders	1	(0)
- Correct as of 16 February 2025
International career
Years	Team	Apps	(Points)
2024–	New Zealand U20	5	(10)
- Correct as of 16 February 2025

Manumaua Letiu (born 25 September 2005) is a New Zealand rugby union player, who plays for Crusaders. His preferred position is hooker.

== Early career ==
Letiu attended Christchurch Boys' High School where he was head boy and captained the rugby side. He represented New Zealand U20 in 2024.

== Professional career ==
Letiu was called into the Crusaders squad ahead of Round 1 of the 2025 Super Rugby Pacific season. He made his debut in the same round, coming on as a replacement against the Hurricanes.
