= List of 2023–24 Super Rugby transfers (Australia) =

This is a list of player movements for Super Rugby teams prior to the end of the 2024 Super Rugby Pacific season. Departure and arrivals of all players that were included in a Super Rugby squad for 2023 or 2024 are listed here, regardless of when it occurred. Future-dated transfers are only included if confirmed by the player or his agent, his former team or his new team.

Notes

- 2023 players listed are all players that were named in the initial senior squad, or subsequently included in a 23-man match day squad at any game during the season.
- (did not play) denotes that a player did not play at all during the season due to injury or non-selection. These players are included to indicate they were contracted to the team.
- (short-term) denotes that a player wasn't initially contracted, but came in during the season. This could either be a club rugby player coming in as injury cover, or a player whose contract had expired at another team (typically in the northern hemisphere).
- (development squad) denotes a player that wasn't named in the original squad, but was announced as signing as a development player. These are often younger players or club players. Different teams use different names for development players. Other names used include (wider training group) or (wider training squad).
- Flags are only shown for players moving to or from another country.
- Players may play in several positions, but are listed in only one.

== Brumbies ==
Brumbies transfers 2023–2024
Pos	2023 squad	Out	In	2024 players
PR	Allan Alaalatoa; Fred Kaihea; Sefo Kautai; Rhys van Nek (short-term); Tom Ross; Blake Schoupp (short-term); James Slipper; Harry Vella (did not play)	(substituted off) Tom Ross (to Waratahs)		Allan Alaalatoa; Fred Kaihea; Sefo Kautai; Rhys van Nek; Blake Schoupp; James Slipper; Harry Vella
HK	Lachlan Lonergan; Connal McInerney; Billy Pollard; John Ulugia (short-term)	(substituted off) John Ulugia (retired)	(substituted in) Liam Bowron (from Canberra Royals)	Liam Bowron (short-term); Lachlan Lonergan; Connal McInerney; Billy Pollard
LK	Nick Frost; Tom Hooper; Cadeyrn Neville; Darcy Swain; Sam Thomson (short-term); Jack Wright (short-term)	(substituted off) Sam Thomson (to Waratahs); (substituted off) Jack Wright (to (Japan) Shizuoka Blue Revs)	(substituted in) Lachlan Shaw (from Brisbane Boys' College)	Nick Frost; Tom Hooper; Cadeyrn Neville; Lachlan Shaw; Darcy Swain
BR	Jahrome Brown; Charlie Cale; Ed Kennedy (did not play); Luke Reimer; Pete Samu; Rory Scott; Rob Valetini	(substituted off) Pete Samu (to (France) Bordeaux)		Jahrome Brown; Charlie Cale; Ed Kennedy; Luke Reimer; Rory Scott; Rob Valetini
SH	Ryan Lonergan; Pedro Rolando (short-term); Klayton Thorn; Nic White	(substituted off) Pedro Rolando (returned to Canberra Royals); (substituted off) Nic White (to Force)	(substituted in) Harrison Goddard (from Waratahs)	Harrison Goddard; Ryan Lonergan; Klayton Thorn
FH	Nathan Carroll (did not play); Jack Debreczeni; Noah Lolesio	(substituted off) Nathan Carroll (to Queanbeyan Whites)		Jack Debreczeni; Noah Lolesio
CE	Hudson Creighton; Chris Feauai-Sautia (did not play); Len Ikitau; Ollie Sapsford; Tamati Tua	(substituted off) Chris Feauai-Sautia (released)	(substituted in) Austin Anderson (from (New Zealand) Waikato)	Austin Anderson; Hudson Creighton; Len Ikitau; Ollie Sapsford; Tamati Tua
WG	Andy Muirhead; Ben O'Donnell; Corey Toole; Tom Wright			Andy Muirhead; Ben O'Donnell; Corey Toole; Tom Wright
FB	Declan Meredith; Jesse Mogg	(substituted off) Jesse Mogg (retired)		Declan Meredith
Coach	Stephen Larkham			Stephen Larkham

== Force ==
Force transfers 2023–2024
Pos	2023 squad	Out	In	2024 players
PR	Bo Abra; Siosifa Amone; Charlie Hancock; Santiago Medrano; Marley Pearce (short-term); Wilton Rebolo; Tom Robertson; Andrew Romano (did not play); Angus Wagner	(substituted off) Bo Abra (to (New Zealand) Hawke's Bay); (substituted off) Wilton Rebolo (to (United States) RFC Los Angeles); (substituted off) Tom Robertson (sabbatical); (substituted off) Andrew Romano (to Joondalup Brothers)	(substituted in) Josh Bartlett (from (New Zealand) Bay of Plenty); (substituted in) Ryan Coxon (from (New Zealand) Tasman); (substituted in) Joel Hintz (from (South Africa) Sharks); (substituted in) Harry Hoopert (from Reds); (substituted in) Atu Moli (from (New Zealand) Chiefs); (substituted in) Tiaan Tauakipulu (from Waratahs)	Siosifa Amone; Josh Bartlett (short-term); Ryan Coxon (short-term); Charlie Hancock; Joel Hintz (short-term); Harry Hoopert; Santiago Medrano; Atu Moli; Marley Pearce; Tiaan Tauakipulu (short-term); Angus Wagner
HK	Folau Fainga'a; Tom Horton (short-term); Feleti Kaitu'u; Jack Winchester (did not play)	(substituted off) Folau Fainga'a (to (France) Clermont); (substituted off) Jack Winchester (retired)	(substituted in) Ben Funnell (from (New Zealand) Canterbury)	Ben Funnell; Tom Horton; Feleti Kaitu'u
LK	Felix Kalapu; Ryan McCauley; Izack Rodda; Will Sankey (did not play); Jeremy Thrush (short-term); Jeremy Williams	(substituted off) Ryan McCauley (to (France) Valence Romans); (substituted off) Will Sankey (to Easts); (substituted off) Jeremy Thrush (retired)	(substituted in) Sam Carter (from (England) Leicester Tigers); (substituted in) Lopeti Faifua (from Reds); (substituted in) Tom Franklin (from (New Zealand) Taranaki); (substituted in) Titi Nofoagatotoa (from Tuggeranong Vikings)	Sam Carter (short-term); Lopeti Faifua; Tom Franklin; Felix Kalapu; Titi Nofoagatotoa (short-term); Izack Rodda; Jeremy Williams
BR	Tim Anstee; Ollie Callan; Kane Koteka (did not play); Isi Naisarani (short-term); Jacob Norris (short-term); Jackson Pugh; Ned Slack-Smith (did not play); Carlo Tizzano (short-term); Rahboni Warren-Vosayaco (short-term); Michael Wells	(substituted off) Kane Koteka (suspended); (substituted off) Isi Naisarani (released); (substituted off) Jacob Norris (to Moana Pasifika); (substituted off) Jackson Pugh (to (Japan) Skyactivs Hiroshima); (substituted off) Ned Slack-Smith (to Waratahs); (substituted off) Rahboni Warren-Vosayaco (to (France) Brive)	(substituted in) Will Harris (from Waratahs); (substituted in) Reed Prinsep (from (New Zealand) Hurricanes); (substituted in) Papillon Sevele (from Sydney University)	Tim Anstee; Ollie Callan; Will Harris; Reed Prinsep (short-term); Papillon Sevele; Carlo Tizzano; Michael Wells
SH	Issak Fines-Leleiwasa; Ian Prior; Henry Robertson (did not play); Gareth Simpson (short-term)	(substituted off) Henry Robertson (to Sydney University); (substituted off) Gareth Simpson (to (England) Saracens)	(substituted in) Nic White (from Brumbies)	Issak Fines-Leleiwasa; Ian Prior; Nic White
FH	Max Burey (short-term); Bryce Hegarty; Reesjan Pasitoa (did not play)	(substituted off) Bryce Hegarty (to (Japan) Red Hurricanes Osaka)	(substituted in) Ben Donaldson (from Waratahs); (substituted in) Campbell Parata (from (New Zealand) Tasman)	Max Burey; Ben Donaldson; Campbell Parata; Reesjan Pasitoa
CE	Ollie Cummins (did not play); Nikolai Foliaki (short-term); Bayley Kuenzle; Grason Makara (did not play); Sam Spink; Hamish Stewart	(substituted off) Grason Makara (to Wests)	(substituted in) Henry O’Donnell (from Northern Suburbs)	Ollie Cummins; Nikolai Foliaki; Bayley Kuenzle; Henry O’Donnell; Sam Spink; Hamish Stewart
WG	Daniel Ala (did not play); Zach Kibirige (short-term); Manasa Mataele; Rupeni Mataele (did not play); George Poolman; Toni Pulu; Reece Tapine (did not play)	(substituted off) Daniel Ala (to Eastwood); (substituted off) Zach Kibirige (to (France) Biarritz); (substituted off) Manasa Mataele (to (New Zealand) Crusaders); (substituted off) Rupeni Mataele (released); (substituted off) Toni Pulu (to (United States) Seattle Seawolves); (substituted off) Reece Tapine (to UWA)	(substituted in) Ronan Leahy (from UWA); (substituted in) Harry Potter (from (England) Leicester Tigers)	Ronan Leahy (short-term); George Poolman; Harry Potter
FB	Jake Strachan; Chase Tiatia	(substituted off) Jake Strachan (to Rebels)	(substituted in) Kurtley Beale (from Waratahs)	Kurtley Beale (short-term); Chase Tiatia
Coach	Simon Cron			Simon Cron

== Rebels ==
Rebels transfers 2023–2024
Pos	2023 squad	Out	In	2024 players
PR	Isaac Aedo Kailea; Jaiden Christian (did not play); Cabous Eloff; Pone Fa'amausili; Matt Gibbon; Cameron Orr; Sam Talakai	(substituted off) Jaiden Christian (to Brothers); (substituted off) Cameron Orr (to (United States) Seattle Seawolves)	(substituted in) Taniela Tupou (from Reds)	Isaac Aedo Kailea; Cabous Eloff; Pone Fa'amausili; Matt Gibbon; Sam Talakai; Taniela Tupou
HK	Theo Fourie; Alex Mafi; Anaru Rangi; Jordan Uelese	(substituted off) Theo Fourie (to Waratahs); (substituted off) Anaru Rangi (released)	(substituted in) Ethan Dobbins (from Wests)	Ethan Dobbins; Alex Mafi; Jordan Uelese
LK	Josh Canham; Tim Cardall; Trevor Hosea; Matt Philip; Angelo Smith; Tuaina Taii Tualima	(substituted off) Tim Cardall (to (England) Newcastle Falcons); (substituted off) Trevor Hosea (to (Japan) Tokyo Sungoliath); (substituted off) Matt Philip (to (Japan) Yokohama Canon Eagles)	(substituted in) Luke Callan (from Wanneroo); (substituted in) Lukhan Salakaia-Loto (from (England) Northampton Saints)	Luke Callan (short-term); Josh Canham; Lukhan Salakaia-Loto; Angelo Smith; Tuaina Taii Tualima
BR	Vaiolini Ekuasi; Richard Hardwick; Zac Hough (did not play); Tamati Ioane; Josh Kemeny; Rob Leota (did not play); Daniel Maiava; Brad Wilkin	(substituted off) Richard Hardwick (to (England) Ealing Trailfinders); (substituted off) Tamati Ioane (to (Japan) Tokyo Sungoliath)	(substituted in) Maciu Nabolakasi (from Footscray)	Vaiolini Ekuasi; Zac Hough; Josh Kemeny; Rob Leota; Daniel Maiava; Maciu Nabolakasi (short-term); Brad Wilkin
SH	Ryan Louwrens; Moses Sorovi (did not play); James Tuttle	(substituted off) Moses Sorovi (to (Fiji) Drua)	(substituted in) Jack Maunder (from (England) Exeter Chiefs)	Ryan Louwrens; Jack Maunder; James Tuttle
FH	Carter Gordon; Mason Gordon (did not play)		(substituted in) Jake Strachan (from Force)	Carter Gordon; Mason Gordon; Jake Strachan
CE	David Feliuai; Stacey Ili; Nick Jooste; Lebron Naea (did not play); Ray Nu'u (did not play); Lukas Ripley; David Vaihu (did not play)	(substituted off) Stacey Ili (to (New Zealand) Hawke's Bay); (substituted off) Ray Nu'u (to (France) Colomiers)	(substituted in) Filipo Daugunu (from Reds); (substituted in) Divad Palu (from Wyndham); (substituted in) Matt Proctor (from (England) Northampton Saints)	Filipo Daugunu; David Feliuai; Nick Jooste; Lebron Naea; Divad Palu; Matt Proctor; Lukas Ripley; David Vaihu
WG	Lachie Anderson; Monty Ioane; Joe Pincus; Glen Vaihu (did not play); Ilikena Vudogo (did not play)	(substituted off) Monty Ioane (to (France) Lyon); (substituted off) Ilikena Vudogo (to Wests)	(substituted in) Darby Lancaster (from Australia Sevens)	Lachie Anderson; Darby Lancaster; Joe Pincus; Glen Vaihu
FB	Reece Hodge; Andrew Kellaway	(substituted off) Reece Hodge (to (France) Bayonne)		Andrew Kellaway
Coach	Kevin Foote			Kevin Foote

== Reds ==
Reds transfers 2023–2024
Pos	2023 squad	Out	In	2024 players
PR	George Blake; Sef Fa'agase; Harry Hoopert (did not play); Zane Nonggorr; Peni Ravai; Phransis Sula-Siaosi; Taniela Tupou (did not play); Dane Zander	(substituted off) Harry Hoopert (to Force); (substituted off) Phransis Sula-Siaosi (to Souths); (substituted off) Taniela Tupou (to Rebels); (substituted off) Dane Zander (to (United States) Los Angeles)	(substituted in) Massimo de Lutiis (from Canberra Royals); (substituted in) Alex Hodgman (from (New Zealand) Blues); (substituted in) Jeffery Toomaga-Allen (from (Ireland) Ulster)	George Blake; Massimo de Lutiis; Sef Fa'agase; Alex Hodgman; Zane Nonggorr; Peni Ravai; Jeffery Toomaga-Allen
HK	Richie Asiata; Matt Faessler; Josh Nasser (did not play)		(substituted in) Max Craig (from Easts)	Richie Asiata; Max Craig; Matt Faessler; Josh Nasser
LK	Angus Blyth; Wilson Blyth (did not play); Lopeti Faifua; Luke Jones (did not play); Ryan Smith; Jake Upfield (short-term); Connor Vest	(substituted off) Wilson Blyth (to Bond University); (substituted off) Lopeti Faifua (to Force); (substituted off) Luke Jones (retired); (substituted off) Jake Upfield (returned to Bond University)	(substituted in) Cormac Daly (from Randwick); (substituted in) Taine Roiri (from Sunnybank)	Angus Blyth; Cormac Daly; Taine Roiri; Ryan Smith; Connor Vest
BR	Connor Anderson; Fraser McReight; Keynan Tauakipulu (did not play); Seru Uru; Harry Wilson; Liam Wright	(substituted off) Keynan Tauakipulu (to Wests)	(substituted in) Joe Brial (from (New Zealand) Canterbury); (substituted in) John Bryant (from Souths)	Connor Anderson; Joe Brial; John Bryant; Fraser McReight; Seru Uru; Harry Wilson; Liam Wright
SH	Spencer Jeans (did not play); Tate McDermott; Kalani Thomas; Louis Werchon (short-term, did not play)	(substituted off) Spencer Jeans (to Bond University)		Tate McDermott; Kalani Thomas; Louis Werchon
FH	Lawson Creighton; Tom Lynagh; James O'Connor		(substituted in) Harry McLaughlin-Phillips (from Souths)	Lawson Creighton; Tom Lynagh; Harry McLaughlin-Phillips; James O'Connor
CE	Taj Annan (short-term); Josh Flook; Isaac Henry; Hunter Paisami		(substituted in) Frankie Goldsbrough (from Easts)	Taj Annan; Josh Flook; Frankie Goldsbrough; Isaac Henry; Hunter Paisami
WG	Filipo Daugunu; Mac Grealy; Jordan Petaia; Suliasi Vunivalu	(substituted off) Filipo Daugunu (to Rebels)	(substituted in) Tim Ryan (from Brothers)	Mac Grealy; Jordan Petaia; Tim Ryan; Suliasi Vunivalu
FB	Floyd Aubrey (did not play); Jock Campbell; Paddy James (short-term)	(substituted off) Paddy James (returned to Brothers)		Floyd Aubrey; Jock Campbell
Coach	Brad Thorn	(substituted off) Brad Thorn (released)	(substituted in) Les Kiss (from (England) London Irish)	Les Kiss

== Waratahs ==
Waratahs transfers 2023–2024
Pos	2023 squad	Out	In	2024 players
PR	Angus Bell; Daniel Botha (short-term); Tetera Faulkner; Archer Holz; Harry Johnson-Holmes; Tom Lambert; Sateki Latu (short-term); Nephi Leatigaga (short-term); Tiaan Tauakipulu	(substituted off) Tetera Faulkner (to Southern Districts); (substituted off) Sateki Latu (to Moana Pasifika); (substituted off) Nephi Leatigaga (to (France) Dax); (substituted off) Tiaan Tauakipulu (to Force)	(substituted in) Brad Amituanai (from Sydney University); (substituted in) Jack Barrett (from Randwick); (substituted in) Pone Fa'amausili (from Rebels); (substituted in) Harry Lloyd (from Brothers); (substituted in) Enrique Pieretto (from (Scotland) Glasgow Warriors); (substituted in) Lewis Ponini (from Eastern Suburbs); (substituted in) Tom Ross (from Brumbies); (substituted in) Paddy Ryan (from (Japan) Black Rams Tokyo); (substituted in) Michael Scott (from Northern Suburbs); (substituted in) Hayden Thompson-Stringer (from (France) La Rochelle); (substituted in) George Thornton (from Northern Suburbs)	Brad Amituanai (short-term); Jack Barrett (short-term); Angus Bell; Daniel Botha; Archer Holz; Pone Fa'amausili (short-term); Harry Johnson-Holmes; Tom Lambert; Harry Lloyd (short-term); Enrique Pieretto (short-term); Lewis Ponini (short-term); Tom Ross; Paddy Ryan (short-term); Michael Scott (short-term); Hayden Thompson-Stringer; George Thornton (short-term)
HK	Tolu Latu; Dave Porecki; Mahe Vailanu	(substituted off) Tolu Latu (to (France) Montpellier)	(substituted in) Jay Fonokalafi (from Gordon); (substituted in) Theo Fourie (from Rebels); (substituted in) Julian Heaven (from Eastern Suburbs); (substituted in) Ben Sugars (from Randwick)	Jay Fonokalafi (short-term); Theo Fourie; Julian Heaven (short-term); Dave Porecki; Ben Sugars (short-term); Mahe Vailanu
LK	Ned Hanigan; Jed Holloway; Zane Marolt (did not play); Taleni Seu; Hugh Sinclair; Ola Tauelangi (short-term, did not play); Zac Von Appen	(substituted off) Zane Marolt (to Eastern Suburbs); (substituted off) Taleni Seu (to (Japan) Toyota Industries Shuttles Aichi); (substituted off) Ola Tauelangi (to Moana Pasifika); (substituted off) Zac Von Appen (to Sydney University)	(substituted in) Miles Amatosero (from (France) Clermont); (substituted in) Sam Thomson (from Brumbies)	Miles Amatosero; Ned Hanigan; Jed Holloway; Hugh Sinclair; Sam Thomson (short-term)
BR	Charlie Gamble; Langi Gleeson; Will Harris; Michael Hooper; Michael Icely (short-term); Lachlan Swinton; Hunter Ward (short-term)	(substituted off) Will Harris (to Force); (substituted off) Michael Hooper (to Australia Sevens); (substituted off) Michael Icely (returned to Eastwood)	(substituted in) Mesu Kunavula (from (France) Brive); (substituted in) Fergus Lee-Warner (from (England) Bath); (substituted in) Sione Misiloi (from Randwick); (substituted in) Ned Slack-Smith (from Force)	Charlie Gamble; Langi Gleeson; Mesu Kunavula; Fergus Lee-Warner; Sione Misiloi (short-term); Ned Slack-Smith; Lachlan Swinton; Hunter Ward (short-term)
SH	Harrison Goddard; Jake Gordon; Teddy Wilson	(substituted off) Harrison Goddard (to Brumbies)	(substituted in) Jack Grant (from (England) Ealing Trailfinders)	Jake Gordon; Jack Grant; Teddy Wilson
FH	Jack Bowen; Ben Donaldson; Tane Edmed; Will Harrison (did not play)	(substituted off) Ben Donaldson (to Force)		Jack Bowen; Tane Edmed; Will Harrison
CE	Lalakai Foketi; Izaia Perese; Mosese Tuipulotu; Joey Walton			Lalakai Foketi; Izaia Perese; Mosese Tuipulotu; Joey Walton
WG	Ben Dowling; Nemani Nadolo; Mark Nawaqanitawase; Dylan Pietsch; Harry Wilson	(substituted off) Nemani Nadolo (retired); (substituted off) Ben Dowling (to Australia Sevens)	(substituted in) Vuate Karawalevu (from Sydney Roosters); (substituted in) Triston Reilly (from Wests Tigers)	Vuate Karawalevu; Mark Nawaqanitawase; Dylan Pietsch; Triston Reilly; Harry Wilson
FB	Kurtley Beale (did not play); Max Jorgensen	(substituted off) Kurtley Beale (to Force)		Max Jorgensen
Coach	Darren Coleman			Darren Coleman

== See also ==
- List of 2023–24 Premiership Rugby transfers
- List of 2023–24 United Rugby Championship transfers
- List of 2023–24 Top 14 transfers
- List of 2023–24 RFU Championship transfers
- List of 2023–24 Rugby Pro D2 transfers
- List of 2023–24 Major League Rugby transfers
- SANZAAR
- Super Rugby franchise areas
