= List of 2022–23 Super Rugby transfers (Australia) =

This is a list of player movements for Super Rugby teams prior to the end of the 2023 Super Rugby Pacific season. Departure and arrivals of all players that were included in a Super Rugby squad for 2022 or 2023 are listed here, regardless of when it occurred. Future-dated transfers are only included if confirmed by the player or his agent, his former team or his new team.

Notes

- 2022 players listed are all players that were named in the initial senior squad, or subsequently included in a 23-man match day squad at any game during the season.
- (did not play) denotes that a player did not play at all during the season due to injury or non-selection. These players are included to indicate they were contracted to the team.
- (short-term) denotes that a player wasn't initially contracted, but came in during the season. This could either be a club rugby player coming in as injury cover, or a player whose contract had expired at another team (typically in the northern hemisphere).
- (development squad) denotes a player that wasn't named in the original squad, but was announced as signing as a development player. These are often younger players or club players. Different teams use different names for development players. Other names used include (wider training group) or (wider training squad).
- Flags are only shown for players moving to or from another country.
- Players may play in several positions, but are listed in only one.

== Brumbies ==
Brumbies transfers 2022–2023
| Pos | 2022 squad | Out | In | 2023 players |
|---|---|---|---|---|
| PR | Allan Alaalatoa; Fred Kaihea; Sefo Kautai; Tom Ross; Scott Sio; James Slipper | (substituted off) Scott Sio (to (England) Exeter Chiefs) | (substituted on) Blake Schoupp (from Southern Districts); (substituted on) Rhys van Nek (from Rebels); (substituted on) Harry Vella (from Canberra Royals) | Allan Alaalatoa; Fred Kaihea; Sefo Kautai; Tom Ross; Blake Schoupp (short-term); James Slipper; Rhys van Nek (short-term); Harry Vella |
| HK | Folau Fainga'a; Lachlan Lonergan; Connal McInerney; Billy Pollard | (substituted off) Folau Fainga'a (to Force) | (substituted on) John Ulugia (unattached) | Lachlan Lonergan; Connal McInerney; Billy Pollard; John Ulugia (short-term) |
| LK | Nick Frost; Tom Hooper; Cadeyrn Neville; Darcy Swain | | (substituted on) Sam Thomson (from Warringah); (substituted on) Jack Wright (from Tuggeranong Vikings) | Nick Frost; Tom Hooper; Cadeyrn Neville; Darcy Swain; Sam Thomson (short-term); Jack Wright (short-term) |
| BR | Jahrome Brown; Ed Kennedy; Luke Reimer; Pete Samu; Rory Scott; Rob Valetini | | (substituted on) Charlie Cale (from Uni-Norths Owls) | Jahrome Brown; Charlie Cale; Ed Kennedy; Luke Reimer; Pete Samu; Rory Scott; Rob Valetini |
| SH | Lachie Albert; Ryan Lonergan; Nic White | (substituted off) Lachie Albert (to Eastwood) | (substituted on) Pedro Rolando (from Canberra Royals); (substituted on) Klayton Thorn (from Gungahlin Eagles) | Ryan Lonergan; Pedro Rolando (short-term); Klayton Thorn; Nic White |
| FH | Rodney Iona; Noah Lolesio | (substituted off) Rodney Iona (to (United States) New Orleans Gold) | (substituted on) Nathan Carroll (from Queanbeyan Whites); (substituted on) Jack Debreczeni (from (Japan) Hino Red Dolphins) | Nathan Carroll; Jack Debreczeni; Noah Lolesio |
| CE | Hudson Creighton; Chris Feauai-Sautia; Len Ikitau; Ollie Sapsford; Irae Simone | (substituted off) Irae Simone (to (France) Clermont) | (substituted on) Tamati Tua (from (New Zealand) Blues) | Hudson Creighton; Chris Feauai-Sautia; Len Ikitau; Ollie Sapsford; Tamati Tua |
| WG | Cam Clark; Andy Muirhead; Tom Wright | (substituted off) Cam Clark (released) | (substituted on) Ben O'Donnell (from (Ireland) Connacht); (substituted on) Corey Toole (from Australia Sevens) | Andy Muirhead; Ben O'Donnell; Corey Toole; Tom Wright |
| FB | Tom Banks; Jesse Mogg | (substituted off) Tom Banks (to (Japan) Mie Honda Heat) | (substituted on) Declan Meredith (from Wests Lions) | Declan Meredith; Jesse Mogg |
| Coach | Dan McKellar | (substituted off) Dan McKellar (to Australia (assistant)) | (substituted on) Stephen Larkham (from (Ireland) Munster) | Stephen Larkham |

== Force ==
Force transfers 2022–2023
| Pos | 2022 squad | Out | In | 2023 players |
|---|---|---|---|---|
| PR | Bo Abra; Greg Holmes; Harry Lloyd; Santiago Medrano; Tom Robertson; Angus Wagner | (substituted off) Greg Holmes (retired); (substituted off) Harry Lloyd (released) | (substituted on) Siosifa Amone (from Associates); (substituted on) Charlie Hancock (from Sydney University); (substituted on) Marley Pearce (from Joondalup); (substituted on) Wilton Rebolo (from (United States) Rugby New York); (substituted on) Andrew Romano (from Cottesloe) | Bo Abra; Siosifa Amone; Charlie Hancock; Santiago Medrano; Marley Pearce (short-term); Wilton Rebolo; Tom Robertson; Andrew Romano; Angus Wagner |
| HK | Feleti Kaitu'u; Andrew Ready; Jack Winchester | (substituted off) Andrew Ready (to (France) Colomiers) | (substituted on) Folau Fainga'a (from Brumbies); (substituted on) Tom Horton (from Waratahs) | Folau Fainga'a; Tom Horton (short-term); Feleti Kaitu'u; Jack Winchester |
| LK | Ryan McCauley; Will Sankey (short-term); Jeremy Thrush | | (substituted on) Felix Kalapu (from (United States) Old Glory DC); (substituted on) Jeremy Williams (from Waratahs) | Felix Kalapu; Ryan McCauley; Izack Rodda; Will Sankey; Jeremy Thrush (short-term); Jeremy Williams |
| BR | Tim Anstee; Ollie Callan; Kane Koteka; Fergus Lee-Warner; Alex Masibaka (short-term); Jackson Pugh; Izack Rodda; Brynard Stander | (substituted off) Fergus Lee-Warner (to (England) Worcester Warriors); (substituted off) Alex Masibaka (to (France) Montpellier); (substituted off) Brynard Stander (released) | (substituted on) Isi Naisarani (from (Japan) Shizuoka Blue Revs); (substituted on) Jacob Norris (from (New Zealand) Bay of Plenty); (substituted on) Ned Slack-Smith (from Warringah); (substituted on) Carlo Tizzano (from Waratahs); (substituted on) Rahboni Warren-Vosayaco (from Waratahs); (substituted on) Michael Wells (from Rebels) | Tim Anstee; Ollie Callan; Kane Koteka; Isi Naisarani (short-term); Jacob Norris (short-term); Jackson Pugh; Ned Slack-Smith; Carlo Tizzano (short-term); Rahboni Warren-Vosayaco (short-term); Michael Wells |
| SH | Issak Fines-Leleiwasa; Michael McDonald; Ian Prior | (substituted off) Michael McDonald (to (Ireland) Ulster) | (substituted on) Henry Robertson (from Waratahs); (substituted on) Gareth Simpson (from (England) Saracens) | Issak Fines-Leleiwasa; Ian Prior; Henry Robertson; Gareth Simpson (short-term) |
| FH | Bayley Kuenzle; Jake McIntyre; Reesjan Pasitoa | (substituted off) Jake McIntyre (to (France) Perpignan) | (substituted on) Max Burey (from Australia Sevens); (substituted on) Bryce Hegarty (from (England) Leicester Tigers); (substituted on) Hamish Stewart (from Reds) | Max Burey (short-term); Bryce Hegarty; Bayley Kuenzle; Reesjan Pasitoa; Hamish Stewart |
| CE | Kyle Godwin; Richard Kahui; Grason Makara | (substituted off) Kyle Godwin (to (France) Lyon); (substituted off) Richard Kahui (retired) | (substituted on) Oliver Cummins (from Scots College); (substituted on) Nikolai Foliaki (from (New Zealand) Counties Manukau); (substituted on) George Poolman (from Sydney University); (substituted on) Sam Spink (from (England) Wasps) | Oliver Cummins; Nikolai Foliaki (short-term); Grason Makara; George Poolman; Sam Spink |
| WG | Daniel Ala (did not play); Brad Lacey; Manasa Mataele; Toni Pulu; Byron Ralston; Reece Tapine | (substituted off) Brad Lacey (released); (substituted off) Byron Ralston (to (Ireland) Connacht) | (substituted on) Zach Kibirige (from (England) Wasps); (substituted on) Rupeni Mataele (from Scots College) | Daniel Ala; Zach Kibirige (short-term); Manasa Mataele; Rupeni Mataele; Toni Pulu; Reece Tapine |
| FB | Jack McGregor; Jake Strachan | (substituted off) Jack McGregor (to Gordon) | (substituted on) Chase Tiatia (from (New Zealand) Chiefs) | Jake Strachan; Chase Tiatia |
| Coach | Tim Sampson | (substituted off) Tim Sampson (to Rebels (assistant coach)) | (substituted on) Simon Cron (from (Japan) Toyota Verblitz) | Simon Cron |

== Rebels ==
Rebels transfers 2022–2023
| Pos | 2022 squad | Out | In | 2023 players |
|---|---|---|---|---|
| PR | Isaac Aedo Kailea (wider-training squad); Cabous Eloff; Sef Fa'agase (short-term); Pone Fa'amausili; Matt Gibbon; Patrick Lavemai (did not play); Cameron Orr; Emosi Tuqiri (wider-training squad, did not play); Rhys van Nek | (substituted off) Sef Fa'agase (to Reds); (substituted off) Patrick Lavemai (to academy squad); (substituted off) Emosi Tuqiri (to (Fiji) Drua); (substituted off) Rhys van Nek (to Brumbies) | (substituted on) Jaiden Christian (from Brothers); (substituted on) Sam Talakai (from (Japan) Tokyo Sungoliath) | Isaac Aedo Kailea; Jaiden Christian; Cabous Eloff; Pone Fa'amausili; Matt Gibbon; Cameron Orr; Sam Talakai |
| HK | James Hanson; Efi Ma'afu; Jordan Uelese | (substituted off) James Hanson (retired); (substituted off) Efi Ma'afu (to (France) Rouen) | (substituted on) Theo Fourie (from Souths); (substituted on) Alex Mafi (from Reds); (substituted on) Anaru Rangi (from (Japan) Urayasu D-Rocks) | Theo Fourie; Alex Mafi; Anaru Rangi; Jordan Uelese |
| LK | Josh Canham; Ross Haylett-Petty; Josh Hill (short-term); Trevor Hosea; Tom Nowlan; Matt Philip | (substituted off) Ross Haylett-Petty (to Randwick); (substituted off) Josh Hill (returned to (New Zealand) Otago); (substituted off) Tom Nowlan (to (Japan) Shimizu Koto Blue Sharks) | (substituted on) Tim Cardall (from (England) Wasps); (substituted on) Angelo Smith (from Wests); (substituted on) Tuaina Taii Tualima (from Reds) | Josh Canham; Tim Cardall; Trevor Hosea; Matt Philip; Angelo Smith; Tuaina Taii Tualima |
| BR | Richard Hardwick; Eyda Haisila (did not play); Michael Icely (wider-training squad, did not play); Tamati Ioane; Josh Kemeny; Rob Leota; Sione Lolesio (wider-training squad, did not play); Daniel Maiava; Antonio Masina (did not play); Joeli Niubalavu (did not play); Sam Wallis (short-term); Michael Wells; Brad Wilkin | (substituted off) Eyda Haisila (to academy squad); (substituted off) Michael Icely (to Waratahs); (substituted off) Sione Lolesio (to academy squad); (substituted off) Antonio Masina (to academy squad); (substituted off) Joeli Niubalavu (to academy squad); (substituted off) Sam Wallis (to University of Queensland); (substituted off) Michael Wells (to Force) | (substituted on) Vaiolini Ekuasi (from (New Zealand) Blues); (substituted on) Zac Hough (from Wests) | Vaiolini Ekuasi; Richard Hardwick; Zac Hough; Tamati Ioane; Josh Kemeny; Rob Leota; Daniel Maiava; Brad Wilkin |
| SH | Joe Powell; Moses Sorovi; James Tuttle | (substituted off) Joe Powell (to (England) London Irish) | (substituted on) Ryan Louwrens (from (United States) Austin Gilgronis) | Ryan Louwrens; Moses Sorovi; James Tuttle |
| FH | Carter Gordon; Mason Gordon (wider-training squad, did not play); Nick Jooste (short-term); Sebastian Sialau (did not play) | (substituted off) Sebastian Sialau (to academy squad) | | Carter Gordon; Mason Gordon; Nick Jooste |
| CE | Stacey Ili; Lebron Naea (did not play); Ray Nu'u; Lukas Ripley; Jeral Skelton (did not play); Young Tonumaipea; Matt To'omua | (substituted off) Jeral Skelton (to Canterbury Bulldogs); (substituted off) Young Tonumaipea (to Melbourne Storm); (substituted off) Matt To'omua (to (Japan) Mitsubishi DynaBoars) | (substituted on) David Feliuai (from (Romania) Baia Mare); (substituted on) David Vaihu (from academy squad) | David Feliuai; Stacey Ili; Lebron Naea; Ray Nu'u; Lukas Ripley; David Vaihu |
| WG | Lachie Anderson; Andrew Kellaway; Divad Palu (did not play); Joe Pincus (did not play); Glen Vaihu (short-term); Ilikena Vudogo | (substituted off) Divad Palu (to academy squad) | (substituted on) Monty Ioane (from (Italy) Benetton) | Lachie Anderson; Monty Ioane; Andrew Kellaway; Joe Pincus; Glen Vaihu; Ilikena Vudogo |
| FB | Reece Hodge; George Worth | (substituted off) George Worth (to Eastwood) | | Reece Hodge |
| Coach | Kevin Foote | | | Kevin Foote |

== Reds ==
Reds transfers 2022–2023
| Pos | 2022 squad | Out | In | 2023 players |
|---|---|---|---|---|
| PR | Albert Anae (short-term); Sef Fa'agase (short-term); Feao Fotuaika; Harry Hoopert; Zane Nonggorr; Taniela Tupou; Dane Zander | (substituted off) Albert Anae (released); (substituted off) Feao Fotuaika (to (France) Lyon) | (substituted on) Peni Ravai (unattached); (substituted on) Phransis Sula-Siaosi (from Souths) | Sef Fa'agase; Harry Hoopert; Zane Nonggorr; Peni Ravai; Phransis Sula-Siaosi; Taniela Tupou; Dane Zander |
| HK | Richie Asiata; George Blake (development squad, did not play); Matt Faessler (short-term); Alex Mafi; Josh Nasser | (substituted off) Alex Mafi (to Rebels) | | Richie Asiata; George Blake; Matt Faessler; Josh Nasser |
| LK | Angus Blyth; Lopeti Faifua; Lukhan Salakaia-Loto; Ryan Smith; Tuaina Taii Tualima; Connor Vest (short-term) | (substituted off) Lukhan Salakaia-Loto (to (England) Northampton Saints); (substituted off) Tuaina Taii Tualima (to Rebels) | (substituted on) Wilson Blyth (from Bond University); (substituted on) Luke Jones (from (France) Racing 92); (substituted on) Jake Upfield (from Bond University) | Angus Blyth; Wilson Blyth; Lopeti Faifua; Luke Jones; Ryan Smith; Jake Upfield (short-term); Connor Vest |
| BR | Fraser McReight; Angus Scott-Young; Seru Uru; Harry Wilson; Liam Wright | (substituted off) Angus Scott-Young (to (England) Northampton Saints) | (substituted on) Connor Anderson (from Wests); (substituted on) Keynan Tauakipulu (from Wests) | Connor Anderson; Fraser McReight; Keynan Tauakipulu; Seru Uru; Harry Wilson; Liam Wright |
| SH | Spencer Jeans; Tate McDermott; Kalani Thomas | | (substituted on) Louis Werchon (from Wests) | Spencer Jeans; Tate McDermott; Kalani Thomas; Louis Werchon (short-term) |
| FH | Lawson Creighton; Tom Lynagh (did not play); James O'Connor | | | Lawson Creighton; Tom Lynagh; James O'Connor |
| CE | Josh Flook; Isaac Henry; Hunter Paisami; Jordan Petaia; Hamish Stewart | (substituted off) Hamish Stewart (to Force) | | Josh Flook; Isaac Henry; Hunter Paisami; Jordan Petaia |
| WG | Jock Campbell; Filipo Daugunu; Ilaisa Droasese; Suliasi Vunivalu | (substituted off) Ilaisa Droasese (to (Fiji) Drua) | | Jock Campbell; Filipo Daugunu; Suliasi Vunivalu |
| FB | Floyd Aubrey (short-term); Mac Grealy | | (substituted on) Taj Annan (from Souths); (substituted on) Paddy James (from Brothers) | Taj Annan (short-term); Floyd Aubrey; Mac Grealy; Paddy James (short-term) |
| Coach | Brad Thorn | | | Brad Thorn |

== Waratahs ==
Waratahs transfers 2022–2023
| Pos | 2022 squad | Out | In | 2023 players |
|---|---|---|---|---|
| PR | Angus Bell; Adrian Brown (wider training squad, did not play); Tetera Faulkner; Archer Holz (wider training squad); Harry Johnson-Holmes; Paddy Ryan (short-term); Ruan Smith; Tiaan Tauakipulu; Hamdahn Tuipulotu (wider training squad, did not play) | (substituted off) Adrian Brown (to Eastwood); (substituted off) Paddy Ryan (to (United States) San Diego Legion); (substituted off) Ruan Smith (to (South Africa) Lions); (substituted off) Hamdahn Tuipulotu (to (New Zealand) Auckland) | (substituted on) Daniel Botha (from Sydney University); (substituted on) Tom Lambert (from (Scotland) Glasgow Warriors); (substituted on) Sateki Latu (from Warringah); (substituted on) Nephi Leatigaga (from (England) Leicester Tigers) | Angus Bell; Daniel Botha (short-term); Tetera Faulkner; Archer Holz; Harry Johnson-Holmes; Tom Lambert; Sateki Latu (short-term); Nephi Leatigaga (short-term); Tiaan Tauakipulu |
| HK | Ed Craig (short-term); Tom Horton; Dave Porecki; Mahe Vailanu (short-term) | (substituted off) Ed Craig (to Eastwood); (substituted off) Tom Horton (to Force) | (substituted on) Tolu Latu (from (France) Stade Français) | Tolu Latu; Dave Porecki; Mahe Vailanu |
| LK | Hugh Bokenham (did not play); Geoff Cridge; Max Douglas; Jed Holloway; Hugh Sinclair; Jeremy Williams (wider training squad) | (substituted off) Hugh Bokenham (to Sydney University); (substituted off) Geoff Cridge (to (France) Bayonne); (substituted off) Max Douglas (to (Japan) Yokohama Canon Eagles); (substituted off) Jeremy Williams (to Force) | (substituted on) Zane Marolt (from Queanbeyan Whites; (substituted on) Taleni Seu (from (Japan) Toyota Industries Shuttles Aichi); (substituted on) Ola Tauelangi (from Gordon); (substituted on) Zac Von Appen (from Sydney University | Jed Holloway; Zane Marolt; Taleni Seu; Hugh Sinclair; Ola Tauelangi (short-term); Zac Von Appen |
| BR | Charlie Gamble (wider training squad); Langi Gleeson (wider training squad); Ned Hanigan; Will Harris; Michael Hooper; Lachlan Swinton; Carlo Tizzano; Rahboni Warren-Vosayaco | (substituted off) Carlo Tizzano (to Force); (substituted off) Rahboni Warren-Vosayaco (to Force) | (substituted on) Michael Icely (from Rebels); (substituted on) Hunter Ward (from Manly) | Charlie Gamble; Langi Gleeson; Ned Hanigan; Will Harris; Michael Hooper; Michael Icely (short-term); Lachlan Swinton; Hunter Ward (short-term) |
| SH | Jake Gordon; Jack Grant; Henry Robertson (wider training squad); Teddy Wilson (short-term) | (substituted off) Jack Grant (to (England) Ealing Trailfinders); (substituted off) Henry Robertson (to Force) | (substituted on) Harrison Goddard (from (United States) LA Giltinis) | Harrison Goddard; Jake Gordon; Teddy Wilson |
| FH | Ben Donaldson; Tane Edmed | | (substituted on) Jack Bowen (from Eastern Suburbs) | Jack Bowen; Ben Donaldson; Tane Edmed |
| CE | Lalakai Foketi; Izaia Perese; Jamie Roberts; Mosese Tuipulotu (wider training squad, did not play); Joey Walton (did not play) | (substituted off) Jamie Roberts (retired) | | Lalakai Foketi; Izaia Perese; Mosese Tuipulotu; Joey Walton |
| WG | Mark Nawaqanitawase; Alex Newsome; Dylan Pietsch (wider training squad); James Ramm; Triston Reilly; James Turner (short-term) | (substituted off) Alex Newsome (to (France) Clermont); (substituted off) James Ramm (to (England) Northampton Saints); (substituted off) Triston Reilly (to Wests Tigers); (substituted off) James Turner (to Australia Sevens) | (substituted on) Ben Dowling (from Randwick); (substituted on) Nemani Nadolo (from (England) Leicester Tigers); (substituted on) Harry Wilson (from Eastwood) | Ben Dowling; Nemani Nadolo; Mark Nawaqanitawase; Dylan Pietsch; Harry Wilson |
| FB | Kurtley Beale (short-term); Tevita Funa; Will Harrison | (substituted off) Tevita Funa (to Western Sydney Two Blues) | (substituted on) Max Jorgensen (from St Joseph's College) | Kurtley Beale; Will Harrison; Max Jorgensen |
| Coach | Darren Coleman | | | Darren Coleman |

== See also ==
- List of 2022–23 Premiership Rugby transfers
- List of 2022–23 United Rugby Championship transfers
- List of 2022–23 Top 14 transfers
- List of 2022–23 RFU Championship transfers
- List of 2022–23 Rugby Pro D2 transfers
- List of 2022–23 Major League Rugby transfers
- SANZAAR
- Super Rugby franchise areas
