= 2023 Super Rugby Pacific season =

Men's rugby union club competition

2023 Super Rugby Pacific Season
- Dates: 24 February – 24 June 2023
- Countries: Australia (5 teams); Fiji (1 team); New Zealand (5 teams); Pacific Islands (1 team)
- Tournament format(s): Round-robin and Knockout
- Champions: Crusaders (12th title)
- Matches played: 91
- Tries scored: 731 (8.03 per match)
- Top point scorer(s): (New Zealand) Damian McKenzie, Chiefs (191)
- Top try scorer(s): (New Zealand) Leicester Fainga'anuku, Crusaders (13)
- Official website: super.rugby/superrugby

The 2023 Super Rugby Pacific Season (known as Harvey Norman Super Rugby Pacific in Australia, Shop N Save Super Rugby Pacific in Fiji and DHL Super Rugby Pacific in New Zealand) was the 28th season of Super Rugby, an annual rugby union competition organised by SANZAAR between teams from Australia, Fiji, New Zealand and a combined team from Samoa, Tonga and other Pacific Island nations. The defending champions were the Crusaders, who won their 11th title in 2022.

The tournament followed a similar schedule to the 2022 season, with 84 matches played in a round-robin, followed by finals in a knockout format. The season was expected to run from Friday 24 February 2023, culminating in a final to be played on Saturday 24 June, before the start of the 2023 mid-year international window.

The Fijian Drua, who were based in Australia for the 2022 season due to complications surrounding the COVID-19 pandemic, opened their permanent home base in Nadi, Fiji ahead of the 2023 season. In 2023, the team played its home games at Churchill Park in Lautoka and HFC Bank Stadium in Suva. Moana Pasifika continued to be based in Auckland, New Zealand, but played a match at Apia Park in Samoa in 2023. The Waratahs also had a new home venue in 2023, moving to the newly built Allianz Stadium.

== Competition format ==
Similarly to the 2022 season, the 12 participating teams each played 14 regular season games: 7 home games and 7 away games, although the 2023 season once again featured a Super Round, during which all teams played their round 2 games at AAMI Park in Melbourne. All six fixtures of Round 2 were held at the stadium between Friday 3 March and Sunday 5 March. The 14 games included 11 round-robin games against the other participating teams and 3 additional "rivalry" games (derby matches), in which they played another team for the second time in a home-and-away format. Each team also had one bye week.

The teams were ranked 1 to 12 on one competition table based on competition points earned during the regular season. The top eight teams at the conclusion of the regular season qualified for the play-offs. In the quarter-finals, the first-ranked team played the eighth-ranked team, the second-ranked team played the seventh-ranked, the third-ranked played the sixth-ranked and the fourth-ranked team played the fifth-ranked. The quarter-final winners progressed to the semi-finals, and the winners of the semi-finals advanced to the final. The higher ranked team hosted each play-off match.

== Standings ==
2023 Super Rugby Pacific standings
Pos	Team	Pld	W	D	L	PF	PA	PD	TF	TA	TB	LB	Pts	Qualification
1	Chiefs (RU)	14	13	0	1	487	261	+226	65	38	6	1	59	Quarter-finals
2	Crusaders (C)	14	10	0	4	457	278	+179	65	36	6	2	48	Quarter-finals
3	Blues	14	10	0	4	446	292	+154	60	39	3	3	46	Quarter-finals
4	Brumbies	14	10	0	4	474	393	+81	66	52	5	1	46	Quarter-finals
5	Hurricanes	14	9	0	5	480	338	+142	70	47	3	2	41	Quarter-finals
6	Waratahs	14	6	0	8	387	408	−21	54	53	4	3	31	Quarter-finals
7	Drua	14	6	0	8	370	492	−122	54	73	1	1	26	Quarter-finals
8	Reds	14	5	0	9	391	451	−60	54	61	1	3	24	Quarter-finals
9	Highlanders	14	5	0	9	362	459	−97	48	60	2	2	24	
10	Force	14	5	0	9	346	494	−148	46	70	1	1	22	
11	Rebels	14	4	0	10	406	484	−78	57	68	1	4	21	
12	Moana Pasifika	14	1	0	13	354	610	−256	50	92	0	4	8	

Source: Super Rugby
(C) Champions; (RU) Runners-up;

Competition rules
Competition points breakdown:
* 4 competition points for a win
* 2 competition points for a draw
* 1 competition bonus point for a loss by seven points or less
* 1 competition bonus point for scoring at least three tries more than the opponent in a match
Tiebreaker rules:
If, at any stage, teams have the same number of competition points, the following tiebreaker rules apply (in this order) to determine their standing:
* Most wins from all matches
* Highest difference between total points for and total points against from all matches (points difference)
* Most tries scored from all matches
* Highest difference between total tries for and total tries against from all matches
* Coin toss

=== Round-by-round ===
The table below shows each team's progression throughout the season. For each round, their cumulative points total is shown with the overall log position in brackets:

Team Progression
Team	R1	R2	R3	R4	R5	R6	R7	R8	R9	R10	R11	R12	R13	R14	R15	QF	SF	Final
Blues	5 (1st)	6 (4th)	10 (3rd)	11 (4th)	15 (4th)	16 (5th)	21 (5th)	21 (5th)	26 (5th)	30 (4th)	34 (3rd)	34 (5th)	38 (4th)	42 (3rd)	46 (3rd)	Won	Lost	DNQ
Brumbies	4 (5th)	8 (3rd)	12 (2nd)	17 (2nd)	17 (3rd)	21 (3rd)	26 (3rd)	31 (2nd)	31 (2nd)	32 (2nd)	36 (2nd)	41 (2nd)	41 (3rd)	41 (4th)	46 (4th)	Won	Lost	DNQ
Chiefs	5 (3rd)	10 (1st)	15 (1st)	19 (1st)	23 (1st)	27 (1st)	27 (2nd)	31 (1st)	36 (1st)	40 (1st)	45 (1st)	46 (1st)	50 (1st)	54 (1st)	59 (1st)	Won	Won	Lost
Crusaders	0 (10th)	5 (7th)	6 (8th)	10 (5th)	15 (5th)	19 (4th)	23 (4th)	23 (4th)	28 (3rd)	28 (5th)	33 (4th)	37 (4th)	42 (2nd)	47 (2nd)	48 (2nd)	Won	Won	Won
Drua	4 (6th)	4 (8th)	8 (5th)	9 (7th)	9 (9th)	13 (7th)	13 (7th)	13 (8th)	13 (9th)	13 (11th)	17 (8th)	17 (9th)	17 (10th)	21 (10th)	26 (7th)	Lost	DNQ	DNQ
Force	4 (4th)	4 (9th)	8 (6th)	8 (8th)	8 (10th)	9 (10th)	9 (10th)	9 (11th)	13 (8th)	13 (10th)	13 (11th)	18 (8th)	22 (8th)	22 (9th)	22 (10th)	DNQ	DNQ	DNQ
Highlanders	0 (12th)	0 (12th)	0 (12th)	4 (11th)	9 (8th)	14 (6th)	14 (6th)	14 (7th)	14 (7th)	15 (8th)	15 (10th)	15 (11th)	19 (9th)	23 (8th)	24 (9th)	DNQ	DNQ	DNQ
Hurricanes	5 (2nd)	9 (2nd)	10 (4th)	14 (3rd)	19 (2nd)	23 (2nd)	27 (1st)	27 (3rd)	27 (4th)	31 (3rd)	32 (5th)	37 (3rd)	37 (5th)	37 (5th)	41 (5th)	Lost	DNQ	DNQ
Moana Pasifika	1 (7th)	1 (11th)	2 (11th)	2 (12th)	2 (12th)	2 (12th)	2 (12th)	2 (12th)	2 (12th)	2 (12th)	3 (12th)	3 (12th)	3 (12th)	4 (12th)	8 (12th)	DNQ	DNQ	DNQ
Rebels	1 (9th)	2 (10th)	6 (10th)	6 (10th)	10 (7th)	10 (9th)	10 (9th)	10 (10th)	10 (11th)	14 (9th)	15 (9th)	15 (10th)	16 (11th)	21 (11th)	21 (11th)	DNQ	DNQ	DNQ
Reds	0 (11th)	5 (6th)	6 (9th)	10 (6th)	11 (6th)	11 (8th)	11 (8th)	15 (6th)	15 (6th)	19 (6th)	19 (7th)	23 (7th)	23 (7th)	24 (7th)	24 (8th)	Lost	DNQ	DNQ
Waratahs	1 (8th)	6 (5th)	7 (7th)	7 (9th)	7 (11th)	8 (11th)	8 (11th)	13 (9th)	13 (10th)	17 (7th)	21 (6th)	26 (6th)	31 (6th)	31 (6th)	31 (6th)	Lost	DNQ	DNQ
Key:	win	draw	loss	bye	Posp.	No match												

== Matches ==
The fixtures for the 2023 Super Rugby Pacific competition were released on 25 September 2022.

Home \ Away	BLU	BRU	CHI	CRU	DRU	FOR	HIG	HUR	MOA	REB	RED	WAR
Blues	—	20–25	—	28–34	—	30–17	16–9	36–25	31–30	—	—	55–21
Brumbies	—	—	21–31	—	43–28	—	48–32	—	62–36	33–17	23–17	40–36
Chiefs	20–13	—	—	34–24	50–17	—	28–7	23–12	—	44–25	22–25	—
Crusaders	15–3	35–17	10–31	—	—	48–13	52–15	—	38–21	—	—	42–18
Drua	14–30	—	—	25–24	—	—	—	27–24	47–46	38–28	41–17	17–46
Force	—	34–19	19–43	—	34–14	—	30–17	—	21–18	34–27	20–71	—
Highlanders	20–60	—	28–52	—	57–24	43–35	—	14–29	—	20–17	35–30	—
Hurricanes	19–25	32–27	17–33	27–26	—	45–42	—	—	71–22	—	—	34–17
Moana Pasifika	—	—	29–52	7–41	34–36	—	17–45	0–59	—	33–43	28–40	—
Rebels	17–54	26–33	—	27–43	—	52–14	—	33–39	—	—	40–34	34–27
Reds	26–45	24–52	—	12–25	27–24	31–17	—	13–47	—	—	—	24–32
Waratahs	—	25–31	14–24	—	32–18	36–16	21–20	—	24–33	38–20	—	—

First match(es) will be played: 24 February 2023. Source: Super Rugby
Legend: Blue = home team win; Yellow = draw; Red = away team win.

== Finals ==
The finals fixtures are as follows:

Quarter-finals
10 June – Hamilton
Chiefs	29
Reds	20
10 June – Canberra
Brumbies	37
Hurricanes	33
9 June – Auckland
Blues	41
Waratahs	12
10 June – Christchurch
Crusaders	49
Drua	8

Semi-finals
17 June – Hamilton
Chiefs	19
Brumbies	6
16 June – Christchurch
Blues	15
Crusaders	52

Final
24 June – Hamilton
Chiefs	20
Crusaders	25

=== Quarter-finals ===
9 June 2023
19:35 (GMT +12)

Blues	41–12	Waratahs
Try: Finlay Christie 17'; Nepo Laulala 38'; Ricky Riccitelli 45'; Zarn Sullivan 53'; Mark Tele'a 67'; Con: Beauden Barrett (4/4) 19', 40', 47', 54'; Harry Plummer (1/1) 69'; Pen: Beauden Barrett (1/1) 12'; Harry Plummer (1/1) 80+1'	Report	Try: Ned Hanigan 3'; Dylan Pietsch 70'; Con: Tane Edmed (1/2) 4'

Eden Park, Auckland
Attendance: 11,383
Referee: Ben O'Keeffe (New Zealand)

10 June 2023
16:35 (GMT +12)

Chiefs	29–20	Reds
Try: Emoni Narawa 40'; Pita Gus Sowakula 76'; Con: Damian McKenzie (2/2) 40+2', 77'; Pen: Damian McKenzie (5/5) 19', 23', 31', 49', 70'	Report	Try: Suliasi Vunivalu (2) 9', 60'; Harry Wilson 35'; Con: Tom Lynagh (1/3) 61'; Pen: Tom Lynagh (1/2) 52'

FMG Stadium Waikato, Hamilton
Attendance: 15,500
Referee: Angus Gardner (Australia)

10 June 2023
19:05 (GMT +12)

Crusaders	49–8	Drua
Try: Oli Jager 2'; Codie Taylor (2) 5', 14'; Sione Havili Talitui 33'; Scott Barrett 45'; Will Jordan 66'; Willi Heinz 78'; Con: Richie Mo'unga (6/6) 3', 7', 15', 34', 46', 68'; Fergus Burke (1/1) 79'	Report	Try: Selestino Ravutaumada 35'; Con: Frank Lomani (0/1); Pen: Frank Lomani (1/1) 25'

Orangetheory Stadium, Christchurch
Referee: Brendon Pickerill (New Zealand)

10 June 2023
19:35 (GMT +10)

Brumbies	37–33	Hurricanes
Try: Ollie Sapsford 9'; Jack Debreczeni 16'; Len Ikitau 25'; Luke Reimer 64'; Tom Wright 71'; Con: Jack Debreczeni (2/4) 10', 17'; Noah Lolesio (1/1) 732'; Pen: Jack Debreczeni (2/2) 31', 38'	Report	Try: Kini Naholo 2'; Ardie Savea 48'; Devan Flanders 60'; Con: Brett Cameron (3/3) 3', 49', 61'; Pen: Brett Cameron (4/5) 14', 22', 29', 57'

GIO Stadium, Canberra
Attendance: 8,875
Referee: Nic Berry (Australia)

=== Semi-finals ===
16 June 2023
19:05 (GMT +12)

Crusaders	52–15	Blues
Try: Braydon Ennor 3'; Leicester Fainga'anuku (2) 12', 48'; Will Jordan 35'; Codie Taylor 40'; Fergus Burke 71'; Con: Richie Mo'unga (5/6) 4', 36', 40+1', 50', 73'; Pen: Richie Mo'unga (4/4) 9', 21', 66', 78'	Report	Try: Beauden Barrett 58'; Caleb Clarke 80+3'; Con: Beauden Barrett (1/2) 80+4'; Pen: Beauden Barrett (1/1) 25'; Cards: Hoskins Sotutu (yellow card) 38' to 48'

Orangetheory Stadium, Christchurch
Attendance: 15,000
Referee: Angus Gardner (Australia)

17 June 2023
19:05 (GMT +12)

Chiefs	19–6	Brumbies
Try: Brodie Retallick 78'; Con: Damian McKenzie (1/1) 79'; Pen: Damian McKenzie (4/4) 8', 32', 54', 72'	Report	Pen: Jack Debreczeni (0/1); Noah Lolesio (2/2) 34', 58'

FMG Stadium Waikato, Hamilton
Attendance: 18,500
Referee: Nic Berry (Australia)

=== Final ===
24 June 2023
19:05 (GMT +12)

Chiefs	20–25	Crusaders
Try: Shaun Stevenson 23'; Emoni Narawa 43'; Con: Damian McKenzie (2/2) 24', 44'; Pen: Damian McKenzie (2/4) 20', 49'; Cards: Anton Lienert-Brown (yellow card) 9' to 19'; Luke Jacobson (yellow card) 26' to 36'; Sam Cane (yellow card) 72' to 80'	Report	Try: Codie Taylor (2) 28', 73'; Richie Mo'unga 36'; Con: Richie Mo'unga (2/3) 37', 74'; Pen: Richie Mo'unga (2/2) 9', 80+1'; Chay Fihaki (0/1)

FMG Stadium Waikato, Hamilton
Attendance: 25,000
Referee: Ben O'Keeffe (New Zealand)

== Statistics ==
As of 24 June 2023

=== Leading point scorers ===
No.	Player	Team	Points	Average	Details
1	(New Zealand) Damian McKenzie	(New Zealand) Chiefs	191	11.94	3 T, 43 C, 30 P, 0 D
2	(New Zealand) Richie Mo'unga	(New Zealand) Crusaders	174	11.60	3 T, 57 C, 14 P, 1 D
3	(New Zealand) Sam Gilbert	(New Zealand) Highlanders	122	10.17	4 T, 33 C, 12 P, 0 D
4	(Australia) Reece Hodge	(Australia) Rebels	119	9.15	2 T, 38 C, 11 P, 0 D
5	(New Zealand) Jordie Barrett	(New Zealand) Hurricanes	118	9.08	2 T, 36 C, 12 P, 0 D
6	(New Zealand) Beauden Barrett	(New Zealand) Blues	115	9.58	3 T, 32 C, 12 P, 0 D
7	(Australia) Noah Lolesio	(Australia) Brumbies	97	6.47	2 T, 30 C, 9 P, 0 D
8	(Australia) Ben Donaldson	(Australia) Waratahs	81	5.40	1 T, 26 C, 8 P, 0 D
9	(Australia) Christian Lealiifano	(New Zealand) Moana Pasifika	70	7.78	3 T, 20 C, 5 P, 0 D
10	(New Zealand) Leicester Fainga'anuku	(New Zealand) Crusaders	65	5.00	13 T, 0 C, 0 P, 0 D

Source: Points

=== Leading try scorers ===
No.	Player	Team	Tries	Average
1	(New Zealand) Leicester Fainga'anuku	(New Zealand) Crusaders	13	1.00
2	(New Zealand) Shaun Stevenson	(New Zealand) Chiefs	12	0.71
2	(New Zealand) Codie Taylor	(New Zealand) Crusaders	12	0.86
2	(New Zealand) Mark Tele'a	(New Zealand) Blues	12	0.92
5	(Fiji) Iosefo Masi	(Fiji) Drua	9	0.64
5	(Fiji) Kini Naholo	(New Zealand) Hurricanes	9	0.90
5	(New Zealand) Cam Roigard	(New Zealand) Hurricanes	9	0.64
5	(Australia) Corey Toole	(Australia) Brumbies	9	0.64
9	(England) Zach Kibirige	(Australia) Force	8	0.73
9	(Fiji) Emoni Narawa	(New Zealand) Chiefs	8	0.62
9	(Australia) Mark Nawaqanitawase	(Australia) Waratahs	8	0.57
9	(New Zealand) Ardie Savea	(New Zealand) Hurricanes	8	0.67

Source: Tries

=== Discipline ===
Player	Team	Red	Yellow	Round (vs. Opponent)
(New Zealand) Isaia Walker-Leawere	(New Zealand) Hurricanes	1	2	Round 11 (vs. Drua); Round 3 (vs. Blues); Round 11 (vs. Drua)
(Australia) Ollie Callan	(Australia) Force	1	1	Round 2 (vs. Reds); Round 3 (vs. Moana Pasifika)
(Australia) Siosifa Amone	(Australia) Force	1	0	Round 3 (vs. Moana Pasifika)
(Australia) Angus Blyth	(Australia) Reds	1	0	Round 7 (vs. Brumbies)
(New Zealand) Tevita Mafileo	(New Zealand) Hurricanes	1	0	Round 2 (vs. Rebels)
(New Zealand) Mike McKee	(New Zealand) Moana Pasifika	1	0	Round 3 (vs. Force)
(New Zealand) Dalton Papalii	(New Zealand) Blues	1	0	Round 12 (vs. Crusaders)
(New Zealand) Sam Cane	(New Zealand) Chiefs	0	3	Round 1 (vs. Crusaders); Round 3 (vs. Highlanders); Final (vs. Crusaders)
(New Zealand) Pari Pari Parkinson	(New Zealand) Highlanders	0	3	Round 2 (vs. Crusaders); Round 9 (vs. Force); Round 10 (vs. Waratahs)
(Samoa) Michael Curry	(New Zealand) Moana Pasifika	0	2	Round 7 (vs. Crusaders); Round 11 (vs. Blues)
(New Zealand) Bryn Gatland	(New Zealand) Chiefs	0	2	Round 2 (vs. Moana Pasifika); Round 8 (vs. Hurricanes)
(New Zealand) Luke Jacobson	(New Zealand) Chiefs	0	2	Round 10 (vs. Crusaders); Final (vs. Crusaders)
(Australia) Jackson Pugh	(Australia) Force	0	2	Round 2 (vs. Reds); Round 8 (vs. Waratahs)
(New Zealand) Cameron Suafoa	(New Zealand) Blues	0	2	Round 1 (vs. Highlanders); Round 3 (vs. Hurricanes)
(Australia) Darcy Swain	(Australia) Brumbies	0	2	Round 8 (vs. Drua); Round 11 (vs. Rebels)
(Fiji) Timoci Tavatavanawai	(New Zealand) Moana Pasifika	0	2	Round 4 (vs. Brumbies); Round 6 (vs. Highlanders)
(Australia) Jordan Uelese	(Australia) Rebels	0	2	Round 10 (vs. Moana Pasifika); Round 13 (vs. Highlanders)
(Australia) Seru Uru	(Australia) Reds	0	2	Round 1 (vs. Hurricanes); Round 4 (vs. Drua)
(Australia) Brad Wilkin	(Australia) Rebels	0	2	Round 2 (vs. Hurricanes); Round 12 (vs. Waratahs)
(New Zealand) Naitoa Ah Kuoi	(New Zealand) Chiefs	0	1	Round 8 (vs. Hurricanes)
(New Zealand) Jermaine Ainsley	(New Zealand) Highlanders	0	1	Round 15 (vs. Blues)
(Australia) Allan Alaalatoa	(Australia) Brumbies	0	1	Round 14 (vs. Chiefs)
(Australia) Lachie Anderson	(Australia) Rebels	0	1	Round 1 (vs. Force)
(New Zealand) Suetena Asomua	(New Zealand) Moana Pasifika	0	1	Round 3 (vs. Force)
(New Zealand) Ethan Blackadder	(New Zealand) Crusaders	0	1	Round 1 (vs. Chiefs)
(Australia) Daniel Botha	(Australia) Waratahs	0	1	Round 6 (vs. Brumbies)
(Fiji) Elia Canakaivata	(Fiji) Drua	0	1	Round 5 (vs. Highlanders)
(Australia) Josh Canham	(Australia) Rebels	0	1	Round 12 (vs. Waratahs)
(New Zealand) Caleb Clarke	(New Zealand) Blues	0	1	Round 2 (vs. Brumbies)
(Australia) Jack Debreczeni	(Australia) Brumbies	0	1	Round 13 (vs. Force)
(New Zealand) Vaiolini Ekuasi	(Australia) Rebels	0	1	Round 9 (vs. Crusaders)
(South Africa) Cabous Eloff	(Australia) Rebels	0	1	Round 7 (vs. Blues)
(Samoa) Miracle Faiʻilagi	(New Zealand) Moana Pasifika	0	1	Round 10 (vs. Rebels)
(New Zealand) Leicester Fainga'anuku	(New Zealand) Crusaders	0	1	Round 14 (vs. Waratahs)
(Australia) Lalakai Foketi	(Australia) Waratahs	0	1	Round 10 (vs. Highlanders)
(New Zealand) Shannon Frizell	(New Zealand) Highlanders	0	1	Round 3 (vs. Chiefs)
(Tonga) Solomone Funaki	(New Zealand) Moana Pasifika	0	1	Round 11 (vs. Blues)
(New Zealand) Connor Garden-Bachop	(New Zealand) Highlanders	0	1	Round 5 (vs. Drua)
(New Zealand) Ethan de Groot	(New Zealand) Highlanders	0	1	Round 9 (vs. Force)
(Australia) Will Harris	(Australia) Waratahs	0	1	Round 8 (vs. Force)
(Fiji) Haereiti Hetet	(Fiji) Drua	0	1	Round 9 (vs. Chiefs)
(Australia) Reece Hodge	(Australia) Rebels	0	1	Round 15 (vs. Brumbies)
(Australia) Michael Hooper	(Australia) Waratahs	0	1	Round 6 (vs. Brumbies)
(Australia) Tom Horton	(Australia) Force	0	1	Round 9 (vs. Highlanders)
(New Zealand) Mitch Hunt	(New Zealand) Highlanders	0	1	Round 4 (vs. Force)
(New Zealand) Brayden Iose	(New Zealand) Hurricanes	0	1	Round 15 (vs. Crusaders)
(Australia) Harry Johnson-Holmes	(Australia) Waratahs	0	1	Round 6 (vs. Brumbies)
(New Zealand) Corey Kellow	(New Zealand) Crusaders	0	1	Round 7 (vs. Moana Pasifika)
(New Zealand) Du'Plessis Kirifi	(New Zealand) Hurricanes	0	1	Round 1 (vs. Reds)
(Samoa) James Lay	(New Zealand) Blues	0	1	Round 2 (vs. Brumbies)
(Samoa) Jordan Lay	(New Zealand) Blues	0	1	Round 4 (vs. Crusaders)
(New Zealand) Anton Lienert-Brown	(New Zealand) Chiefs	0	1	Final (vs. Crusaders)
(Samoa) Ezekiel Lindenmuth	(New Zealand) Moana Pasifika	0	1	Round 10 (vs. Rebels)
(Australia) Fraser McReight	(Australia) Reds	0	1	Round 15 (vs. Drua)
(Argentina) Santiago Medrano	(Australia) Force	0	1	Round 3 (vs. Moana Pasifika)
(New Zealand) Marino Mikaele-Tu'u	(New Zealand) Highlanders	0	1	Round 9 (vs. Force)
(Australia) Andy Muirhead	(Australia) Brumbies	0	1	Round 8 (vs. Drua)
(New Zealand) Etene Nanai-Seturo	(New Zealand) Chiefs	0	1	Round 9 (vs. Drua)
(New Zealand) Ollie Norris	(New Zealand) Chiefs	0	1	Round 11 (vs. Highlanders)
(Australia) George Poolman	(Australia) Force	0	1	Round 4 (vs. Highlanders)
(New Zealand) Cortez Ratima	(New Zealand) Chiefs	0	1	Round 2 (vs. Moana Pasifika)
(Australia) Luke Reimer	(Australia) Brumbies	0	1	Round 12 (vs. Highlanders)
(New Zealand) Marcel Renata	(New Zealand) Blues	0	1	Round 11 (vs. Moana Pasifika)
(Fiji) Kitione Salawa Jr.	(Fiji) Drua	0	1	Round 4 (vs. Reds)
(New Zealand) Ardie Savea	(New Zealand) Hurricanes	0	1	Round 2 (vs. Rebels)
(Samoa) Sam Slade	(New Zealand) Moana Pasifika	0	1	Round 1 (vs. Drua)
(Australia) Ryan Smith	(Australia) Reds	0	1	Round 1 (vs. Hurricanes)
(New Zealand) Hoskins Sotutu	(New Zealand) Blues	0	1	Semifinal (vs. Crusaders)
(Australia) Hamish Stewart	(Australia) Force	0	1	Round 9 (vs. Highlanders)
(New Zealand) Kershawl Sykes-Martin	(New Zealand) Crusaders	0	1	Round 4 (vs. Blues)
(Fiji) Joseva Tamani	(Fiji) Drua	0	1	Round 8 (vs. Brumbies)
(New Zealand) Codie Taylor	(New Zealand) Crusaders	0	1	Round 15 (vs. Hurricanes)
(New Zealand) Mark Tele'a	(New Zealand) Blues	0	1	Round 7 (vs. Rebels)
(Samoa) Chase Tiatia	(Australia) Force	0	1	Round 6 (vs. Hurricanes)
(Fiji) Jone Tiko	(Fiji) Drua	0	1	Round 2 (vs. Waratahs)
(Fiji) Zuriel Togiatama	(Fiji) Drua	0	1	Round 2 (vs. Waratahs)
(Fiji) Emosi Tuqiri	(Fiji) Drua	0	1	Round 14 (vs. Moana Pasifika)
(New Zealand) James Tucker	(New Zealand) Blues	0	1	Round 13 (vs. Reds)
(New Zealand) Roger Tuivasa-Sheck	(New Zealand) Blues	0	1	Round 1 (vs. Highlanders)
(Tonga) Isi Tuʻungafasi	(New Zealand) Moana Pasifika	0	1	Round 10 (vs. Rebels)
(Australia) Mahe Vailanu	(Australia) Waratahs	0	1	Round 9 (vs. Blues)
(Fiji) Apisalome Vota	(Fiji) Drua	0	1	Round 9 (vs. Chiefs)
(Australia) Joey Walton	(Australia) Waratahs	0	1	Round 14 (vs. Crusaders)
(New Zealand) Brad Weber	(New Zealand) Chiefs	0	1	Round 2 (vs. Moana Pasifika)
(Australia) Harry Wilson	(Australia) Reds	0	1	Round 2 (vs. Force)
(Australia) Tom Wright	(Australia) Brumbies	0	1	Round 7 (vs. Reds)

== Players ==
=== Squads ===
The following squads have been named. Players listed in italics denote non-original squad members:

Blues squad
Forwards	Adrian Choat • Sam Darry • Kurt Eklund • Josh Fusitua • Alex Hodgman • Akira Ioane • Nepo Laulala • James Lay • Jordan Lay • Dalton Papalii • Taine Plumtree • Marcel Renata • Ricky Riccitelli • Tom Robinson • Rob Rush • Anton Segner • Hoskins Sotutu • Cameron Suafoa • James Tucker • Patrick Tuipulotu • Ofa Tuʻungafasi • Soane Vikena
Backs	Beauden Barrett • Finlay Christie • Caleb Clarke • Corey Evans • Taufa Funaki • Bryce Heem • Rieko Ioane • AJ Lam • Sam Nock • Stephen Perofeta • Harry Plummer • Jacob Ratumaitavuki-Kneepkens • Zarn Sullivan • Caleb Tangitau • Mark Tele'a • Tanielu Teleʻa • Roger Tuivasa-Sheck
Coach	Leon MacDonald

Brumbies squad
Forwards	Allan Alaalatoa • Jahrome Brown • Charlie Cale • Nick Frost • Tom Hooper • Fred Kaihea • Sefo Kautai • Ed Kennedy • Lachlan Lonergan • Connal McInerney • Cadeyrn Neville • Billy Pollard • Luke Reimer • Tom Ross • Pete Samu • Blake Schoupp • Rory Scott • James Slipper • Darcy Swain • Sam Thomson • John Ulugia • Rob Valetini • Rhys van Nek • Harry Vella • Jack Wright
Backs	Nathan Carroll • Hudson Creighton • Jack Debreczeni • Chris Feauai-Sautia • Len Ikitau • Noah Lolesio • Ryan Lonergan • Declan Meredith • Jesse Mogg • Andy Muirhead • Ben O'Donnell • Pedro Rolando • Ollie Sapsford • Klayton Thorn • Corey Toole • Tamati Tua • Nic White • Tom Wright
Coach	Stephen Larkham

Chiefs squad
Forwards	Naitoa Ah Kuoi • Kaylum Boshier • Sam Cane • George Dyer • Samipeni Finau • Luke Jacobson • Josh Lord • Laghlan McWhannell • Atu Moli • Ollie Norris • Simon Parker • Jared Proffit • Brodie Retallick • Aidan Ross • John Ryan • Manaaki Selby-Rickit • Bradley Slater • Pita Gus Sowakula • Angus Taʻavao • Samisoni Taukei'aho • Tyrone Thompson • Solomone Tukuafu • Tupou Vaa'i
Backs	Solomon Alaimalo • Liam Coombes-Fabling • Bryn Gatland • Josh Ioane • Lalomilo Lalomilo • Anton Lienert-Brown • Peniasi Malimali • Damian McKenzie • Etene Nanai-Seturo • Alex Nankivell • Emoni Narawa • Rameka Poihipi • Ngane Punivai • Cortez Ratima • Rivez Reihana • Xavier Roe • Daniel Rona • Shaun Stevenson • Te Toiroa Tahuriorangi • Quinn Tupaea • Brad Weber • Gideon Wrampling
Coach	Clayton McMillan

Crusaders squad
Forwards	John Afoa • Scott Barrett • George Bell • Ethan Blackadder • George Bower • Finlay Brewis • Seb Calder • Tom Christie • Mitchell Dunshea • Zach Gallagher • Dominic Gardiner • Cullen Grace • Jamie Hannah • Sione Havili Talitui • Oli Jager • Corey Kellow • Christian Lio-Willie • Quentin MacDonald • Brodie McAlister • Ioane Moananu • Joe Moody • Fletcher Newell • Reuben O'Neill • Quinten Strange • Kershawl Sykes-Martin • Codie Taylor • Andrew Turner • Sam Whitelock • Tamaiti Williams
Backs	Fergus Burke • Louie Chapman • Mitchell Drummond • Braydon Ennor • Leicester Fainga'anuku • Chay Fihaki • Will Gualter • Jack Goodhue • David Havili • Willi Heinz • Noah Hotham • Will Jordan • Taha Kemara • Joel Lam • Dallas McLeod • Richie Mo'unga • Melani Nanai • Pepesana Patafilo • Sevu Reece • Macca Springer
Coach	Scott Robertson

Drua squad
Forwards	Elia Canakaivata • Te Ahiwaru Cirikidaveta • Meli Derenalagi • Mesake Doge • Mesu Dolokoto • Haereiti Hetet • Tevita Ikanivere • Jone Koroiduadua • Joji Kunavula • Naibuka Matadigo • Chris Minimbi • Vilive Miramira • Raikabula Momoedonu • Motikai Murray • Jone Naqiri • Isoa Nasilasila • Rusiate Nasove • Livai Natave • Fred Ralulu • Ratu Leone Rotuisolia • Kitione Salawa Jr. • Timoci Sauvoli • Joseva Tamani • Samu Tawake • Jone Tiko • Zuriel Togiatama • Sorovakatini Tuifagalele • Meli Tuni • Emosi Tuqiri • Kaliopasi Uluilakepa • Sailosi Vakalokalo • Etonia Waqa
Backs	Philip Baselala • Ilaisa Droasese • Simione Kuruvoli • Frank Lomani • Iosefo Masi • Ratu Peni Matawalu • Caleb Muntz • Michael Naitokani • Kalione Nasoko • Isikeli Rabitu • Taniela Rakuro • Kalaveti Ravouvou • Selestino Ravutaumada • Tuidraki Samusamuvodre • Eroni Sau • Kitione Taliga • Teti Tela • Aisea Tuisese • Kemu Valetini • Jack Volavola • Apisalome Vota
Coach	Mick Byrne

Force squad
Forwards	Bo Abra • Siosifa Amone • Tim Anstee • Ollie Callan • Folau Fainga'a • Charlie Hancock • Tom Horton • Feleti Kaitu'u • Felix Kalapu • Kane Koteka • Ryan McCauley • Santiago Medrano • Isi Naisarani • Jacob Norris • Marley Pearce • Jackson Pugh • Wilton Rebolo • Tom Robertson • Izack Rodda • Andrew Romano • Will Sankey • Ned Slack-Smith • Jeremy Thrush • Carlo Tizzano • Angus Wagner • Rahboni Warren-Vosayaco • Michael Wells • Jeremy Williams • Jack Winchester
Backs	Daniel Ala • Max Burey • Oliver Cummins • Issak Fines-Leleiwasa • Nikolai Foliaki • Bryce Hegarty • Zach Kibirige • Bayley Kuenzle • Grason Makara • Manasa Mataele • Rupeni Mataele • Reesjan Pasitoa • George Poolman • Ian Prior • Toni Pulu • Henry Robertson • Gareth Simpson • Sam Spink • Hamish Stewart • Jake Strachan • Reece Tapine • Chase Tiatia
Coach	Simon Cron

Highlanders squad
Forwards	Jermaine Ainsley • Leni Apisai • Josh Bekhuis • Nikora Broughton • Ethan de Groot • Josh Dickson • Shannon Frizell • Oliver Haig • Billy Harmon • Max Hicks • Fabian Holland • Luca Inch • Ayden Johnstone • James Lentjes • Daniel Lienert-Brown • Andrew Makalio • Rhys Marshall • Saula Ma'u • Marino Mikaele-Tu'u • Pari Pari Parkinson • Hugh Renton • PJ Sheck • Jack Taylor • Jeff Thwaites • Will Tucker • Sean Withy
Backs	James Arscott • Marty Banks • Martín Bogado • Freddie Burns • Mosese Dawai • Folau Fakatava • Connor Garden-Bachop • Sam Gilbert • Scott Gregory • Nathan Hastie • Kemara Hauiti-Parapara • Mitch Hunt • Finn Hurley • Vilimoni Koroi • Jonah Lowe • Cam Millar • Jona Nareki • Fetuli Paea • Aaron Smith • Te Toiroa Tahuriorangi • Jake Te Hiwi • Josh Timu • Thomas Umaga-Jensen • Matt Whaanga
Coach	Clarke Dermody

Hurricanes squad
Forwards	Asafo Aumua • Dominic Bird • James Blackwell • Dane Coles • Caleb Delany • Jacob Devery • Hame Faiva • Devan Flanders • Owen Franks • TK Howden • Brayden Iose • Du'Plessis Kirifi • Peter Lakai • Tyler Laubscher • Tyrel Lomax • Tevita Mafileo • Xavier Numia • Hugo Plummer • Reed Prinsep • Pouri Rakete-Stones • Justin Sangster • Ardie Savea • Pasilio Tosi • Isaia Walker-Leawere
Backs	Jordie Barrett • Jamie Booth • Brett Cameron • Harry Godfrey • Logan Henry • Riley Higgins • Riley Hohepa • Ruben Love • Josh Moorby • Aidan Morgan • Kini Naholo • TJ Perenara • Billy Proctor • Salesi Rayasi • Cam Roigard • Julian Savea • Daniel Sinkinson • Bailyn Sullivan • Peter Umaga-Jensen
Coach	Jason Holland

Moana Pasifika squad
Forwards	Joe Apikotoa • Chris Apoua • Suetena Asomua • Michael Curry • Miracle Faiʻilagi • Penitoa Finau • Solomone Funaki • Lotu Inisi • Niko Jones • Sekope Kepu • Tau Koloamatangi • Jack Lam • Potu Leavasa Jr. • Ezekiel Lindenmuth • Jonah Mau'u • Mike McKee • Alex McRobbie • Sam Moli • Alamanda Motuga • Mahonri Ngakuru • Ray Niuia • Abraham Pole • Joe Royal • Sam Slade • Luteru Tolai • Sione Tuipulotu • Isi Tuʻungafasi
Backs	Tomasi Alosio • Levi Aumua • Ere Enari • Tima Fainga'anuku • Neria Fomai • William Havili • Fine Inisi • Christian Lealiifano • D'Angelo Leuila • Lincoln McClutchie • Manu Paea • Henry Taefu • Jonathan Taumateine • Timoci Tavatavanawai • Danny Toala • Anzelo Tuitavuki • Lolagi Visinia • Sam Wye
Coach	Aaron Mauger

Rebels squad
Forwards	Isaac Aedo Kailea • Josh Canham • Tim Cardall • Jaiden Christian • Vaiolini Ekuasi • Cabous Eloff • Pone Fa'amausili • Theo Fourie • Matt Gibbon • Richard Hardwick • Zac Hough • Trevor Hosea • Tamati Ioane • Josh Kemeny • Rob Leota • Alex Mafi • Daniel Maiava • Cameron Orr • Matt Philip • Anaru Rangi • Angelo Smith • Sam Talakai • Tuaina Taii Tualima • Jordan Uelese • Brad Wilkin
Backs	Lachie Anderson • David Feliuai • Carter Gordon • Mason Gordon • Reece Hodge • Stacey Ili • Monty Ioane • Nick Jooste • Andrew Kellaway • Ryan Louwrens • Lebron Naea • Ray Nu'u • Joe Pincus • Lukas Ripley • Moses Sorovi • James Tuttle • David Vaihu • Glen Vaihu • Ilikena Vudogo
Coach	Kevin Foote

Reds squad
Forwards	Connor Anderson • Richie Asiata • George Blake • Angus Blyth • Wilson Blyth • Sef Fa'agase • Matt Faessler • Lopeti Faifua • Harry Hoopert • Luke Jones • Fraser McReight • Josh Nasser • Zane Nonggorr • Peni Ravai • Ryan Smith • Phransis Sula-Siaosi • Keynan Tauakipulu • Taniela Tupou • Jake Upfield • Seru Uru • Connor Vest • Harry Wilson • Liam Wright • Dane Zander
Backs	Taj Annan • Floyd Aubrey • Jock Campbell • Lawson Creighton • Filipo Daugunu • Josh Flook • Mac Grealy • Isaac Henry • Paddy James • Spencer Jeans • Tom Lynagh • Tate McDermott • James O'Connor • Hunter Paisami • Jordan Petaia • Kalani Thomas • Suliasi Vunivalu • Louis Werchon
Coach	Brad Thorn

Waratahs squad
Forwards	Angus Bell • Daniel Botha • Tetera Faulkner • Charlie Gamble • Langi Gleeson • Ned Hanigan • Will Harris • Jed Holloway • Archer Holz • Michael Hooper • Michael Icely • Harry Johnson-Holmes • Tom Lambert • Sateki Latu • Tolu Latu • Nephi Leatigaga • Zane Marolt • Dave Porecki • Taleni Seu • Hugh Sinclair • Lachlan Swinton • Tiaan Tauakipulu • Ola Tauelangi • Mahe Vailanu • Zac Von Appen • Hunter Ward
Backs	Kurtley Beale • Jack Bowen • Ben Donaldson • Ben Dowling • Tane Edmed • Lalakai Foketi • Harrison Goddard • Jake Gordon • Will Harrison • Max Jorgensen • Nemani Nadolo • Mark Nawaqanitawase • Izaia Perese • Dylan Pietsch • Mosese Tuipulotu • Joey Walton • Harry Wilson • Teddy Wilson
Coach	Darren Coleman

== Referees ==
The following referees were selected to officiate the 2023 Super Rugby Pacific season:

2023 Super Rugby Pacific referees
Australia	Nic Berry • Graham Cooper • Angus Gardner • Reuben Keane • Damon Murphy • Jordan Way
New Zealand	James Doleman • Angus Mabey • Ben O'Keeffe • Brendon Pickerill • Dan Waenga • Paul Williams
