= Faifua =

Faifua is a surname. Notable people with the surname include:

- Jetaya Faifua (born 2003), Australian rugby player
- Lopeti Faifua (born 2002), Australian rugby player
