= Sateki =

Sateki is a masculine given name. Notable people with the name include:

- Sateki Latu (born 1999), Australian rugby union player
- Sateki Tuipulotu (born 1971), Tongan rugby union player
