= Siaosi =

Siaosi is a name. Notable people with the name include:

- Siaosi ʻAlokuoʻulu Wycliffe Fusituʻa (1927–2014), Tongan politician
- Siaosi Leuo (born 1992), Samoan weightlifter
- Siaosi Mahoni (born 1997), American rugby union player
- Siaosi Mariner (born 1997), American football player
- Siaosi Pōhiva, Tongan politician
- Siaosi Sovaleni (born 1970), Tongan politician
- Siaosi Taimani ʻAho (died 2018), Tongan diplomat
- Siaosi Tuʻipelehake, Tongan politician
- Siaosi Tukuʻaho, Tongan politician
- Siaosi Vaili (born 1977), Samoan rugby union player
- Phransis Sula-Siaosi (born 2000), Australian rugby union player
- Tofa Siaosi (died 1981), Western Samoan politician
- Mauʻu Siaosi Puʻepuʻemai (born c. 1972), Samoan politician
