= Michael Scott (rugby union, born 1997) =

Scottish rugby union player

- Born: 23 September 1997 (age 29) Scotland
- Height: 183 cm (6 ft 0 in)
- Weight: 128 kg (282 lb)

Rugby union career
- Position: Prop
Senior career
Years	Team	Apps	(Points)
2024	Waratahs	1	(0)
- Correct as of 11 December 2024

Michael Scott (born 23 September 1997) is a Scottish rugby union player, who played for the Waratahs in Super Rugby. His preferred position is prop.

== Early career ==
Scott is from Scotland and originally came through the Glasgow Warriors academy. He represented Ayrshire Bulls in the Super6 competition between 2021 and 2023. He moved to Australia in 2023 and joined Northern Suburbs where he was named in the team of the season for 2023.

== Professional career ==
Having not played professionally in Scotland, Scott was called into the Waratahs squad as an injury replacement ahead of Round 14 of the 2024 Super Rugby Pacific season, making his debut in the same fixture against Moana Pasifika.
