= Felix Kalapu =

New Zealand rugby union player

- Full name: Felix Samuel Kalapu
- Born: 27 September 1999 (age 27) Auckland, New Zealand
- Height: 194 cm (6 ft 4 in)
- Weight: 111 kg (17 st 7 lb)
- School: Auckland Grammar School

Rugby union career
- Position: Lock / Flanker
- Current team: Ricoh Black Rams
Senior career
| Years | Team | Apps | (Points) |
| 2021–2022 | Auckland | 1 | (0) |
| 2022 | Old Glory DC | 8 | (5) |
| 2022-2025 | North Harbour | 25 | (15) |
| 2023-2024 | Force | 14 | (5) |
| 2025 | Waratahs | 6 | (5) |
| 2025– | Ricoh Black Rams | 12 | (0) |
- Correct as of 4 October 2025

Felix Kalapu (born 27 September 1999) is a New Zealand rugby union player who plays for the Force in Super Rugby. His playing position is lock or flanker. He was named in the Force squad for the 2023 Super Rugby Pacific season. He was also named in the North Harbour squad for the 2022 Bunnings NPC.

Kalapu was born in Auckland, and attended Auckland Grammar School. He played for Auckland from 2021 to 2022, before joining North Harbour in 2022. After featuring for Moana Pasifika during the 2022 pre-season, he joined Old Glory DC for the 2022 Major League Rugby season. He signed for the Force in August 2022 on a three-year deal.
