= Harry Wilson (rugby union, born 2000) =

Australian rugby union player

- Born: 17 August 2000 (age 26) Australia
- Height: 190 cm (6 ft 3 in)
- Weight: 97 kg (214 lb; 15 st 4 lb)

Rugby union career
- Position: Wing / Fullback / Centre
- Current team: Waratahs
Senior career
Years	Team	Apps	(Points)
2023–2024	Waratahs	13	(5)
2025	Dragons	12	(5)
- Correct as of 3 June 2025

Harry Wilson (born 17 August 2000) is an Australian rugby union player, who plays for the Waratahs. His preferred position is centre, wing or fullback.

== Early career ==
Wilson attended St Augustine's College, Sydney and studied at Sydney University. He plays his club rugby for Eastwood. He is the son of David Wilson and brother to Waratahs teammate Teddy Wilson.

== Professional career ==
Wilson was named in the Waratahs squad for the 2023 Super Rugby Pacific season. He made his debut in Round 5 of the season against the Chiefs, before making a further 7 appearances in the season. He was named in the Waratahs squad for the 2024 Super Rugby Pacific season.

Wilson signed for Welsh wide Dragons RFC for the start of the 2024-25 season, however was released by mutual consent one year later after making 12 appearances.
