= Marley Pearce =

Australian rugby union player

- Born: 3 August 2003 (age 23) Perth, Western Australia, Australia
- Height: 1.86 m (6 ft 1 in)
- Weight: 116 kg (256 lb; 18 st 4 lb)
- School: Aranmore Catholic College

Rugby union career
- Position: Prop
- Current team: Western Force, Otago
Senior career
Years	Team	Apps	(Points)
2023–	Western Force	33	(10)
2026	Otago	0	(0)
- Correct as of 16 July 2026
International career
Years	Team	Apps	(Points)
2023	Australia U20	3	(5)
2025	First Nations & Pasifika XV	1	(0)
- Correct as of 1 January 2025

Marley Pearce (born 3 August 2003) is an Australian professional rugby union player who plays as a prop for the Western Force in Super Rugby and for Otago in New Zealand's domestic National Provincial Championship competition.

== Early life ==
Pearce was born on 3 August 2003 in Perth, Western Australia to parents Michael and Jodal Pearce. He was actively involved in rugby union while growing up and attended Aranmore Catholic College.

== Club career ==
Pearce started his professional career with the Western Force, making his Super Rugby debut against the Blues during the 2023 season at Eden Park in Auckland. In August 2023, he signed a contract extension with the team, securing his place until the 2025 season.

== International career ==
Pearce was chosen to represent Australia at the 2023 World Rugby Under 20 Championship, making his first international appearance against Fiji.

== Personal life ==
Pearce is of Māori and First Nations heritage.
