= Jack Wright (rugby union, born 1999) =

Australian rugby union player

- Born: 7 August 1999 (age 27) Australia
- Height: 206 cm (6 ft 9 in)
- Weight: 121 kg (267 lb; 19 st 1 lb)

Rugby union career
- Position: Lock
Senior career
Years	Team	Apps	(Points)
2023	ACT Brumbies	4	(0)
2023–2026	Shizuoka Blue Revs	16	(5)
- Correct as of 14 August 2023

Jack Wright (born 7 August 1999) is an Australian rugby union player, who plays for Shizuoka Blue Revs. His preferred position is lock.

== Early career ==
Wright is from the ACT region, and represents Tuggeranong Vikings in the John I Dent Cup.

== Professional career ==
Wright was called into the Brumbies squad ahead of Round 4 of the 2023 Super Rugby Pacific season. He made his debut in the same fixture. He signed for Shizuoka Blue Revs ahead of the 2024 Japan Rugby League One season.
