= David Feliuai =

Samoan rugby union player

- Full name: David Falesa Feliuai Lene
- Born: 16 May 1997 (age 29) Auckland, New Zealand
- Height: 185 cm (6 ft 1 in)
- Weight: 95 kg (209 lb; 14 st 13 lb)

Rugby union career
- Position: Centre / Wing
- Current team: ACT Brumbies
Senior career
Years	Team	Apps	(Points)
2019–2021	Baia Mare		
2023–2024	Melbourne Rebels	19	(10)
2025–	ACT Brumbies	12	
- Correct as of 14 June 2025
International career
Years	Team	Apps	(Points)
2025	First Nations & Pasifika XV	1	(0)

David Feliuai is an Australian rugby union player, currently playing for the ACT Brumbies. His preferred position is centre or wing.

== Early career ==
Of Samoan descent, Feliuai grew up in Brisbane and represented Sunnybank. In 2018, he took part in an NFL International Combine on the Gold Coast.

== Professional career ==
Feliuai first professional appearance came in the 2019 Global Rapid Rugby season when he represented Kafiga Samoa. In July 2019, he moved to Romania, signing for Baia Mare on a five-year deal. He was named as Baia Mare's third-best player of the 2021 season, before returning to Australia early at the end of 2021. He was named in the Rebels squad ahead of the 2023 Super Rugby Pacific season, before making his debut in Round 3 against the Waratahs. He scored his first try for the Rebels in Round 4 against the Chiefs.

== Super Rugby statistics ==
As of 3 June 2023

Season	Team	Games	Starts	Sub	Mins	Tries	Cons	Pens	Drops	Points	Yel	Red
2023	Rebels	7	3	4	231	2	0	0	0	10	0	0
Total		7	3	4	231	2	0	0	0	10	0	0
