= Daniel Maiava =

Australian rugby union player

- Born: Daniel Maiava Melbourne, Australia
- Height: 195 cm (6 ft 5 in)
- Weight: 115 kg (254 lb)

Rugby union career
- Position(s): Lock, Flanker, Number 8
- Current team: Shizuoka Blue Revs
Senior career
Years	Team	Apps	(Points)
2022–2024	Rebels	11	(0)
2024	Southland	4	(0)
2025-	Shizuoka Blue Revs	11	(20)
- Correct as of 12 September 2025

Daniel Maiava is an Australian rugby union player who plays for the Rebels in Super Rugby. His playing position is lock. He was named in the Rebels squad for the Round 6 match of the 2022 Super Rugby Pacific season, making his debut in the same match. He was previously a member of the Rebels academy promoted to this first team squad.

== Super Rugby statistics ==
As of 3 June 2023

Season	Team	Games	Starts	Sub	Mins	Tries	Cons	Pens	Drops	Points	Yel	Red
2022	Rebels	2	0	2	26	0	0	0	0	0	0	0
2023	Rebels	3	0	3	36	0	0	0	0	0	0	0
Total		5	0	5	62	0	0	0	0	0	0	0
