= Ilikena Vudogo =

Fijian rugby union player (born 1998)

- Born: 3 November 1998 (age 28) Fiji
- Height: 180 cm (5 ft 11 in)
- Weight: 100 kg (220 lb; 15 st 10 lb)

Rugby union career
- Position: Centre / Wing
- Current team: Rebels
Youth career
- Brisbane Broncos
Senior career
Years	Team	Apps	(Points)
2021–2023	Rebels	2	(0)
- Correct as of 16 June 2023
International career
Years	Team	Apps	(Points)
2018	Fiji U20	4	(20)
- Correct as of 12 June 2021

Ilikena Vudogo (born 3 November 1998) is a Fijian rugby union player who plays for the Rebels in Super Rugby. His playing position is centre or wing. He was named in the Rebels squad for the 2021 Super Rugby AU season. He had previously represented Fiji U20s and also spent time as a development player at the Brisbane Broncos.

== Super Rugby statistics ==
As of 3 June 2023

Season	Team	Games	Starts	Sub	Mins	Tries	Cons	Pens	Drops	Points	Yel	Red
2021 AU	Rebels	0	0	0	0	0	0	0	0	0	0	0
2021 TT	Rebels	1	0	1	16	0	0	0	0	0	0	0
2022	Rebels	1	0	1	11	0	0	0	0	0	0	0
2023	Rebels	0	0	0	0	0	0	0	0	0	0	0
Total		2	0	2	27	0	0	0	0	0	0	0
