= Michael Icely =

Australian rugby union player

- Born: 12 May 1997 (age 29) Sydney, Australia
- Height: 193 cm (6 ft 4 in)
- Weight: 110 kg (243 lb; 17 st 5 lb)
- School: St Joseph's College, Hunters Hill

Rugby union career
- Position: Flanker / Number 8
- Current team: Australia Sevens
Amateur team(s)
Years	Team	Apps	(Points)
2019−pres.	Eastwood Rugby	70	(230)
Senior career
Years	Team	Apps	(Points)
2019−pres.	NSW Country Eagles	3	(0)
2021–2022	Rebels	2	(0)
2023	Waratahs	1	(0)
- Correct as of 13 November 2022
National sevens team
Years	Team		Comps
2022–	Australia Sevens		10
- Correct as of 30 May 2022

Michael Icely (born 12 May 1997) is an Australian rugby union player who played for both the Rebels and the Waratahs in Super Rugby. His playing position is flanker or number 8.

== Rugby career ==
Icely debuted for the Rebels squad for Round 1 of the Super Rugby Trans-Tasman competition. He previously represented NSW Country Eagles in the 2019 National Rugby Championship.

Icely plays for Eastwood Rugby in the Shute Shield, where he has won both Shute Shield Rookie of the Year (2019) and Ken Catchpole Medal (2023).

In 2024, he was named as a traveling reserve for the Australian sevens team to the Paris Olympics.

== Super Rugby statistics ==
As of 30 May 2024

Season	Team	Games	Starts	Sub	Mins	Tries	Cons	Pens	Drops	Points	Yel	Red
2021 TT	Rebels	2	0	2	24	0	0	0	0	0	0	0
2022	Rebels	0	0	0	0	0	0	0	0	0	0	0
2023	Waratahs	1	0	1	23	0	0	0	0	0	0	0
Total		3	0	3	47	0	0	0	0	0	0	0
