= Gareth Simpson =

English rugby union player (born 1997)

- Born: Gareth Grant Simpson; 2 November 1997 (age 29) Coventry, England
- Height: 1.78 m (5 ft 10 in)
- Weight: 83 kg (13 st 1 lb)

Rugby union career
- Position: Scrum-half/Fly-half
- Current team: Saracens
Senior career
Years	Team	Apps	(Points)
2019–2022	Worcester Warriors	45	(0)
2019	→ Stourbridge	0	(0)
2022	Saracens	0	(0)
2023	Western Force	5	(10)
2023–	Saracens	17	(5)
- Correct as of 29 November 2024
Provincial / State sides
Years	Team	Apps	(Points)
2017–2018	Sharks (Currie Cup)		
2018	Wellington		
- Correct as of 29 November 2024

Gareth Simpson (born 2 November 1997) is an English born South African rugby union player.

Simpson played in the Currie Cup for Sharks in his native South Africa and also had a stint playing for Wellington in the Mitre 10 Cup in New Zealand before he moved to England. He joined the Worcester Warriors academy in the summer of 2019 having spent the second half of the 2018–19 season on trial at Sixways Stadium. He played regularly for the Cavaliers in the Premiership Rugby Shield and for Stourbridge in National League 2 North.

Simpson played for the Warriors in the Premiership Rugby Sevens Series at Northampton in September 2019. He made his senior debut off the bench in the Premiership Rugby Cup 57–23 victory over Leicester Tigers at Sixways the following week. He scored his first Warriors try when he came on as a replacement in the European Rugby Challenge Cup victory over Enisei-STM in Russia.

Simpson was included in a Gallagher Premiership squad for the first time when he was an unused replacement against Exeter Chiefs in November 2019 and made his debut in the competition at Wasps in August 2020.

Having impressed in the first three months of the 2019–20 season, Simpson signed a two-year contract, his first full-time professional deal, thus promoted to the senior squad from the 2020–21 season.

On 5 October 2022 all Worcester players had their contacts terminated due to the liquidation of the company to which they were contracted.

After Worcester was liquidated, he spent time with Saracens as injury cover from the start of the 2022–23 season. On 2 April 2023, Simpson would move to Australia to sign for Western Force for the 2023 Super Rugby Pacific season. This is because he would re-join Saracens on a permanent two-year deal back in the Premiership for the 2023–24 season.
