= Hunter Ward =

Australian rugby union player

- Born: Australia

Rugby union career
- Position: Flanker
- Current team: Waratahs
Senior career
Years	Team	Apps	(Points)
2023-2024	Waratahs	4	(0)
- Correct as of 11 May 2024

Hunter Ward is an Australian rugby union player, who most recently played for the Waratahs. His preferred position is flanker.

== Early career ==
Ward is from Orange, New South Wales, and moved to the coast to represent Manly at club level, where he earned the nickname the 'Combat Wombat'.

== Professional career ==
Ward was called into the Waratahs squad ahead of Round 6 of the 2023 Super Rugby Pacific season. He made his debut in this match against the Brumbies, before making a further appearance in Round 9 starting against the Blues.
