= Angelo Smith =

Fijian rugby union player (born 2000)

- Born: 27 July 2000 (age 26) Fiji
- Height: 1.99 m (6 ft 6 in)
- Weight: 115 kg (254 lb)
- School: Marist Brothers High School

Rugby union career
- Position: Lock
- Current team: Fijian Drua
Amateur team(s)
Years	Team	Apps	(Points)
2021–2025	Wests		
Senior career
Years	Team	Apps	(Points)
2023–2024	Melbourne Rebels	20	(20)
2025	Waratahs	0	(0)
2026–	Fijian Drua	0	(0)
- Correct as of 19 August 2025
International career
Years	Team	Apps	(Points)
2019	Fiji U20		
- Correct as of 5 March 2023

Angelo Smith is a Fijian rugby union player who currently plays for the Fijian Drua in the Super Rugby. His preferred position is lock.

== Early career ==
Smith attended Marist Brothers High School and St Thomas High School, where he was a teammate of Fiji international Chris Minimbi. After visiting family in New Zealand, Smith was invited to feature for the New Zealand Fiji Schoolboys team, although he could not raise enough money to join the academy in New Zealand full-time.

== Professional career ==
=== Rebels, Waratahs ===
Smith received his big break when representing Wests Rugby in the Hospital Cup, where the Wests Bulldogs ended a 16-year drought to win the trophy. With the Wests club having a close connection with the Melbourne Rebels side, he was first offered a pre-season contract with the club for the 2022 off-season. He signed full time with the side in January 2023, before making his Rebels debut in Round 2 of the 2023 Super Rugby Pacific season against the Hurricanes.

He has signed for the Waratahs for the 2025 season. Smith did not feature in any matches for the Waratahs in the 2025 season.

=== Fijian Drua ===
In June 2025, the Fijian Drua announced the signing of Smith for the upcoming 2026 season.

== International career ==
Smith has also represented Fiji U20s.

== Super Rugby statistics ==
As of 3 June 2023

Season	Team	Games	Starts	Sub	Mins	Tries	Cons	Pens	Drops	Points	Yel	Red
2023	Rebels	8	2	6	269	1	0	0	0	5	0	0
Total		8	2	6	269	1	0	0	0	5	0	0
