= Connor Anderson =

Australian rugby union player

- Born: 13 May 1996 (age 30) Brisbane, Australia
- Height: 1.91 m (6 ft 3 in)
- Weight: 107 kg (16 st 12 lb)
- School: Brisbane State High School

Rugby union career
- Position(s): Flanker, Number 8
- Current team: Chugoku Red Regulions
Amateur team(s)
| Years | Team | Apps | (Points) |
- Wests
Senior career
| Years | Team | Apps | (Points) |
| 2019 | Brisbane City | 4 | (0) |
| 2023–2024 | Reds | 3 | |
| 2024– | Chugoku Red Regulions | 17 | (0) |
- Correct as of 7 June 2024

Connor Anderson (born 13 May 1996) is an Australian rugby union player who plays for the Reds in Super Rugby. His playing position is flanker. He was named in the Reds squad for the 2023 Super Rugby Pacific season. He previously represented Brisbane City in the 2019 National Rugby Championship.

Anderson was born in Brisbane and represents Wests in the Queensland Premier Rugby. He was named in the Queensland U20 squad in 2016 and earned selection for Brisbane City in 2019. 2022 was a breakout year for Anderson, winning the Hospital Cup with Wests and winning the Alec Evans Medal for best player, earning him selection for the Reds pre-season tour to Japan. On the tour, he made his Queensland debut against Saitama Wild Knights. He signed for the Reds for two seasons in November 2022.
