= Tim Cardall =

English rugby union player

- Full name: Timothy James Cardall
- Born: 13 January 1997 (age 29) Huntingdon, Cambridgeshire, England
- Height: 198 cm (6 ft 6 in)
- Weight: 121 kg (267 lb; 19 st 1 lb)
- University: Nottingham Trent University

Rugby union career
- Position: Lock
- Current team: Mitsubishi Dynaboars
Senior career
Years	Team	Apps	(Points)
2016–2018	Nottingham		
2018–2022	Wasps	55	(5)
2023	Rebels	3	(0)
2023–2026	Newcastle Falcons	25	(10)
2026–	Mitsubishi Dynaboars		
- Correct as of 3 June 2023

Tim Cardall (born 13 January 1997) is an English rugby union player, who previously played as a lock for the Rebels in Super Rugby. He previously played for the Wasps in Premiership Rugby.

On 27 February 2023, Cardall would return to England to join Premiership side Newcastle Falcons on a two-year deal from the 2023–24 season.

== Super Rugby statistics ==
As of 3 June 2023

Season	Team	Games	Starts	Sub	Mins	Tries	Cons	Pens	Drops	Points	Yel	Red
2023	Rebels	3	0	3	62	0	0	0	0	0	0	0
Total		3	0	3	62	0	0	0	0	0	0	0
