= Ola Tauelangi =

Australian rugby union player

- Born: 28 November 1999 (age 26) Ballarat, Victoria, Australia
- Height: 194 cm (6 ft 4 in)
- Weight: 115 kg (254 lb; 18 st 2 lb)
- School: St Patrick's College, Ballarat

Rugby union career
- Position: Flanker
- Current team: Auckland
Senior career
Years	Team	Apps	(Points)
2019	Melbourne Rising		
2023	Waratahs	1	(0)
2024–2026	Moana Pasifika	11	(0)
2024–	Auckland	6	(0)
- Correct as of 5 November 2024

Ola Tauelangi (born 28 November 1999) is an Australian rugby union player of Tongan descent, who played as flanker for Moana Pasifika in Super Rugby and plays for Auckland in New Zealand's domestic National Provincial Championship competition.

== Early career ==
Tauelangi hails from Ballarat, Victoria, where he attended St Patrick's College. He started playing rugby when he was 16 years old and played 1st XV rugby for the school. He was selected to the Melbourne Rising Academy in 2019.

== Senior career ==
Tauelangi was named in the Melbourne Rising squad for the 2019 National Rugby Championship where he made his professional debut.

In 2020, Tauelangi moved to New South Wales and played for Gordon RFC in the Shute Shield from seasons 2020 through to 2022. His performances for Gordon earned him the attention of the Waratahs, who invited him to train with the side in pre-season. Having trained with the Waratahs in both 2021 and 2022, it wasn't until 2023 when Tauelangi was called into the side as an injury replacement ahead of Round 12 of the 2023 Super Rugby Pacific season. He was named on the bench against the Rebels and featured in the final minutes of the game.

Tauelangi was named in the Moana Pasifika squad for the 2024 Super Rugby Pacific season. He made his debut for the club, from the bench, on 2 March 2024 against the Fijian Drua.

On 29 July 2024, Tauelangi was named in the Auckland squad for the 2024 Bunnings NPC season. He played his first game for the province against Wellington on 9 August 2024.
