= Lukas Ripley =

Australian rugby union player

- Born: 15 April 2002 (age 24) Samoa
- Height: 184 cm (6 ft 0 in)
- Weight: 98 kg (216 lb)

Rugby union career
- Position(s): Centre, Wing
- Current team: Hawke's Bay
Senior career
Years	Team	Apps	(Points)
2022–2024	Rebels	16	(30)
2024–	Hawke's Bay	12	(25)
2025	Waratahs	0	(0)
- Correct as of 13 December 2025

Lukas Ripley (born 15 April 2002) is an Australian rugby union player, who currently plays as a wing or centre for Hawke's Bay in New Zealand's domestic National Provincial Championship competition and for the Waratahs in Super Rugby. He previously played for the – now defunct – Super Rugby franchise Melbourne Rebels.

Ripley was named in the Rebels wider-training squad for the 2022 Super Rugby Pacific season. He made his Rebels debut in Round 3 of the 2022 Super Rugby Pacific season against the Drua.

On 29 July 2024, Ripley was named in the Hawke's Bay squad for the 2024 Bunnings NPC season.

Ripley was named in the Waratahs squad for the 2025 Super Rugby Pacific season on 11 November 2024.

== Super Rugby statistics ==
As of 3 June 2023

Season	Team	Games	Starts	Sub	Mins	Tries	Cons	Pens	Drops	Points	Yel	Red
2022	Rebels	6	4	2	360	4	0	0	0	20	0	0
2023	Rebels	7	2	5	296	0	0	0	0	0	0	0
Total		13	6	7	656	4	0	0	0	20	0	0
