= Simon Cron =

New Zealand rugby union coach

- Born: New Zealand
- School: Christchurch Boys' High School
- University: University of Canterbury

Rugby union career
- Position: Head coach
- Current team: Force
Coaching career
- Years: Team
- 2015–2017: Northern Suburbs
- 2016: Sydney Rays
- 2017: Australia U20s
- 2018–2019: Waratahs (assistant coach)
- 2019–2022: Toyota Verblitz
- 2023–: Force

Simon Cron is a New Zealand born professional rugby union football coach. He is currently head coach of the Western Force rugby team that plays in the Super Rugby Pacific competition. He was appointed Western Force head coach ahead of the 2023 Super Rugby Pacific season in March 2022. Cron's rugby coaching journey included being head coach at Northern Suburbs Rugby Football Club in the Shute Shield competition. In 2016 he led them to the Shute Shield premiership, breaking a 41 year drought. In 2016 Cron was appointed head coach of the Sydney Rays in the National Rugby Championship (NRC). In 2017 he also became the head coach of the Australia U20s. This was followed by two year spell as Waratahs assistant coach, which included a Semi-final appearance against the Lions in Johannesburg in 2018. At the end of 2019 Cron moved to Japan as head coach of Toyota Verblitz, before returning to Australia to coach the Force. In 2025 Cron was appointed the head coach of the Australia A Rugby team.
