= Taj Annan =

Australian rugby union & league player

Personal information
- Born: 16 August 2003 (age 22) Merewether, New South Wales, Australia
- Height: 193 cm (6 ft 4 in)
- Weight: 105 kg (16 st 7 lb)

Playing information

Rugby union
- Position: Fly-half / Centre / Fullback
Club
Years	Team	Pld	T	G	FG	P
2023–24	Queensland Reds	12	0	0	0	0
Representative
Years	Team	Pld	T	G	FG	P
2022–24	Australian U20	6	0	0	0	0

Rugby league
- Position: Wing
Club
Years	Team	Pld	T	G	FG	P
2025	Newcastle Knights	0	0	0	0	0
- As of 13 October 2024

Taj Annan (born 16 August 2003) is an Australian professional rugby league footballer who plays as a winger for the Newcastle Knights in the National Rugby League.

He previously played rugby union as a fly-half, centre or fullback for rugby union team Queensland Reds.

== Early career ==
Originally from Merewether, New South Wales, Annan moved to and studied at Brisbane Boys' College.

== Rugby union career ==
Having left school, Annan joined Easts. Annan was named in the Reds development squad for the 2022 Super Rugby Pacific season, before being named in the side for Round 1 of the 2023 Super Rugby Pacific season, where he made his debut against the Hurricanes.

He was named in the Australia U20 squad in 2023, while he will also move to join Souths.

== Rugby league career ==
In September 2024, Annan made the decision to switch to rugby league, signing a 3-year contract with National Rugby League team and hometown club, Newcastle Knights starting in 2025.
