= David Vaihu =

Australian rugby union player (born 2003)

- Born: 4 April 2003 (age 23)
- Height: 182 cm (6 ft 0 in)
- Weight: 91 kg (201 lb)
- School: Gregory Terrace
- Notable relative: Glen Vaihu (brother)

Rugby union career
- Position: Centre
Super Rugby
Years	Team	Apps	(Points)
2024	Rebels	1	(0)

David Vaihu (born 4 April 2003) is an Australian professional rugby union player.

Vaihu is the younger brother of Melbourne Rebels player Glen and attended St Joseph's College, Gregory Terrace.

An Australian under-20s representative, Vaihu joined the Rebels squad in 2024 and got his opportunity in the final round of the season, coming on off the bench against the Fijian Drua at Churchill Park in Lautoka.

== See also ==
- List of Melbourne Rebels players
