= Siosifa Amone =

Australian rugby union player

- Born: 25 February 2002 (age 24) Sydney, Australia
- Height: 180 cm (5 ft 11 in)
- Weight: 125 kg (276 lb; 19 st 10 lb)

Rugby union career
- Position: Prop
- Current team: Waratahs
Senior career
Years	Team	Apps	(Points)
2023–2024	Western Force	13	(10)
- Correct as of 11 September 2024

Siosifa Amone (born 25 February 2002) is an Australian rugby union player, who plays for the Waratahs. His preferred position is prop.

== Early career ==
Amone is originally from Sydney and attended Hills Sports High School, but moved to Western Australia to join the Western Force academy in 2021. In 2022, he was a member of the Junior Wallabies.

== Professional career ==
Amone was promoted to the Force senior squad ahead of the 2023 Super Rugby Pacific season. He made his debut in Round 1 of the 2023 season, coming on as a replacement against the Rebels. Amone would go on to play a total of 13 times for the Force until he was released in September 2024.

He has signed for the Waratahs for the 2025 season.
