= Charlie Cale =

Australian rugby union player

- Born: 6 October 2000 (age 26) Dubbo, Australia
- Height: 195 cm (6 ft 5 in)
- Weight: 105 kg (231 lb)

Rugby union career
- Position: Flanker
- Current team: Brumbies
Senior career
| Years | Team | Apps | (Points) |
| 2023– | ACT Brumbies | 27 | (85) |
- Correct as of 5 June 2026
International career
| Years | Team | Apps | (Points) |
| 2024– | Australia | 6 | (5) |
- Correct as of 8 September 2026

Charlie Cale (born 6 October 2000) is an Australian rugby union player, who plays for the Brumbies. His preferred position is flanker.

== Early career ==
Cale is originally from Narromine, New South Wales and represented Eastwood in the Shute Shield. He moved to the ACT territory in September 2021, and started representing Uni-Norths Owls.

== Professional career ==
Cale was named in the Brumbies squad ahead of the 2023 Super Rugby Pacific season. He made his debut for the Brumbies in Round 4 of the 2023 season against Moana Pasifika.
