= Jake Upfield =

Australian rugby union player

- Born: 18 May 1995 (age 31) Australia
- Height: 198 cm (6 ft 6 in)
- Weight: 111 kg (245 lb; 17 st 7 lb)
- University: Bond University

Rugby union career
- Position: Lock / Flanker
- Current team: Reds
Senior career
Years	Team	Apps	(Points)
2017–2020	Jersey Reds		
2023	Reds	10	(5)
- Correct as of 21 July 2023

Jake Upfield (born 18 May 1995) is an Australian rugby union player, currently playing for the Reds. His preferred position is lock or flanker.

== Early career ==
Upfield graduated Bond University in 2017, before moving to the UK.

== Professional career ==
Upfield joined Jersey Reds in 2017. He remained with the side until 2021 when he returned to Australia to continue his studies.

Ahead of the 2023 Super Rugby Pacific season, Upfield was called into the Reds squad as it suffered with injuries in the lock position. He made his debut in Round 1 against the Hurricanes.
