= Ray Nu'u =

New Zealand rugby union player

- Born: Raymond Nu'u; 23 April 1998 (age 28) New Zealand
- Height: 1.80 m (5 ft 11 in)
- Weight: 96 kg (15 st 2 lb; 212 lb)
- School: St Andrew's College, Christchurch
- Occupation: Professional Rugby Player

Rugby union career
- Position: Centre
- Current team: Colomiers
Senior career
Years	Team	Apps	(Points)
2018–2020	Southland	27	(10)
2021–2022	Otago	13	(5)
2022–2023	Rebels	8	(10)
2023–	Colomiers	49	(45)
- Correct as of 3 June 2023

Raymond Nu'u (born 28 April 1998) in a New Zealand rugby union player who played for Otago in the National Provincial Championship (NPC) and is now playing in the ProD2 competition in France for Colomiers Rugby Club. His playing position is centre.

== Early life ==
Nu'u attended St Andrew's College in Christchurch. He played for Canterbury age-group sides before linking up with the Crusaders Academy. Nu'u moved to Invercargill in 2018.

== Rugby career ==
In 2018 Nu'u made his debut for Southland in a 52–7 loss against Wellington on 31 August. He would go on to make 7 appearances in his maiden season.

Nu'u played a further two seasons for Southland, making 27 appearances overall for the Stags. Nu'u scored his first try against Manawatu on 14 September 2019; he would score another try against Bay of Plenty on 10 October that same season.

In 2021 Nu'u signed for Otago. Nu'u made his Otago debut on 14 August in a 34–10 defeat away to Hawke's Bay.

In 2022 he made his debut for the SuperRugby team Melbourne Rebels before landing a 2 year contract in French ProD2 competition for Colomiers Rugby. He has since resigned for a further 3 years where he has become an integral centre scoring 3 tries for the 2025/2026 season and committing to Colomiers until 2028.

== Super Rugby and Pro D2 statistics ==
As of 3 June 2023

Season	Team	Games	Starts	Sub	Mins	Tries	Cons	Pens	Drops	Points	Yel	Red
2022	Rebels	8	7	1	543	2	0	0	0	10	0	2
2023	Rebels	0	0	0	0	0	0	0	0	00	0	0
2023–24	Colomiers	15	15	0	994	1	0	0	0	05	1	1
2024–25	Colomiers	22	19	3	1478	5	0	0	0	25	1	0
2025–26	Colomiers	12	11	1	859	3	0	0	0	15	0	0
Total		57	52	5	3874	11	0	0	0	55	2	3
