= Declan Meredith =

Australian rugby union player

- Born: 28 June 1999 (age 27) Cairns, Australia
- Height: 183 cm (6 ft 0 in)
- Weight: 88 kg (194 lb)
- School: Redlynch State College

Rugby union career
- Position(s): Fullback, Fly-half
- Current team: Brumbies
Youth career
- Barron Trinity
Senior career
Years	Team	Apps	(Points)
2023–	Brumbies	33	(57)
- Correct as of 5 June 2026
International career
Years	Team	Apps	(Points)
2026–	Australia	5	(2)
- Correct as of 17 October 2026

Declan Meredith (born 28 June 1999) is an Australian rugby union player, currently playing for the Brumbies. His playing position is either fullback or fly-half.

== Early career ==
Meredith grew up in Queensland, playing his junior rugby for Barron Trinity Rugby Club in Cairns, and represented North Queensland at junior level in 2018. Meredith moved to Canberra in 2019 to play for the Wests Lions Rugby Club.

== Club career ==
Meredith was named in the Brumbies squad ahead of the 2023 Super Rugby Pacific season. He was named in the Brumbies squad for Round 5 of the 2023 Super Rugby Pacific season, making his debut as a replacement against the Crusaders.

In the 2026 Super Rugby Pacific season, Meredith established himself as the Brumbies' first-choice fly-half. He played in all 15 matches, making 14 starts.

== International career ==
In June 2026, Meredith was named in the 37-man Australia squad for the July 2026 Nations Championship Tests. On 11 July 2026, Meredith made his international debut for Australia in a 42-26 loss to France at Lang Park.
