= Nikolai Foliaki =

Tongan rugby union player

- Born: 25 December 1997 (age 28) New Zealand
- Height: 191 cm (6 ft 3 in)
- Weight: 103 kg (227 lb; 16 st 3 lb)

Rugby union career
- Position: Centre
- Current team: Force / Counties Manukau
Senior career
Years	Team	Apps	(Points)
2019-23	Counties Manukau	21	(5)
2023-24	Force	2	(0)
2025–	New Orleans Gold	7	(0)
- Correct as of 6 Apr 2025
International career
Years	Team	Apps	(Points)
2021–	Tonga	8	(0)
- Correct as of 14 Sep 2024

Nikolai Foliaki (born 25 December 1997) is a Tongan rugby union player, currently playing for the Force and Counties Manukau. His preferred position is centre.

== Early career ==
Foliaki plays his club rugby for Karaka RFC.

== Professional career ==
Foliaki was first named in the Counties Manukau squad for the 2019 Mitre 10 Cup, and was again named in the 2022 squad. Having spent pre-season with the Western Force, he was named in their squad for Round 3 of the 2023 Super Rugby Pacific season against Moana Pasifika.

He made his debut for Tonga in 2021 against New Zealand.
