= Pedro Rolando =

Argentine rugby union player

- Born: 21 June 1989 (age 37) Argentina
- Height: 172 cm (5 ft 8 in)
- Weight: 80 kg (176 lb; 12 st 8 lb)

Rugby union career
- Position: Scrum-half
- Current team: Brumbies
Senior career
Years	Team	Apps	(Points)
2017	Canberra Vikings		
2023–	Brumbies	1	(0)
- Correct as of 29 May 2023

Pedro Rolando (born 21 June 1989) is an Argentine rugby union player, currently playing for the Brumbies. His preferred position is scrum-half.

== Early career ==
Rolando is from Argentina where he made his debut in his former club, Club San Patricio, but moved to Canberra in the 2012. He plays his club rugby for Canberra Royals and works as a strength & conditioning coach professionally.

== Professional career ==
Rolando was named in the Canberra Vikings squad for the 2017 National Rugby Championship. He was named in the Brumbies squad for Round 5 of the 2023 Super Rugby Pacific season, making his debut as a replacement against the Crusaders.
