= Tamati Ioane =

Australian rugby union player

- Born: 26 April 1997 (age 29) Australia
- Height: 1.84 m (6 ft 1/2 in)
- Weight: 119 kg (262 lb)
- School: De La Salle College

Rugby union career
- Position: Flanker / Number 8
- Current team: Urayasu D-Rocks
Senior career
Years	Team	Apps	(Points)
2022–2023	Rebels	15	(0)
2024–2025	Tokyo Sungoliath	18	(40)
2025–	Urayasu D-Rocks	20	(40)
- Correct as of 16 June 2023

Tamati Ioane (born 26 April 1997) is an Australian rugby union player who plays for the Rebels in Super Rugby. His playing position is flanker or number 8. He was named in the Rebels squad for the 2022 Super Rugby Pacific season. He made his Rebels debut in Round 1 of the 2022 Super Rugby Pacific season against the Reds.

== Super Rugby statistics ==
As of 3 May 2023

Season	Team	Games	Starts	Sub	Mins	Tries	Cons	Pens	Drops	Points	Yel	Red
2022	Rebels	10	5	5	479	0	0	0	0	0	0	0
2023	Rebels	5	1	4	163	0	0	0	0	0	0	0
Total		15	6	9	642	0	0	0	0	0	0	0
