= Paddy James =

Australian rugby union player

- Full name: Patrick James
- Born: 31 May 1995 (age 31) Australia
- Height: 185 cm (6 ft 1 in)
- Weight: 88 kg (194 lb; 13 st 12 lb)

Rugby union career
- Position: Fly-half / Centre / Fullback
Senior career
Years	Team	Apps	(Points)
2015–2016	Brisbane City		
2017–2019	Queensland Country		
2023	Reds	1	(0)
- Correct as of 26 November 2023

Paddy James (born 31 May 1995) is an Australian rugby union player, who most recently played for the Reds. His preferred position is fly-half, centre or fullback.

== Early career ==
James plays his club rugby for Brothers.

== Professional career ==
James began his professional career at Brisbane City who he played for in the 2015 and 2016 National Rugby Championship. He moved to Queensland Country ahead of 2017 who he'd represent in 2018 and 2019 also. In 2023, he was called into the Reds squad ahead of Round 12 of the 2023 Super Rugby Pacific season, where he debuted as a replacement against the Chiefs.
