= Rhys van Nek =

Australian rugby union player

- Born: 17 July 1999 (age 27) Australia
- Height: 177 cm (5 ft 10 in)
- Weight: 118 kg (260 lb; 18 st 8 lb)

Rugby union career
- Position: Prop
- Current team: Brumbies
Senior career
Years	Team	Apps	(Points)
2019	Brisbane City	6	(0)
2021–2022	Rebels	8	(0)
2023-	Brumbies	44	(20)
- Correct as of 5 June 2026
International career
Years	Team	Apps	(Points)
2019	Australia U20	1	(0)
- Correct as of 15 February 2021
Medal record
Men's rugby union
Representing Australia
Junior World Cup
Runner-up	2019 Argentina

Rhys van Nek (born 17 July 1999) is an Australian rugby union player who plays for the Brumbies in Super Rugby. His playing position is prop. He was named in the Rebels squad for the 2021 Super Rugby AU season. He previously represented Brisbane City in the 2019 National Rugby Championship.

== Super Rugby statistics ==
As of 30 May 2022

Season	Team	Games	Starts	Sub	Mins	Tries	Cons	Pens	Drops	Points	Yel	Red
2021 AU	Rebels	1	0	1	18	0	0	0	0	0	0	0
2021 TT	Rebels	2	0	2	37	0	0	0	0	0	0	0
2022	Rebels	5	0	5	61	0	0	0	0	0	0	0
2023	Brumbies	1	0	1	20	0	0	0	0	0	0	0
Total		89	0	9	136	0	0	0	0	0	0	0
