= Klayton Thorn =

Australian rugby union player

- Born: 6 June 2003 (age 23) Australia
- Height: 180 cm (5 ft 11 in)
- Weight: 85 kg (187 lb; 13 st 5 lb)
- School: Waverley College

Rugby union career
- Position: Scrum-half
- Current team: Brumbies
Senior career
Years	Team	Apps	(Points)
2023–	Brumbies	18	(0)
- Correct as of 5 June 2026
International career
Years	Team	Apps	(Points)
2023	Australia U20	5	(5)
- Correct as of 29 May 2023

Klayton Thorn (born 6 June 2003) is an Australian rugby union player, currently playing for the Brumbies. His preferred position is scrum-half.

== Early career ==
Thorn is from Maroubra, New South Wales and represented Randwick at junior levels. He rose to prominence when rescuing a swimmer from drowning at a local swimming pool.

== Professional career ==
Thorn was named in the Brumbies squad ahead of the 2023 Super Rugby Pacific season. He was named in the Brumbies squad for Round 13 of the 2023 Super Rugby Pacific season, making his debut as a replacement against the Western Force.
