= Sam Spink =

English rugby union player

- Born: Samuel John Spink; 6 October 1999 (age 27) Kingston upon Thames, England
- Height: 1.84 m (6 ft 0 in)
- Weight: 103 kg (16 st 3 lb)
- School: Hinchley Wood School; Wellington College

Rugby union career
- Position: Centre
- Current team: Toshiba Brave Lupus
Senior career
Years	Team	Apps	(Points)
2018–2022	Wasps	28	(15)
2019–2021	→ Nottingham (loan)	2	(5)
2023–2024	Western Force	23	(15)
2024–2026	Saracens	11	(10)
2025-26	Ampthill	2	(0)
2026–	Toshiba Brave Lupus		
- Correct as of 1 June 2024
International career
Years	Team	Apps	(Points)
2017–2018	England U18	4	(5)
2019	England U20	1	(0)
- Correct as of 28 December 2020

Sam Spink (born 6 October 1999) is an English professional rugby union player who plays as a centre for Premiership Rugby club Saracens.

== Career ==
In August 2017 Spink represented England under-18. An ankle injury meant he missed the 2019 World Rugby Under 20 Championship.

Spink played 26 games and scored three tries for Wasps RFC between 2018 and 2022, and also spent time on loan at Nottingham. In his last season at Wasps he played in their 2021–22 EPCR Challenge Cup semi-final defeat against Lyon. In October 2022 Wasps entered administration and Spink was made redundant along with all other players and coaching staff.

Spink joined Western Force and scored two tries in a game against Melbourne Rebels during the 2023 Super Rugby Pacific season. He also featured in the following 2024 campaign.

In April 2024 it was confirmed that Spink would leave Force to join Saracens.
