= Blake Schoupp =

Australian rugby union player

- Born: 28 March 1998 (age 28) Wollongong, Australia
- Height: 181 cm (5 ft 11 in)
- Weight: 117 kg (258 lb; 18 st 6 lb)
- School: Nudgee College
- Notable relative: Aaron Schoupp (brother)

Rugby union career
- Position: Prop / Hooker
- Current team: Brumbies
Senior career
Years	Team	Apps	(Points)
2018–2022	Southern Districts		
2023–	Brumbies	49	(0)
- Correct as of 5 June 2026
International career
Years	Team	Apps	(Points)
2023-	Australia	5	(0)
- Correct as of 13 October 2023

Blake Schoupp (born 28 March 1998) is an Australian rugby union player, currently playing for the Brumbies. His preferred position is prop or hooker.

== Early career ==
Schoupp played junior rugby for Woonona Shamrocks RUFC before studying at Nudgee College. He returned to Sydney, first representing Randwick before joining Southern Districts.

He is the brother of NRL player Aaron Schoupp.

== Professional career ==
=== Brumbies ===
Schoupp trained with the Waratahs as COVID-19 cover, before joining the Brumbies for pre-season in 2023, being named in their elite development squad. His performances in training earned him a start in Round 1 of the 2023 Super Rugby Pacific season where he made his debut against the Waratahs. He made 14 appearances for the Brumbies in his debut season, including 4 starts.

=== Wallabies ===
In August 2023 Schoupp was named in the 33 man Australian Wallabies squad for the 2023 Rugby World Cup. He made his test debut on 27 August 2023 against France, coming off the bench in a World Cup warm-up match.
