= Zac Von Appen =

Australian rugby union player

- Born: 25 July 1997 (age 29) Australia
- Height: 195 cm (6 ft 5 in)
- Weight: 122 kg (269 lb; 19 st 3 lb)

Rugby union career
- Position: Lock
Senior career
Years	Team	Apps	(Points)
2023	Waratahs	3	(0)
- Correct as of 26 November 2023

Zac Von Appen (born 25 July 1997) is an Australian rugby union player, who most recently played for the Waratahs. His preferred position is lock.

== Early career ==
Von Appen attended St Augustine's College, Sydney and Sydney University where he played rugby and rowed. He plays his club rugby for Sydney University. He is the son of German canoeist Mario Von Appen.

== Professional career ==
Von Appen was named in the Waratahs squad for the 2023 Super Rugby Pacific season. He made his debut in Round 5 of the season against the Chiefs. He would go on to make a further 2 appearances that season, before departing at the end of the season.
