= Floyd Aubrey =

Australian rugby union player (born 2003)

- Born: 7 February 2003 (age 23) Murgon, Australia
- Height: 178 cm (5 ft 10 in)
- Weight: 83 kg (183 lb)
- School: Marist College Ashgrove

Rugby union career
- Position: Fullback / Wing
Super Rugby
Years	Team	Apps	(Points)
2024	Reds	2	(5)

Floyd Aubrey (born 7 February 2003) is an Australian professional rugby union player.

Hailing from the Queensland town of Murgon, Aubrey is an Indigenous Australian (Wakka Wakka) and attended Marist College Ashgrove in Brisbane. He was named the 2021 Queensland Colt of the Year for his performances with GPS and has trained with the Junior Wallabies. A fullback and winger, Aubrey broke into the Queensland Reds squad in the 2024 Super Rugby Pacific season and made his debut off the bench against the Blues at Suncorp Stadium. He was in the starting XV for the first time in Queensland's match against Fijian Drua in Nadi and scored a try from the wing.

Floyd currently plays for the South Logan Magpies in the Hostplus Cup, which is the premier rugby league competition in the state of Queensland, Australia.

== See also ==
- List of Queensland Reds players
