= Charlie Hancock (rugby union) =

- Born: 13 August 1998 (age 28) Canberra, Australia
- Height: 192 cm (6 ft 4 in)
- Weight: 118 kg (18 st 8 lb; 260 lb)
- School: Canberra Grammar School

Rugby union career
- Position: Prop
Senior career
Years	Team	Apps	(Points)
2018–	Sydney University	42	(25)
Super Rugby
Years	Team	Apps	(Points)
2023–2024	Force	5	(0)
International career
Years	Team	Apps	(Points)
2018	Australia U20	4	(0)

Charlie Hancock (born 13 August 1998) is an Australian rugby union player who played for the Western Force in the Super Rugby Pacific Competition. His playing position is prop. He was signed by the Force for two years in November 2022, and made his debut in round 10 of the 2023 season against the Queensland Reds. Charlie would go on to play a total of 5 times for the Force until he was released in September 2024.

He previously played for Sydney University Football Club, and the Junior Wallabies.
