= Archer Holz =

Australian rugby union player

- Born: 1 March 2000 (age 26) Lightning Ridge, Australia
- Height: 189 cm (6 ft 2 in)
- Weight: 124 kg (273 lb; 19 st 7 lb)
- School: The King's School
- University: UNSW

Rugby union career
- Position: Prop
- Current team: Scarlets
Youth career
- Easts Rugby
Senior career
Years	Team	Apps	(Points)
2021	Brumbies	1	(0)
2022–2024	Waratahs	16	(0)
2024–	Scarlets	17	(0)
International career
Years	Team	Apps	(Points)
2022	Australia A	2	(0)

Archer Holz (born 1 March 2000) is an Australian rugby union player who plays as a tighthead prop for the Scarlets in the United Rugby Championship. He was named in the Brumbies squad for the 2021 Super Rugby AU season. He made his debut in Round 4 of the 2021 Super Rugby AU season in the team's match against the Reds.

== Early life ==
Holz grew up in Lightning Ridge before attending The King's School, Parramatta, where he played in the 1st XV.
