= Tiaan Tauakipulu =

Australian rugby union player

- Born: Auckland, New Zealand
- Height: 183 cm (6 ft 0 in)
- Weight: 119 kg (262 lb; 18 st 10 lb)
- School: St Kentigern College

Rugby union career
- Position: Prop
Super Rugby
Years	Team	Apps	(Points)
2020–2023	Waratahs	4	(0)
2024–present	Western Force	18	(0)
- Correct as of 25 May 2025

Tiaan Tauakipulu is an Australian rugby union player who plays for the Western Force in Super Rugby, having previously played for the Waratahs. His playing position is prop. He was named in the Waratahs elite development squad for the Super Rugby competition in 2020. He made his debut for the Waratahs in round 1 of the Super Rugby AU competition against the Reds, coming on as a replacement.
