= Dane Zander =

Australian rugby union footballer (born 1999)

- Full name: Dane Gordon Zander
- Born: 23 August 1999 (age 27) Brisbane, Australia
- Height: 190 cm (6 ft 3 in)
- Weight: 116 kg (256 lb; 18 st 4 lb)
- School: St Joseph's College, Nudgee
- Notable relative: Gordon Zander [Zillmere Eagles]

Rugby union career
- Position: Prop
- Current team: Los Angeles
Senior career
Years	Team	Apps	(Points)
2019	Brisbane City	8	(0)
2020–2023	Reds	47	(0)
2024-2025	Los Angeles	19	(0)
- Correct as of 23 December 2023

Dane Zander (born 23 August 1999) is a professional Australian rugby union player, who currently plays as a prop for Los Angeles in Major League Rugby.

Zander previously played for the Queensland Reds in Super Rugby. He made his debut for the Reds in round 1 of the 2020 Super Rugby season.
