= Jack Winchester (rugby union) =

Australian rugby union player

- Born: 22 June 2000 (age 26) Sydney, New South Wales, Australia
- Height: 181 cm (5 ft 11 in)
- Weight: 108 kg (238 lb; 17 st 0 lb)

Rugby union career
- Position: Hooker
- Current team: Force
Senior career
Years	Team	Apps	(Points)
2021–2023	Force	8	(0)
- Correct as of 09 November 2023

Jack Winchester (born 22 June 2000 in Australia) is an Australian rugby union player who plays for the Force in Super Rugby. His playing position is hooker. He was named in the Force squad for the 2021 Super Rugby AU season. He made his Super Rugby debut in Round 1 of the 2021 Super Rugby AU season against the Brumbies, coming on as a replacement.
