= Reece Tapine =

Australian rugby union player

- Born: 9 April 1999 (age 27) Gosford, Australia
- Height: 193 cm (6 ft 4 in)
- Weight: 100 kg (220 lb; 15 st 10 lb)

Rugby union career
- Position: Centre / Wing
Super Rugby
Years	Team	Apps	(Points)
2021	Brumbies	0	(0)
2022–2023	Force	2	(0)
- Correct as of 10 July 2023

Reece Tapine (born 9 April 1999) is an Australian rugby union player who plays for the Force in Super Rugby. His playing position is centre or wing. He was named in the Force squad for the 2022 Super Rugby Pacific season. He made his debut for the Force in Round 8 of the 2022 Super Rugby Pacific season against the Rebels.
