= Will Sankey =

Australian rugby union player

- Born: William Sankey Australia
- Height: 2.00 m (6 ft 7 in)
- Weight: 116 kg (256 lb)

Rugby union career
Senior career
Years	Team	Apps	(Points)
2019	Canberra Vikings	2	(0)
- Correct as of 8 April 2022
Super Rugby
Years	Team	Apps	(Points)
2022–2023	Force	3	(0)
- Correct as of 11 july 2023

Will Sankey is a professional Australian rugby union player who plays for the Force in Super Rugby. His playing position is lock. He was named in the Force squad as a late replacement for Round 8 of the 2022 Super Rugby Pacific season. He previously played for the Canberra Vikings in the 2019 National Rugby Championship.
