= Spencer Jeans =

Australian rugby union player

- Born: 19 October 2000 (age 26) Australia
- Height: 1.75 m (5 ft 9 in)
- Weight: 80 kg (180 lb)

Rugby union career
- Position: Scrum-half
- Current team: Kyuden Voltex
Senior career
Years	Team	Apps	(Points)
2022–2023	Reds	5	(0)
2024-	Kyuden Voltex	15	(20)
- Correct as of 17 June 2025

Spencer Jeans (born 19 October 2000) is an Australian rugby union player who plays for the Reds in Super Rugby. His playing position is scrum-half. He was named in the Reds squad for the 2022 Super Rugby Pacific season. He made his Reds debut in Round 2 of the 2022 Super Rugby Pacific season against the Waratahs.
