= Ollie Callan =

Australian professional rugby union player

- Born: Oliver Callan; 20 July 2000 (age 26) London, England
- Height: 185 cm (6 ft 1 in)
- Weight: 100 kg (220 lb; 15 st 10 lb)

Rugby union career
Senior career
| Years | Team | Apps | (Points) |
| 2019– | Force | 0 | (0) |
- Correct as of 11 July 2020
Super Rugby
| Years | Team | Apps | (Points) |
| 2020–2024 | Force | 36 | (10) |
- Correct as of 11 September 2024

Ollie Callan (born 20 July 2000 in England) is an English-born, Australian professional rugby union player who played for the Western Force in Global Rapid Rugby and the Super Rugby AU competition. His playing position is flanker. He was named in the Force squad for the Global Rapid Rugby competition in 2020. Ollie was released by the Force in September 2024.
