= Phransis Sula-Siaosi =

Australian rugby union player

- Born: 15 July 2000 (age 26) New Zealand
- Height: 174 cm (5 ft 9 in)
- Weight: 118 kg (260 lb; 18 st 8 lb)

Rugby union career
- Position: Prop
- Current team: NEC Green Rockets
Senior career
Years	Team	Apps	(Points)
2023	Reds	4	(0)
2025–	NEC Green Rockets		
- Correct as of 26 November 2023

Phransis Sula-Siaosi (born 15 July 2000) is an Australian rugby union player, who most recently played for the Reds. His preferred position is prop.

== Early career ==
Sula-Siaosi was born in New Zealand, but moved to Australia as a child. He plays his club rugby for Souths.

== Professional career ==
Sula-Siasoi was first named in the Queensland Reds squad in 2023. He made his debut in Round 5 of the 2023 Super Rugby Pacific season against the Rebels. He would go on to make a further 3 appearances, before departing at the end of the season.
