= Angus Wagner =

Australian rugby union player

- Born: 30 October 1997 (age 29) Theodore, Queensland, Australia
- Height: 183 cm (6 ft 0 in)
- Weight: 119 kg (262 lb; 18 st 10 lb)

Rugby union career
- Position: Prop
Senior career
Years	Team	Apps	(Points)
2018–19	Canberra Vikings	8	(0)
- Correct as of 23 May 2019
Super Rugby
Years	Team	Apps	(Points)
2019	Brumbies	0	(0)
2020–2024	Western Force	32	(5)
- Correct as of 11 September 2024

Angus Wagner (born 30 October 1997 in Australia) is an Australian rugby union player who played for the Western Force in Super Rugby. His playing position is prop. He was announced as a replacement signing in May 2019. Angus was released by the Western Force in September 2024.
