= Grason Makara =

Australian rugby union player

- Born: Grason Makara; 7 May 2000 (age 26) Kalgoorlie, Western Australia, Australia
- Height: 187 cm (6 ft 2 in)
- Weight: 96 kg (212 lb; 15 st 2 lb)

Rugby union career
Senior career
| Years | Team | Apps | (Points) |
| 2019– | Force | 4 | (0) |
- Correct as of 15 June 2020
Super Rugby
| Years | Team | Apps | (Points) |
| 2020–2023 | Force | 2 | |
- Correct as of 10 July 2023

Grason Makara (born 7 May 2000 in Australia) is an Australian rugby union player who plays for the Force in Global Rapid Rugby and the Super Rugby AU competition. His original playing position is centre. He was named in the Force squad for the Global Rapid Rugby competition in 2020.
