= Sateki Latu =

Australian rugby union player

- Born: 1999 (age 26–27) Australia

Rugby union career
- Position: Prop
- Current team: Moana Pasifika
Senior career
Years	Team	Apps	(Points)
2023	Waratahs	2	(5)
2024	Moana Pasifika	7	(0)
2024	Counties Manukau	4	(0)
- Correct as of 10 April 2026

Sateki Latu is an Australian rugby union player of Tongan descent, who plays for Moana Pasifika. His preferred position is prop.

== Early career ==
Latu is from New South Wales, and has represented the Warringah Rugby Club since 2020. His performances earned him selection in a trial match against the Waratahs ahead of the 2023 season.

== Professional career ==
Following an injury to Angus Bell, Latu was called into the Waratahs side during the 2023 Super Rugby Pacific season. He made his debut for the Waratahs in Round 4 of the season against the Hurricanes. He remained with the team as an injury replacement for the rest of the season, making one further appearance and scoring a try. He was signed by Moana Pasifika on a full-time contract ahead of the 2024 Super Rugby Pacific season.
