= Glen Vaihu =

Australian rugby union player

- Full name: Glen William Vaihu
- Born: 8 October 2001 (age 25) Melbourne, Victoria, Australia
- Height: 1.83 m (6 ft 0 in)
- Weight: 94 kg (207 lb)
- School: Gregory Terrace
- University: University of Melbourne

Rugby union career
- Position: Centre / Wing / Fullback
Senior career
Years	Team	Apps	(Points)
2021–2024	Rebels	29	(30)
2025–2026	AZ-COM Maruwa MOMOTARO’S	7	(35)
2026	Moana Pasifika	13	(10)
- Correct as of 8 June 2024

Glen William Vaihu (born 8 October 2001) is an Australian rugby union player who last played for the Rebels in Super Rugby. His playing position is centre or wing. He was named in the Rebels squad for the 2021 Super Rugby AU season. He made his Rebels debut in Round 2 of the 2021 Super Rugby AU season against the Reds.

Following his release by the Rebels, Vaihu joined rugby league team Souths Logan Magpies in the Queensland Cup competition, playing four games of the 2024 season.

== Super Rugby statistics ==
As of 3 June 2023

Season	Team	Games	Starts	Sub	Mins	Tries	Cons	Pens	Drops	Points	Yel	Red
2021 AU	Rebels	5	0	5	94	0	0	0	0	0	0	0
2021 TT	Rebels	1	1	0	73	1	0	0	0	5	0	0
2022	Rebels	14	13	1	1038	1	0	0	0	5	1	0
2023	Rebels	0	0	0	0	0	0	0	0	0	0	0
Total		20	14	6	1,205	2	0	0	0	10	1	0
