= Jackson Pugh =

Australian rugby union player

- Born: 3 February 2000 (age 26) Perth, Australia
- Height: 197 cm (6 ft 6 in)
- Weight: 113 kg (249 lb; 17 st 11 lb)

Rugby union career
- Position(s): Lock, Number 8, Flanker
- Current team: Skyactivs Hiroshima
Senior career
| Years | Team | Apps | (Points) |
| 2019 | Force | 0 | (0) |
| 2023– | Skyactivs Hiroshima | 38 | (115) |
- Correct as of 4 March 2022
Provincial / State sides
| Years | Team | Apps | (Points) |
| 2022 | Auckland | 11 | (15) |
- Correct as of 14 October 2022
Super Rugby
| Years | Team | Apps | (Points) |
| 2020–2023 | Force | 13 | (15) |
- Correct as of 5 February 2024

Jackson Pugh (born 3 February 2000) is an Australian rugby union player who played occasionally for the Force in Super Rugby while associated with the Perth local club, Palmyra Rugby Union Club. His playing position is lock and was named in the Force squad for the 2022 Super Rugby Pacific season. He made his debut for the Force in Round 3 of the 2022 Super Rugby Pacific season against the Reds. After a Super Rugby season ebded he was seconded by Western Force to finish the southern hemisphere season playing Lock or Number 8 for Auckland in the 2022 season of the Bunnings NPC.

After that experience, he made the decision to seek an early release from his contract with the Western Force to pursue overseas opportunities. He decided to leave Western Australia for (possibly Europe and then) Japan, where, as of 2026, he is still playing.
