= Nephi Leatigaga =

Samoan rugby union player

- Born: Nephi Tupou Leatigaga; 5 December 1993 (age 32) Salelologa, Siumu, Samoa
- Height: 6 ft 4 in (193 cm)
- Weight: 149.1 kg (329 lb; 23 st 7 lb)

Rugby union career
- Position: Loosehead Prop, Tighthead Prop
- Current team: New South Wales Waratahs
Senior career
Years	Team	Apps	(Points)
2016–2017	Piacenza	9	(13)
2017–2019	Biarritz Olympique	29	(20)
2019–2023	Leicester Tigers	77	(5)
2023	New South Wales Waratahs	8	(5)
- Correct as of 19 April 2023
International career
Years	Team	Apps	(Points)
2016–	Samoa	6	(0)
- Correct as of 6 May 2019

Nephi Tupou Leatigaga (born 5 December 1993) is a Samoan rugby union prop for New South Wales Waratahs in Super Rugby. He has previously played for Leicester Tigers in England's Premiership Rugby, Biarritz Olympique in France's Pro D2 and for Piacenza in Italy. He has played six internationals for Samoa in 2016 between 2022.

== Career ==
Leatigaga was born in Samoa; he first played for Mt Wellington RFC and Auckland Rugby Union in New Zealand. After impressing for Samoa 'A' he was called up for Samoa's November 2016 touring squad. He made his international debut on 25 November 2016 against Canada in a 25-23 win at the Stade des Alpes in Grenoble, France. On 18 January 2017 he joined Rugby Lyons Piacenza in Italy's Super 10 On 15 June 2017 his signature was announced by Biarritz Olympique. After a season in France his signature for Leicester was widely reported in the French media in July 2018, which prompted Biarritz to release a statement claiming his agent was unregistered which the agent denied, saying he was registered with the RFU allowing him to sign the player to an English club.

His signing for the 2019-20 season was confirmed by Leicester Tigers on 6 May 2019. Leatigaga played as a replacement in the 2022 Premiership Rugby final as Tigers beat Saracens 15-12. On 19 April 2023 he signing was announced by New South Wales Waratahs as injury cover for Angus Bell.
