= Tom Horton (rugby union) =

Australian rugby union player

- Born: 18 April 1997 (age 29)
- Height: 181 cm (5 ft 11 in)
- Weight: 105 kg (231 lb; 16 st 7 lb)

Rugby union career
- Position: Hooker
Senior career
Years	Team	Apps	(Points)
2018–2019	NSW Country Eagles	9	(5)
2020–2022	Waratahs	26	(15)
2022	Leicester Tigers	4	(20)
2023-2025	Western Force	35	(30)
- Correct as of 21 May 2025

Tom Horton (born 18 April 1997 in Australia) is an Australian rugby union player for Western Force, based in Perth, Australia, who play in Super Rugby. He has previously played for the NSW Waratahs in Super Rugby and for Leicester Tigers in England's Premiership Rugby. His playing position is hooker. He has signed to the Waratahs squad for the 2020 season.

In August 2022 Horton signed for Leicester Tigers in England's Premiership Rugby on a short term deal. Head coach Steve Borthwick described Horton as "tough, hard-working". He was released on 16 December 2022.
