= Fred Kaihea =

Australian rugby union player

- Born: 17 March 1999 (age 27) Christchurch, New Zealand
- Height: 180 cm (5 ft 11 in)
- Weight: 117 kg (258 lb; 18 st 6 lb)

Rugby union career
- Position: Prop
- Current team: Brumbies
Senior career
Years	Team	Apps	(Points)
2019	Canberra Vikings	8	(0)
2020–2024	Brumbies	9	(0)
- Correct as of 14 June 2024

Fred Kaihea (born 17 March 1999 in New Zealand) is a New Zealand-born Australian rugby union player who plays for the Brumbies in Super Rugby. His playing position is prop. He was named in the Brumbies squad for Round 6 of the 2021 Super Rugby AU season. He previously represented the Canberra Vikings in the 2019 National Rugby Championship.
