= Bo Abra =

Australian rugby union player

- Born: 11 July 1999 (age 27) Tamworth, New South Wales, Australia
- Height: 184 cm (6 ft 0 in)
- Weight: 120 kg (265 lb; 18 st 13 lb)

Rugby union career
- Position: Prop
- Current team: Hawke's Bay
Senior career
Years	Team	Apps	(Points)
2019	Canberra Vikings	9	(0)
2021–2023	Force	12	(5)
2023	Hawke's Bay	8	(0)
- Correct as of 15 November 2023
International career
Years	Team	Apps	(Points)
2019	Australia U20	7	(0)
- Correct as of 15 November 2023
Medal record
Men's rugby union
Representing Australia
Oceania U20 Championship
Winner	2019 Gold Coast
Junior World Cup
Runner-up	2019 Argentina

Bo Abra (born 11 July 1999) is an Australian rugby union player, who most recently played for the Force in Super Rugby and for Hawke's Bay in New Zealand's domestic National Provincial Championship competition. His playing position is prop.

Abra was named in the Force wider training squad for the 2021 Super Rugby AU season and made his Super Rugby debut in round 5 of the 2022 Super Rugby Pacific season against Fijian Drua. He previously represented Canberra Vikings in the 2019 National Rugby Championship and the Junior Wallabies at the 2019 Oceania Rugby Under 20 Championship and 2019 World Rugby Under 20 Championship.

On 25 August 2023, he was named in the Hawke's Bay squad as a replacement player for the 2023 Bunnings NPC season. He played 8 games for the Magpies, all from the bench.
