= Ben Dowling =

Australian rugby union player

- Born: 5 March 2002 (age 24) Sydney, New South Wales, Australia
- Height: 1.84 m (6 ft 0 in)
- Weight: 84 kg (185 lb; 13 st 3 lb)
- School: St. Joseph's College

Rugby union career
- Position(s): Wing, Fullback
- Current team: Randwick
Senior career
| Years | Team | Apps | (Points) |
| 2022– | Randwick | 25 | (44) |
| 2023 | Waratahs | 4 | (0) |
- Correct as of 1 December 2023
National sevens team
| Years | Team | | Comps |
| 2021– | Australia | | 8 |
- Correct as of 1 December 2023

Ben Dowling (born 5 March 2002) is an Australian professional rugby union player who plays as a wing for Shute Shield club Randwick and the Australia national sevens team.

== International career ==
Dowling was born and raised in Sydney, and attended St Joseph's College, having been a member of the Waratahs academy since U18 level, while playing club rugby for Randwick. He has represented Australia at Rugby Sevens since 2021, and was named in the Australia U20 side in 2022.

He has also represented the Australia national rugby sevens team, being named in the squad for the 2022 Commonwealth Games.

In 2024, He was named in the Australian sevens team for the Summer Olympics in Paris.
