= Lopeti Faifua =

Australian rugby union player (born 2002)

- Born: 22 January 2002 (age 24) Myrtleford, Victoria, Australia,
- Height: 1.98 m (6 ft 6 in)
- Weight: 115 kg (254 lb)

Rugby union career
- Position(s): Lock, Flanker
- Current team: Force, Tasman
Senior career
Years	Team	Apps	(Points)
2022–2023	Reds	5	(0)
2024–	Force	21	(10)
2025–	Tasman	21	(15)
- Correct as of 3 October 2026
International career
Years	Team	Apps	(Points)
2022	Australia U20	3	(0)
- Correct as of 3 October 2026

Lopeti Faifua (born 22 January 2002) is an Australian rugby union player who plays for the Force in Super Rugby. His position is lock or flanker. He was named in the Reds squad for the 2022 Super Rugby Pacific season. He made his Reds debut in Round 9 of the 2022 Super Rugby Pacific season against the Rebels.
