= List of 2022 Super Rugby Pacific matches =

This article contains a list of all matches played during the 2022 Super Rugby Pacific regular season. On 23 December 2021, a revised draw was announced due to complications surrounding the COVID-19 pandemic. On 2 February 2022, it was announced that the opening two rounds of matches featuring New Zealand teams, and Moana Pasifika, would take place in Queenstown, with the six sides being placed in bio-secure bubbles due to the threat of COVID-19. On 20 February, the New Zealand-based Round 2 fixtures were reshuffled to allow Moana Pasifika more time to recover, following positive COVID-19 cases in their squad.

== Round 1 ==
18 February 2022
19:45 (GMT +11)

| Waratahs | 40–10 | Drua |
| Try: Harris 13' c Porecki 35' m Foketi 41' m Bell 52' c Gordon 57' c Con: Donaldson (3/5) 14', 53', 58'; Pen: Donaldson (3/3) 8', 20', 22'; Cards: Tauakipulu (yellow card) 80+1' | Report | Try: Nagusa 65' c Con: Kerr (1/1) 65'; Pen: Kerr (1/1) 16'; Cards: Koroiduadua (yellow card) 44' to 54' |

CommBank Stadium, Parramatta
Attendance: 8,367
Referee: Nic Berry (Australia)

19 February 2022
16:35 (GMT +13)

| Chiefs | 26–16 | Highlanders |
| Try: Cane 17' c Sowakula 39' m Narawa 48' m Con: Ioane (1/3) 18'; Pen: Ioane (2/2) 6', 31'; Gatland (1/1) 76' | Report | Try: Lienert-Brown 69' c Con: Hunt (1/1) 70'; Pen: Hunt (3/3) 11', 15', 46' |

Wakatipu Rugby Club, Queenstown
Attendance: Behind closed doors
Referee: Paul Williams (New Zealand)

19 February 2022
19:05 (GMT +13)

| Crusaders | 42–32 | Hurricanes |
| Try: Fainga'anuku (3) 8' c, 14' m, 51' c Penalty try 65'; Klein 71' c Con: Burke (2/3) 9', 52'; Hickey (1/1) 72'; Pen: Burke (3/3) 40+2', 45', 56'; Cards: Jager (yellow card) 35' to 45'; Burke (yellow card) 58' to 68' | Report | Try: Love 28' c Sullivan 69' m Barrett 75' c Garden-Bachop 79' c Con: Barrett (2/3) 30', 76'; Garden-Bachop (1/1) 79'; Pen: Barrett (2/2) 7', 18'; Cards: Iose (yellow card) 65' to 75' |

Forsyth Barr Stadium, Dunedin
Attendance: Behind closed doors
Referee: Brendon Pickerill (New Zealand)

19 February 2022
18:45 (GMT +10)

| Reds | 23–5 | Rebels |
| Try: Tupou 14' c Wilson 49' m Campbell 80' m Con: O'Connor (1/3) 15'; Pen: O'Connor (2/2) 33', 38'; Cards: Tupou (yellow card) 23' to 33' | Report | Try: Wilkin 34' m |

Suncorp Stadium, Brisbane
Attendance: 14,168
Referee: Angus Gardner (Australia)

20 February 2022
14:00 (GMT +11)

| Brumbies | 29–23 | Force |
| Try: Wright 18' c Fainga'a 47' c Scott 58' m L. Lonergan 79' c Con: Lolesio (3/4) 20', 48', 80+1'; Pen: Lolesio (1/1) 40' | Report | Try: Pulu 43' c McIntyre 76' c Con: Prior (1/1) 45'; McIntyre (1/1) 78'; Pen: Prior (3/3) 15', 28', 40+3' |

GIO Stadium, Canberra (Note: The match between the Brumbies and the Force was meant to be held at HBF Park, Perth, however due to COVID-19 restrictions in Western Australia the venue was swapped to GIO Stadium, Canberra, with the Round 6 fixture now to be played at HBF Park, Perth.)
Attendance: 8,056
Referee: Jordan Way (Australia)

29 March 2022 (Note: The match between Moana Pasifika and the Blues was meant to be held on 18 February 2022, but due to several Moana Pasifika players testing positive for COVID-19, the match was postponed and rescheduled for 29 March 2022.)
19:05 (GMT +13)

| Moana Pasifika | 19–32 | Blues |
| Try: Tolai 37' m Pole 45' c Alosio 59' c Con: Leuila (1/2) 47'; McClutchie (1/1) 60' | Report | Try: Tua 9' m Riccitelli (2) 26' c, 33' c Romano 55' m Christie 69' m Con: Perofeta (2/5) 27', 35'; Pen: Perofeta (1/1) 75'; Cards: Laulala (red card) 56' |

Mt Smart Stadium, Auckland
Referee: Paul Williams (New Zealand)

== Round 2 ==
25 February 2022
19:05 (GMT +13)

| Highlanders | 19–34 | Crusaders |
| Try: Gilbert 9' c Con: Hunt (1/1) 10'; Pen: Hunt (4/4) 5', 14', 38', 46' | Report | Try: Reece (2) 16' c, 29' c Jordan 67' c Williams 76' c Con: Burke (2/2) 17', 30'; Hickey (2/2) 68', 77'; Pen: Burke (2/2) 40+2', 53' |

Forsyth Barr Stadium, Dunedin
Attendance: Behind closed doors
Referee: Mike Fraser (New Zealand)

25 February 2022
19:45 (GMT +11)

| Waratahs | 16–20 | Reds |
| Try: Harris 25' c Con: Donaldson (1/1) 26'; Pen: Donaldson (2/2) 38', 53'; Drop: Donaldson 63' | Report | Try: Petaia 20' c Smith 69' c Con: O'Connor (2/2) 21', 69'; Pen: O'Connor (2/2) 2', 47' |

Leichhardt Oval, Sydney
Attendance: 4,806
Referee: Damon Murphy (Australia)

26 February 2022
14:35 (GMT +11)

| Brumbies | 42–3 | Drua |
| Try: L. Lonergan 10' m Banks 13' m Ikitau 23' c Wright 47' m Valetini 55' c Mogg (2) 77' m, 80+1' m Con: Lolesio (2/6) 24', 56'; Pen: Lolesio (1/1) 3' | Report | Pen: Kerr (1/1) 37' |

GIO Stadium, Canberra
Referee: Reuben Keane (Australia)

26 February 2022
19:05 (GMT +13)

| Blues | 32–33 | Hurricanes |
| Try: Eklund (2) 23' c, 36' c Clarke 29' c Darry 68' m Con: Plummer (3/4) 24', 30', 38'; Pen: Plummer (2/2) 7', 46' | Report | Try: Rayasi (3) 14' c, 71' c, 77' m Goosen 32' c A. Savea 80' c Con: Barrett (2/2) 15', 33'; Love (2/3) 72', 80+1' |

Forsyth Barr Stadium, Dunedin
Attendance: Behind closed doors
Referee: James Doleman (New Zealand)

26 February 2022
19:45 (GMT +11)

| Rebels | 3–28 | Force |
| Pen: To'omua (1/1) 36'; Cards: Hodge (yellow card) 42' to 52', (red card) 77' | Report | Try: Anstee 27' c Godwin 43' c Ralston 80' m Con: Prior (2/2) 28', 45'; Pen: Prior (3/3) 20', 40+4', 57' |

AAMI Park, Melbourne
Referee: Nic Berry (Australia)

== Round 3 ==
4 March 2022
19:05 (GMT +13)

| Moana Pasifika | 12–33 | Crusaders |
| Try: Funaki 14' m F. Inisi 68' c Con: McClutchie (1/2) 69' | Report | Try: Dunshea 23' c Blackadder 29' c Taylor (2) 46' c, 80+2' m Pole 71' c Con: Hickey (3/3) 24', 30', 47'; Mo'unga (1/2) 72' |

Forsyth Barr Stadium, Dunedin
Attendance: Behind closed doors
Referee: James Doleman (New Zealand)

4 March 2022
18:45 (GMT +10)

| Drua | 31–26 | Rebels |
| Try: Ratave 39' c Miramira 45' m Vota 55' c Con: Muntz (1/1) 40'; Tela (1/2) 56'; Pen: Tela (4/4) 53', 64', 67', 77'; Cards: Rotuisolia (yellow card) 33' to 43' | Report | Try: Tonumaipea (2) 2' c, 59' m Hanson 33' c Nu'u 80+1' c Con: To'omua (3/4) 4', 35', 80+3' |

Sunshine Coast Stadium, Kawana Waters (Note: The match between the Drua and the Rebels was meant to be held at Suncorp Stadium, Brisbane, however due to flooding in Brisbane, the match was moved to Sunshine Coast Stadium, Kawana Waters.)
Referee: Damon Murphy (Australia)

4 March 2022
19:00 (GMT +8)

| Force | 16–29 | Reds |
| Try: Godwin 31' c Con: Strachan (1/1) 32'; Pen: Strachan (3/3) 7', 39', 63' | Report | Try: Stewart 8' c Campbell 26' m Flook 65' c McReight 71' c Con: O'Connor (3/4) 9', 67', 72'; Pen: O'Connor (1/1) 40+1'; Cards: Fotuaika (yellow card) 37' to 47'; Paisami (yellow card) 58' to 68' |

HBF Park, Perth
Referee: Graham Cooper (Australia)

5 March 2022
16:35 (GMT +13)

| Blues | 24–22 | Chiefs |
| Try: Clarke 23' c Sotutu 46' c Tele'a 75' c Con: Plummer (2/2) 24', 46'; Perofeta (1/1) 77'; Pen: Plummer (1/1) 3'; Cards: Clarke (yellow card) 49' to 59' | Report | Try: Weber (2) 7' m, 52' c Nanai-Seturo 19' c Con: Ioane (1/2) 20'; Gatland (1/1) 53'; Pen: Gatland (1/2) 69' |

Eden Park, Auckland
Attendance: 613
Referee: Ben O'Keeffe (New Zealand)

5 March 2022
19:05 (GMT +13)

| Hurricanes | 21–14 | Highlanders |
| Try: Rakete-Stones 11' c Proctor 50' c Henry 69' c Con: Barrett (3/3) 12', 51', 70' | Report | Try: Selby-Rickit 58' c Dickson 75' c Con: Banks (2/2) 59', 76' |

Sky Stadium, Wellington
Attendance: 897
Referee: Brendon Pickerill (New Zealand)

5 March 2022
19:45 (GMT +11)

| Brumbies | 27–20 | Waratahs |
| Try: Valetini 5' c Frost 36' c Simone 48' c Con: Lolesio (3/3) 7', 38', 50'; Pen: Lolesio (2/2) 13', 72' | Report | Try: Bell 58' c Harris 73' c Con: Donaldson (2/2) 59', 74'; Pen: Donaldson (2/2) 22', 33' |

GIO Stadium, Canberra
Attendance: 6,273
Referee: Nic Berry (Australia)

== Round 4 ==
11 March 2022
19:05 (GMT +13)

| Blues | 32–20 | Highlanders |
| Try: Plumtree (2) 42' c, 49' c R. Ioane 64' m Perofeta 78' c Con: Perofeta (3/4) 43', 51', 78'; Pen: Perofeta (1/1) 9'; Sullivan (1/1) 55'; Cards: Romano (yellow card) 29' to 39' | Report | Try: Penalty try 29'; Frizell 74' c Con: Hunt (1/1) 74'; Pen: Hunt (2/2) 16', 24' |

North Harbour Stadium, Albany (Note: The match between the Blues and the Highlanders was meant to be held at Semenoff Stadium, Whangārei, however due to COVID-19 restrictions, the game was moved to North Harbour Stadium, Albany.)
Attendance: Behind closed doors
Referee: Ben O'Keeffe (New Zealand)

11 March 2022
19:45 (GMT +11)

| Rebels | 17–36 | Brumbies |
| Try: Eloff 47' c Hardwick 69' c Con: To'omua (2/2) 47', 70'; Pen: To'omua (1/1) 30'; Cards: Vaihu (yellow card) 31' to 41' | Report | Try: Valetini 16' c Ikitau 26' m Wright (2) 36' m, 43' c Brown 51' m Banks 75' c Con: Lolesio (2/5) 17', 44'; R. Lonergan (1/1) 77'; Cards: White (yellow card) 57' to 67'; Kautai (yellow card) 80+3'; Slipper (yellow card) 80+5' |

AAMI Park, Melbourne
Referee: Graham Cooper (Australia)

12 March 2022
19:05 (GMT +13)

| Crusaders | 21–24 | Chiefs |
| Try: D. Havili 19' m Ennor 45' c Con: Mo'unga (1/2) 46'; Pen: Mo'unga (3/3) 7', 37', 40+4' | Report | Try: Stevenson (2) 14' c, 76' c Poihipi 80+2' c Con: Gatland (3/3) 15', 77', 80+3'; Pen: Gatland (1/1) 30' |

Orangetheory Stadium, Christchurch
Attendance: Behind closed doors
Referee: Brendon Pickerill (New Zealand)

12 March 2022
18:45 (GMT +10)

| Reds | 33–28 | Drua |
| Try: Petaia 5' m Wilson 23' c Nasser (2) 57' m, 63' m Uru 78' m Con: O'Connor (1/4) 24'; Pen: O'Connor (2/2) 40+1', 49'; Cards: Nasser (yellow card) 32' to 42'; Hoopert (yellow card) 33' to 43' | Report | Try: Ratave 67' c Tamani 69' c Habosi 72' m Con: Tela (2/3) 68', 70'; Pen: Tela (3/3) 9', 26', 46'; Cards: Tawake (yellow card) 33' to 43' |

Suncorp Stadium, Brisbane
Referee: Jordan Way (Australia)

13 March 2022
14:00 (GMT +11)

| Waratahs | 22–17 | Force |
| Try: Gamble 17' m Harrison 40' m Pen: Harrison (4/4) 21', 29', 33', 37'; Cards: Tizzano (yellow card) 80+1' | Report | Try: Mataele 9' c Lloyd 73' c Con: Strachan (1/1) 10'; Prior (1/1) 74'; Pen: Prior (1/1) 80+3'; Cards: Kaitu'u (yellow card) 39' to 49' |

Leichhardt Oval, Sydney (Note: The match between the Waratahs and the Force was meant to be held at HBF Park, Perth, however due to COVID-19 restrictions in Australia the venue was swapped to Leichhardt Oval, Sydney, with the Round 9 fixture now to be played at HBF Park, Perth.)
Attendance: 7,437
Referee: Damon Murphy (Australia)

12 April 2022 (Note: The match between the Hurricanes and Moana Pasifika was meant to be held on 12 March 2022, but due to several Hurricanes players testing positive for COVID-19, the match was postponed, and rescheduled for 12 April 2022.)
19:05 (GMT +13)

| Hurricanes | 53–12 | Moana Pasifika |
| Try: Fidow 2' m Gibson (2) 33' c, 70' m Goosen 39' c Kereru-Symes 44' c Perenara 48' c Tosi 58' c Prinsep 62' m Con: Love (4/5); Morgan (1/3) 59'; Pen: Love (1/1) 17' | Report | Try: Curry 22' m McRobbie 53' c Con: Lealiifano (1/2) 54' |

Sky Stadium, Wellington
Attendance: 3,369
Referee: Dan Waenga (New Zealand)

== Round 5 ==
18 March 2022
19:45 (GMT +11)

| Brumbies | 16–12 | Reds |
| Try: Wright 30' c Con: Lolesio (1/1) 31'; Pen: Lolesio (1/1) 14'; White (1/1) 55'; R. Lonergan (1/1) 66'; Cards: Swain (yellow card) 57' to 67' | Report | Try: O'Connor 26' c Nasser 59' m Con: O'Connor (1/2) 27' |

GIO Stadium, Canberra
Referee: Damon Murphy (Australia)

19 March 2022
14:35 (GMT +11)

| Drua | 18–20 | Force |
| Try: Habosi 33' m Lomani 45' c Con: Tela (1/2) 46'; Pen: Tela (2/2) 40+2', 56' | Report | Try: Thrush 19' c Lee-Warner 43' c Con: Prior (2/2) 20', 44'; Pen: Prior (1/1) 26'; Kuenzle (1/1) 80+4'; Cards: Callan (yellow card) 40+1' to 51' |

Leichhardt Oval, Sydney
Referee: Nic Berry (Australia)

19 March 2022 (Note: The match between Moana Pasifika and the Chiefs was meant to be held on 16 April 2022, but due to COVID-19 cancellation of matches in Round 5, the match was moved forward to 19 March 2022.)
19:05 (GMT +13)

| Moana Pasifika | 12–59 | Chiefs |
| Try: Fomai 17' c Apikotoa 67' m Con: Lealiifano (1/1) 19'; Cards: Lealiifano (yellow card) 57' to 67' | Report | Try: Gatland 10' c Burr 23' m Narawa 40' c Lowe 42' m Vaa'i 49' c Sowakula 60' c Weber 63' c Nankivell 74' c Thompson 80+1' c Con: Gatland (3/5) 11', 40+2', 50'; Ioane (4/4) 61', 64', 74', 80+2' |

Mt Smart Stadium, Auckland
Attendance: Behind closed doors
Referee: Paul Williams (New Zealand)

19 March 2022
19:45 (GMT +11)

| Waratahs | 24–19 | Rebels |
| Try: Foketi 14' c Harris 21' c Newsome 55' c Con: Harrison (3/3) 16', 22', 56'; Pen: Harrison (1/1) 48' | Report | Try: Eloff 67' c Con: C. Gordon (1/1) 68'; Pen: To'omua (4/4) 8', 31', 43', 52'; Cards: Ma'afu (yellow card) 53' to 63' |

Sydney Cricket Ground, Sydney
Attendance: 6,718
Referee: Graham Cooper (Australia)

3 April 2022 (Note: The match between the Hurricanes and Chiefs was meant to be held on 20 March 2022, but due to several positive COVID-19 tests in the Hurricanes squad, the match was postponed, and rescheduled for 3 April 2022.)
15:35 (GMT +13)

| Hurricanes | 29–30 | Chiefs |
| Try: Perenara 2' c Goosen 9' m J. Savea 67' c A. Savea 73' c Con: Barrett (3/4) 3', 70', 74'; Pen: Barrett (1/1) 25' | Report | Try: Lienert-Brown 4' c Boshier 47' c Tiatia 62' c Con: Ioane (1/1) 6'; Ah Kuoi (1/1) 48'; Gatland (1/1) 64'; Pen: Ioane (3/3) 13', 40+1', 44' |

Sky Stadium, Wellington
Attendance: 8,047
Referee: Brendon Pickerill (New Zealand)

8 April 2022 (Note: The match between the Highlanders and Moana Pasifika was meant to be held on 21 March 2022, but due to several positive COVID-19 tests in the Highlanders squad, the match was postponed, and rescheduled for 8 April 2022.)
19:05 (GMT +13)

| Highlanders | 37–17 | Moana Pasifika |
| Try: Dawai (2) 3' c, 40+1' m Makalio 32' m Marshall (2) 52' m, 77' c Fakatava 68' m Con: Hunt (2/6) 5', 79'; Pen: Hunt (1/1) 64' | Report | Try: Aumua 12' c Fainga'anuku 56' c Con: Lealiifano (2/2) 13', 57'; Pen: Lealiifano (1/1) 9'; Cards: Poloniati (yellow card) 39' to 49'; Motuga (yellow card) 66' to 76' |

Forsyth Barr Stadium, Dunedin
Referee: Mike Fraser (New Zealand)

15 April 2022 (Note: The match between the Crusaders and Blues was meant to be held on 19 March 2022, but due to several positive COVID-19 tests in both squads, the match was postponed, and rescheduled for 15 April 2022.)
19:05 (GMT +13)

| Crusaders | 23–27 | Blues |
| Try: Jordan 17' c Reece 55' m, 70' m Con: Mo'unga (1/3) 18'; Pen: Mo'unga (2/2) 43', 61'; Cards: Havili (yellow card) 39' to 49'; Barrett (red card) 46' | Report | Try: Christie 22' c Papalii 31' c Eklund 47' c Con: Perofeta (2/2) 23', 33'; Barrett (1/1) 48'; Pen: Perofeta (1/1) 9'; Barrett (1/1) 65' |

Orangetheory Stadium, Christchurch
Referee: Mike Fraser (New Zealand)

== Round 6 ==
25 March 2022
19:05 (GMT +13)

| Moana Pasifika | 24–19 (a.e.t.) | Hurricanes |
| Try: Stowers 23' c Aumua 65' m Funaki 77' c Toala 84'; Con: Lealiifano (2/3) 24', 78'; Cards: Kepu (yellow card) 19' to 29'; Aumua (yellow card) 37' to 47' | Report | Try: Barrett 6' c Moorby 56' m Fidow 68' c Con: Barrett (1/2) 6'; Love (1/1) 69'; Cards: Rayasi (yellow card) 62' to 72' |

Mt Smart Stadium, Auckland
Referee: Brendon Pickerill (New Zealand)

25 March 2022
18:45 (GMT +11)

| Rebels | 42–27 | Drua |
| Try: Philip 5' m Uelese 29' c Nu'u 49' c Eloff 71' c Orr 79' c Con: To'omua (4/5) 31', 50', 73', 80'; Pen: To'omua (3/3) 11', 18', 40+2'; Cards: Hodge (yellow card) 66' to 76' | Report | Try: Salawa Jr. 67' c Ikanivere 74' c Ravouvou 76' c Con: Tela (3/3) 68', 75', 77'; Pen: Tela (2/2) 34', 39' |

AAMI Park, Melbourne
Referee: Jordan Way (Australia)

25 March 2022
19:00 (GMT +8)

| Force | 38–39 | Brumbies |
| Try: Penalty try 28'; Godwin 31' c Strachan 38' c Mataele (2) 44' c, 61' c Con: Prior (3/3) 32', 39', 46'; Kuenzle (1/1) 61'; Pen: Prior (1/1) 6' | Report | Try: R. Lonergan 2' c Muirhead (3) 8' m, 34' c, 54' m Banks 17' m Frost 49' c Con: R. Lonergan (3/6) 3', 35', 50'; Pen: R. Lonergan (1/1) 13'; Cards: Banks (red card) 28' |

HBF Park, Perth
Referee: Angus Gardner (Australia)

26 March 2022
16:35 (GMT +13)

| Highlanders | 25–32 | Blues |
| Try: Gilbert (2) 48' m, 70' c Lienert-Brown 59' c Con: Hunt (2/3) 61', 72'; Pen: Hunt (2/2) 17' 32' | Report | Try: Clarke 10' c Barrett 39' m Sotutu 55' c Perofeta 66' c Con: Barrett (1/2) 11'; Perofeta (2/2) 56', 68'; Pen: Barrett (2/2) 2', 22' |

Forsyth Barr Stadium, Dunedin
Attendance: 7,563
Referee: Mike Fraser (New Zealand)

26 March 2022
19:05 (GMT +13)

| Chiefs | 19–34 | Crusaders |
| Try: Nankivell (2) 12' m, 39' c Ratima 71' c Con: Gatland (2/3) 40', 72' | Report | Try: Grace 8' c Jordan 18' m Reece 58' c Fainga'anuku 63' c Taylor 74' m Con: Mo'unga (3/5) 9', 59', 64'; Pen: Mo'unga (1/1) 30' |

FMG Stadium Waikato, Hamilton
Attendance: 8,789
Referee: James Doleman (New Zealand)

26 March 2022
18:45 (GMT +10)

| Reds | 32–20 | Waratahs |
| Try: McDermott 27' c Tupou 54' c McReight 65' m Campbell 68' c Con: O'Connor (2/3) 29', 55'; Henry (1/1) 69'; Pen: O'Connor (2/2) 24', 38'; Cards: Zander (red card) 31'; McDermott (yellow card) 39' to 49' | Report | Try: Grant 9' c Horton 78' c Con: Harrison (1/1) 10'; Edmed (1/1) 79'; Pen: Harrison (1/1) 32'; Edmed (1/1) 46' |

Suncorp Stadium, Brisbane
Attendance: 11,219
Referee: Nic Berry (Australia)

== Round 7 ==
1 April 2022
19:05 (GMT +12)

| Crusaders | 17–14 | Highlanders |
| Try: Newell 13' c Fainga'anuku 31' c Con: Mo'unga (2/2) 14', 32'; Pen: Mo'unga (1/1) 26'; Cards: Klein (red card) 77' | Report | Try: Makalio 7' c Gregory 19' c Con: Hunt (2/2) 9', 21' |

Orangetheory Stadium, Christchurch
Referee: Ben O'Keeffe (New Zealand)

1 April 2022
19:45 (GMT +10)

| Drua | 14–38 | Waratahs |
| Try: Habosi 23' c Nasove 55' c Con: Tela (2/2) 24', 56'; Cards: Nagusa (red card) 27'; Lomani (yellow card) 43' to 53' | Report | Try: Pietsch 16' c Gamble 28' m Porecki 37' m Holloway 44' c Hooper 52' c Nawaqanitawase 64' c Con: Edmed (4/5) 18', 45', 53', 65' |

Cbus Super Stadium, Gold Coast
Attendance: 1,295
Referee: Reuben Keane (Australia)

2 April 2022
19:05 (GMT +12)

| Blues | 46–16 | Moana Pasifika |
| Try: Evans 17' c Clarke 21' c Eklund (3) 34' m, 46' c, 66' m Heem 40' c Lam 80' m Con: Perofeta (4/7) 18', 22', 40+1', 47'; Pen: Perofeta (1/1) 11'; Cards: Clarke (red card) 52' | Report | Try: Alosio 30' c Con: Lealiifano (1/1) 31'; Pen: Lealiifano (3/3) 4', 8', 37' |

Eden Park, Auckland
Attendance: 10,268
Referee: James Doleman (New Zealand)

2 April 2022
19:45 (GMT +10)

| Reds | 21–7 | Brumbies |
| Try: McReight 43' c Daugunu 68' m Con: O'Connor (1/2) 43'; Pen: O'Connor (3/3) 14', 32', 58'; Cards: Taulima (red card) 34'; Tupou (yellow card) 76' | Report | Try: Clark 23' c Con: R. Lonergan (1/1) 25'; Cards: Valetini (yellow card) 49' to 59'; Clark (yellow card) 62' to 72' |

Suncorp Stadium, Brisbane
Attendance: 13,257
Referee: Angus Gardner (Australia)

Bye/s: Chiefs, Force, Hurricanes, Rebels

== Round 8 ==
8 April 2022
17:45 (GMT +8)

| Force | 21–22 | Rebels |
| Try: Mataele 38' m Godwin 42' m Lacey 47' m Pen: Prior (1/1) 55'; Strachan (1/1) 75'; Cards: Koteka (yellow card) 27' to 37' | Report | Try: Uelese 6' c Con: To'omua (1/1) 8'; Pen: To'omua (3/3) 13', 19', 68'; Hodge (2/2) 40+1', 71'; Cards: To'omua (yellow card) 38' to 48'; Nu'u (red card) 51' |

HBF Park, Perth
Referee: Damon Murphy (Australia)

9 April 2022
16:35 (GMT +12)

| Hurricanes | 21–24 | Crusaders |
| Try: Kirifi 11' m Moorby 30' c Con: Barrett (1/2) 31'; Pen: Barrett (3/3) 3', 40+5', 45' | Report | Try: Jordan 8' c Strange 26' m Bridge 35' m Blackadder 46' c Con: Mo'unga (2/4) 10', 47' |

Sky Stadium, Wellington
Attendance: 9,307
Referee: Brendon Pickerill (New Zealand)

9 April 2022
19:05 (GMT +12)

| Chiefs | 0–25 | Blues |
| Cards: Boshier (yellow card) 10' to 20' | Report | Try: Robinson (2) 16' c, 53' c Lam 74' m Con: Perofeta (2/3) 17', 55'; Pen: Perofeta (2/2) 8', 29'; Cards: Romano (yellow card) 36' to 46'; Nock (yellow card) 39' to 49'; Renata (yellow card) 63' to 73' |

FMG Stadium Waikato, Hamilton
Attendance: 11,611
Referee: Paul Williams (New Zealand)

9 April 2022
19:45 (GMT +10)

| Drua | 12–33 | Brumbies |
| Try: Ratave (2) 49' c, 65' m Con: Tela (1/2) 50'; Cards: Samusamuvodre (yellow card) 4' to 14' | Report | Try: Wright (2) 5' m, 80+1' c Clark 19' c Pollard 46' c McInerney 61' c Con: White (2/3) 20', 47'; R. Lonergan (2/2) 62', 80+2' |

Suncorp Stadium, Brisbane
Referee: Nic Berry (Australia)

Bye/s: Highlanders, Moana Pasifika, Reds, Waratahs

== Round 9 ==
15 April 2022
19:45 (GMT +10)

| Rebels | 32–36 | Reds |
| Try: Hardwick 31' c Hanson 39' m Philip 63' c Eloff 75' c Con: To'omua (3/4) 33', 64', 76'; Pen: To'omua (1/1) 26'; Hodge (1/2) 51' | Report | Try: Vest 17' c McDermott 28' c Creighton 36' c Tupou 67' c Flook 68' m Con: O'Connor (4/4) 19', 28', 37', 67'; Pen: O'Connor (1/1) 2'; Cards: Daugunu (yellow card) 31' to 41' |

AAMI Park, Melbourne
Referee: Damon Murphy (Australia)

16 April 2022
16:35 (GMT +12)

| Chiefs | 45–12 | Moana Pasifika |
| Try: L. Jacobson 11' c Nanai-Seturo (2) 15' c, 57' c Nankivell (2) 37' c, 51' c Reihana 79' c Con: Gatland (6/6) 12', 16', 38', 52', 58', 80'; Pen: Gatland (1/1) 27' | Report | Try: Tuitavuki 19' m Kata 44' c Con: McClutchie (1/2) 45'; Cards: Apoua (yellow card) 52' to 62' |

FMG Stadium Waikato, Hamilton
Attendance: 8,126
Referee: Ben O'Keeffe (New Zealand)

16 April 2022
19:05 (GMT +12)

| Highlanders | 21–22 | Hurricanes |
| Try: Makalio 52' m Hicks 67' c Con: Banks (1/2) 68'; Pen: Banks (3/3) 6', 33', 59'; Cards: Dickson (red card) 19' | Report | Try: Sullivan 8' c Rayasi 21' c Morgan 74' m Con: Barrett (2/3) 8', 22'; Pen: Barrett (1/1) 48' |

Forsyth Barr Stadium, Dunedin
Attendance: 7,064
Referee: Angus Mabey (New Zealand)

16 April 2022
19:45 (GMT +10)

| Force | 24–41 | Waratahs |
| Try: Pasitoa (2) 20' c, 76' m Anstee 47' m Ready 56' c Con: Prior (2/4) 21', 58'; Cards: Pasitoa (yellow card) 62' to 72' | Report | Try: Nawaqanitawase 7' c Foketi 10' c Hooper 14' c Porecki 51' c Newsome (2) 64' m, 66' m Con: Edmed (4/6) 8', 11', 15', 52'; Pen: Edmed (1/1) 5'; Cards: Vailanu (yellow card) 72'; Foketi (yellow card) 75' |

HBF Park, Perth
Attendance: 5,110
Referee: Angus Gardner (Australia)

Bye/s: Blues, Brumbies, Crusaders, Drua

== Round 10 – ANZAC & Super Round ==
22 April 2022
18:00 (GMT +10)

| Chiefs | 51–27 | Waratahs |
| Try: Taukei'aho 11' c Lowe (4) 16' m, 57' c, 68' c, 80' c Tupaea (2) 20' c, 37' m Con: Gatland (5/7) 13', 22', 58', 70', 80+1'; Pen: Gatland (2/2) 3', 32'; Cards: Tupaea (yellow card) 74' | Report | Try: Gordon (2) 28' c, 50' c Newsome 40' c Con: Harrison (1/1) 29'; Edmed (2/2) 40+1', 51'; Pen: Harrison (1/1) 7'; Edmed (1/1) 43'; Cards: Bell (red card) 2'; Roberts (yellow card) 14' to 24' |

AAMI Park, Melbourne
Attendance: 7,000
Referee: Nic Berry (Australia)

23 April 2022
17:05 (GMT +10)

| Blues | 35–18 | Drua |
| Try: Lam (2) 6' c, 65' c Darry 20' c Renata 37' c R. Ioane 51' c Con: Barrett (5/5) 6', 21', 38', 51', 66'; Cards: Tu'inukuafe (yellow card) 69' to 79' | Report | Try: Dolokoto 8' c Ratave 58' m Con: Kuruvoli (1/2) 9'; Pen: Kuruvoli (2/2) 32', 47' |

AAMI Park, Melbourne
Referee: Paul Williams (New Zealand)

23 April 2022
19:45 (GMT +10)

| Hurricanes | 30–17 | Reds |
| Try: Sullivan (2) 36' c, 70' m Lomax (2) 40+2' c, 42' m Con: Barrett (2/2) 36', 40+3'; Pen: Barrett (2/2) 47', 63'; Cards: Sullivan (yellow card) 9' to 19'; Rakete-Stones (yellow card) 26' to 36' | Report | Try: Stewart 24' c McReight 28' c Con: Creighton (2/2) 25', 30'; Pen: Creighton (1/1) 6'; Cards: Vest (yellow card) 40' to 50' |

AAMI Park, Melbourne
Referee: Angus Gardner (Australia)

24 April 2022
14:00 (GMT +10)

| Highlanders | 17–28 | Brumbies |
| Try: Umaga-Jensen 36' c Lentjes 49' c Con: Banks (2/2) 36', 50'; Pen: Banks (1/1) 68' | Report | Try: Brown 11' c L. Lonergan 19' c Lolesio 72' m Con: Lolesio (2/3) 12', 21'; Pen: Lolesio (3/3) 40+2', 44', 58' |

AAMI Park, Melbourne
Referee: Ben O'Keeffe (New Zealand)

24 April 2022
16:30 (GMT +10)

| Crusaders | 42–17 | Rebels |
| Try: Grace 20' c Blackadder (2) 42' c, 51' c Hall 63' c Williams 65' c Fainga'anuku 79' c Con: Mo'unga (5/5) 21', 43', 53', 64', 66'; Burke (1/1) 79' | Report | Try: Hodge 71' c Philip 77' c Con: Hodge (2/2) 71', 78'; Pen: Hodge (1/1) 40+1' |

AAMI Park, Melbourne
Referee: Brendon Pickerill (New Zealand)

24 May 2022 (Note: The match between Moana Pasifika and the Force was meant to be held on 22 April 2022, but due to several Force players testing positive for COVID-19, the match was postponed, and rescheduled for 24 May 2022, while the venue was changed from AAMI Park, Melbourne to Mt Smart Stadium, Auckland.)
19:05 (GMT +12)

| Moana Pasifika | 28–48 | Force |
| Try: Fainga'anuku (2) 12' c, 23' c Lindenmuth 52' c Koloamatangi 69' c Con: McClutchie (4/4) 13', 24', 53', 69'; Cards: Aumua (yellow card) 27' to 37' | Report | Try: Ready 9' m McIntyre (2) 30' c, 49' m Ralston 40+1' c Pulu 44' c Pugh 59' c Godwin 78' c Con: Prior (4/6) 31', 40+3', 46', 61'; McDonald (1/1) 79'; Pen: Prior (1/1) 57' |

Mt Smart Stadium, Auckland
Referee: James Doleman (New Zealand)

== Round 11 ==
29 April 2022
19:45 (GMT +10)

| Reds | 25–27 | Chiefs |
| Try: Wilson 31' c Flook 52' m Paisami 77' c Con: Creighton (2/3) 33', 77'; Pen: Creighton (2/2) 5', 27'; Cards: Wilson (yellow card) 46' to 56'; Campbell (yellow card) 62' to 72' | Report | Try: Ratima 40+7' c Taukei'aho 47' c Sowakula 64' c Con: Gatland (3/3) 40+9', 48', 65'; Pen: Gatland (2/2) 16', 24'; Cards: Finau (red card) 75' |

Suncorp Stadium, Brisbane
Referee: Paul Williams (New Zealand)

29 April 2022
20:00 (GMT +8)

| Force | 18–22 | Blues |
| Try: Mataele 9' m Thrush 63' m Abra 76' m Pen: Kuenzle (1/1) 4'; Cards: Medrano (yellow card) 43' to 53' | Report | Try: Darry 18' c A. Ioane 22' c Lam 30' m Con: Barrett (2/3) 20', 23'; Pen: Barrett (1/1) 13'; Cards: Darry (yellow card) 5' to 15' |

HBF Park, Perth
Referee: Angus Gardner (Australia)

30 April 2022
14:35 (GMT +12)

| Drua | 24–27 | Highlanders |
| Try: Lomani 3' c Habosi 15' c Ravouvou 23' c Con: Tela (3/3) 4', 16', 24'; Pen: Tela (1/1) 40+1' | Report | Try: Gilbert 8' c Mikaele-Tu'u 32' c Marshall 61' c Con: Hunt (3/3) 10', 33', 63'; Pen: Hunt (2/2) 20', 49' |

ANZ Stadium, Suva
Attendance: 15,102
Referee: Brendon Pickerill (New Zealand)

30 April 2022
17:05 (GMT +10)

| Waratahs | 24–21 | Crusaders |
| Try: Pietsch 2' c Nawaqanitawase 11' c Penalty try 68'; Con: Edmed (2/2) 4', 13'; Pen: Edmed (1/1) 39'; Cards: Warren-Vosayaco (yellow card) 47' to 57' | Report | Try: Penalty try 47'; Havili Talitui 59' c Newell 74' c Con: Burke (1/1) 60'; Hickey (1/1) 75'; Cards: Dalzell (red card) 67'; Matera (yellow card) 68' to 78' |

Leichhardt Oval, Sydney
Attendance: 10,293
Referee: Mike Fraser (New Zealand)

30 April 2022
19:45 (GMT +10)

| Rebels | 26–22 | Moana Pasifika |
| Try: Hanson (2) 17' c, 27' c Hodge 53' c Kellaway 62' m Con: Hodge (3/4) 18', 28', 54'; Cards: Nu'u (red card) 80' | Report | Try: Motuga 10' c Pole 49' c Tavatavanawai 77' m Con: Lealiifano (2/3) 11', 50'; Pen: Lealiifano (1/1) 35' |

AAMI Park, Melbourne
Referee: Damon Murphy (Australia)

1 May 2022
14:00 (GMT +10)

| Brumbies | 42–25 | Hurricanes |
| Try: Valetini 33' c L. Lonergan 47' m Brown 52' c Banks 57' c Creighton 78' c Con: Lolesio (4/5) 34', 54', 58', 79'; Pen: Lolesio (3/3) 7', 10', 17'; Cards: Brown (yellow card) 26' to 36' | Report | Try: Umaga-Jensen 26' c Rayasi 43' c Proctor 66' m Con: Barrett (2/3) 27', 44'; Pen: Barrett (2/2) 4', 40+2'; Cards: Sangster (yellow card) 17' to 27'; Rayasi (yellow card) 77' |

GIO Stadium, Canberra
Referee: Nic Berry (Australia)

== Round 12 ==
6 May 2022
19:05 (GMT +12)

| Blues | 71–28 | Rebels |
| Try: A. Ioane (2) 7' c, 13' c Christie 22' c Tucker 24' c Sotutu 31' c R. Ioane (3) 36' c, 51' c, 63' m Tele'a 39' m Perofeta 58' c Clarke 77' m Con: Perofeta (8/11) 9', 14', 23', 26', 33', 38', 53', 59' | Report | Try: Fa'amausili 2' c Canham 5' c Wilkin 74' c Hodge 80+1' c Con: Hodge (4/4) 2', 6', 75', 80+2' |

Eden Park, Auckland
Attendance: 11,468
Referee: Graham Cooper (Australia)

6 May 2022
19:45 (GMT +10)

| Reds | 19–27 | Highlanders |
| Try: Campbell 17' m Flook 29' c Smith 54' c Con: Creighton (2/3) 30', 55' | Report | Try: Umaga-Jensen 33' c Gregory 60' c Fakatava 66' c Con: Hunt (1/1) 34'; Banks (2/2) 61', 67'; Pen: Hunt (2/2) 40+1', 50'; Cards: Dickson (yellow card) 12' to 22'; Mikaele-Tu'u (yellow card) 17' to 27' |

Suncorp Stadium, Brisbane
Referee: Nic Berry (Australia)

7 May 2022
16:35 (GMT +12)

| Moana Pasifika | 20–26 | Waratahs |
| Try: Pole 15' c Aumua 21' c Con: Lealiifano (2/2) 16', 23'; Pen: Lealiifano (2/2) 10', 46'; Cards: Fainga'anuku (yellow card) 54' to 64' | Report | Try: Perese 28' c Porecki 38' c Nawaqanitawase 55' m Pietsch 61' c Con: Edmed (2/2) 29', 39'; Donaldson (1/2) 63' |

Mt Smart Stadium, Auckland
Attendance: 2,297
Referee: Angus Gardner (Australia)

7 May 2022
19:05 (GMT +12)

| Chiefs | 28–38 | Brumbies |
| Try: Nankivell 12' c Ratima 26' c Sowakula 58' c Ah Kuoi 79' c Con: Gatland (2/2) 12', 27'; Trask (2/2) 59', 80' | Report | Try: White 7' c Fainga'a 16' m Ikitau 43' c Pollard 72' c Con: Lolesio (3/4) 8', 45', 73'; Pen: Lolesio (4/4) 22', 30', 53', 68' |

FMG Stadium Waikato, Hamilton
Attendance: 10,821
Referee: Brendon Pickerill (New Zealand)

7 May 2022
17:45 (GMT +8)

| Force | 15–53 | Crusaders |
| Try: Strachan 16' m Lee-Warner 43' c Con: Strachan (1/2) 44'; Pen: Strachan (1/1) 6' | Report | Try: Fainga'anuku (3) 12' m, 28' m, 40' m Matera 46' c Jordan (3) 50' c, 58' c, 69' c Bell 80+1' c Con: Mo'unga (5/8) 47', 51', 60', 71', 80+2'; Pen: Mo'unga (1/1) 36' |

HBF Park, Perth
Referee: Jordan Way (Australia)

8 May 2022
15:35 (GMT +12)

| Hurricanes | 67–5 | Drua |
| Try: Moorby (3) 14' c, 33' c, 72' c Aumua 19' m Proctor (2) 28' c, 63' m Goosen (2) 42' m, 49' c Walker-Leawere 51' c Rayasi 57' m Sangster 78' m Con: Morgan (6/11) 16', 29', 34', 50', 53', 73'; Cards: Higgins (yellow card) 80+2' | Report | Try: Ratave 67' m |

Sky Stadium, Wellington
Attendance: 8,352
Referee: James Doleman (New Zealand)

== Round 13 ==
13 May 2022
19:05 (GMT +12)

| Highlanders | 61–10 | Force |
| Try: Makalio (2) 3' c, 44' c Mikaele-Tu'u (2) 6' c, 22' c Gregory 15' c Marshall 53' c Fakatava (2) 58' c, 80+1' m Harmon 78' c Con: Gilbert (8/9) 4', 7', 16', 23', 45', 54', 60', 79'; Cards: Dickson (yellow card) 32' to 42' | Report | Try: Thrush 10' m Ready 33' m Cards: Kaitu'u (yellow card) 67' to 77'; Kahui (red card) 74' |

Forsyth Barr Stadium, Dunedin
Attendance: 9,877
Referee: Ben O'Keeffe (New Zealand)

13 May 2022
19:45 (GMT +10)

| Brumbies | 26–37 | Crusaders |
| Try: Simone (2) 4' m, 47' c Fainga'a 61' c Wright 72' c Con: White (1/2) 48'; R. Lonergan (2/2) 62', 73' | Report | Try: Taylor 8' c Reece 14' c Hall 56' c Jordan 65' c Con: Mo'unga (4/4) 9', 15', 57', 66'; Pen: Mo'unga (3/3) 19', 28', 39' |

GIO Stadium, Canberra
Attendance: 8,376
Referee: Angus Gardner (Australia)

14 May 2022
14:35 (GMT +10)

| Drua | 34–19 | Moana Pasifika |
| Try: Cirikidaveta 6' c Habosi 8' c Vota (2) 32' c, 70' c Con: Tela (4/4) 6', 9', 33', 71'; Pen: Tela (2/2) 25', 68' | Report | Try: Funaki 13' c Pole 37' m Tavatavanawai 57' c Con: McClutchie (1/2) 14'; Havili (1/1) 58' |

CommBank Stadium, Parramatta
Referee: James Doleman (New Zealand)

14 May 2022
19:05 (GMT +12)

| Blues | 53–26 | Reds |
| Try: Heem (2) 14' c, 32' m Clarke (2) 18' c, 43' m Barrett 45' m Perofeta 57' c Vikena (2) 68' c, 77' c Con: Perofeta (5/8) 15', 19', 58', 69', 78'; Pen: Perofeta (1/1) 8' | Report | Try: Vunivalu 22' c Smith 39' c Campbell (2) 63' m, 71' c Con: O'Connor (3/4) 23', 40+1', 72' |

Eden Park, Auckland
Attendance: 15,239
Referee: Mike Fraser (New Zealand)

14 May 2022
19:45 (GMT +10)

| Waratahs | 18–22 | Hurricanes |
| Try: Warren-Vosayaco 19' c Pietsch 36' m Con: Edmed (1/2) 20'; Pen: Edmed (1/2) 4'; Donaldson (1/1) 68'; Cards: Ryan (red card) 77' | Report | Try: Mafileo 42' c Sullivan 60' m A. Savea 75' c Con: Barrett (2/3) 44', 76'; Pen: Barrett (1/1) 56' |

Leichhardt Oval, Sydney
Attendance: 11,381
Referee: Jordan Way (Australia)

15 May 2022
14:00 (GMT +10)

| Rebels | 30–33 | Chiefs |
| Try: C. Gordon 39' c Kellaway 47' c Hodge 66' c Con: Hodge (3/3) 40', 49', 67'; Pen: Hodge (3/3) 19', 71', 77'; Cards: Fa'amausili (yellow card) 37' to 47' | Report | Try: L. Jacobson 25' c Tiatia 31' m Taukei'aho 56' c Narawa 63' c Norris 80' c Con: Ioane (4/5) 26', 57', 64', 80+1'; Cards: L. Jacobson (yellow card) 75' |

AAMI Park, Melbourne
Referee: Reuben Keane (Australia)

== Round 14 ==
20 May 2022
19:05 (GMT +12)

| Crusaders | 61–3 | Drua |
| Try: Fainga'anuku 2' c Christie (2) 15' c, 75' c Whitelock 28' c Reece (2) 37' c, 53' m Burke 47' c Bridge 63' c Ennor 71' c Con: Burke (8/9) 4', 16', 29', 38', 49', 64', 73', 76' | Report | Pen: Tela (1/1) 8'; Cards: Ravutaumada (yellow card) 69' to 79' |

Orangetheory Stadium, Christchurch
Referee: Angus Mabey (New Zealand)

20 May 2022
19:45 (GMT +10)

| Reds | 34–22 | Moana Pasifika |
| Try: Campbell (2) 10' m, 39' m McReight 14' c Hoopert 26' c Wilson 70' c Con: O'Connor (2/4) 15', 27'; Creighton (1/1) 71'; Pen: O'Connor (1/1) 50'; Cards: McReight (yellow card) 57' to 67' | Report | Try: Funaki 4' c Tuipulotu 47' m Stowers 80' c Con: Lealiifano (1/2) 6'; McClutchie (1/1) 80+1'; Pen: Lealiifano (1/1) 30'; Cards: Stowers (yellow card) 18' to 28'; Enari (yellow card) 76' |

Suncorp Stadium, Brisbane
Referee: Graham Cooper (Australia)

21 May 2022
16:35 (GMT +12)

| Chiefs | 54–21 | Force |
| Try: Tupaea (3) 11' c, 30' c, 46' c Ross 25' c Trask 49' m Vaa'i 57' c Taukei'aho (2) 66' c, 76' c Con: Trask (1/1) 13'; Gatland (6/7) 25', 31', 47', 59', 67', 77' | Report | Try: Pulu 32' c Thrush 61' c McDonald 73' c Con: Prior (1/1) 34'; McIntyre (1/1) 63'; McDonald (1/1) 74' |

FMG Stadium Waikato, Hamilton
Attendance: 9,124
Referee: James Doleman (New Zealand)

21 May 2022
19:05 (GMT +12)

| Hurricanes | 45–22 | Rebels |
| Try: J. Savea 3' m Proctor 10' c Gibson 19' c Blackwell 35' c Maile 56' c Barrett 66' c Morgan 74' m Con: Barrett (5/7) 11', 20', 36', 57', 67' | Report | Try: Ripley (3) 23' m, 50' c, 77' c Con: To'omua (2/3) 52', 79'; Pen: To'omua (1/1) 7' |

Sky Stadium, Wellington
Attendance: 7,001
Referee: Paul Williams (New Zealand)

21 May 2022
19:45 (GMT +10)

| Brumbies | 19–21 | Blues |
| Try: Samu 3' c Fainga'a 54' m Pollard 77' c Con: Lolesio (2/3) 4', 79'; Cards: Fainga'a (yellow card) 28' to 38'; Swain (yellow card) 36' to 46' | Report | Try: Barrett 40+2' m Tu'inukuafe 67' c Con: Perofeta (1/2) 68'; Pen: Perofeta (2/3) 17', 75'; Drop: Barrett 80+1' |

GIO Stadium, Canberra
Referee: Damon Murphy (Australia)

22 May 2022
15:35 (GMT +12)

| Highlanders | 20–32 | Waratahs |
| Try: Dickson 3' c Gregory 56' m Coombes-Fabling 80+2' m Con: Gilbert (1/1) 4'; Pen: Banks (1/1) 50'; Cards: Gilbert (red card) 29' | Report | Try: Harris 11' c Hooper 37' c Nawaqanitawase 32' m Edmed 77' c Con: Edmed (3/4) 12', 38', 78'; Pen: Edmed (2/2) 65', 69'; Cards: Ryan (yellow card) 51' to 61' |

Forsyth Barr Stadium, Dunedin
Attendance: 11,432
Referee: Nic Berry (Australia)

== Round 15 ==
27 May 2022
19:05 (GMT +12)

| Crusaders | 28–15 | Reds |
| Try: Burke 11' c Jordan 15' c McAlister 37' c Christie 67' c Con: Burke (4/4) 12', 16', 38', 68'; Cards: Matera (yellow card) 55' to 65' | Report | Try: Asiata 57' c Wilson 72' m Con: Creighton (1/2) 58'; Pen: Creighton (1/1) 26' |

Orangetheory Stadium, Christchurch
Attendance: 15,500
Referee: Ben O'Keeffe (New Zealand)

28 May 2022
15:00 (GMT +12)

| Drua | 34–35 | Chiefs |
| Try: Vota (2) 31' c, 75' c Ravouvou 70' c Sauvoli 79' c Con: Tela (4/4) 32', 71', 76', 79'; Pen: Tela (2/2) 45', 52' | Report | Try: Ta'avao 14' c Gatland 21' c Narawa (2) 40' c, 53' c Penalty try 66'; Con: Gatland (4/4) 15', 22', 40+2', 54' |

Churchill Park, Lautoka (Note: The match between the Drua and the Chiefs was meant to be held at Cbus Super Stadium, Gold Coast, however due to the relaxation of COVID-19 restrictions the game was able to be hosted in Fiji, with Churchill Park, Lautoka selected as the new venue.)
Attendance: 11,000
Referee: Brendon Pickerill (New Zealand)

28 May 2022
19:05 (GMT +12)

| Moana Pasifika | 32–22 | Brumbies |
| Try: Havili 21' m Apikotoa 27' c Penalty try 40'; L. Inisi 76' c Con: Lealiifano (2/2) 28', 78'; Pen: Lealiifano (2/2) 53', 63'; Cards: Kepu (red card) 10' | Report | Try: McInerney 13' c L. Lonergan 57' c Samu 80+3' m Con: Lolesio (2/2) 14', 59'; Drop: Lolesio 48'; Cards: McInerney (yellow card) 39' to 49'; Brown (yellow card) 40' to 50' |

Mt Smart Stadium, Auckland
Referee: Mike Fraser (New Zealand)

28 May 2022
19:45 (GMT +10)

| Waratahs | 17–20 | Blues |
| Try: Nawaqanitawase (2) 50' c, 57' c Con: Edmed (2/2) 52', 58'; Pen: Edmed (1/1) 79' | Report | Try: Suafoa 66' c Romano 75' c Con: Sullivan (2/2) 67', 76'; Pen: McKenzie (1/2) 37'; Drop: Sullivan 80+2'; Cards: Choat (yellow card) 28' to 38'; A. Ioane (yellow card) 29' to 39' |

Leichhardt Oval, Sydney
Attendance: 14,681
Referee: Paul Williams (New Zealand)

28 May 2022
20:00 (GMT +8)

| Force | 27–22 | Hurricanes |
| Try: Medrano 39' c Ready 45' c Ralston 74' c Con: Prior (2/2) 40+1', 47'; McDonald (1/1) 76'; Pen: Prior (2/2) 7', 18'; Cards: Thrush (yellow card) 8' to 18' | Report | Try: Moorby (2) 21' c, 27' m Iose 35' m Rayasi 58' m Con: Morgan (1/4) 22'; Cards: Rayasi (yellow card) 41' to 51' |

HBF Park, Perth
Referee: Angus Gardner (Australia)

29 May 2022
14:00 (GMT +10)

| Rebels | 31–30 | Highlanders |
| Try: Uelese 24' c G. Vaihu 35' c Jooste 53' c Ripley 57' m Tonumaipea 74' m Con: To'omua (3/5) 25', 36', 54' | Report | Try: Van Vugt 3' c Dickson 20' m Fakatava 61' m Paea 66' c Con: Banks (1/2) 3'; Koroi (1/2) 68'; Pen: Banks (2/2) 29', 39' |

AAMI Park, Melbourne
Referee: Jordan Way (Australia)

== See also ==
- 2022 Super Rugby Pacific season
