= 2022 Super Rugby Pacific season =

Men's rugby union club competition

- Dates: 18 February – 18 June 2022
- Countries: Australia (5 teams); Fiji (1 team); New Zealand (5 teams); Pacific Islands (1 team)
- Tournament format(s): Round-robin and knockout
- Champions: Crusaders (11th title)
- Matches played: 91
- Tries scored: 626 (6.88 per match)
- Top point scorer(s): (New Zealand) Stephen Perofeta, Blues (129)
- Top try scorer(s): (New Zealand) Leicester Fainga'anuku, Crusaders (New Zealand) Will Jordan, Crusaders (New Zealand) Sevu Reece, Crusaders (all 10)
- Official website: Official site

The 2022 Super Rugby Pacific season (known as Harvey Norman Super Rugby Pacific in Australia and DHL Super Rugby Pacific in New Zealand) is the 27th season of Super Rugby, an annual rugby union competition organised by SANZAAR between teams from Australia, Fiji, New Zealand, Samoa and Tonga. Due to the COVID-19 pandemic, the previous seasons were replaced with Super Rugby Unlocked, Super Rugby Aotearoa and Super Rugby AU in 2020, and Super Rugby Aotearoa, Super Rugby AU, and Super Rugby Trans-Tasman in 2021. The 2022 edition will revert to a 12-team competition, with a single pool replacing the geographical conference system, as well as introducing a new name for the reformatted competition. The season is expected to run from 18 February, with the final to be played on 18 June - culminating before the start of the mid-year international window.

With the exclusion or withdrawal of the Argentine Jaguares, the Japanese Sunwolves, and the South African Bulls, Lions, Sharks and Stormers sides at the conclusion of the 2020 Super Rugby season, three new teams were announced to make up the 12 team tournament. The Fiji Rugby Union's domestic team, the Fijian Drua, having previously competed in the Australian National Rugby Championship from 2017 to 2019, were announced as one addition to the competition. The newly created Moana Pasifika franchise, representing players from Samoa and Tonga and other Pacific Islands, also successfully put forth a bid to join the competition. The Force also returned to Super Rugby, following their exclusion at the end of the 2017 Super Rugby season and following on from their inclusion in Super Rugby AU and Super Rugby Trans-Tasman in both 2020 and 2021.

The competition was again affected by the COVID-19 pandemic, with the competitions fixtures being revised in December 2021, due to border restriction in New Zealand. Then in January, the Force announced their Round 1 and Round 4 home matches would be swapped to away matches, due to border restrictions in Western Australia. In February, it was announced that the New Zealand sides (and Moana Pasifika) would enter a bio-bubble in Queenstown, New Zealand due to the threat of COVID-19 with all NZ-based matches being played at Forsyth Barr Stadium, Dunedin or Wakatipu Rugby Club, Queenstown. Despite this, it was announced that the Round 1 match between Moana Pasifika and the Blues would be postponed due to COVID-19 cases within the Moana Pasifika squad.

== Competition format ==
The 12 participating teams were not divided into geographical conferences, instead playing 14 regular season games: the 12 teams facing each other once in a home-and-away format for 11 games, and the remaining 3 games played with an emphasis on derby matches; with the Fijian Drua associated with the Australian sides and Moana Pasifika with the New Zealand sides, given they were based there. It was thought likely that the Drua and Moana Pasifika would also develop a rivalry, both being Pacific Island teams.

The top eight teams at the conclusion of the regular season qualified for the play-offs. For the quarterfinals, the first-ranked team played the eighth-ranked team, the second-ranked team played the seventh-ranked, the third-ranked played the sixth-ranked and the fourth-ranked team played the fifth-ranked. The quarterfinal winners progressed to the Semifinal, and the winners of the semifinals advanced to the final. The higher ranked team hosted each playoff match.

== Standings ==
2022 Super Rugby Pacific standings
| Pos | Team | Pld | W | D | L | PF | PA | PD | TF | TA | TB | LB | Pts | Qualification |
|---|---|---|---|---|---|---|---|---|---|---|---|---|---|---|
| 1 | Blues (RU) | 14 | 13 | 0 | 1 | 472 | 284 | +188 | 64 | 38 | 5 | 1 | 58 | Quarter-finals |
| 2 | Crusaders (C) | 14 | 11 | 0 | 3 | 470 | 268 | +202 | 64 | 33 | 5 | 3 | 52 | Quarter-finals |
| 3 | Chiefs | 14 | 10 | 0 | 4 | 453 | 348 | +105 | 62 | 42 | 4 | 1 | 45 | Quarter-finals |
| 4 | Brumbies | 14 | 10 | 0 | 4 | 404 | 306 | +98 | 55 | 36 | 3 | 1 | 44 | Quarter-finals |
| 5 | Hurricanes | 14 | 8 | 0 | 6 | 441 | 330 | +111 | 64 | 42 | 3 | 4 | 39 | Quarter-finals |
| 6 | Waratahs | 14 | 8 | 0 | 6 | 365 | 317 | +48 | 45 | 39 | 2 | 4 | 38 | Quarter-finals |
| 7 | Reds | 14 | 8 | 0 | 6 | 342 | 327 | +15 | 46 | 39 | 1 | 2 | 35 | Quarter-finals |
| 8 | Highlanders | 14 | 4 | 0 | 10 | 348 | 345 | +3 | 43 | 45 | 2 | 5 | 23 | Quarter-finals |
| 9 | Force | 14 | 4 | 0 | 10 | 326 | 443 | −117 | 42 | 61 | 2 | 5 | 23 | |
| 10 | Rebels | 14 | 4 | 0 | 10 | 320 | 469 | −149 | 39 | 65 | 0 | 4 | 20 | |
| 11 | Drua | 14 | 2 | 0 | 12 | 261 | 518 | −257 | 30 | 75 | 0 | 4 | 12 | |
| 12 | Moana Pasifika | 14 | 2 | 0 | 12 | 267 | 514 | −247 | 37 | 76 | 0 | 2 | 10 | |

Source: Super Rugby
(C) Champions; (RU) Runners-up;

Competition rules
Qualification:'
Eight teams will qualify to the finals, with their final positions in the overall log determining their seedings in the quarter-finals. The top eight teams for the quarter-finals will be seeded in order of log points gained during the group stages.
In the quarter-finals, the teams seeded #1 to #4 will host the first round of the finals, with the highest-seeded conference winner (Team #1) hosting the eighth-seeded team (Team #8) in quarter-final 1, the second-seeded conference winner (Team #2) hosting the seventh-seeded team (Team #7) in quarter-final 2, the third-seeded team (Team #3) hosting the sixth-seeded team (Team #6) in quarter-final 3 and the fourth-seeded team (Team #4) hosting the fifth-seed team (Team #5) in quarter-final 4.
The quarter-final winners will progress to the semi-finals, where the winners of quarter-finals 1 and 4 will play each other, as well as the winners of quarter-finals 2 and 3, each match hosted by the higher-seeded team.
The winner of the semi-finals will progress to the Final, again to be held at the venue of the highest-seeded team.
Tournament points breakdown:
* 4 tournament points for a win
* 2 tournament points for a draw
* 1 tournament bonus point for a loss by seven points or less
* 1 tournament bonus point for scoring at least three tries more than the opponent in a match
Classification:
Teams standings are calculated as follows:
* Tournament points
* Number of games won
* Overall points difference
* Number of tries scored
* Overall try difference
* Coin toss

=== Round-by-round ===
The table below shows each team's progression throughout the season. For each round, their cumulative points total is shown with the overall log position in brackets:

Team Progression
| Team | R1 | R2 | R3 | R4 | R5 | R6 | RM | R7 | R8 | RM | R9 | R10 | R11 | R12 | R13 | R14 | RM | R15 | QF | SF | Final |
|---|---|---|---|---|---|---|---|---|---|---|---|---|---|---|---|---|---|---|---|---|---|
| Blues | 0 (7th) | 1 (8th) | 5 (7th) | 9 (5th) | 9 (7th) | 13 (6th) | 17 (4th) | 22 (4th) | 27 (2nd) | 27 (2nd) | 31 (1st) | 36 (1st) | 40 (1st) | 45 (1st) | 50 (1st) | 54 (1st) | 54 (1st) | 58 (1st) | Won | Won | Lost |
| Brumbies | 4 (5th) | 9 (1st) | 13 (2nd) | 18 (1st) | 22 (1st) | 26 (1st) | 26 (1st) | 26 (1st) | 31 (1st) | 31 (1st) | 31 (2nd) | 35 (2nd) | 39 (2nd) | 43 (2nd) | 43 (2nd) | 44 (3rd) | 44 (3rd) | 44 (4th) | Won | Lost | DNQ |
| Chiefs | 4 (4th) | 4 (6th) | 5 (8th) | 9 (6th) | 14 (5th) | 14 (5th) | 14 (6th) | 18 (6th) | 18 (6th) | 18 (6th) | 23 (6th) | 28 (5th) | 32 (4th) | 32 (4th) | 36 (4th) | 41 (4th) | 41 (4th) | 45 (3rd) | Won | Lost | DNQ |
| Crusaders | 4 (3rd) | 9 (2nd) | 14 (1st) | 15 (3rd) | 15 (4th) | 19 (3rd) | 19 (3rd) | 23 (3rd) | 27 (3rd) | 27 (3rd) | 28 (4th) | 33 (3rd) | 34 (3rd) | 39 (3rd) | 43 (3rd) | 48 (2nd) | 48 (2nd) | 52 (2nd) | Won | Won | Won |
| Drua | 0 (12th) | 0 (12th) | 4 (9th) | 5 (9th) | 6 (9th) | 6 (10th) | 6 (10th) | 6 (10th) | 6 (11th) | 6 (11th) | 6 (11th) | 6 (11th) | 7 (11th) | 7 (11th) | 11 (11th) | 11 (11th) | 11 (11th) | 12 (11th) | DNQ | DNQ | DNQ |
| Force | 1 (6th) | 6 (5th) | 6 (6th) | 7 (8th) | 11 (6th) | 12 (7th) | 12 (7th) | 12 (7th) | 13 (7th) | 13 (8th) | 13 (8th) | 13 (8th) | 14 (9th) | 14 (10th) | 14 (10th) | 14 (10th) | 19 (9th) | 23 (9th) | DNQ | DNQ | DNQ |
| Highlanders | 0 (10th) | 0 (10th) | 1 (10th) | 1 (10th) | 1 (11th) | 2 (12th) | 2 (12th) | 3 (12th) | 8 (10th) | 8 (10th) | 9 (10th) | 9 (10th) | 13 (10th) | 17 (8th) | 22 (8th) | 22 (8th) | 22 (8th) | 23 (8th) | Lost | DNQ | DNQ |
| Hurricanes | 0 (9th) | 4 (7th) | 8 (4th) | 8 (7th) | 8 (8th) | 9 (8th) | 9 (8th) | 10 (8th) | 11 (8th) | 16 (7th) | 20 (7th) | 24 (6th) | 24 (7th) | 29 (7th) | 33 (5th) | 38 (5th) | 38 (5th) | 39 (5th) | Lost | DNQ | DNQ |
| Moana Pasifika | 0 (8th) | 0 (9th) | 0 (12th) | 0 (12th) | 0 (12th) | 4 (11th) | 4 (11th) | 4 (11th) | 4 (12th) | 4 (12th) | 4 (12th) | 4 (12th) | 5 (12th) | 6 (12th) | 6 (12th) | 6 (12th) | 6 (12th) | 10 (12th) | DNQ | DNQ | DNQ |
| Rebels | 0 (11th) | 0 (11th) | 1 (11th) | 1 (11th) | 2 (10th) | 6 (9th) | 6 (9th) | 6 (9th) | 10 (9th) | 10 (9th) | 11 (9th) | 11 (9th) | 15 (8th) | 15 (9th) | 16 (9th) | 16 (9th) | 16 (10th) | 20 (10th) | DNQ | DNQ | DNQ |
| Reds | 4 (2nd) | 8 (3rd) | 13 (3rd) | 17 (2nd) | 18 (2nd) | 22 (2nd) | 22 (2nd) | 26 (2nd) | 26 (4th) | 26 (4th) | 30 (3rd) | 30 (4th) | 31 (5th) | 31 (6th) | 31 (7th) | 35 (7th) | 35 (7th) | 35 (7th) | Lost | DNQ | DNQ |
| Waratahs | 5 (1st) | 6 (4th) | 7 (5th) | 11 (4th) | 15 (3rd) | 15 (4th) | 15 (5th) | 20 (5th) | 20 (5th) | 20 (5th) | 24 (5th) | 24 (7th) | 28 (6th) | 32 (5th) | 33 (6th) | 37 (6th) | 37 (6th) | 38 (6th) | Lost | DNQ | DNQ |
| Key: | win | draw | loss | bye | Posp. | No match | RM = Rescheduled match | | | | | | | | | | | | | | |

== Matches ==
The fixtures for the 2022 Super Rugby Pacific competition were released on 15 November 2021. On 23 December 2021, a revised draw was announced due to complications surrounding the COVID-19 pandemic.

| Home \ Away | BLU | BRU | CHI | CRU | DRU | FOR | HIG | HUR | MOA | REB | RED | WAR |
|---|---|---|---|---|---|---|---|---|---|---|---|---|
| Blues | — | — | 24–22 | — | 35–18 | — | 32–20 | 32–33 | 46–16 | 71–28 | 53–26 | — |
| Brumbies | 19–21 | — | — | 26–37 | 42–3 | 29–23 | — | 42–25 | — | — | 16–12 | 27–20 |
| Chiefs | 0–25 | 28–38 | — | 19–34 | — | 54–21 | 26–16 | — | 45–12 | — | — | 51–27 |
| Crusaders | 23–27 | — | 21–24 | — | 61–3 | — | 17–14 | 42–32 | — | 42–17 | 28–15 | — |
| Drua | — | 12–33 | 34–35 | — | — | 18–20 | 24–27 | — | 34–19 | 31–26 | — | 14–38 |
| Force | 18–22 | 38–39 | — | 15–53 | — | — | — | 27–22 | — | 21–22 | 16–29 | 24–41 |
| Highlanders | 25–32 | 17–28 | — | 19–34 | — | 61–10 | — | 21–22 | 37–17 | — | — | 20–32 |
| Hurricanes | — | — | 29–30 | 21–24 | 67–5 | — | 21–14 | — | 53–12 | 45–22 | 30–17 | — |
| Moana Pasifika | 19–32 | 32–22 | 12–59 | 12–33 | — | 28–48 | — | 24–19 | — | — | — | 20–26 |
| Rebels | — | 17–36 | 30–33 | — | 42–27 | 3–28 | 31–30 | — | 26–22 | — | 32–36 | — |
| Reds | — | 21–7 | 25–27 | — | 33–28 | — | 19–27 | — | 34–22 | 23–5 | — | 32–20 |
| Waratahs | 17–20 | — | — | 24–21 | 40–10 | 22–17 | — | 18–22 | — | 24–19 | 16–20 | — |

First match(es) will be played: 18 February 2022. Source: https://sanzarrugby.com/superrugby/fixtures/
Legend: Blue = home team win; Yellow = draw; Red = away team win.

== Finals ==
Quarter-finals
4 June – Auckland
Blues | 35
Highlanders | 6
4 June – Canberra
Brumbies | 35
Hurricanes | 25
3 June – Christchurch
Crusaders | 37
Reds | 15
4 June – Hamilton
Chiefs | 39
Waratahs | 15

Semi-finals
11 June – Auckland
Blues | 20
Brumbies | 19
10 June – Christchurch
Crusaders | 20
Chiefs | 7

Final
18 June – Auckland
Blues | 7
Crusaders | 21

=== Quarter-finals ===
3 June 2022
19:05 (GMT +12)

| Crusaders | 37–15 | Reds |
| Try: Jordan 15' c Mo'unga 57' c Reece 65' c Williams 74' c Con: Mo'unga (4/4) 16', 58', 66', 76'; Pen: Mo'unga (3/3) 10', 32', 39' | Report | Try: Vunivalu 25' m Daugunu 43' c Con: Creighton (1/2) 44'; Pen: Creighton (1/1) 6' |

Orangetheory Stadium, Christchurch
Referee: Brendon Pickerill (New Zealand)

4 June 2022
16:35 (GMT +12)

| Chiefs | 39–15 | Waratahs |
| Try: Weber (2) 6' c, 64' m L. Jacobson 22' c Nankivell 34' c Sowakula 71' c Con: Gatland (4/5) 7', 23', 36', 72'; Pen: Gatland (2/2) 3', 40+1' | Report | Try: Pietsch 8' c Harris 46' m Con: Edmed (1/2) 10'; Pen: Edmed (1/1) 19' |

FMG Stadium Waikato, Hamilton
Attendance: 10,121
Referee: Nic Berry (Australia)

4 June 2022
19:05 (GMT +12)

| Blues | 35–6 | Highlanders |
| Try: A. Ioane 31' c Barrett (2) 35' c, 48' c Lam 59' c Tuivasa-Sheck 69' c Con: Perofeta (5/5) 33', 37', 49', 60', 70' | Report | Pen: Banks (2/2) 5', 30'; Cards: Makalio (red card) 22' |

Eden Park, Auckland
Attendance: 18,491
Referee: Angus Gardner (Australia)

4 June 2022
19:45 (GMT +10)

| Brumbies | 35–25 | Hurricanes |
| Try: Fainga'a 25' m Simone 31' c Banks 64' c Wright 74' c Con: White (1/1) 33'; Lolesio (2/3) 66', 76'; Pen: Lolesio (3/3) 8', 48', 61'; Cards: Ikitau (red card) 23' | Report | Try: Moorby (2) 17' m, 39' m Pen: Barrett (5/5) 4', 11', 23', 35', 42'; Cards: Franks (yellow card) 25' to 35'; Rayasi (yellow card) 73' |

GIO Stadium, Canberra
Referee: Paul Williams (New Zealand)

=== Semi-finals ===
10 June 2022
19:05 (GMT +12)

| Crusaders | 20–7 | Chiefs |
| Try: Grace (2) 23' c, 35' c Con: Mo'unga (2/2) 25', 37'; Pen: Mo'unga (2/3) 6', 9'; Cards: Matera (yellow card) 20' to 30'; Matera (red card) 32' | Report | Try: Ta'avao 27' c Con: Gatland (1/1) 28'; Cards: Tupaea (yellow card) 8' to 18' |

Orangetheory Stadium, Christchurch
Attendance: 15,000
Referee: Nic Berry (Australia)

11 June 2022
19:05 (GMT +12)

| Blues | 20–19 | Brumbies |
| Try: Sotutu 23' c Tele'a 34' c Con: Perofeta (2/2) 24', 36'; Pen: Perofeta (2/2) 10', 21'; Cards: Eklund (yellow card) 52' to 62'; Choat (yellow card) 75' | Report | Try: Simone 3' c L. Lonergan (2) 59' m, 76' c Con: Lolesio (2/3) 4', 78' |

Eden Park, Auckland
Attendance: 21,024
Referee: Ben O'Keeffe (New Zealand)

=== Final ===
18 June 2022
19:05 (GMT +12)

| Blues | 7–21 | Crusaders |
| Try: Christie 59' c Con: Perofeta (1/1) 60' | Report; Match Summary | Try: Hall 40' c Reece 76' m Con: Mo'unga (1/2) 40+1'; Pen: Mo'unga (2/3) 30', 46'; Drop: Mo'unga 13' |

Eden Park, Auckland
Attendance: 36,608
Referee: Ben O'Keeffe (New Zealand)

== Statistics ==
As of 11 June 2022

=== Leading point scorers ===
| No. | Player | Team | Points | Average | Details |
|---|---|---|---|---|---|
| 1 | (New Zealand) Stephen Perofeta | (New Zealand) Blues | 129 | 9.21 | 4 T, 38 C, 10 P, 0 D |
| 2 | (New Zealand) Richie Mo'unga | (New Zealand) Crusaders | 126 | 10.50 | 1 T, 32 C, 18 P, 1 D |
| 3 | (New Zealand) Bryn Gatland | (New Zealand) Chiefs | 122 | 8.13 | 2 T, 40 C, 10 P, 0 D |
| 4 | (New Zealand) Jordie Barrett | (New Zealand) Hurricanes | 118 | 9.83 | 3 T, 26 C, 17 P, 0 D |
| 4 | (Australia) Noah Lolesio | (Australia) Brumbies | 118 | 9.83 | 1 T, 28 C, 18 P, 1 D |
| 6 | (Fiji) Teti Tela | (Fiji) Drua | 93 | 9.30 | 0 T, 21 C, 17 P, 0 D |
| 7 | (Australia) James O'Connor | (Australia) Reds | 87 | 8.70 | 1 T, 21 C, 13 P, 0 D |
| 8 | (Australia) Matt To'omua | (Australia) Rebels | 78 | 7.09 | 0 T, 18 C, 14 P, 0 D |
| 9 | (Australia) Tane Edmed | (Australia) Waratahs | 76 | 6.33 | 1 T, 22 C, 9 P, 0 D |
| 10 | (Australia) Ian Prior | (Australia) Force | 75 | 5.36 | 0 T, 18 C, 13 P, 0 D |

Source: Points

=== Leading try scorers ===
| No. | Player | Team | Tries | Average |
|---|---|---|---|---|
| 1 | (New Zealand) Leicester Fainga'anuku | (New Zealand) Crusaders | 10 | 0.59 |
| 1 | (New Zealand) Will Jordan | (New Zealand) Crusaders | 10 | 0.67 |
| 1 | (New Zealand) Sevu Reece | (New Zealand) Crusaders | 10 | 0.67 |
| 4 | (New Zealand) Josh Moorby | (New Zealand) Hurricanes | 9 | 0.90 |
| 4 | (Australia) Tom Wright | (Australia) Brumbies | 9 | 0.56 |
| 6 | (Australia) Jock Campbell | (Australia) Reds | 8 | 0.62 |
| 7 | (New Zealand) Caleb Clarke | (New Zealand) Blues | 7 | 0.78 |
| 7 | (Australia) Lachlan Lonergan | (Australia) Brumbies | 7 | 0.64 |
| 7 | (New Zealand) Alex Nankivell | (New Zealand) Chiefs | 7 | 0.50 |
| 7 | (Australia) Mark Nawaqanitawase | (Australia) Waratahs | 7 | 0.58 |
| 7 | (New Zealand) Salesi Rayasi | (New Zealand) Hurricanes | 7 | 0.70 |

Source: Tries

=== Discipline ===
| Player | Team | Red | Yellow | Round (vs. Opponent) |
|---|---|---|---|---|
| (New Zealand) Ray Nu'u | (Australia) Rebels | 2 | 0 | Round 8 (vs. Force); Round 11 (vs. Moana Pasifika) |
| (Argentina) Pablo Matera | (New Zealand) Crusaders | 1 | 3 | Semi-final (vs. Chiefs); Round 11 (vs. Waratahs); Round 15 (vs. Reds); Semi-final (vs. Chiefs) |
| (New Zealand) Josh Dickson | (New Zealand) Highlanders | 1 | 2 | Round 9 (vs. Hurricanes); Round 12 (vs. Reds); Round 13 (vs. Force) |
| (Australia) Reece Hodge | (Australia) Rebels | 1 | 2 | Round 2 (vs. Force); Round 2 (vs. Force); Round 6 (vs. Drua) |
| (New Zealand) Caleb Clarke | (New Zealand) Blues | 1 | 1 | Round 7 (vs. Moana Pasifika); Round 3 (vs. Chiefs) |
| (Australia) Sekope Kepu | (New Zealand) Moana Pasifika | 1 | 1 | Round 15 (vs. Brumbies); Round 6 (vs. Hurricanes) |
| (Australia) Paddy Ryan | (Australia) Waratahs | 1 | 1 | Round 13 (vs. Hurricanes); Round 14 (vs. Highlanders) |
| (Australia) Tom Banks | (Australia) Brumbies | 1 | 0 | Round 6 (vs. Force) |
| (New Zealand) Scott Barrett | (New Zealand) Crusaders | 1 | 0 | Round 5 (vs. Blues) |
| (Australia) Angus Bell | (Australia) Waratahs | 1 | 0 | Round 10 (vs. Chiefs) |
| (New Zealand) Hamish Dalzell | (New Zealand) Crusaders | 1 | 0 | Round 11 (vs. Waratahs) |
| (New Zealand) Samipeni Finau | (New Zealand) Chiefs | 1 | 0 | Round 11 (vs. Reds) |
| (New Zealand) Sam Gilbert | (New Zealand) Highlanders | 1 | 0 | Round 14 (vs. Waratahs) |
| (Australia) Len Ikitau | (Australia) Brumbies | 1 | 0 | Quarter-final (vs. Hurricanes) |
| (New Zealand) Richard Kahui | (Australia) Force | 1 | 0 | Round 13 (vs. Highlanders) |
| (New Zealand) Shilo Klein | (New Zealand) Crusaders | 1 | 0 | Round 7 (vs. Highlanders) |
| (New Zealand) Nepo Laulala | (New Zealand) Blues | 1 | 0 | Round 1 (vs. Moana Pasifika) |
| (New Zealand) Andrew Makalio | (New Zealand) Highlanders | 1 | 0 | Quarter-final (vs. Blues) |
| (Fiji) Nemani Nagusa | (Fiji) Drua | 1 | 0 | Round 7 (vs. Waratahs) |
| (Australia) Tuaina Taii Tualima | (Australia) Reds | 1 | 0 | Round 7 (vs. Brumbies) |
| (Australia) Dane Zander | (Australia) Reds | 1 | 0 | Round 6 (vs. Waratahs) |
| (New Zealand) Salesi Rayasi | (New Zealand) Hurricanes | 0 | 4 | Round 6 (vs. Moana Pasifika); Round 11 (vs. Brumbies); Round 15 (vs. Force); Quarter-final (vs. Brumbies) |
| (New Zealand) Levi Aumua | (New Zealand) Moana Pasifika | 0 | 2 | Round 6 (vs. Hurricanes); Round 10 (vs. Force) |
| (New Zealand) Jahrome Brown | (Australia) Brumbies | 0 | 2 | Round 11 (vs. Hurricanes); Round 15 (vs. Moana Pasifika) |
| (New Zealand) Adrian Choat | (New Zealand) Blues | 0 | 2 | Round 15 (vs. Waratahs); Semi-final (vs. Brumbies) |
| (Australia) Feleti Kaitu'u | (Australia) Force | 0 | 2 | Round 1 (vs. Waratahs); Round 13 (vs. Highlanders) |
| (New Zealand) Luke Romano | (New Zealand) Blues | 0 | 2 | Round 4 (vs. Highlanders); Round 8 (vs. Chiefs) |
| (Australia) Darcy Swain | (Australia) Brumbies | 0 | 2 | Round 5 (vs. Reds); Round 14 (vs. Blues) |
| (New Zealand) Quinn Tupaea | (New Zealand) Chiefs | 0 | 2 | Round 10 (vs. Waratahs); Semi-final (vs. Crusaders) |
| (Australia) Taniela Tupou | (Australia) Reds | 0 | 2 | Round 1 (vs. Rebels); Round 7 (vs. Brumbies) |
| (New Zealand) Chris Apoua | (New Zealand) Moana Pasifika | 0 | 1 | Round 9 (vs. Chiefs) |
| (New Zealand) Kaylum Boshier | (New Zealand) Chiefs | 0 | 1 | Round 8 (vs. Blues) |
| (New Zealand) Fergus Burke | (New Zealand) Crusaders | 0 | 1 | Round 1 (vs. Hurricanes) |
| (Australia) Ollie Callan | (Australia) Force | 0 | 1 | Round 5 (vs. Drua) |
| (Australia) Jock Campbell | (Australia) Reds | 0 | 1 | Round 11 (vs. Chiefs) |
| (Australia) Cam Clark | (Australia) Brumbies | 0 | 1 | Round 7 (vs. Reds) |
| (New Zealand) Sam Darry | (New Zealand) Blues | 0 | 1 | Round 11 (vs. Force) |
| (Australia) Filipo Daugunu | (Australia) Reds | 0 | 1 | Round 9 (vs. Rebels) |
| (New Zealand) Kurt Eklund | (New Zealand) Blues | 0 | 1 | Semi-final (vs. Brumbies) |
| (New Zealand) Ere Enari | (New Zealand) Moana Pasifika | 0 | 1 | Round 14 (vs. Reds) |
| (Australia) Pone Fa'amausili | (Australia) Rebels | 0 | 1 | Round 13 (vs. Chiefs) |
| (Australia) Folau Fainga'a | (Australia) Brumbies | 0 | 1 | Round 14 (vs. Blues) |
| (New Zealand) Tima Fainga'anuku | (New Zealand) Moana Pasifika | 0 | 1 | Round 12 (vs. Waratahs) |
| (Australia) Lalakai Foketi | (Australia) Waratahs | 0 | 1 | Round 9 (vs. Force) |
| (Australia) Feao Fotuaika | (Australia) Reds | 0 | 1 | Round 3 (vs. Force) |
| (New Zealand) Owen Franks | (New Zealand) Hurricanes | 0 | 1 | Quarter-final (vs. Brumbies) |
| (New Zealand) David Havili | (New Zealand) Crusaders | 0 | 1 | Round 5 (vs. Blues) |
| (New Zealand) Riley Higgins | (New Zealand) Hurricanes | 0 | 1 | Round 12 (vs. Drua) |
| (Australia) Harry Hoopert | (Australia) Reds | 0 | 1 | Round 4 (vs. Drua) |
| (New Zealand) Akira Ioane | (New Zealand) Blues | 0 | 1 | Round 15 (vs. Waratahs) |
| (New Zealand) Brayden Iose | (New Zealand) Hurricanes | 0 | 1 | Round 1 (vs. Crusaders) |
| (New Zealand) Luke Jacobson | (New Zealand) Chiefs | 0 | 1 | Round 13 (vs. Rebels) |
| (Ireland) Oli Jager | (New Zealand) Crusaders | 0 | 1 | Round 1 (vs. Hurricanes) |
| (New Zealand) Sefo Kautai | (Australia) Brumbies | 0 | 1 | Round 4 (vs. Rebels) |
| (Fiji) Jone Koroiduadua | (Fiji) Drua | 0 | 1 | Round 1 (vs. Waratahs) |
| (Australia) Kane Koteka | (Australia) Force | 0 | 1 | Round 8 (vs. Rebels) |
| (Australia) Christian Lealiifano | (New Zealand) Moana Pasifika | 0 | 1 | Round 5 (vs. Chiefs) |
| (Fiji) Frank Lomani | (Fiji) Drua | 0 | 1 | Round 7 (vs. Waratahs) |
| (Australia) Efi Ma'afu | (Australia) Rebels | 0 | 1 | Round 5 (vs. Waratahs) |
| (Australia) Tate McDermott | (Australia) Reds | 0 | 1 | Round 6 (vs. Waratahs) |
| (Australia) Connal McInerney | (Australia) Brumbies | 0 | 1 | Round 15 (vs. Moana Pasifika) |
| (Australia) Fraser McReight | (Australia) Reds | 0 | 1 | Round 14 (vs. Moana Pasifika) |
| (Argentina) Santiago Medrano | (Australia) Force | 0 | 1 | Round 11 (vs. Blues) |
| (New Zealand) Marino Mikaele-Tu'u | (New Zealand) Highlanders | 0 | 1 | Round 12 (vs. Reds) |
| (Samoa) Alamanda Motuga | (New Zealand) Moana Pasifika | 0 | 1 | Round 5 (vs. Highlanders) |
| (Australia) Josh Nasser | (Australia) Reds | 0 | 1 | Round 4 (vs. Drua) |
| (New Zealand) Sam Nock | (New Zealand) Blues | 0 | 1 | Round 8 (vs. Chiefs) |
| (Australia) Hunter Paisami | (Australia) Reds | 0 | 1 | Round 3 (vs. Force) |
| (Australia) Reesjan Pasitoa | (Australia) Force | 0 | 1 | Round 9 (vs. Waratahs) |
| (New Zealand) Veikoso Poloniati | (New Zealand) Moana Pasifika | 0 | 1 | Round 5 (vs. Highlanders) |
| (New Zealand) Pouri Rakete-Stones | (New Zealand) Hurricanes | 0 | 1 | Round 10 (vs. Reds) |
| (Fiji) Selestino Ravutaumada | (Fiji) Drua | 0 | 1 | Round 14 (vs. Crusaders) |
| (New Zealand) Marcel Renata | (New Zealand) Blues | 0 | 1 | Round 8 (vs. Chiefs) |
| (Wales) Jamie Roberts | (Australia) Waratahs | 0 | 1 | Round 10 (vs. Chiefs) |
| (Fiji) Ratu Leone Rotuisolia | (Fiji) Drua | 0 | 1 | Round 3 (vs. Rebels) |
| (Fiji) Tuidraki Samusamuvodre | (Fiji) Drua | 0 | 1 | Round 8 (vs. Brumbies) |
| (New Zealand) Justin Sangster | (New Zealand) Hurricanes | 0 | 1 | Round 11 (vs. Brumbies) |
| (Australia) James Slipper | (Australia) Brumbies | 0 | 1 | Round 4 (vs. Rebels) |
| (Samoa) Henry Stowers | (New Zealand) Moana Pasifika | 0 | 1 | Round 14 (vs. Reds) |
| (New Zealand) Bailyn Sullivan | (New Zealand) Hurricanes | 0 | 1 | Round 10 (vs. Reds) |
| (Australia) Tiaan Tauakipulu | (Australia) Waratahs | 0 | 1 | Round 1 (vs. Drua) |
| (Fiji) Samu Tawake | (Fiji) Drua | 0 | 1 | Round 1 (vs. Reds) |
| (New Zealand) Jeremy Thrush | (Australia) Force | 0 | 1 | Round 15 (vs. Hurricanes) |
| (Australia) Carlo Tizzano | (Australia) Waratahs | 0 | 1 | Round 4 (vs. Force) |
| (Australia) Matt To'omua | (Australia) Rebels | 0 | 1 | Round 8 (vs. Force) |
| (New Zealand) Karl Tu'inukuafe | (New Zealand) Blues | 0 | 1 | Round 10 (vs. Drua) |
| (Australia) Glen Vaihu | (Australia) Rebels | 0 | 1 | Round 4 (vs. Brumbies) |
| (Australia) Mahe Vailanu | (Australia) Waratahs | 0 | 1 | Round 9 (vs. Force) |
| (Australia) Rob Valetini | (Australia) Brumbies | 0 | 1 | Round 7 (vs. Reds) |
| (Australia) Connor Vest | (Australia) Reds | 0 | 1 | Round 10 (vs. Hurricanes) |
| (Australia) Rahboni Warren-Vosayaco | (Australia) Waratahs | 0 | 1 | Round 11 (vs. Crusaders) |
| (Australia) Nic White | (Australia) Brumbies | 0 | 1 | Round 4 (vs. Rebels) |
| (Australia) Harry Wilson | (Australia) Reds | 0 | 1 | Round 11 (vs. Chiefs) |

== Players ==
=== Squads ===
The following squads have been named. Players listed in italics denote non-original squad members:

Blues squad
| Forwards | Adrian Choat • Sam Darry • Kurt Eklund • Vaiolini Ekuasi • Josh Fusitua • Josh Goodhue • Alex Hodgman • Akira Ioane • Nepo Laulala • James Lay • Jordan Lay • Dalton Papalii • Taine Plumtree • Marcel Renata • Ricky Riccitelli • Tom Robinson • Luke Romano • Anton Segner • Hoskins Sotutu • Cameron Suafoa • James Tucker • Karl Tu'inukuafe • Ofa Tu'ungafasi • Soane Vikena |
| Backs | Nigel Ah Wong • Beauden Barrett • Finlay Christie • Caleb Clarke • Corey Evans • Taufa Funaki • Bryce Heem • Rieko Ioane • AJ Lam • Jock McKenzie • Lisati Milo-Harris • Sam Nock • Stephen Perofeta • Harry Plummer • Jacob Ratumaitavuki-Kneepkens • Zarn Sullivan • Mark Tele'a • Tanielu Teleʻa • Tamati Tua • Roger Tuivasa-Sheck |
| Coach | Leon MacDonald |

Brumbies squad
| Forwards | Allan Alaalatoa • Jahrome Brown • Folau Fainga'a • Nick Frost • Tom Hooper • Fred Kaihea • Sefo Kautai • Ed Kennedy • Lachlan Lonergan • Connal McInerney • Cadeyrn Neville • Billy Pollard • Luke Reimer • Tom Ross • Pete Samu • Rory Scott • Scott Sio • James Slipper • Darcy Swain • Rob Valetini |
| Backs | Lachie Albert • Tom Banks • Cam Clark • Hudson Creighton • Chris Feauai-Sautia • Len Ikitau • Rodney Iona • Noah Lolesio • Ryan Lonergan • Andy Muirhead • Jesse Mogg • Ollie Sapsford • Irae Simone • Nic White • Tom Wright |
| Coach | Dan McKellar |

Chiefs squad
| Forwards | Naitoa Ah Kuoi • Josh Bartlett • Kaylum Boshier • Mitchell Brown • Hamilton Burr • Sam Cane • George Dyer • Samipeni Finau • Tom Florence • Luke Jacobson • Mitch Jacobson • Josh Lord • Sione Mafileo • Laghlan McWhannell • Atu Moli • Ollie Norris • Reuben O'Neill • Simon Parker • Brodie Retallick • Aidan Ross • Bradley Slater • Pita Gus Sowakula • Angus Ta'avao • Samisoni Taukei'aho • Tyrone Thompson • Solomone Tukuafu • Tupou Vaa'i |
| Backs | Inga Finau • Bryn Gatland • Josh Ioane • Anton Lienert-Brown • Jonah Lowe • Etene Nanai-Seturo • Alex Nankivell • Emoni Narawa • Rameka Poihipi • Cortez Ratima • Rivez Reihana • Xavier Roe • Shaun Stevenson • Chase Tiatia • Kaleb Trask • Quinn Tupaea • Brad Weber • Gideon Wrampling |
| Coach | Clayton McMillan |

Crusaders squad
| Forwards | Scott Barrett • George Bell • Ethan Blackadder • George Bower • Finlay Brewis • Seb Calder • Tom Christie • Hamish Dalzell • Mitchell Dunshea • Zach Gallagher • Dominic Gardiner • Cullen Grace • Liam Hallam-Eames • Sione Havili Talitui • Ricky Jackson • Oli Jager • Corey Kellow • Shilo Klein • Pablo Matera • Brodie McAlister • Joe Moody • Fletcher Newell • Abraham Pole • Quinten Strange • Codie Taylor • Sam Whitelock • Tamaiti Williams |
| Backs | George Bridge • Fergus Burke • Mitchell Drummond • Braydon Ennor • Leicester Fainga'anuku • Chay Fihaki • Inga Finau • Jack Goodhue • Bryn Hall • David Havili • Simon Hickey • Will Jordan • Dallas McLeod • Richie Mo'unga • Kini Naholo • Isaiah Punivai • Sevu Reece • Te Toiroa Tahuriorangi |
| Coach | Scott Robertson |

Drua squad
| Forwards | Te Ahiwaru Cirikidaveta • Meli Derenalagi • Mesu Dolokoto • Haereiti Hetet • Tevita Ikanivere • Jone Koroiduadua • Chris Minimbi • Vilive Miramira • Raikabula Momoedonu • Nemani Nagusa • Isoa Nasilasila • Rusiate Nasove • Viliame Rarasea • Ratu Leone Rotuisolia • Kitione Salawa Jr. • Manasa Saulo • Timoci Sauvoli • Joseva Tamani • Samu Tawake • Jone Tiko • Zuriel Togiatama • Sorovakatini Tuifagalele • Meli Tuni • Kaliopasi Uluilakepa |
| Backs | Napolioni Bolaca • Ilaisa Droasese • Vinaya Habosi • Baden Kerr • Simione Kuruvoli • Frank Lomani • Jona Mataiciwa • Ratu Peni Matawalu • Caleb Muntz • Kalione Nasoko • Leone Nawai • Onisi Ratave • Kitione Ratu • Kalaveti Ravouvou • Selestino Ravutaumada • Tuidraki Samusamuvodre • Kitione Taliga • Teti Tela • Alivereti Veitokani • Apisalome Vota • Serupepeli Vularika • Josh Vuta |
| Coach | Mick Byrne |

Force squad
| Forwards | Bo Abra • Tim Anstee • Ollie Callan • Greg Holmes • Feleti Kaitu'u • Kane Koteka • Fergus Lee-Warner • Harry Lloyd • Alex Masibaka • Ryan McCauley • Santiago Medrano • Jackson Pugh • Andrew Ready • Tom Robertson • Izack Rodda • Will Sankey • Brynard Stander • Jeremy Thrush • Angus Wagner • Jack Winchester |
| Backs | Daniel Ala • Issak Fines-Leleiwasa • Kyle Godwin • Richard Kahui • Bayley Kuenzle • Brad Lacey • Grason Makara • Manasa Mataele • Michael McDonald • Jack McGregor • Jake McIntyre • Reesjan Pasitoa • Ian Prior • Toni Pulu • Byron Ralston • Jake Strachan • Reece Tapine |
| Coach | Tim Sampson |

Highlanders squad
| Forwards | Jermaine Ainsley • Leni Apisai • Sam Caird • Liam Coltman • Ethan de Groot • Josh Dickson • Bryn Evans • Gareth Evans • Sam Fischli • Shannon Frizell • Billy Harmon • Max Hicks • Josh Hohneck • Fabian Holland • Luca Inch • Ayden Johnstone • James Lentjes • Daniel Lienert-Brown • Christian Lio-Willie • Andrew Makalio • Rhys Marshall • Saula Ma'u • Marino Mikaele-Tu'u • Pari Pari Parkinson • Hugh Renton • Manaaki Selby-Rickit • Jeff Thwaites • Sean Withy |
| Backs | Solomon Alaimalo • James Arscott • Marty Banks • Liam Coombes-Fabling • Mosese Dawai • Folau Fakatava • Connor Garden-Bachop • Sam Gilbert • Scott Gregory • Kayne Hammington • Nathan Hastie • Mitch Hunt • Vilimoni Koroi • Jona Nareki • Fetuli Paea • Ngane Punivai • Aaron Smith • Denny Solomona • Vereniki Tikoisolomone • Josh Timu • Sio Tomkinson • Thomas Umaga-Jensen • Freedom Vahaakolo • Rory van Vugt |
| Coach | Tony Brown |

Hurricanes squad
| Forwards | Leni Apisai • Asafo Aumua • Dominic Bird • James Blackwell • Dane Coles • Caleb Delany • Jacob Devery • Alex Fidow • Devan Flanders • Owen Franks • Blake Gibson • TK Howden • Brayden Iose • Bruce Kauika-Petersen • Kianu Kereru-Symes • Du'Plessis Kirifi • Tyler Laubscher • Tyrel Lomax • Tevita Mafileo • Siua Maile • Ben May • Xavier Numia • James O'Reilly • Tom Parsons • Reed Prinsep • Jared Proffit • Pouri Rakete-Stones • Justin Sangster • Ardie Savea • Scott Scrafton • Pasilio Tosi • Raymond Tuputupu • Isaia Walker-Leawere |
| Backs | Jordie Barrett • Jamie Booth • Jackson Garden-Bachop • Wes Goosen • Logan Henry • Riley Higgins • Richard Judd • Ruben Love • Josh Moorby • Aidan Morgan • Pepesana Patafilo • TJ Perenara • Billy Proctor • Salesi Rayasi • Cam Roigard • Julian Savea • Bailyn Sullivan • Peter Umaga-Jensen • Teihorangi Walden |
| Coach | Jason Holland |

Moana Pasifika squad
| Forwards | Joe Apikotoa • Chris Apoua • Suetena Asomua • Xavier Cowley-Tuioti • Michael Curry • Penitoa Finau • Solomone Funaki • Lotu Inisi • Niko Jones • Josh Kaifa • Sekope Kepu • Tau Koloamatangi • Jack Lam • Ezekiel Lindenmuth • Don Lolo • Mike McKee • Alex McRobbie • Sam Moli • Alamanda Motuga • Mahonri Ngakuru • Ray Niuia • Abraham Pole • Veikoso Poloniati • Joe Royal • Sam Slade • Henry Stowers • Luteru Tolai • Sione Tuipulotu • Isi Tu'ungafasi |
| Backs | Nigel Ah Wong • Tomasi Alosio • Levi Aumua • Ere Enari • Tima Fainga'anuku • Neria Fomai • William Havili • Fine Inisi • Solomone Kata • Christian Lealiifano • D'Angelo Leuila • Lincoln McClutchie • Manu Paea • Dwayne Polataivao • Henry Taefu • Jonathan Taumateine • Timoci Tavatavanawai • Danny Toala • Anzelo Tuitavuki • Lolagi Visinia |
| Coach | Aaron Mauger |

Rebels squad
| Forwards | Isaac Aedo Kailea • Josh Canham • Cabous Eloff • Sef Fa'agase • Pone Fa'amausili • Matt Gibbon • James Hanson • Richard Hardwick • Ross Haylett-Petty • Josh Hill • Trevor Hosea • Michael Icely • Tamati Ioane • Josh Kemeny • Rob Leota • Sione Lolesio • Efi Ma'afu • Daniel Maiava • Tom Nowlan • Cameron Orr • Matt Philip • Emosi Tuqiri • Jordan Uelese • Rhys van Nek • Sam Wallis • Michael Wells • Brad Wilkin |
| Backs | Lachie Anderson • Carter Gordon • Mason Gordon • Reece Hodge • Stacey Ili • Nick Jooste • Andrew Kellaway • Lebron Naea • Ray Nu'u • Joe Pincus • Joe Powell • Lukas Ripley • Jeral Skelton • Moses Sorovi • Young Tonumaipea • Matt To'omua • James Tuttle • Glen Vaihu • Ilikena Vudogo • George Worth |
| Coach | Kevin Foote |

Reds squad
| Forwards | Albert Anae • Richie Asiata • George Blake • Angus Blyth • Sef Fa'agase • Matt Faessler • Lopeti Faifua • Feao Fotuaika • Harry Hoopert • Alex Mafi • Fraser McReight • Josh Nasser • Zane Nonggorr • Lukhan Salakaia-Loto • Angus Scott-Young • Ryan Smith • Tuaina Taii Tualima • Taniela Tupou • Seru Uru • Connor Vest • Harry Wilson • Liam Wright • Dane Zander |
| Backs | Floyd Aubrey • Jock Campbell • Lawson Creighton • Filipo Daugunu • Ilaisa Droasese • Josh Flook • Mac Grealy • Isaac Henry • Spencer Jeans • Tom Lynagh • Tate McDermott • James O'Connor • Hunter Paisami • Jordan Petaia • Hamish Stewart • Kalani Thomas • Suliasi Vunivalu |
| Coach | Brad Thorn |

Waratahs squad
| Forwards | Angus Bell • Hugh Bokenham • Adrian Brown • Ed Craig • Geoff Cridge • Max Douglas • Tetera Faulkner • Charlie Gamble • Langi Gleeson • Ned Hanigan • Will Harris • Jed Holloway • Archer Holz • Michael Hooper • Tom Horton • Harry Johnson-Holmes • Dave Porecki • Paddy Ryan • Hugh Sinclair • Ruan Smith • Lachlan Swinton • Tiaan Tauakipulu • Carlo Tizzano • Hamdahn Tuipulotu • Mahe Vailanu • Rahboni Warren-Vosayaco • Jeremy Williams |
| Backs | Kurtley Beale • Ben Donaldson • Tane Edmed • Lalakai Foketi • Tevita Funa • Jake Gordon • Jack Grant • Will Harrison • Mark Nawaqanitawase • Alex Newsome • Izaia Perese • Dylan Pietsch • James Ramm • Triston Reilly • Jamie Roberts • Henry Robertson • Mosese Tuipulotu • James Turner • Joey Walton • Teddy Wilson |
| Coach | Darren Coleman |

== Referees ==
The following referees were selected to officiate the 2022 Super Rugby Pacific season:

2022 Super Rugby referees
| Australia | Nic Berry • Graham Cooper • Angus Gardner • Reuben Keane • Damon Murphy • Jordan Way |
| New Zealand | James Doleman • Mike Fraser • Angus Mabey • Ben O'Keeffe • Brendon Pickerill • Dan Waenga • Paul Williams |
