= Billy Pollard =

Australian rugby union player

- Born: 9 December 2001 (age 24) Sydney, New South Wales, Australia
- Height: 186 cm (6 ft 1 in)
- Weight: 110 kg (240 lb; 17 st 5 lb)
- School: Barker College

Rugby union career
- Position: Hooker
- Current team: ACT Brumbies
Youth career
- –2018: Hornsby Lions
- 2016–2019: Barker College
Senior career
Years	Team	Apps	(Points)
2020–	Brumbies	56	(100)
2023	→ La Rochelle (loan)	2	(5)
- Correct as of 7 November 2026
International career
Years	Team	Apps	(Points)
2018–2019	Australian Schoolboys	6	(0)
2022	Australia A	2	(0)
2022–	Australia	26	(15)
- Correct as of 17 October 2026

Billy Pollard (born 9 December 2001) is an Australian rugby union player who plays as a hooker for the ACT Brumbies and the Australia national team.

== Youth career ==
Pollard was born in the New South Wales state capital of Sydney, Australia in 2001. He grew up in a "staunch" rugby league-supporting family in north-western Sydney. Billy's father (John) and grandfather (Paul) both played rugby league for the North Sydney Bears. Pollard began playing junior rugby league at six-years-old with the Asquith Magpies. Five years later, Pollard is reported to have first taken up rugby union as a junior with the Hornsby Lions. Pollard was educated at Barker College, a private Anglican school located in Northern Sydney. While at Barker Pollard played rugby for the school's 1st XV alongside future Brumbies teammate Luke Reimer. In 2017, while playing for Barker in year 10, Australian sports website Green and Gold Rugby (G&GR) highlighted his improved game throughout the year and awarded him the "Rising Star" for players within the Combined Associated Schools (CAS). The following year (2018), Pollard was moved from his usual position within the back row to hooker for the first time in his career. Pollard, talking to The Sydney Morning Herald, stated: "They told me if I wanted to pursue union professionally, that would be the position for me. And thanks God I listened to my coaches. That's when I really started to enjoy and focus on union." His move was a successful one, as Barker won the Henry Plume Cup with Pollard at hooker, and being selected in the Combined Associated Schools (CAS) 1st XV for the year of 2018.

In Pollard's final year of school at Barker College he was selected in the Australian Schoolboys team on their tour of Great Britain and Ireland. He made a total of six appearances across 2018 and 2019, including an 18–14 win over New Zealand Schoolboys in Hamilton; their first win against New Zealand in seven years. While in his final year Pollard was pursued by seven rugby league clubs in the National Rugby League (NRL), most seriously by the South Sydney Rabbitohs, having a meeting with club coach Wayne Bennett. Pollard, however, turned down rugby league for the Brumbies in the Super Rugby.

== Career ==
=== Early domestic career ===
In late 2019 Pollard signed a four-year deal with Australian Super Rugby team the Brumbies that began in 2020. Coach Dan McKellar praised Pollard's ability, stating: "Defensively he is abrasive and aggressive, loves to compete and enjoys the physical side of the game. These are great natural traits that Billy has." Pollard spoke highly of the Brumbies upon his signing, praising the teams forward pack prowess: "I am looking forward to working with Dan [McKellar] and Laurie (Fisher) and learning off some of the best front-row forwards in the country... The Brumbies set-piece is one of the best around and I can't wait to get started." Pollard spent 2020, which was heavily disrupted by the impacts of the COVID-19 pandemic, with the Brumbies Academy Development program.

In November 2020, Pollard, among many other youth players were promoted to the senior squad ahead of the 2021 season. Pollard made his debut in the final round of the Super Rugby Trans-Tasman against the Highlanders. Pollard was a 58th minute substitute for Lachlan Lonergan. The Brumbies lost 12–33.

In the inaugural Super Rugby Pacific, Pollard made seven appearances for the ACT Brumbies in a dominant season for the team, scoring three tries in an impressive rookie season. He started at hooker (No. 2) for the Brumbies in round eight against the Fijian Drua, and made his international debut for both the Australia A team and the Wallabies.

=== La Rochelle ===
Pollard played just six games for the ACT Brumbies in 2023, missing the start of the season due to a hand injury. He re-signed with the team in April until 2025. In July 2023 French club La Rochelle of the Top 14 announced the acquisition of Pollard on a short-term deal during the 2023 Rugby World Cup. Pollard played two matches for the club and scored a try on his debut against Lyon. Pollard recounted his experience in France positively, telling Rugby.com.au: "The whole time I was there was really surreal just seeing what it's like over there and the crowds and atmosphere. Everything's fairly different to what you get at Super [Rugby] level so I got a good test of it and I loved it."

=== Brumbies return ===
Pollard had his most consistent season to date with the ACT Brumbies in 2024. He played thirteen games overall, scored four tries, and secured the starting hooker position early on in the campaign, replacing Lachlan Lonergan who was injured with a fractured and dislocated ankle in round six. The ACT Brumbies lost 20–34 to the Blues in the Semi-finals.

Pollard had a standout 2025 season for the ACT Brumbies. He played in fifteen of their sixteen Super Rugby games, scoring eleven tries (alongside teammate Corey Toole), the second-most tries in the Super Rugby for the season. By round thirteen the ACT Brumbies had scored 54 tries from 116 entries into the oppositions 22 metre area, or 46% conversion rate; putting them tied in first place with the Crusaders and Moana Pasifika. Pollard, along with prop forward teammate Allan Alaalatoa, were the main beneficiaries of this improved attacking strategy, scoring nineteen tries between them. The ACT Brumbies' set-piece was also amongst the best performing in the world, with the team holding a 97% success at the scrum, 91.9% scrum completion, 93.4% maul win percentage, an average of 0.56 tries per game via the maul, and the 76.9% ratio of tries originating from the set piece.

In June 2025 Pollard resigned with the ACT Brumbies until 2027 and declared: "There's nowhere else I would rather be at this stage of my career. I feel I've got a lot of growth in me as a player, and a person, that can be achieved here in Canberra." A month earlier, in May 2025, The Sydney Morning Herald reported that Pollard was rumoured to move to the National Rugby League's (NRL) new expansion team, the Perth Bears, for their inaugural season in 2027.

== International career ==
Pollard made his international debut for Australia's second national rugby team, Australia A, in the first round of the 2022 Pacific Nations Cup (PNC) against Samoa. Pollard started at hooker, and played 52 minutes before being replaced by Feleti Kaitu'u. Pollard made another appearance for Australia A in the third round against Tonga. Australia A finished second overall in the tournament. Weeks later Pollard was called-up to the Wallabies squad as an injury replacement following a concussion to Dave Porecki. He made his senior international debut on 13 August 2022 against Argentina in round two of the 2022 Rugby Championship. Pollard started on the bench and replaced Lachlan Lonergan in the 64th minute. Australia lost 48–17 in San Juan.

Pollard returned to the Australia squad in June 2024 ahead of their two-Test series against Wales on their 2024 tour of Australia. Pollard played in the first Test as a substitute, and played in Australia's test against Georgia at the Sydney Football Stadium following the test-series against Wales. Pollard was also named in Australia's squad for the 2024 Rugby Championship. Pollard played in their second round home defeat to South Africa, however played no further part in the tournament. Pollard later joined the Australia squad on their Grand Slam tour, playing in the last two games against Scotland and Ireland, respectively.

Since the 2025 international season began, Pollard has been a mainstay at hooker for the Wallabies. Starting on the bench in Australia's first three matches, Pollard was moved to starting hooker in their final test against the British & Irish Lions. Pollard has started in every Australia match of the 2025 Rugby Championship.

== Career statistics ==
=== Club ===
As of 7 November 2026.

Statistics by club, season and competition
Club	Season	League			
Club	Season	Division	Apps	Tries	Points
Brumbies	2021	Super Rugby AU	—		
Brumbies	2021	Super Rugby Trans-Tasman	1	0	0
Brumbies	2022	Super Rugby Pacific	7	3	15
Brumbies	2023	Super Rugby Pacific	6	0	0
Brumbies	Total		14	3	15
La Rochelle (loan)	2023–24	Top 14	2	1	5
Brumbies	2024	Super Rugby Pacific	13	4	20
Brumbies	2025	Super Rugby Pacific	15	11	55
Brumbies	2026	Super Rugby Pacific	14	2	10
Brumbies	Total		42	17	85
Career total			58	21	105

=== International ===
As of 7 November 2026.

Statistics by team and year
Team	Year	Statistic		
Team	Year	Apps	Tries	Points
Australia A	2022	2	0	0
Australia	2022	1	0	0
Australia	2024	5	0	0
Australia	2025	14	2	10
Australia	2026	7	1	5
Total		27	3	15

=== International tries ===
List of international tries scored by Billy Pollard
No.	Opponent	Location	Competition	Date	Result	Ref.
1	New Zealand	Eden Park, Auckland	2025 Rugby Championship	27 September 2025	24–33	
2	Ireland	Aviva Stadium, Dublin	2025 Autumn International	15 November 2025	19–46	
3	Italy	Perth Rectangular Stadium, Perth	2026 Nations Championship	18 July 2026	57–10	
