= Connor Vest =

Australian rugby union player

- Born: 26 April 1994 (age 32) Queanbeyan, New South Wales, Australia
- Height: 195 cm (6 ft 5 in)
- Weight: 115 kg (254 lb; 18 st 2 lb)
- School: Grafton High School

Rugby union career
- Position(s): Lock, Flanker
- Current team: Reds
Youth career
- Grafton Rugby Club
Amateur team(s)
| Years | Team | Apps | (Points) |
| 2014–2019 | Northern Suburbs | 64 | (75) |
| 2019– | University of Queensland | | |
Senior career
| Years | Team | Apps | (Points) |
| 2016–2018 | Sydney Rays | 21 | (17) |
| 2019 | NSW Country Eagles | 4 | (5) |
| 2022 | Auckland | 8 | (8) |
- Correct as of 1 October 2022
Super Rugby
| Years | Team | Apps | (Points) |
| 2022–2025 | Reds | 26 | (5) |
- Correct as of 17 May 2025

Connor Vest (born 26 April 1994) is a retired Australian rugby union player. Vest most recently played for the Queensland Reds in the Super Rugby primarily as a lock, and secondarily as across the back row.

== Career ==
Vest was born in Queanbeyan, New South Wales on the outskirts of the Australian Capital Territory (ACT). He was educated at Grafton High School in Northern New South Wales where he played junior rugby for the Grafton Rugby Club. In 2014 Vest was selected in the Waratahs under-20s team.

After playing club rugby in Sydney's Shute Shield, Vest joined the North Harbour Rays (later known as Sydney Rays) in the National Rugby Championship (NRC), being announced in their 32-player squad for 2017. Vest had trained with the squad ahead of the 2016 season but was not selected. Vest played three seasons with the Rays alongside club rugby in the Shute Shield before disruptions stemming from the COVID-19 pandemic ended the NRC.

=== Reds ===
Vest was named in the Queensland Reds' 23-man team sheet in March 2022 ahead of their fourth round fixture against the Fijian Drua in the inaugural Super Rugby Pacific season. Vest played in ten matches throughout his debut season, scoring one try in the process. Following his first season with the Reds, Vest signed with Auckland in New Zealand's National Provincial Championship (NPC). He played in eight games, starting in four of them, all in the lock position.

=== Neck injury ===
In Round 14 of the 2023 Super Rugby season, Vest suffered a severe neck injury while playing against the Highlanders at Forsyth Barr Stadium in Dunedin. Vest, whom had the ball, ran head-first into opposing player Shannon Frizell, whom was trying to tackle. He received a protocol head-injury assessment (HIA) by his teams medics during a pause of play. Vest failed to pass the HIA, and less than two hours later was in hospital where it was revealed he had suffered a cervical fracture of the C7 vertebrae; also known as a broken neck. Vest's teammate Harry Wilson was critical of referee Brendon Pickerill's actions during the incident, and stated post-match: "...as a playing group we were very frustrated with the referee trying to rush him off the field. We thought that was pretty disrespectful for a player who has just broken his neck, trying to rush him off the field as if he's wasting time." The Super Rugby replied in a statement: "The comments attributed to Harry Wilson of the Reds in the media are factually incorrect and whilst they may have been well intending in support of a teammate, he has been issued with a reminder that care must be taken with public comments not to impair the public confidence in the integrity of match officials."

=== Return from injury ===
Vest made his return to the squad by Round 10 of the following season (2024). He made most of his impact from the bench, and played six matches for the Reds overall.
