= Sam Gilbert (rugby union) =

New Zealand rugby union player

- Born: 21 January 1999 (age 27) Whangārei, Northland, New Zealand
- Height: 189 cm (6 ft 2 in)
- Weight: 98 kg (216 lb; 15 st 6 lb)
- School: St. Andrew's College

Rugby union career
- Position(s): First five-eighth, Wing, Fullback
- Current team: Connacht
Senior career
Years	Team	Apps	(Points)
2019	Canterbury	6	(25)
2020–2025	Highlanders	57	(329)
2021–2025	Otago	30	(83)
2025–	Connacht	12	(105)
- Correct as of 24 March 2026
International career
Years	Team	Apps	(Points)
2019	New Zealand U20	1	(5)
2023	All Blacks XV	2	(0)
- Correct as of 15 July 2023

Sam Gilbert (born 21 January 1999) is a New Zealand rugby union player who plays primarily as a fullback and centre. Since 2025, Gilbert has played for Irish club Connacht in the United Rugby Championship (URC).

== Career ==
=== Highlanders ===
In 2020 Gilbert made his Super Rugby debut for the Highlanders in the first round of the inaugural season of Super Rugby Aotearoa against the Chiefs. Gilbert started on the right-wing. The Highlanders won 28–27.

In 2021, Gilbert earned more match-time with the Highlanders and became a mainstay for Otago during their 2021 campaign, which saw them reach the NPC Championship Grand Final. In 2022 Gilbert became a first-team outside back for the Highlanders, playing twelve of their fifteen-season games. In Round 14 of the season, Gilbert, playing at first five-eighth for the Highlanders against the Waratahs, performed a "tip tackle" on opposing player Michael Hooper, who subsequently landed on his neck. Gilbert was given a red card and later received a five-game suspension. The Highlanders went on to play another two matches in the season without Gilbert (Round 15, Quarter-finals).

In 2023, similar to 2022, Gibert was deployed across multiple positions in the backline. Having already played on the wings, at fullback, and as first five-eighth, Gilbert was moved to inside centre (initially in pre-season) beginning in Round 10 of the season. It was the 2023 season that Gilbert became the team's primary goal-kicker. Gilbert, overall, kicked 33 conversions and 12 penalty goals for the Highlanders.

2024 saw Gilbert's scoreboard presence heavily reduced from inside centre, with the introduction of Cam Millar at first five-eighth taking over goal-kicking duties toward the latter-half of the 2024 Super Rugby Pacific season. 2024 was Gilbert's most consistent season at the Highlanders since debuting in 2020. Being promoted to vice-captain ahead of the season, he started in 11 of their 15 fixtures, and played in 14 overall.

Gilbert was returned as the primary goal-kicker for the Highlanders in 2025, as well as the fullback and wing positions. In a poor season for the team, Gilbert scored 5 tries, 14 conversions and 12 penalty goals, and overall finished with 89 points, or fifth on the seasonal stats sheet.

=== Connacht ===
In May 2025, it was announced that Gilbert had signed for Irish club Connacht in the United Rugby Championship (URC). His term with the team began in the 2025–26 season following Gilbert's obligations with Otago.

== International career ==
Gilbert was selected in a New Zealand U20s development camp held in Palmerston North alongside 49 players in preparation for their 2019 World Rugby Under 20 Championship campaign. Gilbert was selected in New Zealand U20s squad for their match against Fiji U20 in the 2019 Oceania Rugby Under 20 Championship. Gilbert, starting on the left-wing, scored one try in a 53–7 victory.

Gilbert was called up to the All Blacks XV for their tour of Japan as part of 2023 Rugby World Cup warm-up matches. In the teams first of two fixtures, Gilbert came off the bench against a Japan XV team, replacing Jack Goodhue in the 67th minute. The All Blacks XV won 6–38. In the second fixture in Japan, Gilbert replaced fullback Ruben Love in the 59th minute. The All Blacks XV won against Japan 27–41.

== Player profile ==
Gilbert is credited with his versatility skills and rugby intelligence, making him a valuable asset on the field. Known primarily for his role as a fullback with kicking duties, Gilbert has also demonstrated strong capability at inside centre, wing, and increasingly, at "out-half". His rugby journey began with Canterbury, where he was primarily deployed as a first-five eighth, giving him a foundational understanding of game management and tactical kicking. Over the past two seasons (2024, 2025) with the Highlanders, Gilbert cemented his reputation as a dependable "everyman" across the backline, seamlessly filling in at various positions when needed.
