= Abraham Pole =

New Zealand rugby union player

- Born: Abraham Pole; 28 June 1998 (age 28) New Zealand
- Height: 186 cm (6 ft 1 in)
- Weight: 119 kg (262 lb; 18 st 10 lb)
- School: Otago Boys' High School

Rugby union career
- Position: Prop
- Current team: Narbonne
Senior career
Years	Team	Apps	(Points)
2021–2025	Otago	47	(10)
2022	Crusaders	2	(5)
2022–2026	Moana Pasifika	59	(65)
2026–	Narbonne	0	(0)
- Correct as of 16 July 2026

Abraham Pole (born 28 June 1998) is a New Zealand rugby union player who plays as a prop for French club Narbonne.

He previously played for Otago in New Zealand's National Provincial Championship and Moana Pasifika in Super Rugby Pacific.

== Early life ==
Pole attended Otago Boys' High School, where he played for the school's First XV.

In 2017, he played for the New Zealand Schools team. He has also played club rugby for Harbour RFC in Dunedin.

== Rugby career ==
Pole signed with Otago for the 2021 Bunnings NPC. He made his debut on 7 August in a 26–19 home win against Southland.

In 2022, Pole signed for the Crusaders where he made 2 appearances and scored one try. That same year he transferred to Moana Pasifika for whom he has played since.
