= Justin Sangster =

New Zealand rugby union player

- Born: 30 November 1996 (age 29) New Zealand
- Height: 198 cm (6 ft 6 in)
- Weight: 115 kg (254 lb; 18 st 2 lb)
- School: Aquinas College

Rugby union career
- Position(s): Lock, Flanker
- Current team: Shizuoka Blue Revs
Senior career
Years	Team	Apps	(Points)
2021–2024	Bay of Plenty	8	(5)
2022–2024	Hurricanes	9	(5)
2024–	Shizuoka Blue Revs	21	(25)
- Correct as of 5 June 2022

Justin Sangster (born 30 November 1996) is a New Zealand rugby union player who plays for the Hurricanes in Super Rugby. His playing position is lock. He was named in the Hurricanes squad for the 2022 Super Rugby Pacific season. He was also a member of the Bay of Plenty 2021 Bunnings NPC squad.
