= Wakatipu Rugby Club =

- Interactive map of Wakatipu Rugby Club
- Location: Queenstown, New Zealand
- Coordinates: 45°01′45.87″S 168°39′31.73″E

Construction
- Groundbreaking: 1953
- Built: 1953
- Opened: 1953

Tenant
- Wakatipu Rugby Club

Wakatipu Rugby Club is a rugby union club in Queenstown, New Zealand. The club was established in 1953 and is a member of the Otago Rugby Football Union

In 2022, due to the COVID-19 pandemic, New Zealand teams during the 2022 Super Rugby Pacific season went into bio-bubbles in Queenstown, New Zealand for the opening three rounds of the season. This meant eight matches were relocated to the Otago and Southland area, originally to Rugby Park in Invercargill and Queenstown, before night matches were confirmed for Forsyth Barr Stadium, Dunedin instead. As the only rugby union stadium in Queenstown, Wakatipu Rugby Club was scheduled to host three matches over the opening three rounds, making the 2022 season the first time that Queenstown hosted an official Super Rugby match.
