= Pone Fa'amausili =

Australian rugby union player

- Born: 26 February 1997 (age 29) Melbourne, Australia
- Height: 196 cm (6 ft 5 in)
- Weight: 130 kg (20 st 7 lb; 290 lb)
- School: Dandenong High School

Rugby union career
- Position: Prop
- Current team: Moana Pasifika
Senior career
Years	Team	Apps	(Points)
2017–2019	Melbourne Rising	11	(5)
Super Rugby
Years	Team	Apps	(Points)
2018–2024	Rebels	39	(10)
2024	→ Waratahs	1	(0)
2025–	Moana Pasifika	0	(0)
International career
Years	Team	Apps	(Points)
2022–	Australia	6	(0)

Pone Fa'amausili (born 26 February 1997) is an Australian rugby union footballer who plays for Moana Pasifika in Super Rugby, having previously played for Melbourne Rebels. His position of choice is prop.

== Early life and grassroots rugby ==
Fa'amausili was born and raised in Melbourne, Victoria, and is of Samoan descent, tracing his lineage to the villages of Malie and Vailoa Palauli. He played his junior grassroots rugby for the Moorabbin Rugby Club (Moorabbin Rams), developing through the Victorian rugby system. Despite moving into the professional ranks, Fa'amausili has maintained a strong connection to his junior club, occasionally returning to assist with junior clinics and running out for a match with the Moorabbin Rams first-grade side during the 2023 season.

== Professional career ==
=== Super Rugby ===
Following a stint with the Melbourne Rising in the National Rugby Championship, Fa'amausili made his Super Rugby debut for the Melbourne Rebels in 2018. Noted for his physical and hard-hitting playing style, he became a regular fixture in the Rebels' front row. Following the closure of the Melbourne Rebels franchise, Fa'amausili signed a one-year contract with Moana Pasifika for the 2025 Super Rugby Pacific season under head coach Tana Umaga. Due to early-season injuries, his debut for the club was delayed until May 2025.

=== Europe ===
In September 2025, Fa'amausili moved to French rugby, signing with Pro D2 club Soyaux Angoulême XV Charente as a medical joker following an injury to tighthead prop Yassin Boutemmani.

=== International career ===
Fa'amausili was first called up to the Australian national team squad during the 2020 international season. He made his official Test debut for the Wallabies off the bench against Argentina in August 2022. In 2023, he made his first international Test start against New Zealand at the Melbourne Cricket Ground and was subsequently selected by head coach Eddie Jones for Australia's 2023 Rugby World Cup squad in France.

== Super Rugby statistics ==
As of 3 June 2023

Season	Team	Games	Starts	Sub	Mins	Tries	Cons	Pens	Drops	Points	Yel	Red
2018	Rebels	1	0	1	11	0	0	0	0	0	0	0
2019	Rebels	4	0	4	89	0	0	0	0	0	0	0
2020	Rebels	0	0	0	0	0	0	0	0	0	0	0
2020 AU	Rebels	7	4	3	254	0	0	0	0	0	0	0
2021 AU	Rebels	8	7	1	407	0	0	0	0	0	0	1
2021 TT	Rebels	0	0	0	0	0	0	0	0	0	0	0
2022	Rebels	5	4	1	256	1	0	0	0	5	0	0
2023	Rebels	13	1	12	354	1	0	0	0	5	0	0
Total		38	16	22	1,374	2	0	0	0	10	0	1
