= Reuben Keane =

Australian rugby union referee

- Born: Reuben Keane Canberra, Australia

Rugby union career
Refereeing career
| Years | Competition | Apps |
| 2018–pres. | World Rugby Sevens Series | |
| 2022–pres. | Super Rugby | |
- Correct as of 16 February 2022

Reuben Keane is an Australian professional rugby union referee.

== Refereeing career ==
Keane has been refereeing since his early teens, and refereed at the 2018 Commonwealth Games as a 19-year old. In October 2021, he was an assistant referee during the 2021 Rugby Championship. On 16 February 2022, he was announced as a referee for the 2022 Super Rugby Pacific season.

Keane most recently served as a referee in the 2024 Paris Olympics, reaching the semi final stage.

International test match debut November 2024, Hong Kong China vs Brazil in Hong Kong.
