= Jake Strachan =

Australian rugby union player

- Born: Jake Strachan; 25 December 1996 (age 29) Brisbane, Australia
- Height: 182 cm (6 ft 0 in)
- Weight: 86 kg (190 lb; 13 st 8 lb)
- School: Brisbane State High School

Rugby union career
- Position: Fly-half / Fullback
Senior career
Years	Team	Apps	(Points)
2016–2017	Brisbane City	3	(14)
2019	Force	8	(7)
2024-	Southland	9	(18)
- Correct as of 5 October 2024
Super Rugby
Years	Team	Apps	(Points)
2020–2023	Force	27	(50)
2024	Rebels	9	(13)
- Correct as of 8 June 2024

Jake Strachan (born 25 December 1996 in Australia) is an Australian rugby union player who plays for Southland in the National Provincial Championship.

His original playing position is fly-half or fullback.

He previously played for Force in Global Rapid Rugby and the Super Rugby AU competition, and for the Rebels in Super Rugby Pacific in 2024.

He was named in the Force squad for the Global Rapid Rugby competition in 2020.

After the 2024 Super Rugby season, he joined Southland for the NPC 2024 season.

== Super Rugby statistics ==
As of 30 August 2023

Season	Team	Games	Starts	Sub	Mins	Tries	Cons	Pens	Drops	Points	Yel	Red
2020 AU	Force	3	2	1	172	0	0	0	0	0	0	0
2021 AU	Force	3	1	2	105	0	0	0	0	0	0	0
2021 TT	Force	4	2	2	107	0	0	0	0	0	0	0
2022	Force	13	13	0	957	2	4	5	0	33	0	0
2023	Force	4	1	3	145	1	3	2	0	17	0	0
Total		27	19	8	1,486	3	7	7	0	50	0	0
