= Will Harris (rugby union) =

Australian rugby union player (born 2000)

- Born: 8 June 2000 (age 26) Australia
- Height: 195 cm (6 ft 5 in)
- Weight: 116 kg (256 lb; 18 st 4 lb)
- School: The Scots College

Rugby union career
- Position: Number 8
Senior career
Years	Team	Apps	(Points)
2019–	NSW Country Eagles	7	(0)
- Correct as of 6 January 2020
Super Rugby
Years	Team	Apps	(Points)
2019–2023	Waratahs	41	(40)
2024–	Force	40	(10)
- Correct as of 30 May 2026
Medal record
Men's rugby union
Representing Australia
Oceania U20 Championship
Winner	2019 Gold Coast
Junior World Cup
Runner-up	2019 Argentina

Will Harris (born 8 June 2000, in Australia) is an Australian rugby union player who currently plays for the WA Force Super Rugby Team. Prior to joining the Force in 2024, Harris played for the NSW Waratahs. His playing position is number 6 and 8. He first signed to the Waratahs squad for the 2020 season.

Harris has over 50 Super Rugby caps, and also played for the Junior Wallabies.
