= Hunter Paisami =

Samoa-born Australian rugby union player

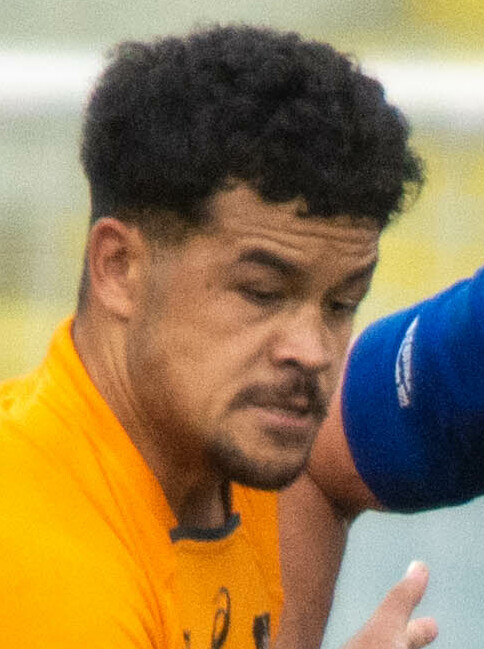
- Born: Hunter Oikoumeme Paisami; 10 April 1998 (age 28) Savai'i, Samoa
- Height: 177 cm (5 ft 10 in)
- Weight: 100 kg (15 st 10 lb; 220 lb)
- School: Mangere College and Pakenham Secondary College

Rugby union career
- Position: Centre
- Current team: Yamaha Blue Revs
Senior career
Years	Team	Apps	(Points)
2017	Melbourne Rising	7	(0)
2019	Brisbane City	8	(5)
2020–2026	Reds	77	(50)
2026–	Yamaha Blue Revs		
- Correct as of 6 June 2026
International career
Years	Team	Apps	(Points)
2017	Samoa U20	4	(27)
2020–	Australia	39	(15)
- Correct as of 27 September 2026

Hunter Paisami (born 10 April 1998) is a Samoa-born Australian rugby union player who plays for the Reds in the Super Rugby competition. His position of choice is centre.

Paisami joined the Reds ahead of the 2020 Super Rugby season, and made his debut for Australia at the end of the 2020 season.
