= Jahrome Brown =

New Zealand rugby union player

- Born: 29 September 1996 (age 30) New Zealand
- Height: 189 cm (6 ft 2 in)
- Weight: 105 kg (231 lb; 16 st 7 lb)

Rugby union career
Senior career
Years	Team	Apps	(Points)
2025	Putaruru RFC	1	
- Correct as of 22 March 2019
Provincial / State sides
Years	Team	Apps	(Points)
2017-	Waikato	2	(0)
Super Rugby
Years	Team	Apps	(Points)
2019–2024	Brumbies	50	(20)
- Correct as of 12 May 2022

Jahrome Brown (born 29 September 1996) is a New Zealand rugby union player who plays for the Brumbies in Super Rugby. His playing position is flanker. He was named in the side to play the Reds in week 6.
