= Rahboni Warren-Vosayaco =

Australian rugby union player

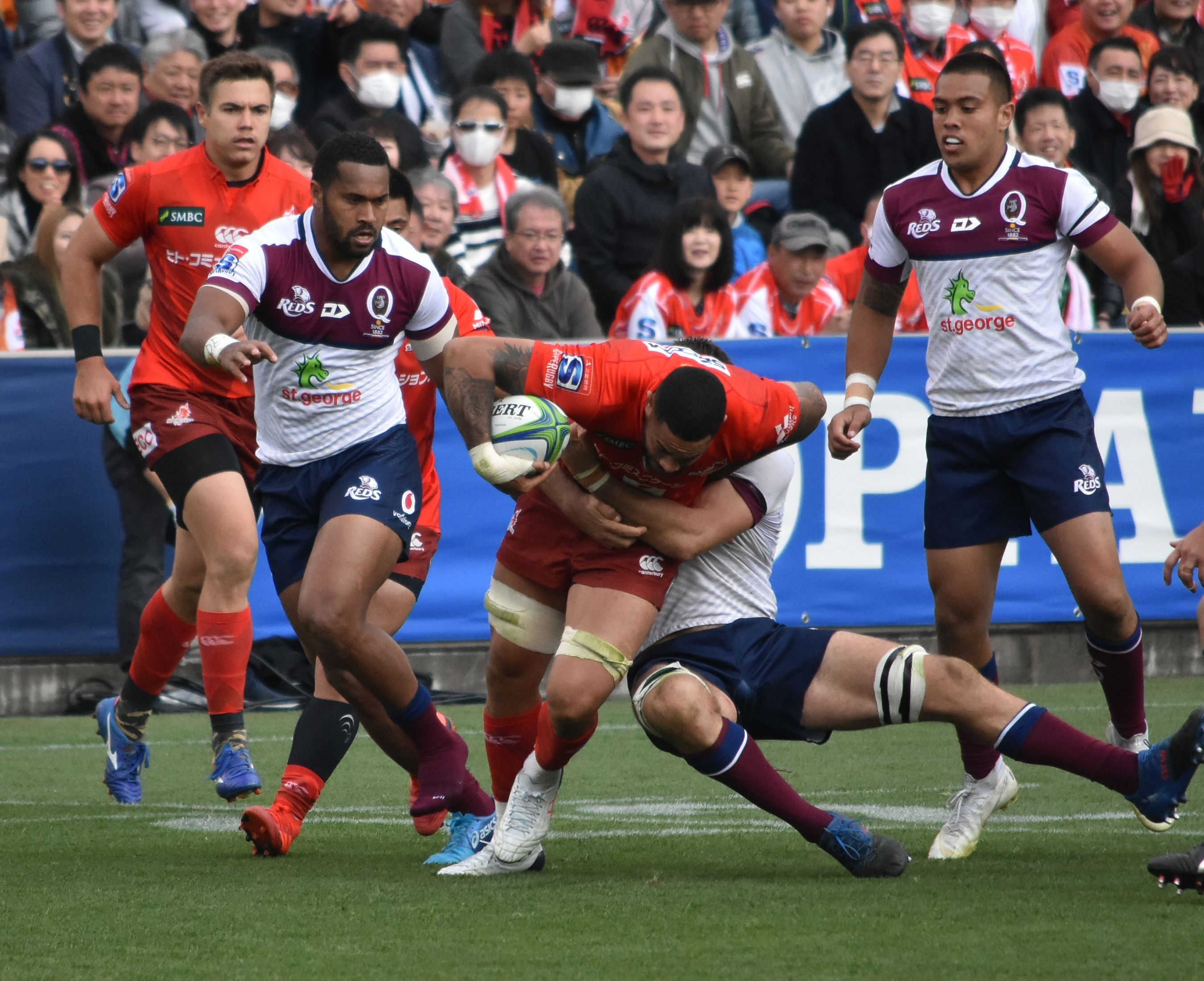
- Warren-Vosayaco in 2019
- Full name: Rahboni Warren-Vosayaco
- Born: 28 September 1995 (age 31) Australia
- Height: 1.88 m (6 ft 2 in)
- Weight: 105 kg (16 st 7 lb; 231 lb)
- School: Endeavour Sports High School

Rugby union career
- Position(s): Flanker, Number 8, Centre, Wing
- Current team: Kyuden Voltex
Amateur team(s)
Years	Team	Apps	(Points)
2014–2016	Southern Districts	16	(20)
Senior career
Years	Team	Apps	(Points)
2016–2018	NTT Comms Shining Arcs	20	(30)
2020–2021	Munakata Sanix Blues	7	(5)
2023-2025	Brive	31	(25)
2025-	Kyuden Voltex	11	(5)
- Correct as of 3 March 2025
Super Rugby
Years	Team	Apps	(Points)
2017–2019	Sunwolves	24	(30)
2021-2022	Waratahs	9	(5)
2023	Western Force	9	(0)
- Correct as of 21 February 2021

Rahboni Warren-Vosayaco (born 28 September 1995) is an Australian and rugby union player and professional who plays as a Flanker. He currently plays for Sunwolves in Super Rugby and Munakata Sanix Blues in Japan's domestic Top League.
