= Graham Cooper (rugby union) =

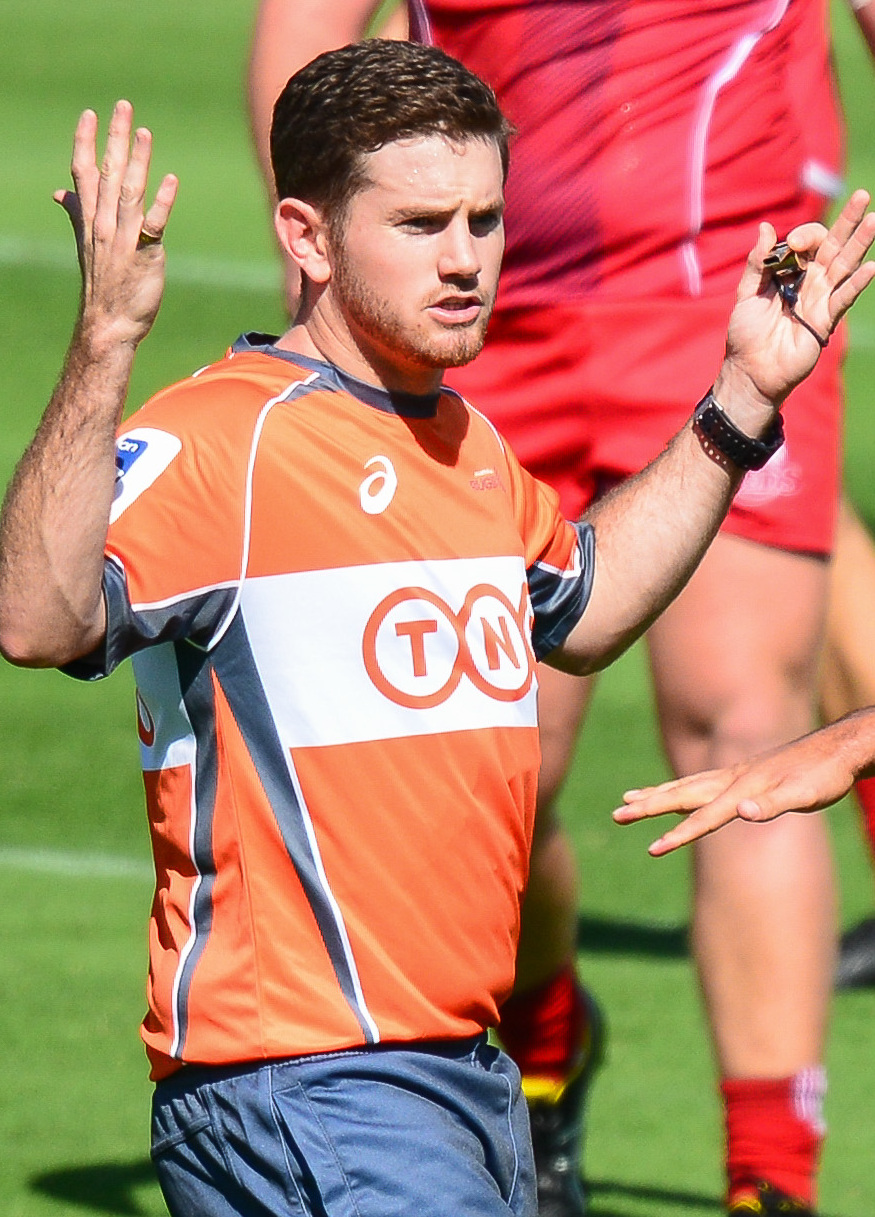
- Cooper officiating an U20s match in 2016
- Born: Graham Cooper; 1989 (age 36–37) Johannesburg, Transvaal, South Africa

Rugby union career
Refereeing career
Years	Competition	Apps
2015–pres.	National Rugby Championship	
2017	Women's Rugby World Cup	
2020–pres.	Super Rugby	
- Correct as of 18 February 2021

Graham Cooper (born 1989) is an Australian professional rugby union referee.

== Refereeing career ==
He has been a member of Rugby Australia's match officials panel since 2015, having previously refereed in Western Australia and worked in development for Rugby WA. In 2017, he was selected to officiate the 2017 Women's Rugby World Cup. In 2020, following the COVID-19 pandemic causing the cancellation of the 2020 Super Rugby season and regional tournaments being created in its place, Cooper made his Super Rugby refereeing debut, having previously only been an assistant in Super Rugby, in the match between the Rebels and Brumbies on 7 August 2020 in the 2020 Super Rugby AU competition. He was appointed to the officiating list for the 2021 Super Rugby AU season in February 2021.
