= Reesjan Pasitoa =

Australian rugby union player (born 2001)

- Born: 3 December 2001 (age 24) Perth, Western Australia, Australia
- Height: 185 cm (6 ft 1 in)
- Weight: 96 kg (212 lb; 15 st 2 lb)
- School: St Joseph's College, Nudgee

Rugby union career
- Position(s): Fly-half, Centre
Provincial / State sides
Years	Team	Apps	(Points)
2025–	Northland	7	(10)
- Correct as of 28 September 2025
Super Rugby
Years	Team	Apps	(Points)
2020–2021	ACT Brumbies	10	(2)
2022–2025	Force	20	(10)
2026–	Highlanders	1	(0)
- Correct as of 19 November 2025
International career
Years	Team	Apps	(Points)
2018–2019	Australia Schoolboys	6	(31)
- Correct as of 4 October 2019

Reesjan Pasitoa (born 3 December 2001) is an Australian professional rugby union player. He currently plays for the Highlanders in Super Rugby, having previously played for the Brumbies and the Western Force. His usual position is fly-half.

== Early life and junior rugby ==
Born and raised in Perth, Western Australia, Reesjan Pasitoa played his junior rugby with the Perth-Bayswater Rugby Club and Trinity College, East Perth. Pasitoa's father was born in Niue in the Pacific, while his mother hails from Germany. He moved to Queensland in 2017 to attend St Joseph's College, Nudgee on a rugby scholarship for his final three years of school. Pasitoa guided Nudgee to consecutive GPS premierships in 2017 and 2018, kicking the game-winning goal against arch-rivals Gregory Terrace in his first season.

He was selected for the 2018 Australian Schools & Under-18 team and played in Brisbane against Tonga and New Zealand, before playing on their successful Northern Hemisphere tour against Scotland and Ireland. In the following year, he steered the team to away victories over Fiji and New Zealand in Hamilton. Overall, Pasitoa received six caps for the team across 2018 and 2019.

== Career ==
Pasitoa joined the ACT Brumbies squad in Canberra ahead of the 2020 season. He had actually signed with the team in late 2018 but still had one year of school left to complete. He made his Super Rugby debut for the Brumbies in February 2020 from the bench in their third round match against the Highlanders.

He signed with the Western Force after the 2021 season, in a return home to Perth where he had first started playing rugby.

In June 2025, it was revealed in Australian sports news website The Roar, that Pasitoa would play for Northland in New Zealand's National Provincial Championship at the conclusion of the 2025 Super Rugby Pacific season.

In early November 2025, Pasitoa was named in the Highlanders' squad ahead of the 2026 Super Rugby season.
