= Sam Darry =

NZ international rugby union player

- Full name: Sam Darry
- Born: 18 July 2000 (age 26) New Zealand
- Height: 203 cm (6 ft 8 in)
- Weight: 110 kg (17 st 5 lb; 240 lb)

Rugby union career
- Position: Lock
- Current team: Canterbury, Blues
Senior career
Years	Team	Apps	(Points)
2020–	Canterbury	37	(20)
2021–	Blues	34	(45)
- Correct as of 5 November 2024
International career
Years	Team	Apps	(Points)
2024–	New Zealand	8	(5)
- Correct as of 5 November 2024

Sam Darry is a New Zealand rugby union player who plays as a lock for the Blues in Super Rugby and Canterbury in the National Provincial Championship.

== International career ==
On 20 July 2024, Darry made his debut for New Zealand against Fiji. On 10 August 2024, he scored his first international try against Argentina.
