= Teti Tela =

Fijian rugby union player (born 1991)

- Full name: Teti Jeremiah Tela
- Born: 7 March 1991 (age 35) Levuka, Ovalau, Fiji
- Height: 176 cm (5 ft 9 in)
- Weight: 90 kg (198 lb; 14 st 2 lb)
- School: Redbank Plains State High School

Rugby union career
- Position(s): Fly-half, Centre
- Current team: Fijian Drua
Senior career
Years	Team	Apps	(Points)
2015–2017	Queensland Country	10	(10)
2016–2017	Getxo	16	(22)
2018	Reds	1	(0)
2019	Brisbane City	7	(15)
2020	Fijian Latui	1	(7)
2022–	Fijian Drua	10	(93)
- Correct as of 10 June 2022
International career
Years	Team	Apps	(Points)
2011	Fiji U20	5	(0)
2021	Fiji	1	(0)
- Correct as of 10 February 2022

Teti Tela (born 7 March 1991) is a Fijian rugby union player who plays for the Fijian Drua in the Super Rugby competition. His position of choice is fly-half.

He made his debut for Fiji against the Barbarians in November 2019.
