= Ryan Lonergan =

Australian international rugby union footballer

- Born: 6 April 1998 (age 28) Canberra, Australian Capital Territory, Australia
- Height: 1.84 m (6 ft 0 in)
- Weight: 80 kg (176 lb; 12 st 8 lb)
- School: Trinity Christian School

Rugby union career
- Position: Scrum-half
- Current team: ACT Brumbies
Senior career
Years	Team	Apps	(Points)
2017–2020	Canberra Vikings	25	(92)
2017–	ACT Brumbies	107	(311)
- Correct as of 5 June 2026
International career
Years	Team	Apps	(Points)
2016	Australia U18	2	(8)
2018	Australia U20	5	(41)
2022	Australia A	5	(50)
2025–	Australia	15	(77)
- Correct as of 17 October 2026

Ryan Lonergan (born 6 April 1998) is an Australian professional rugby union player who plays as a scrum-half for Super Rugby club the ACT Brumbies and the Australia national rugby team. He is the brother of Wallabies and Brumbies hooker Lachlan Lonergan.

== Professional career ==
Lonergan's junior representative career began in 2016 after he was selected for the Australian Schoolboys rugby union team in a tour of New Zealand and Samoa.. In the following year, he played for the Australia national under-20 rugby union team in the 2017 Oceania Rugby Under 20 Championship.

After finishing high school at Trinity Christian School in 2016, Lonergan was signed to a two-year contract by the ACT Brumbies.. He made his Super Rugby debut for the Brumbies in 2017 in a match against the Chiefs in Hamilton, New Zealand.

On 10 April 2026, Lonergan played his milestone 100th game for the Brumbies in Round 9 of the 2026 Super Rugby Pacific season. He scored a try and kicked two conversions to help the Brumbies to a 14-10 victory over the Highlanders at Forsyth Barr Stadium.

== International career ==
On 27 September 2025, Lonergan made his Wallabies debut in the Bledisloe Cup match against the All Blacks at Eden Park. Lonergan came off the bench to replace injured scrum-half Tate McDermott in the 17th minute of the game.

Lonergan scored his first try for the Wallabies in his first run-on-start for the team on 4 July 2026 in the 2026 Nations Championship against Ireland at Allianz Stadium. He was replaced by Tate McDermott in the 33rd minute of the game due to injury while the Wallabies were leading 24-12, with Ireland eventually winning 33-31.
