= Josh Dickson =

New Zealand rugby union player (born 1994)

- Full name: Joshua McKenzie Dickson
- Born: 2 November 1994 (age 32) Perth, Australia
- Height: 200 cm (6 ft 7 in)
- Weight: 117 kg (258 lb; 18 st 6 lb)
- School: Otago Boys' High School

Rugby union career
- Position(s): Lock, Flanker
- Current team: Kintetsu Liners
Senior career
Years	Team	Apps	(Points)
2014–2023	Otago	70	(45)
2017–2023	Highlanders	55	(25)
2023–2026	Toyota Verblitz	43	(30)
2026–	Kintetsu Liners		
- Correct as of 22 June 2023
International career
Years	Team	Apps	(Points)
2014	New Zealand U20	2	(0)
2021–2022	Māori All Blacks	3	(0)
2022	All Blacks XV	1	(0)
- Correct as of 5 November 2022

Joshua McKenzie Dickson (born 2 November 1994) is a New Zealand rugby union player who currently plays as a lock for Otago in New Zealand's domestic National Provincial Championship (NPC) and for the Highlanders in the international Super Rugby competition.

== Early career ==
Born in Perth, Western Australia, Dickson was raised in New Zealand and attended Otago Boys' High School.

== Senior career ==
He made his senior debut playing for the Otago Razorbacks in the 2014 ITM Cup where he made 3 substitute appearances before becoming more of a regular the following year, featuring in 9 games, 7 of which were from the start and scoring 2 tries. 2016 was a pretty good year for the Razorbacks as they reached the Championship final before losing to North Harbour and Dickson was a key player for them in the second row, making a career-high 10 appearances. Dickson made 50 games for Otago in 2019.

== Super Rugby ==
Solid performances for Otago over the course of three provincial seasons put him on the radar of 2015 Super Rugby champions, the Highlanders, and he was signed to a contract with the franchise ahead of the 2017 season.

== International ==
Dickson was a member of the New Zealand Under 20 side which competed in the 2014 IRB Junior World Championship in his home country where he made 2 appearances as the Junior All Blacks finished in 3rd place.

== Personal life ==
Dickson is an Australian of Māori descent (Ngāi Tahu descent).
