= Brendon Pickerill =

New Zealand rugby union referee

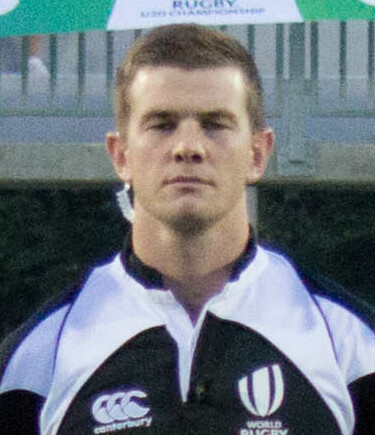
- Brendon Pickerill
- Born: Brendon Ernest Pickerill; 20 June 1989 (age 37) Christchurch, New Zealand

Rugby union career
Refereeing career
Years	Competition	Apps
2017–present	Test matches	

Brendon Pickerill (born 20 June 1989) is a New Zealand Rugby Union referee.

Before becoming a professional referee, Pickerill earned his bachelor's degree in Civil Engineering and Commerce and went on to work in project management in the construction industry. He made his Super Rugby debut in 2016 and Test rugby debut in 2017.

He is one of seven designated Assistant referees for the 2019 Rugby World Cup.
