= Lachlan Lonergan =

Australian rugby union player

- Born: 11 October 1999 (age 27) Australia
- Height: 180 cm (5 ft 11 in)
- Weight: 99 kg (218 lb; 15 st 8 lb)
- Notable relative: Ryan Lonergan (brother) Mitch Lonergan (brother)

Rugby union career
- Position: Hooker
Senior career
Years	Team	Apps	(Points)
2019	Canberra Vikings	7	(5)
- Correct as of 4 November 2019
Super Rugby
Years	Team	Apps	(Points)
2020–	Brumbies	69	(90)
- Correct as of 5 June 2026
International career
Years	Team	Apps	(Points)
2019	Australia U20	5	(20)
2021–	Australia	8	(5)
- Correct as of 17 August 2023
Medal record
Men's rugby union
Representing Australia
Oceania U20 Championship
Winner	2019 Gold Coast
Junior World Cup
Runner-up	2019 Argentina

Lachlan Lonergan (born 11 October 1999) is an Australian professional rugby union player. He plays as a hooker for the Brumbies in Super Rugby and has represented Australia in international rugby.

== Rugby career ==
Lonergan played for the Australia U20 team at the World Rugby Under 20 Championship in 2019. He signed with the Brumbies later that year, joining his older brother Ryan, who had been with the franchise since 2018. Lachlan was named in the Brumbies squad for the 2020 season.

== Statistics ==
As of 17 August 2023

=== Super Rugby ===
Season	Team	Matches	Starts	Minutes	Tries	Cons	Pens	Points	YC	RC
2020	Brumbies	4	0	46	0	0	0	0	0	0
2021	Brumbies	13	4	471	3	0	0	15	0	0
2022	Brumbies	10	5	399	7	0	0	35	0	0
2023	Brumbies	13	10	716	5	0	0	25	0	0
Grand total		40	19	1632	15	0	0	75	0	0

=== Internationals ===
Season	Team	Matches	Starts	Minutes	Tries	Cons	Pens	Points	YC	RC
2021	Australia	4	0	63	0	0	0	0	0	0
2022	Australia	4	1	126	1	0	0	5	0	0
Grand total		8	1	189	1	0	0	5	0	0
