= Feleti Kaitu'u =

Australian rugby union player

- Born: Feleti Kaitu'u; 30 December 1994 (age 31) Newcastle, Australia
- Height: 183 cm (6 ft 0 in)
- Weight: 110 kg (240 lb; 17 st 5 lb)

Rugby union career
- Position: Hooker
- Current team: Racing 92
Senior career
Years	Team	Apps	(Points)
2016	Queensland Country	7	(6)
2018–2019	Force	8	(30)
2023	Tasman	11	(10)
2024–	Racing 92	16	(35)
- Correct as of 13 May 2025
Super Rugby
Years	Team	Apps	(Points)
2020–2024	Force	48	(20)
- Correct as of 26 May 2024
International career
Years	Team	Apps	(Points)
2014	Australia U20	1	(0)
2021	Australia	3	(0)
- Correct as of 20 July 2023

Feleti Kaitu'u (born 30 December 1994) is an Australian rugby union player who plays for the Racing 92 in Top 14. His position is hooker.

Kaitu'u was named in Australia's team for the 2021 Rugby Championship match against South Africa, played on the Gold Coast. He made his test debut in the 65th minute of the match as Australia won 28–26 against the World Cup champions.
