= 2024 Bunnings NPC =

2024 rugby union competition in New Zealand

2024 Bunnings NPC season
- Countries: New Zealand
- Date: 9 August – 26 October 2024
- Champions: Wellington
- Runners-up: Bay of Plenty
- Matches played: 77
- Tries scored: 617 (average 8 per match)
- Top point scorer: Tane Edmed (North Harbour); 137 points
- Top try scorer: Kade Banks (North Harbour); 10 tries

Official website
- www.provincial.rugby

The 2024 Bunnings NPC season was the 19th season of New Zealand's provincial rugby union competition, the National Provincial Championship, since it turned professional in 2006. It involved the top 14 provincial rugby unions of New Zealand. For sponsorship reasons, the competition is known as the Bunnings NPC. The regular season began on 9 August 2024, when 2023 champions Taranaki hosted Counties Manukau. The final took place on 26 October 2024, and saw Wellington beat Bay of Plenty 23–20 after extra time. The Ranfurly Shield changed hands twice during the season: Hawke's Bay came into the season as holders and survived two challenges before relinquishing it to Tasman in week 5 in a 25–24 loss; Tasman then survived two more challenges before losing the shield to Taranaki in the final week of the regular season, losing 42–29.

== Format ==
Under the current competition format, which is a continuation of that of 2023, the 14 provincial unions participating in the Bunnings NPC are grouped in one single division, ranked on one single competition table and play for one NPC title.

All provincial teams play ten games during the regular season (round robin): five games are played at the provincial union's home ground and five games are away games. The seven teams that finished the previous season in 1st, 3rd, 5th, 7th, 9th, 11th and 13th place will play each other as well as four cross-over matches against the teams that finished 2nd, 4th, 6th, 8th, 10th, 12th and 14th. Likewise, the teams that finished 2nd, 4th, 6th, 8th, 10th, 12th and 14th will also play each other as well as four cross-over games against the provinces that were ranked 1st, 3rd, 5th, 7th, 9th, 11th or 13th at the end of the previous season. The ten round robin games in 2024 are played over a period of nine weeks (starting on Friday 9 August 2024) and include one mid-week game to be played on a Wednesday night.

The regular season is followed by quarter-finals to be played by the eight highest ranked teams on the competition table. The finals rankings are determined by the number of competition points earned during the regular season. Competition points can be gained in the following way: four points are awarded to the winning team, two points to each team for a draw, and no points for a loss. Teams can also receive a bonus point if they score four or more tries in a match, or lose by seven points or less.

If two or more provincial teams finish with an equal number of competition points, the following tiebreaker rules apply. If two unions are tied, the union which has defeated the other in a head-to-head is placed higher. In case of a draw between them, the side with the biggest points difference is ranked higher. If three or more unions are tied and they have all played each other, the team with most competition points in that year against the other tied unions is ranked higher; if they have not all played each other, the team with the biggest points difference in the round robin is ranked higher. In all cases, if these unions are still tied, the ranking is decided by the highest number of tries scored, the most points scored, or a coin toss.

The quarter-finals are played as follows, with the highest-ranked team hosting:

QF 1: 1 v 8;
QF 2: 2 v 7;
QF 3: 3 v 6; and
QF 4: 4 v 5.

In the semi-finals, the highest-ranked quarter-final winner hosts the lowest-ranked quarter-final winner and the second highest-ranked quarter-final winner hosts the third highest-ranked quarter-final winner.

The NPC Final will be played between the two semi-final winners, again at the home venue of the team with the higher finals ranking.

The rules governing Ranfurly Shield Challenges state that every home game during the regular season played by the union that holds the Ranfurly Shield is a mandatory challenge match. No challenge matches will be played after the regular season has ended (i.e., during the finals). A holder who competes in the Bunnings NPC must also accept at least two challenges from unions competing in the Heartland Championship, including a challenge lodged by the winner of the Meads Cup at the end of the previous season. These non-mandatory challenge matches must be played before the start of the NPC season.

== Standings ==
Pos	Team	Pld	W	D	L	PF	PA	PD	TF	TA	TB	LB	Pts	Qualification
1	Wellington (C)	10	8	0	2	311	264	+47	44	37	8	0	40	Bunnings NPC quarter-finals
2	Taranaki (RS)	10	8	0	2	325	239	+86	46	35	7	1	40	Bunnings NPC quarter-finals
3	Tasman	10	8	0	2	329	216	+113	41	29	6	0	38	Bunnings NPC quarter-finals
4	Bay of Plenty (RU)	10	7	0	3	350	238	+112	51	32	8	2	38	Bunnings NPC quarter-finals
5	Hawke's Bay	10	6	0	4	304	345	−41	47	45	8	1	33	Bunnings NPC quarter-finals
6	Canterbury	10	6	0	4	276	294	−18	39	38	5	1	30	Bunnings NPC quarter-finals
7	Waikato	10	5	0	5	300	246	+54	41	35	6	2	28	Bunnings NPC quarter-finals
8	Counties Manukau	10	5	0	5	299	287	+12	41	43	7	1	28	Bunnings NPC quarter-finals
9	Otago	10	5	0	5	256	275	−19	31	37	4	2	26	
10	North Harbour	10	3	0	7	367	341	+26	50	51	8	4	24	
11	Auckland	10	3	0	7	251	283	−32	35	37	5	4	21	
12	Southland	10	3	0	7	248	312	−64	37	44	4	1	17	
13	Northland	10	2	0	8	250	329	−79	35	50	4	3	15	
14	Manawatu	10	1	0	9	222	419	−197	33	58	5	1	10	

Source: Bunnings NPC fixtures & standings 2024
(C) Champions; (RU) Runners-up; (RS) Ranfurly Shield holders

=== Standings progression ===
Each team's cumulative points total is shown for every week of the regular season with the overall log position in brackets.

Team	W1	W2	W3	W4	W5	W6	W7	W8	W9	QF	SF	Final
Auckland	0 (10th)	1 (13th)	2 (12th)	2 (13th)	7 (12th)	12 (10th)	17 (10th)	19 (11th)	21 (11th)	DNQ	DNQ	DNQ
Bay of Plenty	10 (1st)	15 (1st)	17 (2nd)	17 (4th)	22 (4th)	27 (3rd)	28 (4th)	33 (4th)	38 (4th)	Won	Won	Lost
Canterbury	5 (4th)	5 (7th)	10 (6th)	10 (9th)	15 (7th)	20 (7th)	25 (6th)	25 (7th)	30 (6th)	Won	Lost	DNQ
Counties Manukau	1 (9th)	2 (12th)	2 (13th)	7 (12th)	12 (9th)	17 (8th)	18 (8th)	23 (8th)	28 (8th)	Lost	DNQ	DNQ
Hawke's Bay	5 (5th)	10 (2nd)	20 (1st)	25 (1st)	27 (2nd)	27 (4th)	27 (5th)	32 (5th)	33 (5th)	Lost	DNQ	DNQ
Manawatu	0 (14th)	0 (14th)	1 (14th)	2 (14th)	2 (14th)	7 (14th)	7 (14th)	9 (14th)	10 (14th)	DNQ	DNQ	DNQ
North Harbour	1 (8th)	2 (11th)	7 (8th)	9 (10th)	11 (10th)	16 (9th)	18 (9th)	23 (9th)	24 (---)	DNQ	DNQ	DNQ
Northland	0 (12th)	5 (6th)	5 (11th)	7 (11th)	7 (13th)	8 (13th)	13 (12th)	13 (12th)	15 (13th)	DNQ	DNQ	DNQ
Otago	0 (11th)	4 (10th)	9 (7th)	10 (7th)	12 (8th)	12 (12th)	16 (11th)	21 (10th)	26 (9th)	DNQ	DNQ	DNQ
Southland	4 (7th)	4 (9th)	5 (10th)	10 (8th)	10 (11th)	12 (11th)	12 (13th)	12 (13th)	17 (12th)	DNQ	DNQ	DNQ
Taranaki	5 (3rd)	6 (5th)	11 (5th)	15 (6th)	20 (5th)	20 (6th)	30 (3rd)	35 (3rd)	40 (2nd)	Lost	DNQ	DNQ
Tasman	5 (2nd)	9 (4th)	14 (4th)	19 (3rd)	23 (3rd)	28 (2nd)	32 (2nd)	37 (1st)	38 (3rd)	Lost	DNQ	DNQ
Waikato	0 (13th)	5 (8th)	6 (9th)	16 (5th)	17 (6th)	22 (5th)	23 (7th)	28 (6th)	28 (7th)	Won	Lost	DNQ
Wellington	5 (6th)	10 (3rd)	15 (3rd)	20 (2nd)	30 (1st)	30 (1st)	35 (1st)	35 (2nd)	40 (1st)	Won	Won	Won
Key:	Win	Draw	Loss	No game	DNQ = did not qualify							

== Regular season ==
In the regular season of the 2024 Bunnings NPC, each team plays 10 games over a period of nine weeks, including one mid-week game. The competition started on 9 August 2024, when Taranaki beat Counties Manukau 31–15 in New Plymouth. The first Ranfurly Shield defence of the season took place on 17 August 2024, when Hawke's Bay beat Southland 31–17 in Napier.

=== Week 1 ===
9 August 2024
17:35 NZST

Taranaki	31–15	Counties Manukau
Try: Kini Naholo (2) 11', 33'; Josh Jacomb (2) 40', 41'; Jackson Morgan 53'; Con: Josh Jacomb (3/5) 12', 34', 54'; Cards: Michael Bent (yellow card) 70'	Report	Try: Gibson Popoali'i 57'; Hoskins Sotutu 70'; Con: Kali Hala (1/2) 71'; Pen: Riley Hohepa (1/1) 4'; Cards: Liam Daniela (yellow card) 31'

Yarrow Stadium, New Plymouth
Referee: Stuart Curran

9 August 2024
19:35 NZST

Auckland	21–29	Wellington
Try: Nigel Ah Wong 22'; Akira Ioane 47'; Anton Segner 76'; Con: Alex Harford (2/2) 23', 47'; Zarn Sullivan (1/1) 77'	Report	Try: Kyle Preston 15'; Tjay Clarke 35'; Peter Umaga-Jensen 40'; Du'Plessis Kirifi 61'; Con: Jackson Garden-Bachop (3/4) 16', 40+1', 62'; Pen: Jackson Garden-Bachop (1/2) 52'

Eden Park, Auckland
Referee: Mike Winter

10 August 2024
14:05 NZST

Canterbury	34–21	Northland
Try: Brodie McAlister (3) 12', 40+3', 45'; Jamie Hannah 20'; Ben Funnell (2) 55', 69'; Con: Isaac Hutchinson (1/3) 40+4'; James White (1/1) 70'	Report	Try: Chris Apoua 3'; Tevita Latu 37'; Heremaia Murray 50'; Con: Rivez Reihana (3/3) 4', 38', 52'

Apollo Projects Stadium, Christchurch
Referee: Jackson Henshaw

10 August 2024
14:05 NZST

Southland	22–13	Otago
Try: Blair Ryall 38'; Viliami Fine 51'; Isaac Te Tamaki 69'; Con: Byron Smith (2/3) 39', 70'; Pen: Byron Smith (1/2) 21'	Report	Try: Liam Cotlman 57'; Con: Cam Millar (1/1) 58'; Pen: Cam Millar (2/3) 25', 40+2'

Rugby Park, Invercargill
Referee: James Doleman

10 August 2024
16:35 NZST

Waikato	21–36	Bay of Plenty
Try: Quinn Tupaea 10'; Laghlan McWhannell 62'; Josh Moorby 78'; Con: D'Angelo Leuila (1/1) 11'; Taha Kemara (2/2) 62', 78'	Report	Try: Joe Johnston (2) 14', 46'; Cody Vai 21'; Emoni Narawa 30'; Seamus Bardoul 67'; Con: Kaleb Trask (4/5) 15', 22', 47', 68'; Pen: Kaleb Trask (1/1) 40+2'

FMG Stadium Waikato, Hamilton
Referee: Angus Mabey

11 August 2024
14:05 NZST

North Harbour	32–41	Hawke's Bay
Try: Kade Banks (2) 6', 56'; Karl Ruzich 17'; Sofai Maka 45'; Shaun Stevenson 62'; Con: Tane Edmed (2/5) 18', 63'; Pen: Tane Edmed (1/1) 38'	Report	Try: Folau Fakatava 32'; Tim Farrell 53'; Geoff Cridge 59'; Kianu Kereru-Symes 65'; Frank Lochore 68'; Nick Grigg 76'; Con: Harry Godfrey (1/1) 33'; Lincoln McClutchie (2/4) 66', 69'; Danny Toala (1/1) 77'; Pen: Lincoln McClutchie (1/1) 80'

North Harbour Stadium, Albany
Referee: Ben O'Keeffe

11 August 2024
16:35 NZST

Manawatu	21–54	Tasman
Try: Brett Cameron 35'; James Tofa 63'; TK Howden 68'; Con: Brett Cameron (3/3) 36', 63', 68'	Report	Try: Max Hicks (2) 7', 11'; Timoci Tavatavanawai (2) 17', 21'; Finlay Christie 25'; Levi Aumua 58'; Sione Havili Talitui 65'; Jack Gray 70'; Con: William Havili (6/7) 8', 12', 18', 22', 26', 65'; Campbell Parata (1/1) 71'

Central Energy Trust Arena, Palmerston North
Referee: Daniel Waenga

14 August 2024
19:05 NZST

Bay of Plenty	44–31	Counties Manukau
Try: Nikora Broughton (2) 12', 46'; Cody Vai 24'; Cole Forbes (2) 32', 40+5'; Joe Johnston 55'; Con: Lucas Cashmore (4/6) 13', 33', 40+6', 47'; Pen: Lucas Cashmore (1/1) 3'; Junior Matautia (1/1] 63'	Report	Try: Alamanda Motuga 16'; Hoskins Sotutu 50'; Josh Gray 67'; Tevita Ofa 80'; Con: Tevita Ofa (4/4) 17', 51', 68', 80'; Pen: Tevita Ofa (1/1) 5'; Cards: Cam Church (yellow card) 23'; Peniasi Malimali (yellow card) 40+4'

Rotorua International Stadium, Rotorua
Referee: Marcus Playle

=== Week 2 ===
16 August 2024
19:05 NZST

Otago	27–25	Auckland
Try: Josh Whaanga 2'; Will Stodart 40'; Sam Gilbert 51'; Con: Cam Millar (3/3) 4', 40+1', 52'; Pen: Cam Millar (2/2) 30', 63'	Report	Try: Josh Beehre 14'; Nigel Ah Wong 46'; Tanielu Teleʻa 75'; Con: Christian Leali'ifano (1/2) 15'; Xavi Taele (1/1) 76'; Pen: Christian Leali'ifano (2/2) 9', 27'

Forsyth Barr Stadium, Dunedin
Referee: Jackson Henshaw

17 August 2024
14:05 NZST

Northland	35–18	Manawatu
Try: Simon Parker 18'; Heremaia Murray 30'; Penalty try 75'; Nathan Salmon 80'; Con: Rivez Reihana (2/2) 19', 32'; Pen: Rivez Reihana (2/2) 11', 61'; Daniel Hawkins (1/1) 69'	Report	Try: James Tofa 43'; Vernon Bason 77'; Con: Brett Cameron (1/2) 44'; Pen: Brett Cameron (2/2) 15', 55'

Semenoff Stadium, Whangārei
Referee: Angus Mabey

17 August 2024
14:05 NZST

Tasman	22–7	Canterbury
Try: Sam Moli 20'; Con: William Havili (1/1) 22'; Pen: William Havili (5/6) 4', 35', 58', 65', 68'	Report	Try: Ngane Punivai 46'; Con: Isaac Hutchinson (1/1) 47'; Cards: Willi Heinz (yellow card) 71'

Trafalgar Park, Nelson
Referee: James Doleman

17 August 2024
16:35 NZST

RS – Hawke's Bay	31–17	Southland
Try: Mat Protheroe 32'; Nick Grigg 40'; Frank Lochore 59'; Sam Wye 80'; Con: Lincoln McClutchie (1/3) 80+1'; Pen: Lincoln McClutchie (3/3) 7', 19', 71'	Report	Try: Morgan Mitchell 21'; Isaac Te Tamaki 76'; Con: Byron Smith (1/1) 22'; Jason Robertson (1/1) 77'; Pen: Byron Smith (1/1) 52'

McLean Park, Napier
Referee: Stuart Curran

18 August 2024
14:05 NZST

Bay of Plenty	24–20	North Harbour
Try: Emoni Narawa 22'; Reon Paul (2) 33', 63'; Joe Johnston 52'; Con: Kaleb Trask (2/4) 34', 53'	Report	Try: Shaun Stevenson 35'; Sione Mafileo 49'; Con: Tane Edmed (2/2) 37', 50'; Pen: Tane Edmed (2/2) 5', 45'

Tauranga Domain, Tauranga
Referee: Jonathan Bredin

18 August 2024
14:05 NZST

Wellington	26–19	Taranaki
Try: Tjay Clarke 25'; Julian Savea (2) 51', 65'; Leni Apisai 79'; Pen: Jackson Garden-Bachop (2/2) 41', 48'	Report	Try: Ricky Riccitelli 3'; Jacob Ratumaitavuki-Kneepkens 21'; Tom Franklin 36'; Con: Josh Jacomb (2/3) 22', 37'

Jerry Collins Stadium, Porirua
Referee: Fraser Hannon

18 August 2024
16:35 NZST

Counties Manukau	20–26	Waikato
Try: Simon-Peter Toleafoa 2'; Adam Brash 8'; Con: AJ Alatimu (2/2) 3', 9'; Pen: AJ Alatimu (2/2) 28', 71'; Cards: William Furniss (yellow card) 33'	Report	Try: Austin Anderson 6'; Patrick McCurran 20'; Senita Lauaki 34'; Laghlan McWhannell 50'; Con: Taha Kemara (3/4) 21', 36', 51'; Cards: Taha Kemara (yellow card) 80'

Navigation Homes Stadium, Pukekohe
Referee: Ben O'Keeffe

=== Week 3 ===
23 August 2024
19:05 NZST

RS – Hawke's Bay	55–30	Northland
Try: Jacob Devery 21'; Lincoln McClutchie (2) 28', 43'; Ben O'Donnell (2) 34', 52'; Sam Smith (2) 40', 56'; Tyrone Thompson 67'; Mat Protheroe 73’ Con: Lincoln McClutchie (5/8) 22', 29', 40+1', 44', 57'	Report	Try: Tevita Latu 24'; Matt Moulds 47'; Sam Nock 64'; Con: Rivez Reihana (3/3) 25', 48', 65'; Pen: Rivez Reihana (3/3) 3', 11', 18'

McLean Park, Napier
Referee: Marcus Playle

24 August 2024
14:05 NZST

Counties Manukau	3–48	Tasman
Pen: AJ Alatimu (1/1) 24'; Cards: James Thompson (yellow card) 45'	Report	Try: Timoci Tavatavanawai 8'; Quentin MacDonald (2) 43', 47'; Levi Aumua 50'; Quinten Strange 70'; Macca Springer 73'; Kyren Taumoefolau 79'; Con: William Havili (4/4) 9', 44', 48', 51'; Campbell Parata (1/3) 75'; Pen: William Havili (1/1) 40'

Navigation Homes Stadium, Pukekohe
Referee: Mike Winter

24 August 2024
16:35 NZST

Auckland	21–27	Canterbury
Try: Christian Leali'ifano 35'; Nigel Ah Wong 46'; Kemara Hauiti-Parapara 62'; Con: Xavi Taele (3/3) 36', 47', 63'	Report	Try: Jone Rova 37'; Daniel Lienert-Brown 57'; Con: James White (1/2) 58'; Pen: James White (5/6) 7', 18', 43', 54', 67'

Eden Park, Auckland
Referee: Ben O'Keeffe

24 August 2024
19:05 NZST

Southland	24–39	Taranaki
Try: Sean Withy 3'; Jake Strachan 17'; Faletoi Peni 62'; Dylan Nel 71'; Con: Byron Smith (2/4) 63', 71'	Report	Try: Ricky Riccitelli 8'; Adam Lennox 20'; Tom Franklin 31'; Kini Naholo 40'; Josh Setu 64'; Con: Josh Jacomb (4/5) 10', 21', 32', 65'; Pen: Josh Jacomb (2/2) 2', 75'; Cards: Jackson Morgan (yellow card) 70'

Rugby Park, Invercargill
Referee: Nick Hogan

25 August 2024
14:05 NZST

Otago	31–26	Bay of Plenty
Try: Finn Hurley 15'; Hudson Creighton 24'; Oliver Haig (2) 63', 74'; Con: Cam Millar (4/4) 16', 25', 64', 76'; Pen: Cam Millar (1/2) 47'	Report	Try: Jacob Norris 10'; Taine Kolose (2) 20', 53'; Justin Sangster 50'; Con: Kaleb Trask (3/4) 11', 22', 51'; Cards: Jacob Norris (yellow card) 63'

Forsyth Barr Stadium, Dunedin
Referee: Todd Petrie

25 August 2024
14:05 NZST

Wellington	39–31	Manawatu
Try: Peter Lakai (2) 14', 66'; Pepesana Patafilo 20'; Riley Higgins 51'; Tjay Clarke 73'; Con: Jackson Garden-Bachop (4/5) 15', 21', 52', 74'; Pen: Jackson Garden-Bachop (2/2) 39', 80'; Cards: Du'Plessis Kirifi (yellow card) 31'	Report	Try: James Tofa 23'; Raymond Tuputupu 33'; Liam O'Connor 36'; Taniela Filimone 44'; Kyle Brown 58'; Con: Reece MacDonald (3/3) 24', 45', 59'

Jerry Collins Stadium, Porirua
Referee: Jonathan Bredin

25 August 2024
16:35 NZST

North Harbour	43–29	Waikato
Try: Kade Banks (4) 27', 56', 62', 74'; Shaun Stevenson 29'; Sofai Maka 51'; Con: Tane Edmed (5/6) 28', 30', 57', 64', 75'; Pen: Tane Edmed (1/1) 47'; Cards: Tane Edmed (yellow card) 78'	Report	Try: Daniel Sinkinson 35'; Josh Moorby 49'; George Dyer 54'; Penalty try 78'; Con: Aaron Cruden (2/2) 50', 55'; Pen: Taha Kemara (1/1) 24'

North Harbour Stadium, Albany
Referee: Paul Williams

28 August 2024
19:05 NZST

Canterbury	21–27	Hawke's Bay
Try: Isaac Hutchinson 28'; Kurtis MacDonald 44'; Con: James White (1/2) 29'; Pen: James White (3/3) 7', 32', 70'	Report	Try: Freedom Vaha'akolo 11'; Danny Toala 18'; Neria Fomai 50'; Sam Wye 72'; Con: Harry Godfrey (2/2) 51', 72'; Pen: Lincoln McClutchie (1/1) 38'

Apollo Projects Stadium, Christchurch
Referee: Fraser Hannon

=== Week 4 ===
30 August 2024
19:05 NZST

Northland	26–31	Southland
Try: Sam Caird 10'; Jordan Trainor 25'; Matt Moulds 35'; Tevita Latu 39'; Con: Rivez Reihana (3/4) 11', 36', 40'	Report	Try: Rory van Vugt (3) 16', 58', 67'; Charlie Powell (2) 49', 73'; Con: Jake Strachan (3/5) 17', 50', 59'

Semenoff Stadium, Whangārei
Referee: Todd Petrie

31 August 2024
14:05 NZST

North Harbour	33–36	Counties Manukau
Try: Bryn Hall 20'; Cameron Suafoa 26'; Sofai Maka 56'; Kade Banks64'; Cam Christie 73'; Con: Tane Edmed (4/5) 22', 27', 65', 74'	Report	Try: Etene Nanai-Seturo (2) 10', 15'; Adam Brash 36'; Jonathan Taumateine 45'; Simon-Peter Toleafoa 79'; Con: AJ Alatimu (3/4) 11', 16', 37'; Riley Hohepa (1/1) 46'; Pen: AJ Alatimu (1/2) 29'

North Harbour Stadium, Albany
Referee: Maggie Cogger-Orr

31 August 2024
14:35 NZST

Taranaki	22–18	Otago
Try: Jacob Ratumaitavuki-Kneepkens 59'; Ricky Riccitelli 68'; Pen: Josh Jacomb (4/4) 10', 28', 44', 48'	Report	Try: Jona Nareki 17'; Saula Ma'u 50'; Con: Cam Millar (1/2) 51'; Pen: Cam Millar (2/2) 36', 40+3'; Cards: Will Tucker (yellow card) 57'; Jona Nareki (yellow card) 75'

Yarrow Stadium, New Plymouth
Referee: Mike Winter

31 August 2024
16:35 NZST

Waikato	39–21	Auckland
Try: Daniel Sinkinson (3) 3', 20', 77'; Aaron Cruden 36'; Aki Tuivailala 40'; Con: Aaron Cruden (3/4) 4', 21', 38'; Tepaea Cook-Savage (1/1) 77'; Pen: Aaron Cruden (2/2) 16', 30'	Report	Try: Anton Segner 25'; Nigel Ah Wong 46'; Mills Sanerivi 59'; Con: Zarn Sullivan (3/3) 26', 47', 60'

FMG Stadium Waikato, Hamilton
Referee: Daniel Waenga

31 August 2024
19:05 NZST

Tasman	34–15	Bay of Plenty
Try: Timoci Tavatavanawai 7'; Max Hicks 14'; Jack Gray (2) 52', 63'; Con: William Havili (4/4) 7', 15', 53', 64'; Pen: William Havili (1/1) 25'; Will Butler (1/1) 44'; Cards: William Havili (yellow card) 38'	Report	Try: Emoni Narawa 34'; Cole Forbes 69'; Con: Lucas Cashmore (1/1) 70'; Pen: Kaleb Trask (1/1) 23'

Lansdowne Park, Blenheim
Referee: Nick Hogan

1 September 2024
14:05 NZST

Canterbury	21–46	Wellington
Try: James White 45'; Ngane Punivai 59'; Dallas McLeod 72'; Con: James White (3/3) 46', 60', 72'	Report	Try: Caleb Delany 10'; Kyle Preston 13'; Peter Umaga-Jensen (2) 31', 38'; Tjay Clarke 69'; Jackson Garden-Bachop 76'; Con: Callum Harkin (4/4) 11', 14', 32', 39'; Jackson Garden-Bachop (1/1) 77'; Pen: Callum Harkin (2/2) 40+2', 55'

Rangiora Showground Oval, Rangiora
Referee: Stuart Curran

1 September 2024
16:35 NZST

Manawatu	26–38	Hawke's Bay
Try: Raymond Tuputupu 6'; Reece MacDonald 14'; Jordi Viljoen 20'; Taniela Filimone 38'; Con: Reece MacDonald (2/3) 7', 21'; Liam O'Connor (1/1) 39'	Report	Try: Frank Lochore 22'; Pouri Rakete-Stones 34'; Folau Fakatava (2) 40+1', 67'; Danny Toala 43'; Nick Grigg 77'; Con: Danny Toala (3/4) 24', 35', 40+2'; Lincoln McClutchie (1/2) 68'

Central Energy Trust Arena, Palmerston North
Referee: Paul Williams

4 September 2024
19:05 NZST

Waikato	34–19	Northland
Try: Oli Mathis 6'; Quintony Ngatai 13'; Aki Tuivailala 21'; Xavier Roe 80'; Con: Tepaea Cook-Savage (4/4) 7', 13', 22', 80+1'; Pen: Tepaea Cook-Savage (2/2) 46', 67'	Report	Try: Nathan Salmon 3'; Lisati Milo-Harris 25'; Quinton Nichols 39'; Con: Daniel Hawkins (2/3) 26', 40+1'

FMG Stadium Waikato, Hamilton
Referee: Jono Bredin

=== Week 5 ===
6 September 2024
19:05 NZST

Bay of Plenty	68–14	Manawatu
Try: Semisi Paea 4'; Emoni Narawa 10'; Joe Johnston (2) 19', 28'; Nikora Broughton 40'; Cody Vai 46'; Te Toiroa Tahuriorangi 50'; Fehi Fineanganofo 65'; Taine Kolose (2) 74', 80'; Con: Kaleb Trask (9/10) 5', 11', 21', 29', 40+1', 47', 52', 66', 75'	Report	Try: TK Howden 23'; Taniela Filimone 32'; Con: Liam O'Connor (2/2) 24', 33'

Rotorua International Stadium, Rotorua
Referee: Todd Petrie

7 September 2024
14:05 NZST

Auckland	36–32	North Harbour
Try: Kemara Hauiti-Parapara 36'; Soane Vikena 55'; Caleb Tangitau (2) 66', 79'; Rico Simpson 76'; Con: Zarn Sullivan (4/5) 37', 56', 67', 80+1'; Pen: Zarn Sullivan (1/1) 5'	Report	Try: Karl Ruzich 29'; Sofai Maka 39'; Moses Leo 53'; Kade Banks 72'; Con: Tane Edmed (3/4) 31', 40', 54'; Pen: Tane Edmed (2/2) 14', 17'

Eden Park, Auckland
Referee: Fraser Hannon

7 September 2024
14:05 NZST

Wellington	36–12	Southland
Try: Kyle Preston 6'; Riley Higgins 17'; Leni Apisai 22'; Stanley Solomon 25'; Peter Umaga-Jensen 59'; Tjay Clarke 75'; Con: Jackson Garden-Bachop (3/6) 18', 27', 61'	Report	Try: Hayden Michaels 57'; Isaac Te Tamaki 64'; Con: Jake Strachan (1/2) 57'

Jerry Collins Stadium, Porirua
Referee: Nick Hogan

7 September 2024
16:35 NZST

Otago	16–34	Canterbury
Try: Jona Nareki 34'; Con: Cam Millar (1/1) 35'; Pen: Cam Millar (3/3) 3', 21', 29'; Cards: Henry Bell (yellow card) 77'	Report	Try: Jone Rova 8'; Dallas McLeod 61'; Finlay Brewis 63'; Brodie McAlister 78'; Con: James White (1/1) 8'; Shun Miyake (3/3) 62', 64', 79'; Pen: Isaac Hutchinson (1/1) 50'; Shun Miyake (1/1) 73'

Forsyth Barr Stadium, Dunedin
Referee: Paul Williams

7 September 2024
19:05 NZST

Hawke's Bay	24–25	Tasman – RS
Try: Sam Smith 34'; Joe Apikotoa 54'; Ben O'Donnell 63'; Mat Protheroe 76'; Con: Danny Toala (2/2) 65', 78'; Cards: Hugh Renton (yellow card) 22'	Report	Try: Ryan Coxon 10'; Quentin MacDonald 23'; Pen: William Havili (3/3) 3', 37', 61'; Campbell Parata (1/1) 80+2'; Drop: William Havili (1/1) 40+2'

McLean Park, Napier
Referee: Angus Mabey

8 September 2024
14:05 NZST

Taranaki	25–19	Waikato
Try: Vereniki Tikoisolomone 4'; Daniel Rona (2) 8', 15'; Josh Jacomb 79'; Con: Josh Jacomb (1/4) 80'; Pen: Josh Jacomb (1/3) 46'	Report	Try: Tepaea Cook-Savage 28'; Patrick McCurran 52'; Gideon Wrampling 60'; Con: Aaron Cruden (1/2) 29'; D'Angelo Leuila (1/1) 60'

Yarrow Stadium, New Plymouth
Referee: Stuart Curran

8 September 2024
16:35 NZST

Counties Manukau	25–14	Northland
Try: AJ Alatimu 2'; Tevita Ofa 21'; Etene Nanai-Seturo 31'; Jadin Kingi 72'; Con: Riley Hohepa (1/1) 72'; Pen: Riley Hohepa (1/1) 35'	Report	Try: Chris Apoua 57'; Matt Moulds 67'; Con: Rivez Reihana (2/2) 58', 68'

Navigation Homes Stadium, Pukekohe
Referee: Jonathan Bredin

11 September 2024
19:05 NZST

Otago	28–32	Wellington
Try: Lucas Casey 17'; Henry Bell 34'; Thomas Umaga-Jensen 59'; Hudson Creighton 72'; Con: Ajay Faleafaga (2/2) 19', 36'; Cam Millar (2/2) 60', 73'	Report	Try: Dominic Ropeti 21'; Nui Muriwai 44'; Akira Ieremia 53'; PJ Sheck 78'; Con: Callum Harkin (3/3) 22', 45', 54'; Pen: Callum Harkin (2/2) 6', 38'

Forsyth Barr Stadium, Dunedin
Referee: Marcus Playle

=== Week 6 ===
13 September 2024
19:05 NZST

Southland	29–41	Canterbury
Try: Michael Manson 10'; Viliami Fine (2) 24', 65'; Liam Howley 61'; Con: Byron Smith (3/4) 11', 25', 62'; Pen: Byron Smith (1/2) 17'; Cards: Mitchell Dunshea (yellow card) 40'	Report	Try: Nic Shearer (2) 2', 42'; Dallas McLeod 5'; Ngane Punivai (2) 40+2', 50'; Ryan Crotty 73'; Con: Shun Miyake (4/6) 3', 6', 40+3', 43'; Pen: Shun Miyake (1/2) 14'

Rugby Park, Invercargill
Referee: James Doleman

14 September 2024
14:05 NZST

Bay of Plenty	33–20	Taranaki
Try: Joe Johnston 12'; Naitoa Ah Kuoi 22'; Kurt Eklund 49'; Fehi Fineanganofo (2) 57', 63'; Con: Kaleb Trask (4/5) 14', 23', 50', 58'	Report	Try: Daniel Rona 29'; Vereniki Tikoisolomone 67'; Kini Naholo 80+5'; Con: Josh Jacomb (1/1) 30'; Pen: Josh Jacomb (1/2) 18'

Tauranga Domain, Tauranga
Referee: Jonathan Bredin

14 September 2024
16:35 NZST

North Harbour	58–19	Manawatu
Try: Tane Edmed (2) 11', 52'; Bryn Gordon 14'; Kade Banks (2) 26', 39'; Sofai Maka (2) 33', 73'; Con: Tane Edmed (7/7) 12', 15', 27', 34', 40+1', 53', 75'; Pen: Tane Edmed (3/3) 7', 24', 46'	Report	Try: Raymond Tuputupu 19'; Joseph Gavigan 21'; TK Howden 31'; Con: Liam O'Connor (2/3) 22', 32'; Cards: Pena Va'a (yellow card) 73'

North Harbour Stadium, Albany
Referee: Mike Winter

14 September 2024
19:05 NZST

Waikato	50–5	Hawke's Bay
Try: Tepaea Cook-Savage 7'; D'Angelo Leuila (4) 10', 13', 37', 45'; Malachi Wrampling-Alec 31'; Gideon Wrampling 59'; Con: D'Angelo Leuila (6/7) 8', 11', 14', 38', 46', 60'; Pen: D'Angelo Leuila (1/1) 24'	Report	Try: Danny Toala 20'

FMG Stadium Waikato, Hamilton
Referee: Fraser Hannon

15 September 2024
14:05 NZST

Counties Manukau	45–17	Otago
Try: Cam Church 12'; Peniasi Malimali (3) 14', 23', 55'; Riley Hohepa 39'; Blake Makiri 74'; Adam Brash 79'; Con: AJ Alatimu (5/5) 13', 15', 24', 40', 56'	Report	Try: Will Stodart 35'; Finn Hurley 47'; Con: Cam Millar (2/2) 36', 48'; Pen: Cam Millar (1/1) 10'

Navigation Homes Stadium, Pukekohe
Referee: Angus Mabey

15 September 2024
14:05 NZST

RS – Tasman	28–15	Wellington
Try: Timoci Tavatavanawai 12'; Finlay Christie 59'; Kyren Taumoefolau 72'; Nic Sauira 79'; Con: Campbell Parata (1/3) 73'; Pen: Campbell Parata (2/3) 33', 48'	Report	Try: Tjay Clarke 51'; Riley Higgins 63'; Con: Jackson Garden-Bachop (1/2) 52'; Pen: Jackson Garden-Bachop (1/1) 38'

Lansdowne Park, Blenheim
Referee: Daniel Waenga

15 September 2024
16:35 NZST

Northland	17–24	Auckland
Try: Heremaia Murray 35'; Quinton Nichols 60'; Rob Rush 67'; Con: Rivez Reihana (1/3) 60'; Cards: Rob Rush (yellow card) 18'; Tevita Latu (yellow card) 45'	Report	Try: Kemara Hauiti-Parapara 19'; Xavi Taele 25'; Patrick Tuipulotu 51'; Bryce Heem 54'; Con: Harry Plummer (2/4) 20', 53'; Cards: Angus Taʻavao (yellow card) 31'

Semenoff Stadium, Whangārei
Referee: Ben O'Keeffe

18 September 2024
19:05 NZST

Manawatu	26–21	Southland
Try: Jordi Viljoen 55'; Malakai Hala-Ngatai 62'; Pena Va'a 66'; Kyle Brown 80+1'; Con: Reece MacDonald (3/4) 56', 63', 67'	Report	Try: Viliami Fine 18'; Michael Manson 47'; Nic Souchon 75'; Con: Byron Smith (3/3) 19', 47', 76'; Cards: Viliami Fine (red card) 59'

Central Energy Trust Arena, Palmerston North
Referee: Maggie Cogger-Orr

=== Week 7 ===
20 September 2024
19:05 NZST

Hawke's Bay	19–63	Taranaki
Try: Tom Parsons 17'; Sam Smith 24'; Lolani Faleiva 79'; Con: Lincoln McClutchie (2/3) 18', 79'; Cards: Kianu Kereru-Symes (yellow card) 64'	Report	Try: Bradley Slater (2) 7', 32'; Vereniki Tikoisolomone (2) 13', 56'; Kini Naholo (3) 28', 47', 54'; Ricky Riccitelli 68'; Adam Lennox 73'; Con: Josh Jacomb (6/6) 8', 14', 33', 48', 55', 57'; Jayson Potroz (1/1) 29'; Ethan Reti (2/2) 69', 74'

McLean Park, Napier
Referee: Marcus Playle

21 September 2024
13:05 NZST

Northland	47–24	North Harbour
Try: Sam Nock 13'; Rivez Reihana (2) 20', 54'; Simon Parker 43'; Corey Evans 46'; Jordan Trainor 74'; Tevita Latu 78'; Con: Rivez Reihana (5/5) 14', 21', 44', 48', 56'; Lisati Milo-Harris (1/2) 75'	Report	Try: Sofai Maka 8'; Shilo Klein 36'; Shaun Stevenson 62'; Moses Leo 80'; Con: Tane Edmed (2/4) 37', 63'

Semenoff Stadium, Whangārei
Referee: Todd Petrie

21 September 2024
14:05 NZST

Canterbury	36–28	Counties Manukau
Try: Jone Rova 11'; Dallas McLeod (2) 19', 35'; Chay Fihaki (2) 27', 38'; Tom Christie 31'; Con: James White (3/6) 12', 28', 35'	Report	Try: Ioane Moananu 49'; Gibson Popoali'i 62'; Simon-Peter Toleafoa 67'; Hoskins Sotutu 80'; Con: AJ Alatimu (1/1) 50'; Riley Hohepa (3/3) 63', 68', 80'; Cards: Zuriel Togiatama (yellow card) 44'

Apollo Projects Stadium, Christchurch
Referee: Fraser Hannon

21 September 2024
15:35 NZST

Wellington	30–25 (a.e.t.)	Bay of Plenty
Try: Riley Higgins 10'; Leni Apisai 25'; Julian Savea 46'; Kyle Preston 82'; Con: Jackson Garden-Bachop (2/3) 12', 47'; Pen: Jackson Garden-Bachop (2/2) 56', 66'	Report	Try: Kurt Eklund 16'; Nikora Broughton 52'; Taine Kolose 74'; Con: Lucas Cashmore (2/3) 53', 75'; Pen: Lucas Cashmore (2/3) 21', 80+1'

Sky Stadium, Wellington
Referee: Angus Mabey

22 September 2024
13:05 NZST

Waikato	25–27	Tasman
Try: Quinn Tupaea 1'; D'Angelo Leuila 15'; Laghlan McWhannell 55'; Con: D'Angelo Leuila (1/2) 2'; Aaron Cruden (1/1) 56'; Pen: D'Angelo Leuila (1/1) 46'; Aaron Cruden (1/1) 76'; Cards: Gideon Wrampling (yellow card) 37'	Report	Try: Ryan Coxon 31'; Sam Moli 64'; Tim Sail 73'; Con: William Havili (3/3) 32', 65', 74'; Pen: William Havili (2/2) 40', 80+3'

FMG Stadium Waikato, Hamilton
Referee: Stuart Curran

22 September 2024
14:05 NZST

Auckland	27–19	Southland
Try: Rico Simpson 12'; Tuaina Taii Tualima 31'; Josh Beehre 36'; AJ Lam 40+1'; Con: Zarn Sullivan (2/4) 13', 37'; Pen: Zarn Sullivan (1/1) 74'	Report	Try: Leroy Ferguson 24'; Michael Manson 50'; Charlie Powell 66'; Con: Jason Robertson (2/2) 25', 51'

Eden Park, Auckland
Referee: Jonathan Bredin

22 September 2024
14:05 NZST

Manawatu	10–28	Otago
Try: Luke Campbell 73'; Con: Brett Cameron (1/1) 73'; Pen: Reece MacDonald (1/1) 20'	Report	Try: Liam Coltman 3'; Henry Bell 65'; Hudson Creighton 80'; Con: Cam Millar (2/3) 4', 66'; Pen: Cam Millar (3/3) 27', 40+2', 56'

Central Energy Trust Arena, Palmerston North
Referee: Daniel Waenga

25 September 2024
19:05 NZST

Taranaki	31–25	North Harbour
Try: Ricky Riccitelli (4) 13', 19', 43', 69'; Logan Crowley 38'; Con: Josh Jacomb (3/5) 15', 20', 39'; Cards: Michael Loft (yellow card) 6'	Report	Try: Tima Fainga'anuku 7'; Moses Leo 22'; Tane Edmed 73'; Con: Tane Edmed (2/3) 22', 74'; Pen: Tane Edmed (2/2) 28', 36'; Cards: Ben Ruzich (yellow card) 37'; Shilo Klein (yellow card) 69'

Yarrow Stadium, New Plymouth
Referee: Damian Schneider (Argentina)

=== Week 8 ===
27 September 2024
19:05 NZST

Counties Manukau	51–12	Wellington
Try: Kauvaka Kaivelata 27'; AJ Alatimu 36'; Ian West-Stevens 40+1'; Simon-Peter Toleafoa 51'; Cam Church 58'; Adam Brash 62'; Con: AJ Alatimu (6/6) 28', 37', 40+2', 52', 59', 63'; Pen: AJ Alatimu (3/3) 13', 43', 80+2'	Report	Try: Peter Umaga-Jensen 74'; Jeremiah Avei-Collins 77'; Con: Callum Harkin (1/2) 75'

Navigation Homes Stadium, Pukekohe
Referee: Mike Winter

28 September 2024
14:05 NZST

Bay of Plenty	53–13	Northland
Try: Kurt Eklund 13'; Filipe Vakasiuola 18'; Lucas Cashmore 27'; Naitoa Ah Kuoi (2) 40+1', 52'; Leroy Carter 44'; Fehi Fineanganofo 55'; Cole Forbes 62'; Con: Lucas Cashmore (5/8) 18', 28', 46', 53', 64'; Pen: Lucas Cashmore (1/1) 10'	Report	Try: Rob Cobb 72'; Jordan Trainor 78'; Pen: Rivez Reihana (1/1) 4'

Tauranga Domain, Tauranga
Referee: Marcus Playle

28 September 2024
14:05 NZST

Hawke's Bay	36–35	Auckland
Try: Kienan Higgins 14'; Kianu Kereru-Symes 23'; Freedom Vaha'akolo 48'; Tyrone Thompson 65'; Sam Wye 79'; Ben O'Donnell 80+2'; Con: Harry Godfrey (3/6) 65', 78', 80+4'	Report	Try: Xavi Taele 5'; Kemara Hauiti-Parapara 8'; Mills Sanerivi 56'; Vaiolini Ekuasi 69'; Con: Zarn Sullivan (3/4) 9', 57', 70'; Pen: Zarn Sullivan (3/3) 19', 27', 68'; Cards: Sika Pole (yellow card) 43'; Zarn Sullivan (yellow card) 43'

McLean Park, Napier
Referee: Stuart Curran

28 September 2024
16:35 NZST

Otago	47–31	Tasman
Try: Finn Hurley 9'; Christian Lio-Willie 27'; Hudson Creighton 42'; Nathan Hastie 63'; Will Stodart 71'; Penalty try 77'; Fabian Holland 80'; Con: Cam Millar (5/6) 10', 28', 43', 64', 80+1'	Report	Try: Jack Gray 15'; Nic Sauira 22'; Louie Chapman 49'; Johnny Lee 54'; Maloni Kunawave 57'; Con: Cooper Grant (3/5) 50', 55', 58'; Cards: Sione Mafi (yellow card) 77'

Forsyth Barr Stadium, Dunedin
Referee: Todd Petrie

29 September 2024
14:05 NZDT

North Harbour	65–19	Canterbury
Try: Tane Edmed 2'; Fatongia Paea 14'; Moses Leo (3) 17', 36', 42'; Jed Melvin 49'; Tristyn Cook 56'; Shaun Stevenson 59'; Bryn Gordon 71'; Con: Tane Edmed (7/9) 3', 15', 18', 44', 58', 60', 72'; Pen: Tane Edmed (2/2) 40+1', 80'	Report	Try: Chay Fihaki 23'; Dallas McLeod (2) 30', 38'; Con: Shun Miyake (2/3) 24', 39'

North Harbour Stadium, Albany
Referee: Angus Gardner (Australia)

29 September 2024
14:05 NZDT

Southland	14–38	Waikato
Try: Rory van Vugt 31'; Jack Taylor 38'; Con: Jason Robertson (2/2) 32', 39'	Report	Try: Xavier Saifoloi 11'; Aaron Cruden 14'; Ollie Norris 45'; Quinn Tupaea 55'; D'Angelo Leuila 67'; Con: Aaron Cruden (3/3) 12', 15', 46'; D'Angelo Leuila (2/2) 56', 68'; Pen: D'Angelo Leuila (1/1) 53'

Rugby Park, Invercargill
Referee: Fraser Hannon

29 September 2024
16:35 NZDT

Taranaki	33–31	Manawatu
Try: Jayden Sa (2) 12', 48'; Kaylum Boshier 40+4'; Obey Samate 50'; Jacob Ratumaitavuki-Kneepkens 67'; Con: Josh Jacomb (4/5) 13', 40+5', 49', 51'	Report	Try: Reece MacDonald 5'; Ataata Moeakiola (2) 16', 60'; Elyjah Crosswell 62'; Sam Coles 72'; Con: Isaiah Armstrong-Ravula (3/5) 6', 61', 63'; Cards: George Blake (yellow card) 35'

Yarrow Stadium, New Plymouth
Referee: Paul Williams

2 October 2024
19:05 NZDT

RS – Tasman	31–17	Auckland
Try: Timoci Tavatavanawai 12'; Jack Gray 26'; Ryan Coxon 69'; Con: William Havili (2/3) 13', 70'; Pen: William Havili (4/4) 44', 51', 55', 59'	Report	Try: Zarn Sullivan 8'; Caleb Tangitau 80+1'; Con: Harry Plummer (2/2) 9', 80+2'; Pen: Harry Plummer (1/1) 31'; Cards: Zarn Sullivan (yellow card) 25'

Trafalgar Park, Nelson
Referee: Angus Gardner (Australia)

=== Week 9 ===
4 October 2024
19:05 NZDT

Northland	28–31	Otago
Try: Rob Rush 13'; Allan Craig 19'; Heremaia Murray 30'; Remsy Lemisio 75'; Con: Rivez Reihana (4/4) 14', 20', 31', 76'	Report	Try: Christian Lio-Willie 28'; Cam Millar 43'; Finn Hurley 57'; Fabian Holland 63'; Con: Cam Millar (4/4) 29', 43', 58', 64'; Pen: Cam Millar (1/1) 7'

Semenoff Stadium, Whangārei
Referee: Angus Mabey

5 October 2024
14:05 NZDT

Manawatu	26–45	Counties Manukau
Try: TK Howden (2) 4 ', 51'; Jordi Viljoen 22'; Taniela Filimone 77'; Con: Isaiah Armstrong-Ravula (2/3) 23', 52'; Rihari Jobe (1/1) 78'	Report	Try: Blake Makiri (3) 1', 65', 68'; Cam Roigard (2) 46', 60'; Dalton Papalii 56'; Ioane Moananu 79'; Con: AJ Alatimu (2/2) 3', 47'; Tevita Ofa (3/5) 57', 60', 70'; Cards: Josh Gray (yellow card) 3'

Massey University Sport and Events Centre, Palmerston North (Note: The week 9 match between Manawatu and Counties Manukau on 5 October 2024 was originally scheduled to be played at Central Energy Trust Arena, but was later moved to the Massey University Sport and Events Centre with free entry to give a wider range of fans the opportunity to see the Manawatu Turbos live.)
Referee: Paul Williams

5 October 2024
16:35 NZDT

Southland	59–35	North Harbour
Try: Semisi Tupou Ta'eiloa (2) 3', 40'; Lachie Albert 4'; Jack Taylor (3) 17', 19', 26'; Rory van Vugt 29'; Faletoi Peni 53'; Jake Strachan 58'; Con: Byron Smith (7/9) 4', 5', 20,' 27', 29', 40+1', 54'	Report	Try: Bryn Hall 38'; Mark Tele'a 46'; James Little 55'; Bryn Gordon 63'; Sam Slade 71'; Con: Tane Edmed (5/5) 38', 46', 56', 63', 72'

Rugby Park, Invercargill
Referee: Marcus Playle

5 October 2024
16:35 NZDT

Wellington	46–28	Hawke's Bay
Try: Tjay Clarke 23'; Kyle Preston 28'; Billy Proctor 33'; Losi Filipo 36'; Riley Higgins 50'; Siale Lauaki 62'; Julian Savea 72'; Con: Jackson Garden-Bachop (4/7) 34', 51', 63', 73'; Pen: Jackson Garden-Bachop (1/1) 80+1'; Cards: Kyle Preston (yellow card) 8'	Report	Try: Harry Godfrey (2) 3', 15'; Tyrone Thompson (2) 8', 67'; Con: Harry Godfrey (4/4) 4', 9', 16', 68'

Sky Stadium, Wellington
Referee: Todd Petrie

5 October 2024
19:05 NZDT

Canterbury	36–19	Waikato
Try: George Bell 6'; Corey Kellow 18'; Ngane Punivai 40'; Isaac Hutchinson (3) 47', 62', 77'; Con: Isaac Hutchinson (3/6) 19', 63', 78'; Cards: George Bell (yellow card) 24'	Report	Try: Oli Mathis (2) 28', 64'; Pita Anae Ah-Sue 73'; Con: Tepaea Cook-Savage (2/3) 30', 65'; Cards: Austin Anderson (yellow card) 37'

Apollo Projects Stadium, Christchurch
Referee: James Doleman

6 October 2024
14:05 NZDT

Tasman	29–42	Taranaki – RS
Try: Jack Gray 37'; Tim Sail 44'; Ryan Coxon 57'; David Havili 70'; Con: William Havili (3/4) 45', 58', 70'; Pen: William Havili (1/1) 11'	Report	Try: Daniel Rona (2) 6', 51'; Michael Loft 19'; Jacob Ratumaitavuki-Kneepkens 49'; Adam Lennox 72'; Con: Josh Jacomb (4/5) 7', 20', 50', 73'; Pen: Josh Jacomb (3/3) 15', 28', 40+1'

Trafalgar Park, Nelson
Referee: Fraser Hannon

6 October 2024
16:35 NZDT

Auckland	24–26	Bay of Plenty
Try: Josh Beehre 5'; AJ Lam 15'; Caleb Tangitau 50'; Che Clark 80'; Con: Harry Plummer (2/4) 6', 80+1'	Report	Try: Jacob Norris 7'; Emoni Narawa 31'; Nikora Broughton 35'; Leroy Carter 69'; Con: Lucas Cashmore (3/4) 33', 36', 70'

Auckland Grammar School, Auckland (Note: The week 9 match between Auckland and Bay of Plenty on 6 October 2024 was originally scheduled to be played at Eden Park, but was later moved to Auckland Grammar School as part of Auckland Rugby’s focus in 2024 on representing their clubs, communities and schools.)
Referee: Daniel Waenga

== Play-offs ==
Quarter-finals
1	Wellington	29
8	Counties Manukau	14
2	Taranaki	14
7	Waikato	15
3	Tasman	14
6	Canterbury	62
4	Bay of Plenty	19
5	Hawke's Bay	17

Semi-finals
Wellington	29
Waikato	24
Canterbury	20
Bay of Plenty	32

Final
Wellington	23
Bay of Plenty	20

=== Quarter-finals ===
11 October 2024
19:05 NZDT

Wellington	29–14	Counties Manukau
Try: Riley Higgins 7'; Du'Plessis Kirifi 22'; Billy Proctor 26'; TJ Perenara 51'; Kyle Preston 74'; Con: Jackson Garden-Bachop (2/4) 9', 28'	Report	Try: Adam Brash 34'; Cam Roigard 56'; Con: AJ Alatimu (1/1) 35'; Riley Hohepa (1/1) 57'; Cards: Zuriel Togiatama (yellow card) 21'

Sky Stadium, Wellington
Referee: Ben O'Keeffe

12 October 2024
14:05 NZDT

Bay of Plenty	19–17	Hawke's Bay
Try: Leroy Carter 8'; Penalty try 44'; Taine Kolose 80'; Con: Kaleb Trask (1/2) 10'	Report	Try: Harry Godfrey 17'; Tyrone Thompson 31'; Jacob Devery 69'; Con: Harry Godfrey (1/3) 18'; Cards: Joel Hintz (yellow card) 44'

Tauranga Domain, Tauranga
Referee: James Doleman

12 October 2024
19:05 NZDT

Taranaki	14–15	Waikato
Try: Adam Lennox 53'; Bradley Slater 60'; Con: Stephen Perofeta (1/1) 54'; Josh Jacomb (1/1) 60'	Report	Try: Ollie Norris 8'; Oli Mathis 16'; Con: Aaron Cruden (1/2) 9'; Drop: Tepaea Cook-Savage (1/1) 50'; Cards: Samipeni Finau (yellow card) 42'

Yarrow Stadium, New Plymouth
Referee: Marcus Playle

13 October 2024
14:05 NZDT

Tasman	14–62	Canterbury
Try: Levi Aumua 36'; David Havili 46'; Con: William Havili (2/2) 37', 47'	Report	Try: Corey Kellow 8'; Mitchell Drummond 14'; Braydon Ennor 22'; Ngane Punivai (2) 31', 44'; Tom Christie 40'; Chay Fihaki 53'; Brodie McAlister 66'; Billy Harmon 70'; Con: Isaac Hutchinson (7/9) 14', 23', 32', 40+1', 45', 68', 70'; Pen: Isaac Hutchinson (1/1) 80+1'

Lansdowne Park, Blenheim
Referee: Paul Williams

=== Semi-finals ===
19 October 2024
16:10 NZDT

Bay of Plenty	32–20	Canterbury
Try: Joe Johnston 26'; Willis Halaholo 43'; Leroy Carter 55'; Semisi Paea 71'; Con: Kaleb Trask (3/4) 44', 57', 72'; Pen: Kaleb Trask (2/5) 10', 60'	Report	Try: Brodie McAlister 32'; Jone Rova 79'; Con: Isaac Hutchinson (1/1) 34'; Chay Fihaki (1/1) 80'; Pen: Isaac Hutchinson (2/3) 3', 39'

Tauranga Domain, Tauranga
Referee: Ben O'Keeffe

19 October 2024
19:10 NZDT

Wellington	29–24	Waikato
Try: Kyle Preston (2) 18', 51'; Siale Lauaki 39'; Penieli Poasa 67'; Con: Callum Harkin (3/4) 19', 52', 68'; Pen: Callum Harkin (1/1) 8'; Cards: Riley Higgins (yellow card) 36'	Report	Try: Oli Mathis 22'; Penalty try 36'; Mason Tupaea 75'; Con: Aaron Cruden (2/2) 23', 76'; Pen: Aaron Cruden (1/1) 13'

Sky Stadium, Wellington
Referee: Angus Mabey

=== Final ===
26 October 2024
15:05 NZDT

Wellington	23–20 (a.e.t.)	Bay of Plenty
Try: Julian Savea (2) 4', 33'; Losi Filipo 73'; Con: Jackson Garden-Bachop (1/3) 6'; Pen: Jackson Garden-Bachop (1/2) 27'; Callum Harkin (1/1) 93'		Try: Aidan Ross 17'; Emoni Narawa 58'; Con: Kaleb Trask (2/2) 19', 60'; Pen: Kaleb Trask (2/2) 44', 54'

Sky Stadium, Wellington
Referee: Angus Mabey

Wellington	Bay of Plenty

FB	15	Tjay Clarke	(substituted off) 93'
RW	14	Julian Savea
OC	13	Peter Umaga-Jensen
IC	12	Riley Higgins
LW	11	Losi Filipo
FH	10	Jackson Garden-Bachop	(substituted off) 86'
SH	9	Kyle Preston	(substituted off) 60'
N8	8	Brad Shields
OF	7	Du'Plessis Kirifi (c)
BF	6	Caleb Delany
RL	5	Akira Ieremia	(substituted off) 78'
LL	4	Hugo Plummer	(substituted off) 60'
TP	3	Siale Lauaki	(substituted off) 86'
HK	2	Leni Apisai	(substituted off) 56'	(substituted on) 91'
LP	1	Xavier Numia	(substituted off) 86'
Replacements:
HK	16	Hika Elliot	(substituted on) 56'	(substituted off) 91'
PR	17	Yota Kamimori	(substituted on) 86'
PR	18	Bradley Crichton	(substituted on) 86'
LK	19	Filo Paulo	(substituted on) 60'
FL	20	Sione Halalilo	(substituted on) 78'
SH	21	Nui Muriwai	(substituted on) 60'
FH	22	Callum Harkin	(substituted on) 86'
WG	23	Stanley Solomon	(substituted on) 93'

FB	15	Cole Forbes	(substituted off) 54'
RW	14	Leroy Carter
OC	13	Emoni Narawa	(substituted off) 80+1'
IC	12	Willis Halaholo
LW	11	Reon Paul	(substituted off) 60'	(substituted on) 91'
FH	10	Kaleb Trask
SH	9	Te Toiroa Tahuriorangi	(substituted off) 91'
N8	8	Nikora Broughton
OF	7	Joe Johnston	(substituted off) 91'
BF	6	Jacob Norris	(substituted off) 56'	(substituted on) 91'
RL	5	Aisake Vakasiuola	(substituted off) 61'
LL	4	Naitoa Ah Kuoi
TP	3	Benet Kumeroa	(substituted off) 91'
HK	2	Kurt Eklund (c)	(substituted off) 75'
LP	1	Aidan Ross	(substituted off) 41'
Replacements:
HK	16	Taine Kolose	(substituted on) 75'
PR	17	Josh Bartlett	(substituted on) 41'
PR	18	Filipe Vakasiuola	(substituted on) 91'
LK	19	Kalin Felise	(substituted on) 61'
FL	20	Semisi Paea	(substituted on) 56'
FH	21	Lucas Cashmore	(substituted on) 54'
CE	22	Fehi Fineanganofo	(substituted on) 60'
WG	23	Cody Vai	(substituted on) 80+1'

== Statistics ==
=== Leading point scorers ===
No.	Player	Team	Points	Average	Details
1	Tane Edmed	North Harbour	137	13.70	4 T, 39 C, 13 P, 0 D
2	Josh Jacomb	Taranaki	106	9.64	3 T, 29 C, 11 P, 0 D
3	William Havili	Tasman	104	11.56	0 T, 25 C, 17 P, 1 D
4	Cam Millar	Otago	100	10.00	1 T, 25 C, 15 P, 0 D
5	Jackson Garden-Bachop	Wellington	77	7.00	1 T, 21 C, 10 P, 0 D
6	Rivez Reihana	Northland	74	8.22	2 T, 23 C, 6 P, 0 D
6	Kaleb Trask	Bay of Plenty	74	8.22	0 T, 28 C, 6 P, 0 D
8	AJ Alatimu	Counties Manukau	71	7.89	2 T, 20 C, 7 P, 0 D
9	D'Angelo Leuila	Waikato	61	7.63	6 T, 11 C, 3 P, 0 D
10	Isaac Hutchinson	Canterbury	58	6.44	4 T, 13 C, 4 P, 0 D

Source: The weekly reviews of the matches published on provincial.rugby (see "Report" in the individual match scoring stats).

=== Leading try scorers ===
No.	Player	Team	Tries	Average
1	Kade Banks	North Harbour	10	1.11
2	Joe Johnston	Bay of Plenty	8	0.67
2	Kyle Preston	Wellington	8	0.62
2	Ricky Riccitelli	Taranaki	8	0.73
5	Tjay Clarke	Wellington	7	0.58
5	Sofai Maka	North Harbour	7	1.00
5	Dallas McLeod	Canterbury	7	0.70
5	Kini Naholo	Taranaki	7	0.88
5	Ngane Punivai	Canterbury	7	0.64
10	9 players		6	

=== Points by game ===
Team	1		2		3		4		5		6		7		8		9		10		Total		Average	
Auckland	21	29	25	27	21	27	21	39	36	32	24	17	27	19	35	36	17	31	24	26	251	283	25.10	28.30
Bay of Plenty	36	21	44	31	24	20	26	31	15	34	68	14	33	20	25	30	53	13	26	24	350	238	35.00	23.80
Canterbury	34	21	7	22	27	21	21	27	21	46	34	16	41	29	36	28	19	65	36	19	276	294	27.60	29.40
Counties Manukau	15	31	31	44	20	26	3	48	36	33	25	14	45	17	28	36	51	12	45	26	299	287	29.90	28.70
Hawke's Bay	41	32	31	17	55	30	27	21	38	26	24	25	5	50	19	63	36	35	28	46	304	345	30.40	34.50
Manawatu	21	54	18	35	31	39	26	38	14	68	19	58	26	21	10	28	31	33	26	45	222	419	22.20	41.90
North Harbour	32	41	20	24	43	29	33	36	32	36	58	19	24	47	25	31	65	19	35	59	367	341	36.70	34.10
Northland	21	34	35	18	30	55	26	31	19	34	14	25	17	24	47	24	13	53	28	31	250	329	25.00	32.90
Otago	13	22	27	25	31	26	18	22	16	34	28	32	17	45	28	10	47	31	31	28	256	275	25.60	27.50
Southland	22	13	17	31	24	39	31	26	12	36	29	41	21	26	19	27	14	38	59	35	248	312	24.80	31.20
Taranaki	31	15	19	26	39	24	22	18	25	19	20	33	63	19	31	25	33	31	42	29	325	239	32.50	23.90
Tasman	54	21	22	7	48	3	34	15	25	24	28	15	27	25	31	47	31	17	29	42	329	216	32.90	21.60
Waikato	21	36	26	20	29	43	39	21	34	19	19	25	50	5	25	27	38	14	19	36	300	246	30.00	24.60
Wellington	29	21	26	19	39	31	46	21	36	12	32	28	15	28	30	25	12	51	46	28	311	264	31.10	26.40

Source: Bunnings NPC Fixtures and Results 2024

=== Tries by game ===
Team	1		2		3		4		5		6		7		8		9		10		Total		Average	
Auckland	3	4	3	3	3	2	3	5	5	4	4	3	4	3	4	6	2	3	4	4	35	37	3.50	3.70
Bay of Plenty	5	3	6	4	4	2	4	4	2	4	10	2	5	3	3	4	8	2	4	4	51	32	5.10	3.20
Canterbury	6	3	1	1	2	3	2	4	3	6	4	1	6	4	6	4	3	9	6	3	39	38	3.90	3.80
Counties Manukau	2	5	4	6	2	4	0	7	5	5	4	2	7	2	4	6	6	2	7	4	41	43	4.10	4.30
Hawke's Bay	6	5	4	2	9	3	4	2	6	4	4	2	1	7	3	9	6	4	4	7	47	45	4.70	4.50
Manawatu	3	8	2	4	5	5	4	6	2	10	3	7	4	3	1	3	5	5	4	7	33	58	3.30	5.80
North Harbour	5	6	2	4	6	4	5	5	4	5	7	3	4	7	3	5	9	3	5	9	50	51	5.00	5.10
Northland	3	6	4	2	3	9	4	5	3	4	2	4	3	4	7	4	2	8	4	4	35	50	3.50	5.00
Otago	1	3	3	3	4	4	2	2	1	4	4	4	2	7	3	1	7	5	4	4	31	37	3.10	3.70
Southland	3	1	2	4	4	5	5	4	2	6	4	6	3	4	3	4	2	5	9	5	37	44	3.70	4.40
Taranaki	5	2	3	4	5	4	2	2	4	3	3	5	9	3	5	3	5	5	5	4	46	35	4.60	3.50
Tasman	8	3	1	1	7	0	4	2	2	4	4	2	3	3	5	7	3	2	4	5	41	29	4.10	2.90
Waikato	3	5	4	2	4	6	5	3	4	3	3	4	7	1	3	3	5	2	3	6	41	35	4.10	3.50
Wellington	4	3	4	3	5	5	6	3	6	2	4	4	2	4	4	3	2	6	7	4	44	37	4.40	3.70

For	Against

Source: The weekly reviews of the matches published on provincial.rugby (see "Report" in the individual match scoring stats).

=== Discipline ===
Player	Team	Red	Yellow	Sent off match(es)
Viliami Fine	Southland	1	0	Week 6 (vs. Manawatu)
Zarn Sullivan	Auckland	0	2	Week 8 (vs. Hawke's Bay); Week 8 (vs. Tasman)
Zuriel Togiatama	Counties Manukau	0	2	Week 7 (vs. Canterbury); Quarter-final (vs. Wellington)
Austin Anderson	Waikato	0	1	Week 9 (vs. Canterbury)
George Bell	Canterbury	0	1	Week 9 (vs. Waikato)
Henry Bell	Otago	0	1	Week 5 (vs. Canterbury)
Michael Bent	Taranaki	0	1	Week 1 (vs. Counties Manukau)
George Blake	Manawatu	0	1	Week 8 (vs. Taranaki)
Cam Church	Counties Manukau	0	1	Week 1 (vs. Bay of Plenty)
Liam Daniela	Counties Manukau	0	1	Week 1 (vs. Taranaki)
Mitchell Dunshea	Southland	0	1	Week 6 (vs. Canterbury)
Tane Edmed	North Harbour	0	1	Week 3 (vs. Waikato)
Samipeni Finau	Waikato	0	1	Quarter-final (vs. Taranaki)
William Furniss	Counties Manukau	0	1	Week 2 (vs. Waikato)
Josh Gray	Counties Manukau	0	1	Week 9 (vs. Manawatu)
William Havili	Tasman	0	1	Week 4 (vs. Bay of Plenty)
Willi Heinz	Canterbury	0	1	Week 2 (vs. Tasman)
Riley Higgins	Wellington	0	1	Semi-final (vs. Waikato)
Joel Hintz	Hawke's Bay	0	1	Quarter-final (vs. Bay of Plenty)
Taha Kemara	Waikato	0	1	Week 2 (vs. Counties Manukau)
Kianu Kereru-Symes	Hawke's Bay	0	1	Week 7 (vs. Taranaki)
Du'Plessis Kirifi	Wellington	0	1	Week 3 (vs. Manawatu)
Shilo Klein	North Harbour	0	1	Week 7 (vs. Taranaki)
Tevita Latu	Northland	0	1	Week 6 (vs. Auckland)
Michael Loft	Taranaki	0	1	Week 7 (vs. North Harbour)
Sione Mafi	Tasman	0	1	Week 8 (vs. Otago)
Peniasi Malimali	Counties Manukau	0	1	Week 1 (vs. Bay of Plenty)
Jackson Morgan	Taranaki	0	1	Week 3 (vs. Southland)
Jona Nareki	Otago	0	1	Week 4 (vs. Taranaki)
Jacob Norris	Bay of Plenty	0	1	Week 3 (vs. Otago)
Sika Pole	Auckland	0	1	Week 8 (vs. Hawke's Bay)
Kyle Preston	Wellington	0	1	Week 9 (vs. Hawke's Bay)
Hugh Renton	Hawke's Bay	0	1	Week 5 (vs. Tasman)
Rob Rush	Northland	0	1	Week 6 (vs. Auckland)
Ben Ruzich	North Harbour	0	1	Week 7 (vs. Taranaki)
Angus Taʻavao	Auckland	0	1	Week 6 (vs. Northland)
James Thompson	Counties Manukau	0	1	Week 3 (vs. Tasman)
Zuriel Togiatama	Counties Manukau	0	1	Week 7 (vs. Canterbury)
Will Tucker	Otago	0	1	Week 4 (vs. Taranaki)
Pena Va'a	Manawatu	0	1	Week 6 (vs. North Harbour)
Gideon Wrampling	Waikato	0	1	Week 7 (vs. Tasman)

== Ranfurly Shield ==
=== Pre-season challenges ===
On 29 February 2024, the Hawke's Bay Rugby Union confirmed that 2023 Meads Cup winners South Canterbury and King Country were the Heartland Championship teams to challenge Hawke's Bay for the Ranfurly Shield in 2024. However, on 22 May 2024, it was announced that South Canterbury had withdrawn from its challenge for financial reasons and that Whanganui – the 2023 Heartland Championship runners-up – would take its place.

26 June 2024
15:00 NZST

Hawke's Bay	57–7	King Country
Try: Josh Kaifa 4'; Jonty Stewart 9'; Anzelo Tuitavuki 17'; Tim Farrell 35'; Semi Vodosese 41'; Josh Gimblett 45'; Sam Wye 57'; Hunter Morrison 65'; Kere Penitito 70'; Con: Jonty Stewart (3/4) 5', 9', 35'; Meni Manase (3/5) 42', 58', 66'	Report	Try: Kaleb Foote 51'; Con: Patrick Hedley (1/1) 52'

Hawke's Bay Regional Sports Park, Hastings
Referee: Michael Winter (New Zealand)

27 July 2024
15:00 NZST

Hawke's Bay	80–5	Whanganui
Try: Danny Toala (2) 3', 55'; Joel Hintz 10'; Freedom Vaha'akolo 17'; Ben O'Donnell 22'; Tim Farrell 26'; Mat Protheroe (2) 38', 40'; Kere Penitito (2) 65', 71'; Meni Manase 74'; Sam Wye 79'; Con: Harry Godfrey (10/12) 3', 18', 27', 39', 40+2', 55', 66', 72', 75', 80'	Report	Try: Kamipeli Latu 61'; Cards: Josefa Namosimalua (yellow card) 68'

McLean Park, Napier
Referee: Marcus Playle
