= Kemara Hauiti-Parapara =

New Zealand rugby union player

- Full name: Kemara Henare Hauiti-Parapara
- Born: 5 March 1997 (age 29) Wellington, New Zealand
- Height: 174 cm (5 ft 9 in)
- Weight: 82 kg (181 lb; 12 st 13 lb)
- School: Wellington College

Rugby union career
- Position: Half-back
- Current team: Auckland
Senior career
Years	Team	Apps	(Points)
2017	Hurricanes	1	(0)
2017–2020, 2023	Wellington	54	(40)
2021–2022	Oyonnax	13	(10)
2022	Otago	10	(5)
2023	Highlanders	3	(0)
2024–	Auckland	10	(20)
- Correct as of 23 November 2024
International career
Years	Team	Apps	(Points)
2017	New Zealand U20	8	(0)
- Correct as of 22 October 2022

Kemara Henare Hauiti-Parapara (born 5 March 1997) is a New Zealand rugby union player, who currently plays as a halfback for Auckland in the National Provincial Championship.

== Early career ==
Hauiti-Parapara was educated at Wellington College where he played rugby for the school's 1st XV team; during his last season as the team's captain.

== Senior career ==
Hauiti-Parapara played his one and only game for the Hurricanes on 27 June 2017. He came off the bench in the Hurricanes' mid-week game against the British & Irish Lions during their 2017 tour to New Zealand. Two months later, on 20 August 2017, he made his NPC debut for Wellington against Manawatu.

After 4 seasons and 43 games playing for Wellington, Hauiti-Parapara left for France where he had signed a short-term contract with Pro D2 club Oyonnax for the remainder of the 2022–23 season.

After his return to New Zealand, Hauiti-Parapara was named in the Otago squad for the 2022 Bunnings NPC season. He made his debut for the province on 6 August 2022 against Counties Manukau. The following year, he returned to Wellington. During that 2023 season, he played his 50th game for the province on 17 September against Bay of Plenty.

Despite not being named in the Highlanders squad for the 2023 Super Rugby Pacific season, Hauiti-Parapara got an opportunity to play for the franchise as a result of the unavailability of Aaron Smith (due to All Blacks rest protocols) and James Arscott (injury). He played for the Highlanders during preseason and in the first three games of the regular season.

After four seasons playing for Wellington, Hauiti-Parapara signed for Auckland for the 2024 Bunnings NPC season.

== International career ==
In 2015, Hauiti-Parapara was named in the New Zealand Schools team for a three-match international series in Australia.

Two years later, Hauiti-Parapara was selected in the New Zealand Under 20 team for the 2017 Oceania Rugby Under 20 Championship, which that year consisted of tests against Australia, Fiji and Samoa, and for the 2017 World Rugby Under 20 Championship in Georgia. New Zealand claimed its 6th World Rugby U20 Championship title that year.
