= Mark Royal (rugby union) =

New Zealand rugby union player

- Born: 16 March 1988 (age 38) New Zealand
- Height: 177 cm (5 ft 10 in)
- Weight: 112 kg (247 lb; 17 st 9 lb)

Rugby union career
- Position: Prop
Senior career
Years	Team	Apps	(Points)
2017	North Harbour	1	(0)
2018–	Counties Manukau	9	(0)
- Correct as of 25 August 2021

Mark Royal (born 16 March 1988) is a New Zealand rugby union player who plays for Counties Manukau in the National Provincial Championship. His playing position is prop.
