= Sione Mafi =

New Zealand rugby union player

- Born: 19 May 2005 (age 21) Wellington, New Zealand
- School: Upper Hutt College; Nelson College

Rugby union career
- Position: Prop
- Current team: Tasman
Senior career
Years	Team	Apps	(Points)
2024–	Tasman	13	(0)
- Correct as of 3 October 2026

Sione Mafi (born 19 May 2005) is a New Zealand rugby union player who plays for Tasman in the Bunnings NPC. His position is Prop.

== Career ==
Mafi was named in the Tasman development squad for the 2024 Bunnings NPC, he made his debut for the side in Round 3 against Counties Manukau, coming off the bench in a 3–48 win for the Mako.

Mafi was educated at Nelson College from 2022 to 2023.
