= Mat Protheroe =

Welsh rugby union player

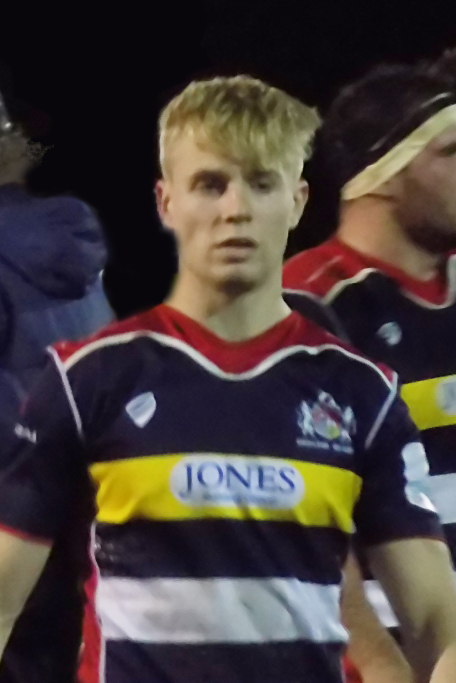
- Protheroe playing for Bristol
- Born: Mathew John Protheroe; 10 October 1996 (age 30) Swansea, Wales
- Height: 1.80 m (5 ft 11 in)
- Weight: 11 st 7 lb (73 kg)
- School: Hartpury College

Rugby union career
- Position(s): Fly-half, Fullback
Amateur team(s)
Years	Team	Apps	(Points)
2014–2015	Hartpury RFC		
2024–2025	Hartpury RFC	7	(15)
Senior career
Years	Team	Apps	(Points)
2015–2017	Gloucester	4	(0)
2017–2020, 2025	Bristol Bears	38	(64)
2020–2024	Ospreys	42	(37)
2024	Hawke's Bay	8	(25)
- Correct as of 27 December 2025
International career
Years	Team	Apps	(Points)
2015	England U18	1	(0)
2016-2017	England U20	5	(21)
- Correct as of 24 October 2021

Mathew John Protheroe (born 10 October 1996) is a Welsh rugby union player, who most recently played as a fullback for Bristol Bears in the Champ Rugby competition.

Born in Swansea, he was educated at Hartpury College in Gloucestershire, and was praised for his performances for Hartpury RFC in the 2014–15 season, scoring seven tries in 14 appearances in National League 1.

He made his Aviva Premiership A League debut for Gloucester against the Sale Jets in January 2015 at the age of 18.

On 27 May 2015, Protheroe signed his first professional contract with Gloucester Rugby, despite attraction from other top Premiership clubs. However, he left early by mutual agreement to join local rivals Bristol Rugby in the RFU Championship from the 2017–18 season.

On 22 February 2015, Protheroe was selected for England U18s, qualifying for England age group sides by virtue of playing for an English club, despite having no family or residential qualification for England. He produced a man-of-the-match performance in their 21–5 victory over France.

On 26 February 2020, the Ospreys announced the signing of Protheroe from Bristol for the 2020–21 season.

On 29 July 2024, Protheroe was named in the Hawke's Bay squad for the 2024 season of New Zealand's domestic National Provincial Championship competition. He played eight games for the province.

Protheroe then returned to England where he played for Hartpury RFC in the 2024–25 Premiership Rugby Cup and 2024–25 RFU Championship.

In October 2025, he signed a short-term deal with Bristol Bears for rounds 3 and 4 of the 2025–26 PREM Rugby Cup and a game against Argentina XV.
