= Ryan Coxon =

Professional New Zealand rugby union player

- Born: 30 September 1997 (age 29) Hamilton, New Zealand
- Height: 183 cm (6 ft 0 in)
- Weight: 118 kg (18 st 8 lb; 260 lb)
- School: St Peter's College Cambridge

Rugby union career
- Position: Prop
- Current team: Tasman
Senior career
Years	Team	Apps	(Points)
2017–	Tasman	73	(35)
- Correct as of 9 October 2026
Super Rugby
Years	Team	Apps	(Points)
2018	Crusaders	1	(0)
2019–2020	Chiefs	6	(0)
2024–2025	Western Force	19	(5)
- Correct as of 9 October 2026
International career
Years	Team	Apps	(Points)
2017	New Zealand U20	4	(10)
- Correct as of 9 October 2026

Ryan Cameron Coxon (born 30 September 1997) is a New Zealand rugby union player who plays for Tasman in the Bunnings NPC and most recently played for the Force in Super Rugby. His position is prop.

== Professional career ==
Coxon made his debut for Tasman in 2017. He played 1 game for the Crusaders in 2018 before he made his Super Rugby debut for the Chiefs against the Hurricanes during the 2019 Super Rugby season and played a total of 4 games for the Chiefs that season. He was named in the 2020 Chiefs squad but only played 2 games that year. Coxon was part of the Tasman side that won the Mitre 10 Cup for the second time in a row in 2020. Despite coming off probably his best provincial campaign yet he was not named in the Chiefs squad for the 2021 Super Rugby season. In Round 4 of the 2021 Bunnings NPC Coxon suffered a season ending injury while playing for Tasman against Waikato. The Mako went on to make the final before again losing to Waikato 23–20. In Round 7 of the 2024 Bunnings NPC Coxon played his 50th game for Tasman against Waikato at Waikato Stadium in a 25–27 win for the side.

== Western Force ==
In January 2024, the Western Force announced they had signed Ryan Coxon for an undisclosed length of time. He played in a majority of the Force's Super Rugby Pacific games until he suffered a head knock and was replaced for the rest of the season. In 2025 he scored a try in the Force's 34–10 loss to the Waratahs. After 2 years at the Western Force he was not resigned.
