= Matt Proctor =

NZ international rugby union player

- Full name: Matthew Phillip Proctor
- Born: 26 October 1992 (age 34) Wellington, New Zealand
- Height: 180 cm (5 ft 11 in)
- Weight: 90 kg (198 lb; 14 st 2 lb)
- School: St Patrick's College, Wellington
- Notable relative: Billy Proctor (brother)

Rugby union career
- Position(s): Centre, Wing, Fullback
- Current team: Force
Senior career
Years	Team	Apps	(Points)
2012–2018	Wellington	51	(63)
2013–2019	Hurricanes	67	(60)
2019–2023	Northampton Saints	72	(60)
2024	Rebels	5	(0)
2025	Force		
- Correct as of 2/11/2024
International career
Years	Team	Apps	(Points)
2012	New Zealand U20	3	(5)
2013–2018	Māori All Blacks	12	(5)
2018	New Zealand	1	(5)
- Correct as of 16 April 2019

Matthew Phillip Proctor (born 26 October 1992) is a New Zealand rugby union player who currently plays as a utility back for the Western Force in Super Rugby. He has previously played for the Northampton Saints in the Premiership Rugby and for the Melbourne Rebels and Hurricanes in Super Rugby.

== Club career ==
In October 2012, he was named in the Hurricanes squad for the 2013 Super Rugby season. He scored a try on debut against the Stormers on 27 April 2013, playing on the wing.

After the departure of the Hurricanes' long-serving midfield combination, Ma'a Nonu and Conrad Smith, Proctor became a regular starter for the club in 2016. At the end of the season, Proctor started for the Hurricanes in the 2016 Super Rugby Final, in which the team won Super Rugby for the first time. Proctor's form continued into the 2017 season, leading to rumours of an All Black call-up. However, Proctor lost his place in the starting lineup in 2017, after struggling with injury, while midfield team-mates, Vince Aso and Ngani Laumape, were the top two scorers of the competition for the year.

Although Proctor missed the Hurricanes' historic fixture against the touring British & Irish Lions, in 2017, he did start for the Māori All Blacks against the Lions, in a 10–32 loss, on 17 June 2017.

Having re-gained his place in the Hurricanes' starting XV in the 2018 Super Rugby season, Proctor was then named as Wellington's Captain for the 2018 Mitre 10 Cup, succeeding England international flanker, Brad Shields, as the team's leader.

On 11 January 2019, Proctor signed a three-year deal with English Premiership side Northampton Saints ahead of the 2019–20 season.

== International career ==
Proctor was a member of the New Zealand Under 20 team which competed in the 2012 IRB Junior World Championship in South Africa.

Proctor was named in the New Zealand's 51-man All Blacks squad for the 2018 end-of-year tour, by All Black Head Coach Steve Hansen, in the wider training squad to travel to Japan. In the absence of New Zealand's regular starting lineup, who travelled to Europe earlier than the rest of the team, Proctor was named to start in the 3 November test against Japan. Proctor was one of eight players to make their test debut for New Zealand in the game, including his Hurricanes team-mate Gareth Evans, as well as only two players to start on debut that day, the other being Blues loose forward, Dalton Papalii. Proctor had a fine performance and scored a try on his debut, with New Zealand beating Japan by 69–31.

== Personal life ==
Proctor is a New Zealander of Māori descent (Ngāi Te Rangi and Ngāpuhi descent). He is the brother of New Zealand international Billy Proctor.

== Super Rugby statistics ==
As of 29 June 2023

Season	Team	Games	Starts	Sub	Mins	Tries	Cons	Pens	Drops	Points	Yel	Red
2013	Hurricanes	4	3	1	263	1	0	0	0	5	0	0
2014	Hurricanes	9	3	6	363	1	0	0	0	5	1	0
2015	Hurricanes	11	4	7	416	3	0	0	0	15	0	0
2016	Hurricanes	13	12	1	899	1	0	0	0	5	0	0
2017	Hurricanes	7	6	1	452	2	0	0	0	10	0	0
2018	Hurricanes	9	9	0	655	3	0	0	0	10	0	0
2019	Hurricanes	14	13	1	967	1	0	0	0	5	0	0
Total		67	50	17	4,015	12	0	0	0	60	1	0
