= Bryn Gordon =

New Zealand rugby union player

- Born: 6 August 2001 (age 25) New Zealand
- Height: 179 cm (5 ft 10 in)
- Weight: 110 kg (243 lb; 17 st 5 lb)
- School: Palmerston North Boys' High School

Rugby union career
- Position: Hooker
- Current team: Blues, North Harbour
Senior career
Years	Team	Apps	(Points)
2023–	North Harbour	26	(15)
2025–	Blues	1	(0)
- Correct as of 22 March 2025

Bryn Gordon (born 6 August 2001) is a New Zealand rugby union player, who plays for Blues and North Harbour. His preferred position is hooker.

== Early career ==
Gordon attended Palmerston North Boys' High School where he played rugby originally as a flanker. He plays his club rugby for Northcote RFC.

== Professional career ==
Gordon has represented North Harbour in the National Provincial Championship since 2023, being named in their squad for the 2024 Bunnings NPC. He was called into the Blues squad as a late inclusion for Round 6 of the 2025 Super Rugby Pacific season, being named in the squad to face the Crusaders, making his debut in the same fixture.
