= Kade Banks =

New Zealand rugby union player

- Born: 9 June 2000 (age 26) New Zealand
- Height: 183 cm (6 ft 0 in)
- Weight: 90 kg (198 lb; 14 st 2 lb)
- School: Mahurangi College

Rugby union career
- Position(s): Wing, Fullback
- Current team: Blues, North Harbour
Senior career
Years	Team	Apps	(Points)
2020–	North Harbour	39	(85)
2024	Blues	1	(5)
2025	Hurricanes	2	(0)
- Correct as of 4 October 2025

Kade Banks (born 9 June 2000) is a New Zealand rugby union player, who currently plays as a wing or fullback for North Harbour in New Zealand's domestic National Provincial Championship competition and the Hurricanes in Super Rugby.

== Early career ==
Banks has been playing rugby from an early age, playing for Mahurangi. He attended Mahurangi College, co-captaining their side to a final's win in the North Harbour Championship. Before turning professional, Banks was a real estate agent.

== Senior career ==
Banks has represented North Harbour in the National Provincial Championship since 2020 when he was named in the province's NPC squad for the first time. Four years later, in 2024, he was the NPC top try scorer with 10 tries.

Banks was named in the Blues squad for the 2024 Super Rugby Pacific season.

On 16 October 2024, the Hurricanes announced that Banks had signed with the franchise for the 2025 Super Rugby Pacific season.
