= Tevita Ofa =

New Zealand rugby union player

- Born: 18 January 2002 (age 24) New Zealand
- Height: 186 cm (6 ft 1 in)
- Weight: 90 kg (198 lb; 14 st 2 lb)
- School: Wesley College, Auckland

Rugby union career
- Position: Centre / Wing / Fullback
- Current team: Counties Manukau
Senior career
Years	Team	Apps	(Points)
2022–	Counties Manukau	29	(63)
- Correct as of 20 January 2025

Tevita Ofa (born 18 January 2002) is a New Zealand rugby union player, who plays for Counties Manukau. His preferred position is centre, wing or fullback.

== Early career ==
Ofa attended Wesley College, Auckland and originally played youth rugby for the Chiefs academy sides, representing their Under-18s side. Ofa is of both Tongan and Samoan heritage and plays his club rugby for Manurewa in the Counties Manukau region.

== Professional career ==
Ofa has represented Counties Manukau in the National Provincial Championship since 2022, being named in their squad for the 2024 Bunnings NPC. He earned a training contract with the Chiefs for the 2024 Super Rugby Pacific season training with their side during the pre-season and representing the side in development matches, before signing with Moana Pasifika as an injury replacement for the 2025 Super Rugby Pacific season.
