= Joey Taumateine =

New Zealand rugby player

- Height: 187 cm (6 ft 2 in)
- School: Wesley College

Rugby union career
- Position: Wing
- Current team: Counties Manukau
National sevens team
Years	Team	Comps
2024-	New Zealand 7s	

Joey Taumateine is a New Zealand rugby union footballer who plays as a prop forward for Counties Manukau of the National Provincial Championship, and is a New Zealand Sevens international.

== Early life ==
He attended Wesley College, Auckland, and played for New Zealand Under-18s Sevens and New Zealand Men's Development side.

== Career ==
He plays club rugby union for National Provincial Championship side Counties Manukau.

In November 2024 he was called up to the New Zealand national rugby union sevens team for the Dubai Sevens and South Africa Sevens legs of the 2024–25 SVNS series. He had a try-scoring debut for New Zealand 7s against Spain 7s at the Dubai Sevens on 30 November 2024. He continued with the New Zealand Sevens in the 2025-26 SVNS series.

== Style of play ==
All Blacks Sevens coach Tomasi Cama described him as having "great speed and footwork for a prop which will be his point of difference".
