= Kyle Preston =

New Zealand rugby union player (born 1999)

- Full name: Kyle R. Preston
- Born: 13 September 1999 (age 27) New Zealand
- Height: 177 cm (5 ft 10 in)
- Weight: 79 kg (174 lb; 12 st 6 lb)
- School: Tawa College

Rugby union career
- Position: Halfback
- Current team: Crusaders, Wellington
Senior career
Years	Team	Apps	(Points)
2023–	Wellington	24	(50)
2025–	Crusaders	14	(30)
- Correct as of 22 Sept 2026
International career
Years	Team	Apps	(Points)
2025-	New Zealand	9	(0)

Kyle Preston (born 13 September 1999) is a New Zealand rugby union player, who currently plays as a halfback for the Crusaders in Super Rugby and for Wellington in New Zealand's National Provincial Championship.

== Early career ==
Preston attended Tawa College, where he played three years for the school's 1st XV rugby team. After leaving school, he first played for the Tawa Rugby Football Club in the Wellington premier club rugby competition, before joining the Old Boys University club in 2020. He represented Wellington at age grade level – from under 13 to under 19 – and was named in the Hurricanes under 18 side in 2017. Before turning professional, Preston worked as a roofer.

== Senior career ==
On 31 July 2023, Preston was named in the Wellington squad for the first time. He had made his debut for the province a few weeks earlier – on 12 July 2023 – in a Ranfurly Shield game against Horowhenua-Kapiti. His National Provincial Championship debut followed in round one of the 2023 Bunnings NPC against Manawatu. In his second year of playing NPC, he was part of the Wellington squad that won the 2024 Bunnings NPC title after defeating Bay of Plenty 23–20 in extra time in the final.

In November 2024 Preston was named in the Crusaders squad for the 2025 Super Rugby Pacific season, after having already trained with the squad earlier in the year as injury cover. On 14 February 2025 in the first game of the 2025 season Preston made his Super Rugby debut for the Crusaders against the Hurricanes and scored three tries.
