= Tjay Clarke =

New Zealand rugby union player

- Born: 20 August 2002 (age 24) Chatham Island, New Zealand
- Height: 181 cm (5 ft 11 in)
- Weight: 91 kg (201 lb; 14 st 5 lb)
- School: St Patrick's College, Silverstream
- Notable relative(s): Sam Clarke (brother); Chance Peni (cousin)

Rugby union career
- Position: Wing / Fullback
- Current team: Toshiba Brave Lupus
Senior career
Years	Team	Apps	(Points)
2023–2024	Wellington	17	(44)
2025	Hurricanes	1	(5)
2025–	Toshiba Brave Lupus	6	(30)
- Correct as of 31 May 2025

Tjay Clarke (born 20 August 2002) is a New Zealand rugby union player, who plays for the Hurricanes and Wellington. His preferred position is wing or fullback.

== Early career ==
Born on Chatham Island in New Zealand, Clarke spent his early childhood on the island before his family relocated to Australia, first to Perth before moving to Sydney. He attended Endeavour Sports High School in Australia before moving back to New Zealand attending St Patrick's College, Silverstream. He is the brother of rugby player Sam Clarke and cousin of fellow professional rugby union player Chance Peni, who also grew up on Chatham Island.

== Professional career ==
Clarke has represented Wellington in the National Provincial Championship since 2023, being named in their full squad for the 2024 Bunnings NPC. He was named in the Hurricanes squad for the 2025 Super Rugby Pacific season in November 2024.
