= Tristyn Cook =

New Zealand rugby union player

- Born: 18 December 2004 (age 21) New Zealand
- Height: 199 cm (6 ft 6 in)
- Weight: 110 kg (243 lb; 17 st 5 lb)
- School: Westlake Boys High School

Rugby union career
- Position(s): Lock, Flanker
- Current team: Blues, North Harbour
Senior career
Years	Team	Apps	(Points)
2024–	North Harbour	16	(5)
2025–	Blues	2	(0)
- Correct as of 4 October 2025
International career
Years	Team	Apps	(Points)
2024	New Zealand U20	1	(0)
- Correct as of 7 March 2025

Tristyn Cook (born 18 December 2004) is a New Zealand rugby union player, who plays for Blues and North Harbour. His preferred position is lock.

== Early career ==
Cook attended Westlake Boys High School where he captained their rugby side. He was a member of the Blues Under-18 side and came through the Auckland academy. In 2024 he captained the Blues U20 side in the U20 Super Rugby Pacific competition. He earned selection for New Zealand U20 in 2024.

== Professional career ==
Cook has represented North Harbour in the National Provincial Championship since 2024, being named in their squad for the 2024 Bunnings NPC. He was called into the Blues squad ahead of Round 4 of the 2025 Super Rugby Pacific season, being named in the squad to face the Brumbies.
