= Kalolo Toleafoa =

Samoa international rugby union player

- Born: 26 May 1971 (age 55) Apia, Samoa
- Height: 6 ft 1 in (1.85 m)
- Weight: 210 lb (95 kg)
- Notable relative(s): Konrad Toleafoa (son); Simon-Peter Toleafoa (nephew)

Rugby union career
Amateur team(s)
Years	Team	Apps	(Points)
–	Marist St. Joseph		
Senior career
Years	Team	Apps	(Points)
1997	College Rifles RFC		
Provincial / State sides
Years	Team	Apps	(Points)
1997	Thames Valley		
International career
Years	Team	Apps	(Points)
1998–1999	Samoa	3	(0)

Kalolo Toleafoa (born 26 May 1971 in Apia) is a Samoan rugby union player. He plays as a flanker.

== Career ==
He started his rugby career with the Marist St. Joseph. His first international match was against Tonga, at Sydney, on 18 September 1998. He was also part of the 1999 Rugby World Cup roster, playing only the match against Argentina, at Llanelli. He also was part of the 1997 Rugby World Cup Sevens roster.
