= Cam Christie (rugby union) =

New Zealand rugby union player

Cameron Christie
- Full name: Cameron Christie
- Born: 6 June 2004 (age 22)
- Height: 196 cm (6 ft 5 in)
- Weight: 114 kg (251 lb; 17 st 13 lb)
- School: Orewa College

Rugby union career
- Position(s): Lock, Loose Forward
- Current team: Blues, North Harbour
Senior career
Years	Team	Apps	(Points)
2023–	North Harbour	14	(5)
2025–	Blues	8	(0)
- Correct as of 4 October 2025
International career
Years	Team	Apps	(Points)
2023–2024	New Zealand U20	7	(0)
- Correct as of 9 December 2024

Cam Christie (born 6 June 2004) is a New Zealand rugby union player, who plays for the Blues and North Harbour. His preferred positions are loose forward and lock.

== Early career ==
Christie attended Orewa College, and represented New Zealand U20 in 2023 and 2024. He came through the Auckland academy and played his club rugby for North Shore, while also representing the Blues at U20 level.

== Professional career ==
Christie has represented North Harbour in the National Provincial Championship since 2023, being named in their full squad for the 2024 Bunnings NPC. He was named in the Blues squad for the 2025 Super Rugby Pacific season in November 2024.
