= Joel Hintz =

New Zealand rugby union player

- Born: 11 July 1996 (age 30) Masterton, New Zealand
- Height: 178 cm (5 ft 10 in)
- Weight: 106 kg (234 lb; 16 st 10 lb)
- School: St Patrick's College, Silverstream
- University: Lincoln University

Rugby union career
- Position: Prop
Senior career
Years	Team	Apps	(Points)
2017	Canterbury	2	(0)
2018	Wellington	11	(0)
2019–2024	Hawke's Bay	63	(5)
2023	New England Free Jacks	12	(0)
2023–2024	Sharks	2	(0)
2024	Western Force	1	(0)

Joel Hintz (born 11 July 1996) is a former New Zealand rugby union player. He spent most of his career as a prop for Hawke's Bay in New Zealand's National Provincial Championship. He also played for the Sharks in the United Rugby Championship in 2023 and 2024, and the Western Force in Super Rugby in 2024. He played for the New England Free Jacks in Major League Rugby (MLR) in the United States in 2023, winning the 2023 MLR Championship with them.

== Early life ==
Hintz was a champion powerlifter before committing fully to rugby, setting an under-18 world record in the squat in 2014.

Hintz graduated from Lincoln University with a Bachelor of Commerce (Agriculture) degree in 2018. He is of Māori descent, and affiliates to Ngāti Porou, Ngāti Kahungunu ki Wairarapa, and Ngāi Tahu.

== Playing career ==
Hintzs would sign with Canterbury in 2017 winning the Ranfurly Shield for the first time during his tenure with the team. He would then join Wellington in 2018 making 11 appearances.

In 2019 he would sign with Hawkes Bay during his tenure with the club Hintzs would win the Ranfurly Shield again in 2020, 2022 and 2023. As well as being a core piece to their Mitre 10 Cup Championship Division win in 2020.

Hintz would then sign with the New England free jacks for the 2023 season making 12 appearances and helping them win the 2023 MLR championship.

== Retirement ==
In 2025, Hintz announced his retirement from rugby, after being concussed on several occasions during his career. He said that we would taking up coaching, and concentrate on business interests.

He is also an avid hunter and fishermen.
