= Gus Farnan =

Australian rugby union player

- Full name: Angus Farnan
- Born: 16 November 2002 (age 23) Australia
- Height: 207 cm (6 ft 9 in)
- Weight: 119 kg (262 lb; 18 st 10 lb)
- School: St Kevin's College, Melbourne
- University: University of Melbourne

Rugby union career
- Position: Lock
- Current team: Force / North Harbour
Senior career
Years	Team	Apps	(Points)
2026–	North Harbour	7	(0)
2027–	Force	0	(0)
- Correct as of 1 November 2026

Gus Farnan (born 16 November 2002) is an Australian rugby union player, who plays for the Force. His preferred position is lock.

== Early career ==
Farnan is from Australia, growing up near Melbourne and attending St Kevin's College, Melbourne and University of Melbourne. He played club rugby for Melbourne Unicorns. He moved to New Zealand as part of his studies, playing club rugby for Marist Albion in the Canterbury region, being named Canterbury B player of the year in 2025. He moved to the North Harbour region for 2026, playing for East Coast Bays. In Western Australia, he represents the Associates club.

== Professional career ==
Farnan was named as a pre-season trial player for the Force ahead of the 2026 Super Rugby Pacific season. He returned to New Zealand for the 2026 Hilux NPC, joining North Harbour after some strong performances in club rugby. He was then named in the Force squad for the 2027 Super Rugby Pacific season, being named in the full train and trial squad.
