= Kurene Luamanuvae =

New Zealand rugby union player

- Born: 17 December 2004 (age 21) New Zealand
- Height: 188 cm (6 ft 2 in)
- Weight: 120 kg (265 lb; 18 st 13 lb)
- School: St Peter's College, Auckland

Rugby union career
- Position: Prop
- Current team: Chiefs / Counties Manukau
Senior career
| Years | Team | Apps | (Points) |
| 2026– | Counties Manukau | 14 | (0) |
| 2027– | Chiefs | 0 | (0) |
- Correct as of 10 November 2026
International career
| Years | Team | Apps | (Points) |
| 2024 | New Zealand U20 | 3 | (0) |
- Correct as of 10 November 2026

Kurene Luamanuvae (born 17 December 2004) is a New Zealand rugby union player, who plays for the Chiefs. His preferred position is prop.

== Early career ==
Luamanuvae was born in New Zealand and attended St Peter's College, Auckland, where he captained the rugby team. His school performances earned him selection for New Zealand Schools in 2022, and a place in the Blues academy, who he represented at U18 level in 2022, and U20 level in 2023. He played his club rugby in Auckland for Grammar Tec, before transferring to Ardmore Marist in the Counties Manukau region in 2026. In 2024, he was named in the New Zealand U20 side.

== Professional career ==
Luamanuvae has represented Counties Manukau in the National Provincial Championship since 2026, being named in their squad for the 2026 Hilux NPC competition. In October 2026, he was named in the Chiefs wider training group for the 2027 Super Rugby Pacific season.
