= Adam Lennox =

New Zealand rugby union player

- Full name: Adam Graham Lennox
- Born: 4 November 2002 (age 24) Whanganui, New Zealand
- Height: 1.78 m (5 ft 10 in)
- Weight: 82 kg (181 lb; 12 st 13 lb)
- School: Whanganui Collegiate School

Rugby union career
- Position(s): Halfback, Wing, Fullback
- Current team: Taranaki, Highlanders
Senior career
Years	Team	Apps	(Points)
2022–	Taranaki	40	(75)
2025–	Highlanders	7	(0)
- Correct as of 4 February 2026
International career
Years	Team	Apps	(Points)
2022	New Zealand U20	2	(5)
- Correct as of 4 February 2026

Adam Graham Lennox (born 4 November 2002) is a New Zealand professional rugby union player who plays as a halfback for Super Rugby club Highlanders.

== Early life ==
Lennox attended Whanganui Collegiate School where he played rugby and earned selection for the New Zealand Barbarians U18 side. He plays his club rugby for Stratford-Eltham.

== Club career ==
Lennox has represented Taranaki in the National Provincial Championship since 2022, being named in their squad for the 2024 Bunnings NPC. He spent the 2025 pre-season with the Highlanders being named in the squad for their pre-season fixture against Moana Pasifika. He was called into the full squad ahead of the Round 7 of the 2025 Super Rugby Pacific season, making his debut against the Brumbies.
