= Callum Harkin =

New Zealand rugby union player

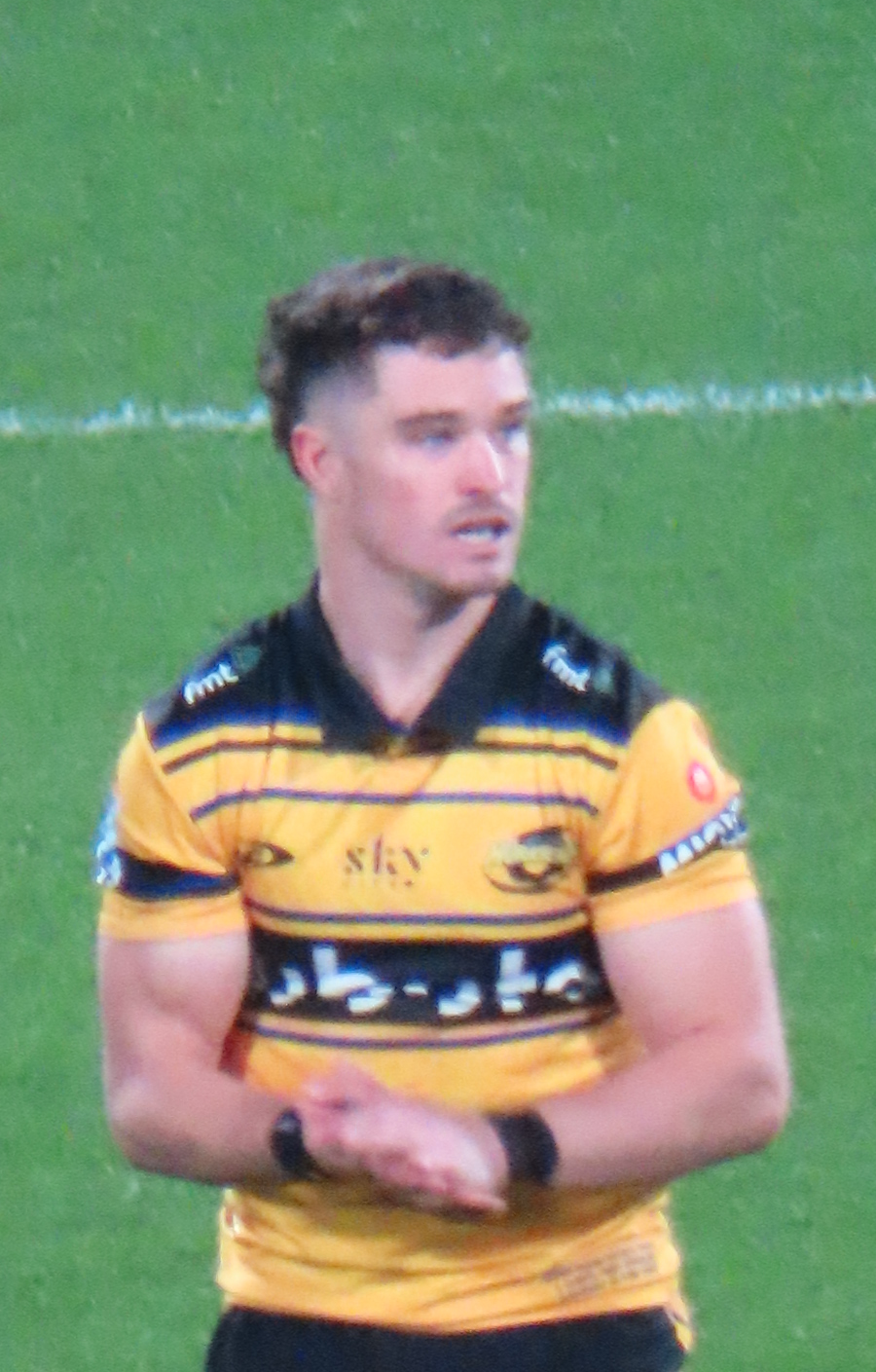
- Harkin playing for the Hurricanes in the 2026 Super Rugby Pacific final
- Born: 8 April 1999 (age 27) New Zealand
- Height: 184 cm (6 ft 0 in)
- Weight: 95 kg (209 lb; 14 st 13 lb)
- School: St Patrick's College, Silverstream

Rugby union career
- Position: First five-eighth / Fullback
- Current team: Hurricanes, Wellington
Senior career
Years	Team	Apps	(Points)
2024–	Wellington	20	(60)
2025–	Hurricanes	25	(50)
- Correct as of 16 February 2025

Callum Harkin (born 8 April 1999) is a New Zealand rugby union player, who plays for Hurricanes and Wellington. His preferred position is first five-eighth or fullback.

== Early career ==
Harkin attended St Patrick's College, Silverstream however he didn't achieve regular game time while at school, initially playing halfback. He spent a year in Ireland as a member of Ulster's academy playing for Malone RFC, before returning to the Wellington club rugby competitions, playing originally for Eastbourne before moving to Old Boy's University.

== Professional career ==
Harkin has represented Wellington in the National Provincial Championship since 2024, being named in their squad for the 2024 Bunnings NPC. He was in talks to join the Dallas Jackals ahead of the 2021 Major League Rugby season, however the team did not compete that season. He was called into the Hurricanes squad ahead of Round 1 of the 2025 Super Rugby Pacific season, making his debut in the same fixture.

In 2026, Harkin formed part of the Hurricanes squad which won the 2026 Super Rugby Pacific season. On 20 June, the Hurricanes defeated the Chiefs 60–5 in the final. Harkin scored one of the Hurricanes' nine tries.
