= Michael Loft =

New Zealand rugby union player

- Born: 11 November 1999 (age 27) New Zealand
- Height: 188 cm (6 ft 2 in)
- Weight: 101 kg (223 lb; 15 st 13 lb)
- School: New Plymouth Boys' High School

Rugby union career
- Position: Flanker
- Current team: Highlanders, Taranaki
Senior career
Years	Team	Apps	(Points)
2022–	Taranaki	25	(5)
2025–	Chiefs	1	(0)
- Correct as of 29 March 2025

Michael Loft (born 11 November 1999) is a New Zealand rugby union player, who plays for Highlanders and Taranaki. His preferred position is flanker.

== Early career ==
Loft attended New Plymouth Boys' High School where he captained the rugby team and earned selection for the Chiefs U18 side. He plays his club rugby for New Plymouth Old Boys.

== Professional career ==
Loft has represented Taranaki in the National Provincial Championship since 2022, being named in their squad for the 2024 Bunnings NPC. He was called into the Highlanders squad as a short-term replacement in January 2025. He was called into the full squad ahead of the Round 7 of the 2025 Super Rugby Pacific season, making his debut against the Brumbies.
