= Konrad Toleafoa =

New Zealand rugby union player

- Born: 29 October 2003 (age 23) Auckland, New Zealand
- Height: 190 cm (6 ft 3 in)
- Weight: 112 kg (247 lb; 17 st 9 lb)
- School: St Peter's College, Auckland
- Notable relative(s): Kalolo Toleafoa (father); Simon-Peter Toleafoa (cousin)

Rugby union career
- Position: Flanker / Number 8
- Current team: Otago
Senior career
Years	Team	Apps	(Points)
2025–	Otago	1	(0)
2026	Moana Pasifika	1	
- Correct as of 18 February 2026

Konrad Toleafoa (born 29 October 2003) is a New Zealand rugby union player, who played for Moana Pasifika in Super Rugby and Otago in the National Provincial Championship (NPC). His preferred position is flanker or number 8.

== Early career ==
Tolefoa was born in Auckland. He attended St Peter's College, Auckland where he played rugby and was head boy. After leaving school, he joined up with the Blues academy, representing them at U18 level in 2021, before joining up with the Highlanders academy, representing their U20s in 2022 and 2023.

== Professional career ==
Toleafoa has represented Otago in the National Provincial Championship since 2025, being named in the squad for the 2025 Bunnings NPC. In 2026, he was called into the Moana Pasifika squad ahead of Round 2 of the 2026 Super Rugby Pacific season, being named as a replacement for the match against the Hurricanes.
