= Tevita Latu (rugby union) =

Tongan rugby union player

- Born: 15 December 1998 (age 27)
- Height: 183 cm (6 ft 0 in)
- Weight: 108 kg (238 lb; 17 st 0 lb)
- School: Pakuranga College

Rugby union career
- Position: Midfielder / Wing
- Current team: Canterbury, Kurita Water Gush
Senior career
Years	Team	Apps	(Points)
2020–2023	Southland	17	(25)
2024	Northland	8	(20)
2025–	Canterbury	3	(0)
2026	Moana Pasifika	12	(0)
2026–	Kurita Water Gush		
- Correct as of 9 November 2025

Tevita Latu (born 15 December 1998) is a Tongan rugby union player, who plays for Canterbury. His preferred position is midfield or wing. He is the younger brother of the Tongan performing artist Aisea Latu and the older brother of Tongan basketball player Talanoa Latu.

== Early career ==
Latu attended Pakūranga College where he played rugby and earned selection for the Blues U18 side and the Auckland U18. While at school he was also successful in basketball, earning selection on the New Zealand U23s National Championships roster in 2019.

== Professional career ==
Latu has represented Canterbury in the National Provincial Championship since 2025, being named in the squad for the 2025 Bunnings NPC. He had previously represented Southland in the competition between 2020 and 2023, winning rookie of the year in 2020, and Northland in 2024. He signed for Moana Pasifika ahead of the 2026 Super Rugby Pacific season.
