= Cam Church =

New Zealand rugby union player

- Full name: Cameron Church
- Born: 3 November 2001 (age 25) New Zealand
- Height: 184 cm (6 ft 0 in)
- Weight: 102 kg (225 lb; 16 st 1 lb)
- School: Saint Kentigern College

Rugby union career
- Position: Flanker
- Current team: Chiefs, Counties Manukau
Senior career
Years	Team	Apps	(Points)
2024–	Counties Manukau	22	(20)
2026–	Chiefs		
- Correct as of 12 November 2025

Cam Church (born 3 November 2001) is a New Zealand rugby union player, who plays for the Chiefs and Counties Manukau. His preferred position is flanker.

== Early career ==
Church attended Saint Kentigern College where he captained the first XV, and represented New Zealand Schools in 2019. After leaving school he joined up with the Blues academy, representing their U20 side in 2021, having previously represented their U18 side in 2018.

== Professional career ==
Church has represented Counties Manukau in the National Provincial Championship since 2024, being named in the squad for the 2025 Bunnings NPC. He was named in the Chiefs wider training group for the 2026 Super Rugby Pacific season.
