= Taine Kolose =

New Zealand rugby union player

- Born: 25 February 2003 (age 23) New Zealand
- Height: 187 cm (6 ft 2 in)
- Weight: 120 kg (265 lb; 18 st 13 lb)
- School: Saint Kentigern College

Rugby union career
- Position: Hooker
- Current team: Chiefs, Bay of Plenty
Senior career
Years	Team	Apps	(Points)
2023–	Bay of Plenty	26	(30)
2026–	Chiefs		
- Correct as of 9 November 2025

Taine Kolose (born 25 February 2003) is a New Zealand rugby union player, who plays for the Chiefs and Bay of Plenty. His preferred position is hooker.

== Early career ==
Kolose attended Saint Kentigern College where he played rugby for the first XV, originally as a number 8. He plays his club rugby for Rangiuru. Kolose represented the New Zealand U19 side in 2022, and was a member of the Chiefs wider training squad in 2025.

== Professional career ==
Kolose has represented Bay of Plenty in the National Provincial Championship since 2023, being named in the squad for the 2025 Bunnings NPC. He was named in the Chiefs squad for the 2026 Super Rugby Pacific season.
