= Caleb Delany =

New Zealand rugby union player

- Born: 4 February 2000 (age 26) Stoke, New Zealand
- Height: 198 cm (6 ft 6 in)
- Weight: 113 kg (249 lb; 17 st 11 lb)
- School: Waimea College

Rugby union career
- Position(s): Lock, Flanker
- Current team: Wellington, Hurricanes
Senior career
Years	Team	Apps	(Points)
2020–	Wellington	50	(10)
2022–	Hurricanes	41	(10)
- Correct as of 18 August 2025
International career
Years	Team	Apps	(Points)
2022	Māori All Blacks	3	(0)
- Correct as of 18 August 2025

Caleb Delany (born 4 February 2000) is a New Zealand rugby union player who plays for the Hurricanes in Super Rugby. His playing position is lock or flanker. He was named in the Hurricanes squad for the 2022 Super Rugby Pacific season. He was also a member of the Wellington 2021 Bunnings NPC squad.

== Personal life ==
Delany is a New Zealander of Māori descent (Ngāti Tūwharetoa descent).
