= Isaac Hutchinson (rugby union) =

New Zealand rugby union player

- Born: 2 March 2004 (age 22) New Zealand
- Height: 180 cm (5 ft 11 in)
- Weight: 93 kg (205 lb; 14 st 9 lb)
- School: St Bede's College, Christchurch

Rugby union career
- Position: Wing / Fullback
- Current team: Chiefs, Canterbury
Senior career
Years	Team	Apps	(Points)
2024–	Canterbury	15	(93)
2026–	Chiefs	6	(10)
- Correct as of 19 May 2026
International career
Years	Team	Apps	(Points)
2023–2024	New Zealand U20	6	(18)
- Correct as of 19 May 2026

Isaac Hutchinson (born 2 March 2004) is a New Zealand rugby union player, who plays for the Chiefs and Canterbury. His preferred position is wing or fullback.

He competed for New Zealand U18 Touch Blacks in the 2022 Youth Trans Tasman in Christchurch.

== Early career ==
Hutchinson attended St Bede's College, Christchurch where he played for the first XV. He earned selection for the New Zealand Schools side in 2021, and was called into a New Zealand development camp in 2023. He represented New Zealand U20 in both 2023 and 2024.

== Professional career ==
Hutchinson has represented Canterbury in the National Provincial Championship since 2024, being named in the squad for the 2025 Bunnings NPC. He was named in the Chiefs squad for the 2026 Super Rugby Pacific season.
