= Simon-Peter Toleafoa =

New Zealand rugby union player

- Full name: Simon-Peter Joachin Toleafoa
- Born: 26 October 1998 (age 28) Māngere, New Zealand
- Height: 183 cm (6 ft 0 in)
- Weight: 90 kg (198 lb; 14 st 2 lb)
- School: De La Salle College, Auckland
- Notable relative(s): Kalolo Toleafoa (uncle); Konrad Toleafoa (cousin)

Rugby union career
- Position: First five-eighth / Wing / Fullback
- Current team: Counties Manukau
Senior career
Years	Team	Apps	(Points)
2024–	Counties Manukau	21	(25)
2025	New England Free Jacks	13	(15)
2026	Moana Pasifika		
- Correct as of 18 February 2026
International career
Years	Team	Apps	(Points)
2018	Samoa U20		
- Correct as of 18 February 2026

Simon-Peter Toleafoa (born 26 October 1998) is a New Zealand rugby union player, who played for Moana Pasifika in Super Rugby and plays for Counties Manukau in the National Provincial Championship (NPC). His preferred position is first five-eighth, wing or fullback.

== Early career ==
Tolefoa was born in Māngere. He attended De La Salle College, Auckland where he played rugby. He originally played his club rugby in the Auckland region, playing for Auckland Marist. After this he moved to the Counties Manukau region, representing Ardmore Marist and Manukau Rovers at club level. He is of both Tongan and Samoan heritage. In 2018, he represented the Samoa U20 side, where he was the captain.

== Professional career ==
Toleafoa has represented Counties Manukau in the National Provincial Championship since 2024, being named in the squad for the 2025 Bunnings NPC. In 2025, he signed for the New England Free Jacks ahead of the 2025 Major League Rugby season, helping the side win the competition. In 2026, he was called into the Moana Pasifika squad ahead of Round 2 of the 2026 Super Rugby Pacific season, being named as a replacement for the match against the Hurricanes.
