= North Harbour (National Provincial Championship) =

- NHRU official emblem
- Union: North Harbour Rugby Union
- Founded: 1985; 41 years ago
- Location: Albany, Auckland, New Zealand
- Ground: North Harbour Stadium (Capacity: 25,000)
- CEO: Adrian Donald
- Coach: Jimmy Maher
- Captain: Jed Melvin
- Most appearances: Walter Little and Ron Williams (145)
- Top scorer: Warren Burton (1,052)
- Most tries: Richard Kapa (63)
- League: National Provincial Championship
- 2025: 14th
Team kit

Official website
- www.harbourrugby.co.nz

North Harbour are a New Zealand professional rugby union team based in Albany, New Zealand. Established in 1985, they play in the National Provincial Championship. They play their home games at North Harbour Stadium in Albany. The team is affiliated with the Blues Super Rugby franchise and represents the area north of Auckland. Their home playing colours are white black and cardinal.

== Current squad ==
The North Harbour squad for the 2026 Hilux NPC season is:

2026 North Harbour squad
**Props**: (New Zealand) Oscar Cowley-Andrea; (New Zealand) Bradley Fifita; (New Zealand) Toma Laumalili; (New Zealand) Brody Savage ^{ST} (Note: Savage wasn't named in the original North Harbour squad, but was announced as a late inclusion in the side for Round 8.); (New Zealand) Tony Tafa; (New Zealand) Riley Tofilau; (Tonga) Leka Tuʻungafasi; **Hookers**: (New Zealand) James Fairbairn; (New Zealand) Bryn Gordon; (New Zealand) Moses Hafoka; **Locks**: (New Zealand) Cam Christie; (Australia) Gus Farnan; (New Zealand) James Fiebig; (New Zealand) Zinzan Hansen ^{ST} (Note: Hansen wasn’t named in the original North Harbour squad, but was announced in the side for the Quarter-Final.); (New Zealand) Jack Lee; (Samoa) **Taeao Pomale-Time**; (Fiji) Lorima Tekuku ^{ST} (Note: Tekuku wasn’t named in the original North Harbour squad, but was announced in the side for Round 10.)	**Loose forwards**: (New Zealand) Tristyn Cook; (Samoa) **Malaesaili Elato**; (New Zealand) AJ Lemalu; (New Zealand) Jed Melvin **(c)**; (Fiji) **Motikai Murray**; (New Zealand) Victor Olaaiga ^{ST} (Note: Olaaiga wasn’t named in the original North Harbour squad, but was announced in the side for Round 5.); (New Zealand) George Reeves; (Australia) Dane Sawers; (New Zealand) **Wallace Sititi**; (Tonga) **Sam Tuitupou**; **Halfbacks (scrum-halves)**: (New Zealand) Bryn Hall; (New Zealand) Nui Muriwai; (New Zealand) Tamatea Winiana ^{ST} (Note: Winiana wasn’t named in the original North Harbour squad, but was announced in the side for Round 7.); (Fiji) **Sam Wye**; **First five-eighths (fly-halves)**: (New Zealand) Cameron Howell; (New Zealand) Oscar Koller; (New Zealand) Coby Miln	**Midfielders (centres)**: (New Zealand) Tom Barham; (New Zealand) Leo Gordon; (Fiji) Iosefo Namoce; (Tonga) Finau Paea ^{ST} (Note: Paea wasn't named in the original North Harbour squad, but was announced in the side for Round 3.); **Outside backs**: (New Zealand) Kade Banks; (Tonga) **Tima Faingaʻanuku**; (Australia) Israel Leota; (New Zealand) Sofai Notoa-Tipo; (Tonga) **Tyler Pulini**; (New Zealand) Hunter Rice; (New Zealand) Rory Taylor
**(c)** denotes the team captain. **Bold** denotes internationally capped players.^{ST} denotes a short-term signing. Source:

== Honours ==
North Harbour have never been overall Champions. Their full list of honours, though, include:

National Provincial Championship Third Division

- Winners: 1985

National Provincial Championship Second Division

- Winners: 1987

Mitre 10 Cup Championship Division

- Winners: 2016

== Current Super Rugby players ==
Players named in the 2025 North Harbour squad, who also earned contracts or were named in a squad for any side participating in the 2025 Super Rugby Pacific season.

Player	Team
Kade Banks	Hurricanes
Cam Christie	Blues
Tristyn Cook	Blues
Bryn Gordon	Blues
Felix Kalapu	Waratahs
James Lay	Moana Pasifika
Sione Mafileo	Moana Pasifika
Patrick Pellegrini	Moana Pasifika
Tom Savage	Moana Pasifika
Wallace Sititi	Chiefs
Cameron Suafoa	Blues
Mark Tele'a	Blues
