= Sam Wye =

Fiji international rugby union player

- Born: 11 November 2000 (age 26) New Zealand
- Height: 178 cm (5 ft 10 in)
- Weight: 89 kg (196 lb; 14 st 0 lb)
- School: St Peter's College

Rugby union career
- Position: Half-back
- Current team: Counties Manukau
Senior career
Years	Team	Apps	(Points)
2021–2022	Auckland	2	(0)
2023	Moana Pasifika	1	(0)
2023–2024	Hawke's Bay	12	(20)
2025	Counties Manukau	2	
- Correct as of 8 July 2026
International career
Years	Team	Apps	(Points)
2025	Fiji	6	
- Correct as of 8 July 2026

Sam Wye (born 11 November 2000) is a New Zealand rugby union player, who currently plays as a scrum-half for Hawke's Bay in New Zealand's domestic National Provincial Championship competition.

== Early career ==
Wye attended St Peter's College, Auckland and played for Ponsonby RFC. Wye is Fijian qualified. His father Philip Wye played football for Lautoka F.C. in the 90's, early 2000's.

== Professional career ==
Wye was named in the Auckland squad for the 2022 Bunnings NPC. He was called into the Moana Pasifika side ahead of Round 12 of the 2023 Super Rugby Pacific season, making his debut in the match against the Hurricanes. In 2023, he moved from Auckland to Hawke's Bay ahead of the 2023 Bunnings NPC. Sam Wye enjoyed some success with Hawkes Bay, finishing as Ranfurly Shield holders and runners up in the 2023 season.

After 2024, having made 12 appearances for Hawkes Bay, Sam made the move north signing with Counties Manukau for the 2025 season.

Game time for Counties however, would be limited after in July of 2025, Sam would receive an unexpected call up from Fiji's Head Coach Mick Byrne, naming him in the Flying Fijians for the 2025 season. Sam would make his international debut from the bench in Fiji's 29 - 14 victory over Scotland. 2025 would see him go on to make 6 appearances that year for Fiji, including 4 in the 2025 Pacific Nations Cup, where Fiji would win their 7th title.
