= Riley Higgins =

New Zealand rugby union player

- Born: 10 September 2002 (age 24) Palmerston North, New Zealand
- Height: 187 cm (6 ft 2 in)
- Weight: 99 kg (218 lb; 15 st 8 lb)
- School: St Patrick's College, Silverstream
- Notable relative: Kienan Higgins (brother)

Rugby union career
- Position: Centre
- Current team: Wellington, Hurricanes
Senior career
Years	Team	Apps	(Points)
2022–	Hurricanes	14	(5)
2022–	Wellington	19	(40)
- Correct as of 27 July 2024
International career
Years	Team	Apps	(Points)
2021	New Zealand U20	4	(0)
- Correct as of 27 July 2024

Riley Higgins is a New Zealand rugby union player who plays for the Hurricanes in Super Rugby. His playing position is centre. He was named in the Hurricanes squad for Round 12 of the 2022 Super Rugby Pacific season.
