= Oli Mathis =

New Zealand rugby player (born 2005)

Oliver Charles Mathis
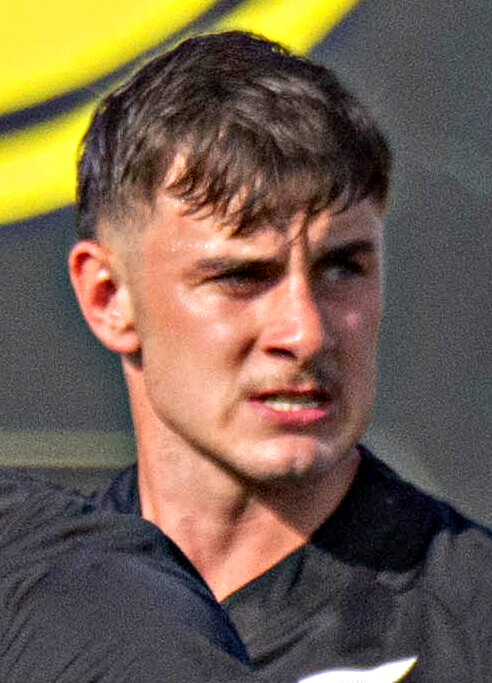
- Born: 12 September 2005 (age 21)
- Height: 186 cm (6 ft 1 in)
- Weight: 98 kg (216 lb; 15 st 6 lb)
- School: Hamilton Boys High School

Rugby union career
- Position(s): Flanker; Winger
- Current team: Crusaders
Senior career
Years	Team	Apps	(Points)
2024-	Waikato	17	(40)
2026	Crusaders		
National sevens team
Years	Team		Comps
2024-	New Zealand 7s		

Oliver Charles Mathis (born 12 September 2005) is a New Zealand professional rugby union player. He plays for Crusaders and previously featured for Waikato in the National Provincial Championship and the New Zealand national rugby union sevens team.

== Early life ==
He attended Hamilton Boys' High School and featured for the New Zealand national schoolboy rugby union team in 2023.

== Club career ==
He displayed versatility in his debut season playing for Waikato in the National Provincial Championship in 2024, making three starting appearances at flanker and two on the wing, and scored five tries in his five starts and seven total appearances. He scored a try in the semi final of the NPC in 2024 as his team bowed out to Wellington.

Ahead of the 2026 season, he signed for Super Rugby side Crusaders.

== International career ==
In November 2024 he was called up to the New Zealand national rugby union sevens team for the Dubai Sevens and South Africa Sevens legs of the 2024–25 SVNS series. He made his debut against the USA and scored his first international try in the Dubai Sevens against Spain.
