= Sofai Notoa-Tipo =

New Zealand rugby player (born 2001)

- Born: 2 May 2001 (age 25)
- Height: 1.81 m (5 ft 11 in)
- Weight: 95 kg (209 lb)
- School: De La Salle College

Rugby union career
- Position: Winger
- Current team: North Harbour
Senior career
Years	Team	Apps	(Points)
2022	Auckland	1	(0)
2023-	North Harbour	21	(65)
National sevens team
Years	Team		Comps
2024-	New Zealand 7s		

Sofai Notoa-Tipo (né Maka; born 2 May 2001) is a New Zealand rugby union footballer who plays for the New Zealand national rugby sevens team.

== Early life ==
He attended De La Salle College and played for Blues U20.

== Club career ==
He appeared in the National Provincial Championship playing for Auckland in 2022 prior to making the move to North Harbour. He scored seven tries for Northern Harbour side in the 2024 NPC.

== International career ==
In November 2024 he was called-up to the New Zealand national rugby union sevens team for the Dubai Sevens and South Africa Sevens legs of the 2024–25 SVNS series. He took the number 81 jersey in honour of his school address (De La Salle College 81 Gray Avenue, Auckland). He scored his first tries with a brace in a quarter finals win over South Africa at the Dubai Sevens. He was a try scorer in the third/fourth playoff at the SVNS World Championship in Los Angeles in May 2025, as Nee Zealand placed third overall.

== Style of play ==
All Blacks Sevens coach Tomasi Cama described him as having "the potential to become a great sevens player…he makes a lot of line breaks, scores a lot of tries; he understands the game well".
