= Peniasi Malimali =

Fijian rugby union player (born 1996)

- Born: 8 December 1996 (age 29) Vaturu, Nadi, Fiji
- Height: 182 cm (6 ft 0 in)
- Weight: 98 kg (216 lb)

Rugby union career
- Position: Wing
- Current team: Counties Manukau, Chiefs
Senior career
Years	Team	Apps	(Points)
2021–	Counties Manukau	28	(50)
2023–	Chiefs	5	(5)
- Correct as of 17 August 2025

Peniasi Malimali (born 8 December 1996) is a Fijian rugby union player who plays for the Chiefs in Super Rugby. His playing position is wing. He was named in the Chiefs squad for the 2023 Super Rugby Pacific season. He was also a member of the Counties Manukau 2022 Bunnings NPC squad.

Malimali made a number of standout performances during the 2022 Bunnings NPC, including scoring twice against Manawatu. He has been compared to Drua star Vinaya Habosi who had a breakout campaign during the 2022 Super Rugby Pacific season.
