= Josh Gray (rugby union, born 1999) =

New Zealand rugby union player

- Full name: Joshua Gray
- Born: 18 April 1999 (age 27) Auckland, New Zealand
- Height: 179 cm (5 ft 10 in)
- Weight: 92 kg (203 lb; 14 st 7 lb)
- School: Sacred Heart College, Auckland

Rugby union career
- Position: Wing
- Current team: Hurricanes, Counties Manukau
Senior career
Years	Team	Apps	(Points)
2019, 2023–	Counties Manukau	28	(45)
2026–	Hurricanes		
- Correct as of 19 November 2025

Josh Gray (born 18 April 1999) is a New Zealand rugby union player, who plays for the Hurricanes and Counties Manukau. His preferred position is wing.

== Early career ==
Gray was born in Auckland and attended Sacred Heart College, Auckland where he played rugby for the first XV. Having moved to the Counties Manukau region, he played club rugby first for Ardmore Marist, and later Patumahoe. Gray is of Samoan heritage, and was named in their sevens side in 2022, but didn't make an appearance. In 2023, he was named in the New Zealand Barbarians squad.

== Professional career ==
Gray has represented Counties Manukau in the National Provincial Championship since 2023 (having made two appearances previously in 2019), being named in the squad for the 2025 Bunnings NPC. He was named in the Hurricanes wider training group for the 2026 Super Rugby Pacific season.
