= Du'Plessis Kirifi =

New Zealand rugby union player

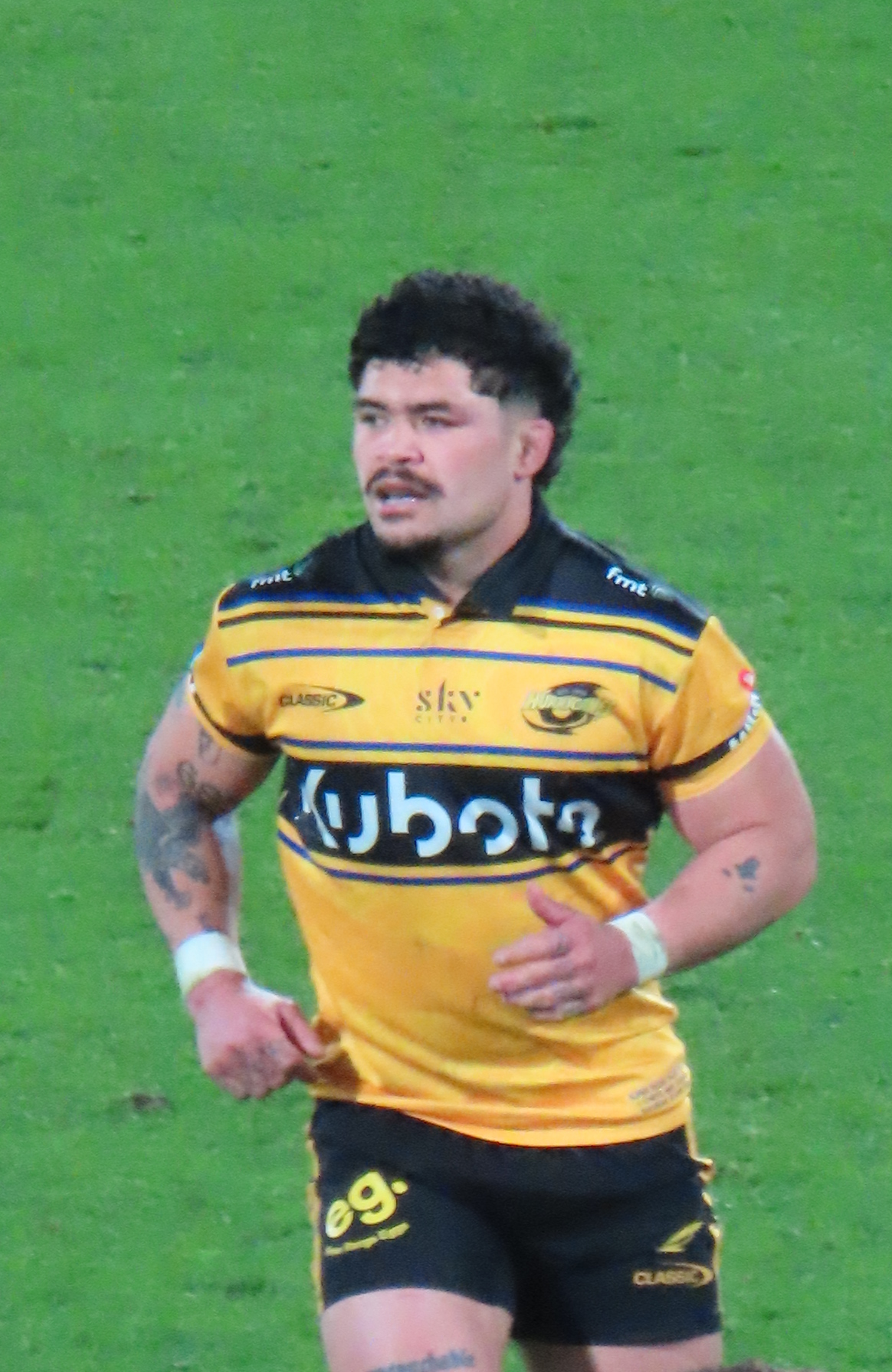
- Kirifi playing for the Hurricanes in the 2026 Super Rugby Pacific final
- Full name: Du'Plessis Ariu Kirifi
- Born: 3 March 1997 (age 29) New Plymouth, New Zealand
- Height: 181 cm (5 ft 11 in)
- Weight: 103 kg (227 lb; 16 st 3 lb)
- School: Francis Douglas Memorial College

Rugby union career
- Position: Flanker, Centre
- Current team: Wellington, Hurricanes
Senior career
Years	Team	Apps	(Points)
2017–	Wellington	78	(100)
2019–	Hurricanes	106	(80)
- Correct as of 17 October 2026
International career
Years	Team	Apps	(Points)
2023–2024	All Blacks XV	3	(0)
2025–	New Zealand	9	(5)
- Correct as of 17 October 2026

Du'Plessis Ariu Kirifi (born 3 March 1997) is a New Zealand rugby union player who plays for the Hurricanes in Super Rugby and Wellington in the Bunnings NPC. His position is flanker. He has played for the Hurricanes since 2019.

He attended Francis Douglas Memorial College in New Plymouth and is of Samoan descent.

He is named after Morné du Plessis, former captain of the Springboks.

== Club career ==
In 2026, Kirifi formed part of the Hurricanes squad which won the 2026 Super Rugby Pacific season. On 20 June, the Hurricanes defeated the Chiefs 60–5 in the final.
