= Losi Filipo =

New Zealand-Samoan rugby union player (born 1997)

- Full name: Losilosivale Filipo
- Born: 29 December 1997 (age 28)
- School: St Patrick's College, Silverstream

Rugby union career
- Position: Outside back
Provincial / State sides
Years	Team	Apps	(Points)
2017–	Wellington	22	(50)
International career
Years	Team	Apps	(Points)
2021–	Samoa	1	(0)

Losilosivale Filipo (born 29 December 1997) is a New Zealand rugby union player of Samoan descent.

== Early life and education ==
Filipo hails from Porirua and was a boarder at St Patrick's College, Silverstream. He represented New Zealand under-16s in rugby league and was a New Zealand Schools rugby union player.

When he was 17, Filipo got charged with assaulting four people, two of them female, during a fight in central Wellington. He was discharged without conviction by a district court judge who took into account Filipo's future rugby prospects had he been convicted, a decision that prompted public outcry. Police appealed the ruling to the High Court and Filipo was subsequently sentenced to nine months supervision.

== Sporting career ==
Filipo, an outside back, made his Wellington provincial debut in 2017. He is a former Samoa under-20s captain and in 2019 was named in a New Zealand Sevens development squad. In 2021, Filipo debuted for Samoa in a win over Tonga at Waikato Stadium, which secured the country's qualification for the 2023 World Cup.

== See also ==
- List of Samoa national rugby union players
