= Billy Proctor =

New Zealand rugby union player

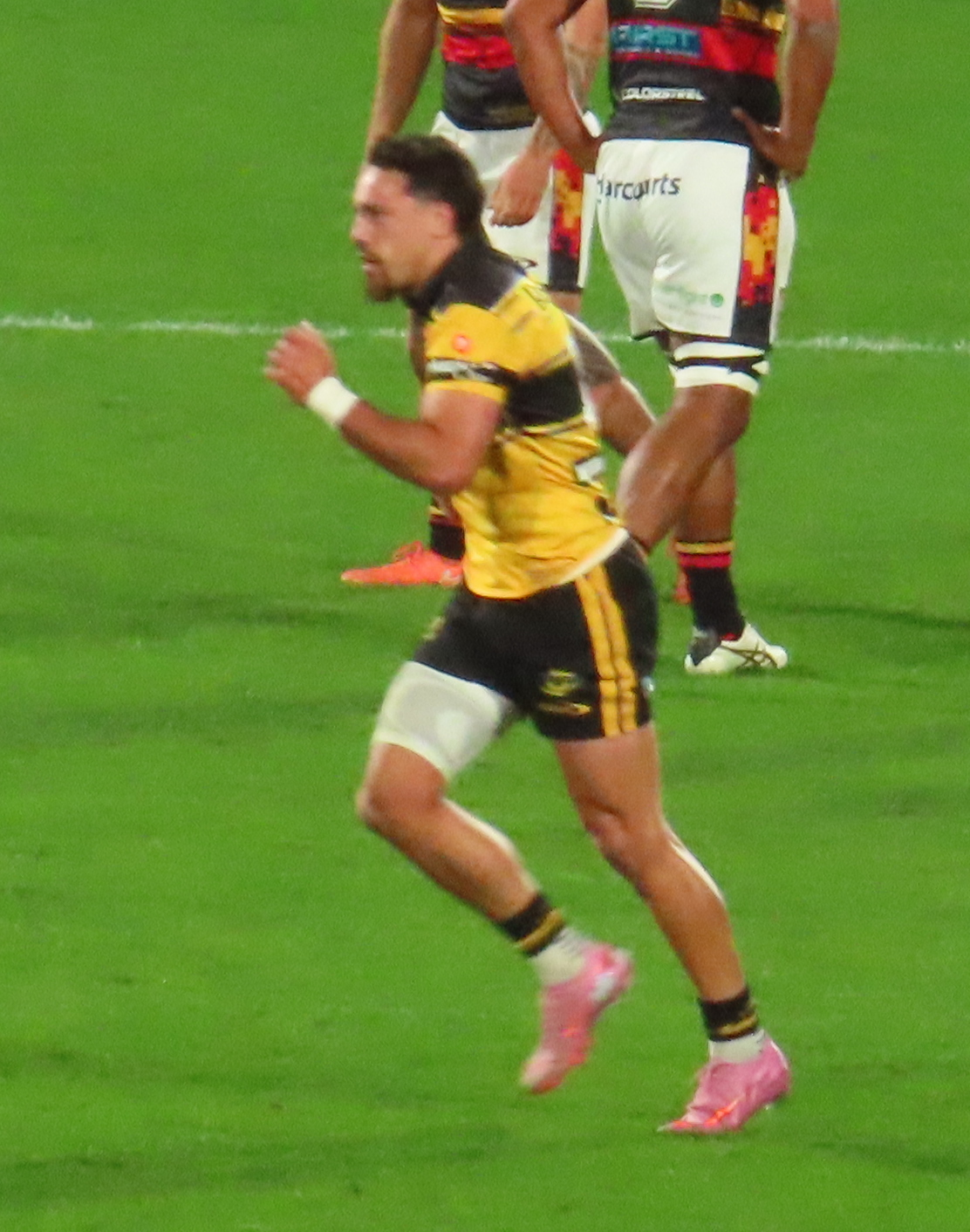
- Proctor playing for the Hurricanes in the 2026 Super Rugby Pacific final
- Born: 14 May 1999 (age 27) Wellington, New Zealand
- Height: 1.87 m (6 ft 2 in)
- Weight: 96 kg (212 lb; 15 st 2 lb)
- School: St Patrick's College, Wellington
- Notable relative: Matt Proctor (brother)

Rugby union career
- Position(s): Centre, Fullback
- Current team: Wellington, Hurricanes
Senior career
| Years | Team | Apps | (Points) |
| 2017– | Wellington | 63 | (67) |
| 2019– | Hurricanes | 83 | (135) |
- Correct as of 11 July 2026
International career
| Years | Team | Apps | (Points) |
| 2018–2019 | New Zealand U20 | 12 | (10) |
| 2020–2022 | Māori All Blacks | 5 | (5) |
| 2023 | All Blacks XV | 1 | (20) |
| 2024– | New Zealand | 13 | (15) |
- Correct as of 11 July 2026

Billy Proctor (born 14 May 1999) is a New Zealand rugby union player who plays as a centre for Super Rugby club the Hurricanes and the New Zealand national team.

== Club career ==
In 2026, Proctor formed part of the Hurricanes squad which won the 2026 Super Rugby Pacific season. On 20 June, the Hurricanes defeated the Chiefs 60–5 in the final.

== International career ==
On 20 July 2024, Proctor made his All Blacks debut in the test match against Fiji played at Snapdragon Stadium in San Diego, California.

== Personal life ==
Proctor is a New Zealander of Māori descent (Ngāi Te Rangi and Ngāpuhi descent). He is the younger brother of former New Zealand international Matt Proctor.
