= Wellington (National Provincial Championship) =

NZ rugby union club, based in Wellington

- Official WRU emblem
- Union: Wellington Rugby Football Union
- Nickname: Lions
- Founded: 1879; 147 years ago
- Location: Thorndon, Wellington, New Zealand
- Ground: Hnry Stadium (Capacity: 34,500)
- CEO: Tony Giles
- Coach: Trent Renata
- Captain: Caleb Delany
- Most appearances: Bernie Fraser (121)
- Top scorer: Allan Hewson (893)
- Most tries: Bernie Fraser (105)
- League: National Provincial Championship
- 2025: 10th
Team kit

Official website
- www.wellingtonlions.co.nz

Wellington (often known as the Wellington Lions) are a New Zealand professional rugby union team based in Wellington, New Zealand. The union was originally established in 1879, with the National Provincial Championship established in 1976. They now play in the reformed National Provincial Championship competition. They play their home games at Hnry Stadium in Wellington. The team is affiliated with the Hurricanes Super Rugby franchise. Their home playing colours are black and gold.

== Current squad ==
The Wellington Lions squad for the 2026 Hilux NPC season is:

2026 Wellington squad
**Props**: (New Zealand) Geordie Bean ^{DEV} (Note: Bean wasn't named in the original Wellington squad, but was announced in the side for Round 1.); (New Zealand) Bradley Crichton ^{ST} (Note: Crichton wasn’t named in the original Wellington squad, but was announced in the side for Round 5.); (New Zealand) Alex Hewitt; (New Zealand) Siale Lauaki; (New Zealand) **Xavier Numia**; (Fiji) **Samu Tawake**; (United States) **Jake Turnbull**; **Hookers**: (New Zealand) **Asafo Aumua**; (Tonga) **Sekope Lopeti-Moli**; (New Zealand) James O'Reilly; (New Zealand) Penieli Poasa; (New Zealand) Kaleb Saxon ^{DEV} (Note: Saxon wasn’t named in the original Wellington squad, but was announced in the side for Round 6.); **Locks**: (New Zealand) Caleb Delany **(c)**; (New Zealand) Johnny Falloon; (New Zealand) Hugo Plummer; (New Zealand) Sam Thomson	**Loose forwards**: (New Zealand) Sione Halalilo; (New Zealand) **Du'Plessis Kirifi**; (New Zealand) **Peter Lakai**; (New Zealand) Matolu Petaia; (Fiji) Rupeni Raviyawa; (New Zealand) Dominic Ropeti; (New Zealand) **Ardie Savea**; (England) **Brad Shields** (injured); (Samoa) **Murphy Taramai**; (Japan) Kenkichi Yanagawa; **Halfbacks (scrum-halves)**: (New Zealand) Logan Henry; (New Zealand) **Kyle Preston**; (New Zealand) Riley Williams; **First five-eighths (fly-halves)**: (New Zealand) Jackson Garden-Bachop (injured); (New Zealand) Callum Harkin; (New Zealand) **Ruben Love**; (New Zealand) Piri Paraone; (New Zealand) Jordan Soli	**Midfielders (centres)**: (New Zealand) Ben Gordon (injured); (New Zealand) Riley Higgins (injured); (New Zealand) **Billy Proctor**; (New Zealand) **Matt Proctor**; (Australia) Jackson Ropata; (New Zealand) **Julian Savea**; **Outside backs**: (New Zealand) Cameron Burgess; (New Zealand) William Davis-Lenz ^{DEV} (Note: Davis-Lenz wasn't named in the original Wellington squad, but was named as a late inclusion in the side for Round 4.); (Samoa) **Losi Filipo**; (Japan) Reo Matsushita; (Australia) Divad Palu; (New Zealand) Isi Saumaki ^{DEV} (Note: Saumaki wasn't named in the original Wellington squad, but was announced in the side for Round 2.); (New Zealand) Stanley Solomon
**(c)** denotes the team captain. **Bold** denotes internationally capped players.^{ST} denotes a short-term signing.^{DEV} denotes a development squad member. denotes an injured player. Source:

== Honours ==
Wellington have been overall Champions on six occasions. Their first title was in 1978 and their most recent title was in 2024. Their full list of honours include:

National Provincial Championship First Division

- Winners: 1978, 1981, 1986, 2000.

Mitre 10 Cup Championship Division

- Winners: 2017.

Bunnings NPC

- Winners: 2022, 2024.

== Current Super Rugby players ==
Players named in the 2025 Wellington Lions squad, who also earned contracts or were named in a squad for any side participating in the 2025 Super Rugby Pacific season.

Player	Team
Asafo Aumua	Hurricanes
Tjay Clarke	Hurricanes
Caleb Delany	Hurricanes
Losi Filipo	Moana Pasifika
Jackson Garden-Bachop	Moana Pasifika
Callum Harkin	Hurricanes
Riley Higgins	Hurricanes
Du'Plessis Kirifi	Hurricanes
Peter Lakai	Hurricanes
Siale Lauaki	Hurricanes
Ruben Love	Hurricanes
Xavier Numia	Hurricanes
Hugo Plummer	Hurricanes
Kyle Preston	Crusaders
Billy Proctor	Hurricanes
Matt Proctor	Force
Ardie Savea	Moana Pasifika
Julian Savea	Moana Pasifika
PJ Sheck	Blues
Brad Shields	Hurricanes
