= Counties Manukau (National Provincial Championship) =

New Zealand rugby union team

- CMRFU official emblem
- Union: Counties Manukau Rugby Football Union
- Nickname: Steelers
- Founded: 1955; 71 years ago
- Location: Pukekohe, Auckland, New Zealand
- Ground: Navigation Homes Stadium (Capacity: 12,000)
- Coach: Reon Graham
- Captain: Jimmy Tupou
- Most appearances: Alan Dawson (201)
- Top scorer: Danny Love (698)
- Most tries: Alan Dawson (58)
- League: National Provincial Championship
- 2025: 8th Quarter-finals
Team kit

Official website
- www.steelers.co.nz

Counties Manukau (often known as the Counties Steelers) are a New Zealand professional rugby union team based in Pukekohe, New Zealand. The union was originally established in 1955, with the National Provincial Championship established in 1976. They now play in the reformed National Provincial Championship competition. They play their home games at Navigation Homes Stadium in Pukekohe in the Auckland region. The team is affiliated with the Chiefs Super Rugby franchise. Their home playing colours are black, white and red.

== Current squad ==
The Counties Manukau Steelers squad for the 2026 Hilux NPC season is:

2026 Counties Manukau squad
**Props**: (Samoa) **Jarred Adams**; (Tonga) Vainikolo Fifita; (New Zealand) Olive Lam-Yuen ^{WTG}; (United States) **Ezekiel Lindenmuth**; (New Zealand) Kurene Luamanuvae; (Tonga) **Atu Moli**; (New Zealand) Thomas Polo; **Hookers**: (New Zealand) Austin Atiga ^{WTG}; (New Zealand) Rico McQuoid ^{WTG}; (New Zealand) Ioane Moananu; (New Zealand) Ian West-Stevens; **Locks**: (New Zealand) Joshua Balme; (New Zealand) Stanley Liufau ^{WTG}; (New Zealand) Leo Ngatai-Tafau ^{ST} (Note: Ngatai-Tafau wasn't named in the original Counties Manukau squad, but was announced in the side for Round 3.); (Tonga) **Veikoso Poloniati**; (New Zealand) Boston Schuster ^{WTG}; (Tonga) **Sione Takai**; (Australia) Ola Tauelangi; (Tonga) **Jimmy Tupou** **(c)**; (New Zealand) Reegan Wheeler ^{WTG}	**Loose forwards**: (New Zealand) Adam Brash; (New Zealand) Cam Church; (New Zealand) Malcolm Fa'avela ^{WTG}; (Samoa) **Alamanda Motuga**; (Fiji) Tomasi Setitaia ^{WTG}; (New Zealand) Jonty Short; (New Zealand) Joey Taumateine (injured); (Fiji) Aporosa Vuniyayawa; **Halfbacks (scrum-halves)**: (New Zealand) Cohen Brady-Leathem; (Samoa) **Melani Matavao**; (New Zealand) **Cam Roigard**; (Samoa) **Jonathan Taumateine**; **First five-eighths (fly-halves)**: (Samoa) **AJ Alatimu**; (New Zealand) Joshua Penney ^{WTG}; (New Zealand) Jackson Rainsford	**Midfielders (centres)**: (New Zealand) Tevita Ofa; (New Zealand) Gibson Popoali'i; (Tonga) Rodney Tongotea ^{WTG}; (Samoa) **Tuna Tuitama**; (New Zealand) Larenz Tupaea-Thomsen ^{WTG}; **Outside backs**: (Samoa) **Tomasi Alosio** ^{WTG}; (New Zealand) Tim Brady; (New Zealand) Josh Gray; (New Zealand) Blake Makiri; (Fiji) Peniasi Malimali; (New Zealand) Sione Molia; (New Zealand) Adam Morrison; (New Zealand) Antonio Popoali'i; (New Zealand) Simon-Peter Toleafoa; (Tonga) **Josiah Unga** ^{WTG}
**(c)** denotes the team captain. **Bold** denotes internationally capped players.^{ST} denotes a short-term signing.^{WTG} denotes a wider training group member. denotes an injured player. Source:

== Honours ==
Counties Manukau have been overall Champions on one occasion, winning the title in 1979. Their full list of honours include:

National Provincial Championship First Division

- Winners: 1979

National Provincial Championship Second Division

- Winners: 1993

ITM Cup Championship Division

- Winners: 2012

== Current Super Rugby players ==
Players named in the 2025 Counties Manukau Steelers squad, who also earned contracts or were named in a squad for any side participating in the 2025 Super Rugby Pacific season.

Player	Team
Riley Hohepa	Hurricanes
Ioane Moananu	Crusaders
Alamanda Motuga	Moana Pasifika
Etene Nanai-Seturo	Chiefs
Tevita Ofa	Moana Pasifika
Dalton Papali'i	Blues
Cam Roigard	Hurricanes
Hoskins Sotutu	Blues
Jonathan Taumateine	Moana Pasifika
Zuriel Togiatama	Drua
Jimmy Tupou	Chiefs
Emosi Tuqiri	Drua
