= List of 2022–23 Super Rugby transfers =

This is a list of player movements for Super Rugby teams prior to the end of the 2023 Super Rugby Pacific season. Departure and arrivals of all players that were included in a Super Rugby squad for 2022 or 2023 are listed here, regardless of when it occurred. Future-dated transfers are only included if confirmed by the player or his agent, his former team or his new team.

Notes

- 2022 players listed are all players that were named in the initial senior squad, or subsequently included in a 23-man match day squad at any game during the season.
- (did not play) denotes that a player did not play at all during the season due to injury or non-selection. These players are included to indicate they were contracted to the team.
- (short-term) denotes that a player wasn't initially contracted, but came in during the season. This could either be a club rugby player coming in as injury cover, or a player whose contract had expired at another team (typically in the northern hemisphere).
- (development squad) denotes a player that wasn't named in the original squad, but was announced as signing as a development player. These are often younger players or club players. Different teams use different names for development players. Other names used include (wider training group) or (wider training squad).
- Flags are only shown for players moving to or from another country.
- Players may play in several positions, but are listed in only one.

== Fiji ==
=== Drua ===
The Fijian Drua joined Super Rugby in 2022. Due to travel restrictions as a consequence of the COVID-19 pandemic, the team was temporarily based in Lennox Head, New South Wales (Australia) for the 2022 season. Ahead of the 2023 Super Rugby Pacific season, on 11 October 2022, the Fijian Drua's permanent home base was opened by World Rugby Chairman Sir Bill Beaumont in Nadi, Fiji. The team will play its home games at Churchill Park in Lautoka and HFC Bank Stadium in Suva.

Drua transfers 2022–2023
Pos	2022 squad	Out	In	2023 players
PR	Haereiti Hetet; Jone Koroiduadua; Manasa Saulo; Timoci Sauvoli; Samu Tawake; Jone Tiko (short-term); Meli Tuni; Kaliopasi Uluilakepa	(substituted off) Manasa Saulo (to (France) Soyaux Angoulême)	(substituted in) Mesake Doge (from (Wales) Dragons); (substituted in) Livai Natave (from Suva); (substituted in) Emosi Tuqiri (from (Australia) Rebels)	Mesake Doge; Haereiti Hetet; Jone Koroiduadua; Livai Natave; Timoci Sauvoli; Samu Tawake; Jone Tiko (short-term); Meli Tuni; Emosi Tuqiri; Kaliopasi Uluilakepa
HK	Mesu Dolokoto; Tevita Ikanivere; Zuriel Togiatama		(substituted in) Jone Naqiri (from Namosi)	Mesu Dolokoto; Tevita Ikanivere; Jone Naqiri (development squad); Zuriel Togiatama
LK	Chris Minimbi; Isoa Nasilasila; Viliame Rarasea; Ratu Leone Rotuisolia; Sorovakatini Tuifagalele	(substituted off) Viliame Rarasea (to (New Zealand) Counties Manukau)	(substituted in) Sailosi Vakalokalo (from Skipper Cup); (substituted in) Etonia Waqa (from (New Zealand) Bay of Plenty)	Chris Minimbi; Isoa Nasilasila; Ratu Leone Rotuisolia; Sorovakatini Tuifagalele; Sailosi Vakalokalo (development squad); Etonia Waqa (short-term)
BR	Te Ahiwaru Cirikidaveta; Meli Derenalagi; Vilive Miramira; Raikabula Momoedonu; Nemani Nagusa; Rusiate Nasove; Kitione Salawa Jr. Joseva Tamani	(substituted off) Nemani Nagusa (to Nadroga)	(substituted in) Elia Canakaivata (from Fiji Sevens); (substituted in) Joji Kunavula (from Nadroga); (substituted in) Naibuka Matadigo (from Skipper Cup); (substituted in) Motikai Murray (from Suva); (substituted in) Fred Ralulu (from Skipper Cup)	Elia Canakaivata; Te Ahiwaru Cirikidaveta; Meli Derenalagi; Joji Kunavula (development squad); Naibuka Matadigo (development squad); Vilive Miramira; Raikabula Momoedonu; Motikai Murray (development squad); Rusiate Nasove; Fred Ralulu (development squad); Kitione Salawa Jr. Joseva Tamani
SH	Simione Kuruvoli; Frank Lomani (short-term); Ratu Peni Matawalu; Leone Nawai; Josh Vuta (short-term)	(substituted off) Leone Nawai (to Suva); (substituted off) Josh Vuta (released)	(substituted in) Philip Baselala (from Suva)	Philip Baselala; Simione Kuruvoli; Frank Lomani; Ratu Peni Matawalu
FH	Napolioni Bolaca; Baden Kerr; Caleb Muntz; Teti Tela	(substituted off) Napolioni Bolaca (to Fiji Sevens); (substituted off) Baden Kerr (released)	(substituted in) Isikeli Rabitu (from Skipper Cup)	Caleb Muntz; Isikeli Rabitu (development squad); Teti Tela
CE	Kalione Nasoko; Apisalome Vota; Serupepeli Vularika	(substituted off) Serupepeli Vularika (to Suva)	(substituted in) Iosefo Masi (from Fiji Sevens); (substituted in) Michael Naitokani (from Nadroga); (substituted in) Aisea Tuisese (from Naitasiri); (substituted in) Kemu Valetini (from (Australia) Manly)	Iosefo Masi; Michael Naitokani; Kalione Nasoko; Aisea Tuisese (development squad); Kemu Valetini (short-term); Apisalome Vota
WG	Ilaisa Droasese (short-term); Vinaya Habosi; Jona Mataiciwa (short-term); Onisi Ratave; Kitione Ratu; Kalaveti Ravouvou; Selestino Ravutaumada	(substituted off) Vinaya Habosi (to (France) Racing 92); (substituted off) Jona Mataiciwa (released); (substituted off) Onisi Ratave (to (Italy) Benetton); (substituted off) Kitione Ratu (to Vatukoula)	(substituted in) Taniela Rakuro (from Nadroga); (substituted in) Eroni Sau (from (France) Provence)	Ilaisa Droasese; Taniela Rakuro (short-term); Kalaveti Ravouvou; Selestino Ravutaumada; Eroni Sau
FB	Tuidraki Samusamuvodre; Kitione Taliga; Alivereti Veitokani	(substituted off) Alivereti Veitokani (to Namosi)	(substituted in) Jack Volavola (from Nadroga)	Tuidraki Samusamuvodre; Kitione Taliga; Jack Volavola (development squad)
Coach	Mick Byrne			Mick Byrne

== Pacific Islands ==
=== Moana Pasifika ===
Moana Pasifika joined Super Rugby in 2022. The team is based in Auckland and will play its home games at Mt Smart Stadium until 2028.

Moana Pasifika transfers 2022–2023
Pos	2022 squad	Out	In	2023 players
PR	Joe Apikotoa; Chris Apoua; Suetena Asomua (short-term); Sekope Kepu; Tau Koloamatangi; Ezekiel Lindenmuth; Abraham Pole (short-term); Isi Tuʻungafasi			Joe Apikotoa; Chris Apoua; Suetena Asomua (short-term); Sekope Kepu; Tau Koloamatangi; Ezekiel Lindenmuth; Abraham Pole; Isi Tuʻungafasi
HK	Sam Moli; Ray Niuia; Joe Royal (short-term); Luteru Tolai			Sam Moli; Ray Niuia; Joe Royal (short-term); Luteru Tolai
LK	Xavier Cowley-Tuioti (short-term); Don Lolo; Mike McKee; Alex McRobbie; Mahonri Ngakuru (short-term); Veikoso Poloniati; Sam Slade	(substituted off) Xavier Cowley-Tuioti (released); (substituted off) Don Lolo (released); (substituted off) Veikoso Poloniati (to (France) Racing 92)	(substituted in) Potu Leavasa Jr. (from (New Zealand) Manawatu)	Potu Leavasa Jr. (short-term); Mike McKee; Alex McRobbie; Mahonri Ngakuru; Sam Slade
BR	Michael Curry (short-term); Penitoa Finau; Solomone Funaki; Lotu Inisi; Niko Jones (short-term); Josh Kaifa (short-term); Jack Lam; Alamanda Motuga; Henry Stowers; Sione Tuipulotu	(substituted off) Josh Kaifa (returned to (New Zealand) Hawke's Bay); (substituted off) Henry Stowers (to (Italy) Benetton)	(substituted in) Miracle Faiʻilagi (from Samoa Sevens); (substituted in) Jonah Mau'u (from (New Zealand) Northland)	Michael Curry; Miracle Faiʻilagi; Penitoa Finau; Solomone Funaki; Lotu Inisi; Niko Jones (short-term); Jack Lam; Jonah Mau'u (short-term); Alamanda Motuga; Sione Tuipulotu
SH	Ere Enari; Manu Paea; Dwayne Polataivao (short-term); Jonathan Taumateine	(substituted off) Dwayne Polataivao (released)	(substituted in) Sam Wye (from (New Zealand) Auckland)	Ere Enari; Manu Paea; Jonathan Taumateine; Sam Wye (short-term)
FH	William Havili; Christian Lealiifano; D'Angelo Leuila (short-term); Lincoln McClutchie			William Havili; Christian Lealiifano; D'Angelo Leuila; Lincoln McClutchie
CE	Levi Aumua; Fine Inisi; Solomone Kata; Henry Taefu; Danny Toala	(substituted off) Solomone Kata (to (England) Exeter Chiefs)		Levi Aumua; Fine Inisi; Henry Taefu; Danny Toala
WG	Nigel Ah Wong (short-term); Tomasi Alosio; Tima Fainga'anuku; Neria Fomai; Timoci Tavatavanawai; Anzelo Tuitavuki	(substituted off) Nigel Ah Wong (to (New Zealand) Bay of Plenty)		Tomasi Alosio; Tima Fainga'anuku; Neria Fomai; Timoci Tavatavanawai; Anzelo Tuitavuki
FB	Lolagi Visinia			Lolagi Visinia
Coach	Aaron Mauger			Aaron Mauger

== See also ==
- List of 2022–23 Premiership Rugby transfers
- List of 2022–23 United Rugby Championship transfers
- List of 2022–23 Top 14 transfers
- List of 2022–23 RFU Championship transfers
- List of 2022–23 Rugby Pro D2 transfers
- SANZAAR
- Super Rugby franchise areas
