= List of 2021–22 Super Rugby transfers =

This is a list of player movements for Super Rugby teams prior to the end of the 2022 Super Rugby Pacific season. Departure and arrivals of all players that were included in a Super Rugby squad for 2021 or 2022 are listed here, regardless of when it occurred. Future-dated transfers are only included if confirmed by the player or his agent, his former team or his new team.

Notes

- 2021 players listed are all players that were named in the initial senior squad, or subsequently included in a 23-man match day squad at any game during the season.
- (did not play) denotes that a player did not play at all during one of the two seasons due to injury or non-selection. These players are included to indicate they were contracted to the team.
- (short-term) denotes that a player wasn't initially contracted, but came in during the season. This could either be a club rugby player coming in as injury cover, or a player whose contract had expired at another team (typically in the northern hemisphere).
- (development squad) denotes a player that wasn't named in the original squad, but was announced as signing as a development player. These are often younger players or club players. Different teams use different names for development players. Other names used include (wider training group) or (wider training squad).
- Flags are only shown for players moving to or from another country.
- Players may play in several positions, but are listed in only one.

== Fiji ==
=== Drua ===
The Fijian Drua will join Super Rugby in 2022, with New Zealand Rugby Union selecting them as preferred partners to join the competition. By February 2021, Fiji Rugby Union had completed the business plan for the team and was searching for additional funding for the side. On 14 April 2021, New Zealand Rugby Union confirmed the side had been granted a licence to join the Super Rugby competition. The team was officially confirmed in the competition in August 2021.

Drua transfers 2021–2022
Pos	2021 squad	Out	In	2022 players
PR	—N/a	—N/a	(substituted in) Haereiti Hetet (from (New Zealand) Bay of Plenty); (substituted in) Jone Koroiduadua (from Nadroga); (substituted in) Manasa Saulo (from (United States) Rugby ATL); (substituted in) Timoci Sauvoli (from Nadroga); (substituted in) Samu Tawake (from (United States) Rugby United NY); (substituted in) Jone Tiko (from (Australia) Wests); (substituted in) Meli Tuni (from Suva); (substituted in) Kaliopasi Uluilakepa (from (New Zealand) Northland)	Haereiti Hetet; Jone Koroiduadua; Manasa Saulo; Timoci Sauvoli; Samu Tawake; Jone Tiko (short-term); Meli Tuni; Kaliopasi Uluilakepa
HK	—N/a	—N/a	(substituted in) Mesu Dolokoto (from (Scotland) Glasgow Warriors); (substituted in) Tevita Ikanivere (from Suva); (substituted in) Zuriel Togiatama (from (New Zealand) Counties Manukau)	Mesu Dolokoto; Tevita Ikanivere; Zuriel Togiatama
LK	—N/a	—N/a	(substituted in) Te Ahiwaru Cirikidaveta (from (New Zealand) Tasman); (substituted in) Chris Minimbi (from Naitasiri); (substituted in) Isoa Nasilasila (from (Australia) Southern Districts); (substituted in) Viliame Rarasea (from (New Zealand) Counties Manukau); (substituted in) Ratu Leone Rotuisolia (from (Australia) Sydney University); (substituted in) Sorovakatini Tuifagalele (from Suva)	Te Ahiwaru Cirikidaveta; Chris Minimbi; Isoa Nasilasila; Viliame Rarasea; Ratu Leone Rotuisolia; Sorovakatini Tuifagalele
BR	—N/a	—N/a	(substituted in) Meli Derenalagi (from Fiji Sevens); (substituted in) Vilive Miramira (from Nadi); (substituted in) Raikabula Momoedonu (from (New Zealand) Northland); (substituted in) Nemani Nagusa (from Nadroga); (substituted in) Rusiate Nasove (from Nadroga); (substituted in) Kitione Salawa Jr. (from Fiji Sevens); (substituted in) Joseva Tamani (from (Australia) NHRU Wildfires)	Meli Derenalagi; Vilive Miramira; Raikabula Momoedonu; Nemani Nagusa; Rusiate Nasove; Kitione Salawa Jr. Joseva Tamani
SH	—N/a	—N/a	(substituted in) Simione Kuruvoli (from Tailevu); (substituted in) Frank Lomani (from (Australia) Rebels); (substituted in) Ratu Peni Matawalu (from Namosi); (substituted in) Leone Nawai (from Suva); (substituted in) Josh Vuta (from (Australia) GPS)	Simione Kuruvoli; Frank Lomani (short-term); Ratu Peni Matawalu; Leone Nawai; Josh Vuta (short-term)
FH	—N/a	—N/a	(substituted in) Napolioni Bolaca (from Fiji Sevens); (substituted in) Baden Kerr (from (New Zealand) Karaka); (substituted in) Caleb Muntz (unattached); (substituted in) Kitione Taliga (from Fiji Sevens); (substituted in) Teti Tela (from (Australia) GPS)	Napolioni Bolaca; Baden Kerr; Caleb Muntz; Kitione Taliga; Teti Tela
CE	—N/a	—N/a	(substituted in) Kalione Nasoko (from Fiji Sevens); (substituted in) Kalaveti Ravouvou (from Namosi); (substituted in) Apisalome Vota (from Suva); (substituted in) Serupepeli Vularika (from (United States) LA Giltinis)	Kalione Nasoko; Kalaveti Ravouvou; Apisalome Vota; Serupepeli Vularika
WG	—N/a	—N/a	(substituted in) Ilaisa Droasese (from (Australia) Reds); (substituted in) Vinaya Habosi (from Namosi); (substituted in) Jona Mataiciwa (from (New Zealand) Bay of Plenty); (substituted in) Onisi Ratave (from (New Zealand) Bay of Plenty); (substituted in) Kitione Ratu (from Vatukoula); (substituted in) Selestino Ravutaumada (from New Zealand Warriors)	Ilaisa Droasese (short-term); Vinaya Habosi; Jona Mataiciwa (short-term); Onisi Ratave; Kitione Ratu; Selestino Ravutaumada
FB	—N/a	—N/a	(substituted in) Tuidraki Samusamuvodre (from (United States) New England Free Jacks); (substituted in) Alivereti Veitokani (from Namosi)	Tuidraki Samusamuvodre; Alivereti Veitokani
Coach	—N/a	—N/a	(substituted in) Mick Byrne (unattached)	Mick Byrne

== Pacific Islands ==
=== Moana Pasifika ===
Moana Pasifika will join Super Rugby in 2022, with New Zealand Rugby Union selecting them as preferred partners to join the competition. The team will be made up of players from Pacific Islands such as Fiji, Samoa and Tonga. The team will likely be based in New Zealand, with Auckland being suggested as a base for the side. On 14 April 2021, New Zealand Rugby Union confirmed the side had been granted a conditional licence to join the Super Rugby competition, before on 12 July 2021, granting the side a full licence to join the competition.

Moana Pasifika transfers 2021–2022
Pos	2021 squad	Out	In	2022 players
PR	—N/a	—N/a	(substituted in) Joe Apikotoa (from (New Zealand) Chiefs); (substituted in) Chris Apoua (from (New Zealand) Southland); Suetena Asomua (from (New Zealand) Counties Manukau); (substituted in) Sekope Kepu (from (New Zealand) Counties Manukau); (substituted in) Tau Koloamatangi (from (New Zealand) Otago); (substituted in) Ezekiel Lindenmuth (from (New Zealand) Chiefs); (substituted in) Abraham Pole (from (New Zealand) Otago); (substituted in) Isi Tu'ungafasi (from (New Zealand) Crusaders)	Joe Apikotoa; Chris Apoua; Suetena Asomua (short-term); Sekope Kepu; Tau Koloamatangi; Ezekiel Lindenmuth; Abraham Pole (short-term); Isi Tu'ungafasi
HK	—N/a	—N/a	(substituted in) Sam Moli (from (New Zealand) Tasman); (substituted in) Ray Niuia (from (New Zealand) Blues); (substituted in) Joe Royal (from (New Zealand) Counties Manukau); (substituted in) Luteru Tolai (from (New Zealand) Blues)	Sam Moli; Ray Niuia; Joe Royal (short-term); Luteru Tolai
LK	—N/a	—N/a	(substituted in) Xavier Cowley-Tuioti (from (New Zealand) North Harbour); (substituted in) Michael Curry (from (New Zealand) Moutere); (substituted in) Don Lolo (from (New Zealand) Taieri); (substituted in) Mike McKee (from (New Zealand) Southland); (substituted in) Alex McRobbie (from (New Zealand) Counties Manukau); (substituted in) Mahonri Ngakuru (from (New Zealand) Tasman); (substituted in) Veikoso Poloniati (from (New Zealand) Manawatu)	Xavier Cowley-Tuioti (short-term); Michael Curry (short-term); Don Lolo; Mike McKee; Alex McRobbie; Mahonri Ngakuru (short-term); Veikoso Poloniati
BR	—N/a	—N/a	(substituted in) Penitoa Finau (from (New Zealand) Bay of Plenty); (substituted in) Solomone Funaki (from (New Zealand) Hawke's Bay); (substituted in) Lotu Inisi (from (New Zealand) North Harbour); (substituted in) Niko Jones (from (New Zealand) Auckland); (substituted in) Josh Kaifa (from (New Zealand) Hawke's Bay); (substituted in) Jack Lam (from (New Zealand) Waikato); (substituted in) Alamanda Motuga (from (New Zealand) Counties Manukau); (substituted in) Sam Slade (from (New Zealand) Counties Manukau); (substituted in) Henry Stowers (from (Australia) Brumbies); (substituted in) Sione Tuipulotu (from (New Zealand) Auckland)	Penitoa Finau; Solomone Funaki; Lotu Inisi; Niko Jones (short-term); Josh Kaifa (short-term); Jack Lam; Alamanda Motuga; Sam Slade; Henry Stowers; Sione Tuipulotu
SH	—N/a	—N/a	(substituted in) Ere Enari (from (New Zealand) Crusaders); (substituted in) Manu Paea (from (New Zealand) Eden); (substituted in) Dwayne Polataivao (from (New Zealand) Northcote); (substituted in) Jonathan Taumateine (from (New Zealand) Hurricanes)	Ere Enari; Manu Paea; Dwayne Polataivao (short-term); Jonathan Taumateine
FH	—N/a	—N/a	(substituted in) William Havili (from (New Zealand) Tasman); (substituted in) Christian Lealiifano (from (Japan) Shining Arcs); (substituted in) D'Angelo Leuila (from (New Zealand) Waikato); (substituted in) Lincoln McClutchie (from (New Zealand) Hawke's Bay)	William Havili; Christian Lealiifano; D'Angelo Leuila (short-term); Lincoln McClutchie
CE	—N/a	—N/a	(substituted in) Levi Aumua (from (New Zealand) Tasman); (substituted in) Fine Inisi (from (New Zealand) North Harbour); (substituted in) Solomone Kata (from (Australia) Brumbies); (substituted in) Henry Taefu (from (Australia) Force); (substituted in) Danny Toala (from (New Zealand) Hurricanes)	Levi Aumua; Fine Inisi; Solomone Kata; Henry Taefu; Danny Toala
WG	—N/a	—N/a	(substituted in) Nigel Ah Wong (from (New Zealand) Old Boys Marist); (substituted in) Tomasi Alosio (from (New Zealand) Wellington); (substituted in) Tima Fainga'anuku (from (New Zealand) Manawatu); (substituted in) Neria Fomai (from (New Zealand) Hawke's Bay); (substituted in) Timoci Tavatavanawai (from (New Zealand) Tasman); (substituted in) Anzelo Tuitavuki (from (New Zealand) Hawke's Bay)	Nigel Ah Wong (short-term); Tomasi Alosio; Tima Fainga'anuku; Neria Fomai; Timoci Tavatavanawai; Anzelo Tuitavuki
FB	—N/a	—N/a	(substituted in) Lolagi Visinia (from (New Zealand) Hurricanes)	Lolagi Visinia
Coach	—N/a	—N/a	(substituted in) Aaron Mauger (unattached)	Aaron Mauger

== See also ==
- List of 2021–22 Premiership Rugby transfers
- List of 2021–22 United Rugby Championship transfers
- List of 2021–22 Top 14 transfers
- List of 2021–22 RFU Championship transfers
- List of 2021–22 Rugby Pro D2 transfers
- List of 2021–22 Major League Rugby transfers
- SANZAAR
- Super Rugby franchise areas
