= List of Fijian Drua players =

This is a list of rugby union footballers who have played for the Fijian Drua in Super Rugby. The list includes any player that has played in a regular season match, semi-final or final for the Drua, ordered by debut date and name. Fijian Drua first competed in the 2022 Super Rugby Pacific season.

== Players ==
No.	Name	Caps	Tries	C	P	DG	Points	Debut	Last
1	Te Ahiwaru Cirikidaveta	28	3				15	18/02/2022	18/05/2024
2	Meli Derenalagi	36	3				15	18/02/2022	23/03/2025
3	Mesu Dolokoto	35	2				10	18/02/2022	11/04/2026
4	Vinaya Habosi	11	5				25	18/02/2022	28/05/2022
5	Tevita Ikanivere	50	12				60	18/02/2022	31/05/2025
6	Baden Kerr	3		1	2		8	18/02/2022	12/03/2022
7	Jone Koroiduadua	20						18/02/2022	26/05/2024
8	Simione Kuruvoli	34	5	1	2		33	18/02/2022	29/05/2026
9	Peni Matawalu	41	1				5	18/02/2022	23/03/2025
10	Vilive Miramira	43	3				15	18/02/2022	29/05/2026
11	Caleb Muntz	23		14	5		43	18/02/2022	17/05/2025
12	Nemani Nagusa	8	1				5	18/02/2022	28/05/2022
13	Isoa Nasilasila	64	2				10	18/02/2022	29/05/2026
14	Viliame Rarasea	9						18/02/2022	28/05/2022
15	Onisi Ratave	11	6				30	18/02/2022	28/05/2022
16	Kitione Ratu	7						18/02/2022	20/05/2022
17	Kalaveti Ravouvou	26	6				30	18/02/2022	10/06/2023
18	Selestino Ravutaumada	47	12				60	18/02/2022	31/05/2025
19	Kitione Salawa	51	6				30	18/02/2022	29/05/2026
20	Manasa Saulo	12						18/02/2022	28/05/2022
21	Timoci Sauvoli	6	1				5	18/02/2022	28/05/2022
22	Samu Tawake	53						18/02/2022	29/05/2026
23	Apisalome Vota	25	6				30	18/02/2022	27/04/2024
24	Napolioni Bolaca	3						26/02/2022	01/04/2022
25	Leone Rotuisolia	36	3				15	26/02/2022	17/05/2025
26	Joseva Tamani	40	7				35	26/02/2022	29/05/2026
27	Kaliopasi Uluilakepa	11						26/02/2022	01/04/2023
28	Jona Mataiciwa	5						04/03/2022	20/05/2022
29	Rusiate Nasove	7	1				5	04/03/2022	21/04/2023
30	Teti Tela	24	1	34	17		124	04/03/2022	10/06/2023
31	Frank Lomani	42	9	16	3		86	12/03/2022	16/05/2026
32	Zuriel Togiatama	50	1				5	12/03/2022	29/05/2026
33	Sorovakatini Tuifagalele	8						12/03/2022	25/03/2023
34	Chris Minimbi	8						19/03/2022	29/04/2023
35	Haereiti Hetet	47	1				5	25/03/2022	02/05/2026
36	Tuidraki Samusamuvodre	31	3				15	01/04/2022	29/05/2026
37	Raikabula Momoedonu	2						09/04/2022	20/05/2022
38	Kitione Taliga	8						09/04/2022	21/04/2023
39	Jone Tiko	7						09/04/2022	12/05/2023
40	Leone Nawai	7						23/04/2022	17/05/2025
41	Meli Tuni	14	1				5	23/04/2022	29/05/2026
42	Ilaisa Droasese	39	10				50	20/05/2022	26/04/2026
43	Elia Canakaivata	53	15				75	25/02/2023	29/05/2026
44	Iosefo Masi	37	17				85	25/02/2023	31/05/2025
45	Taniela Rakuro	27	10				50	25/02/2023	29/05/2026
46	Emosi Tuqiri	31						25/02/2023	16/05/2026
47	Livai Natave	18						04/03/2023	23/03/2025
48	Eroni Sau	10	3				15	11/03/2023	10/06/2023
49	Kemu Valetini	34	1	16	7	1	61	11/03/2023	29/05/2026
50	Philip Baselala	10	1				5	01/04/2023	16/05/2026
51	Michael Naitokani	11	1				5	01/04/2023	11/05/2024
52	Kalione Nasoko	1						21/04/2023	21/04/2023
53	Etonia Waqa	37	6				30	06/05/2023	29/05/2026
54	Mesake Doge	45	4				20	20/05/2023	29/05/2026
55	Motikai Murray	18	3				15	10/06/2023	11/04/2026
56	Isaiah Armstrong-Ravula	40	2	66	41		265	24/02/2024	29/05/2026
57	Epeli Momo	14	2				10	24/02/2024	28/03/2026
58	Isikeli Rabitu	25	7	1			37	24/02/2024	29/05/2026
59	Mesake Vocevoce	39	2				10	24/02/2024	29/05/2026
60	Junior Ratuva	6	2				10	02/03/2024	22/02/2025
61	Waqa Nalaga	5	2				10	30/03/2024	08/06/2024
62	Vuate Karawalevu	9	4				20	15/02/2025	09/05/2025
63	Ponepati Loganimasi	17	6				30	15/02/2025	28/03/2026
64	Isoa Tuwai	21	1				5	15/02/2025	29/05/2026
65	Inia Tabuavou	16						22/02/2025	26/04/2026
66	Peni Ravai	20						22/02/2025	29/05/2026
67	Sailosi Vukalokalo	1						09/05/2025	09/05/2025
68	Issak Fines-Leleiwasa	13	1				5	14/02/2026	29/05/2026
69	Manasa Mataele	9	6				30	14/02/2026	29/05/2026
70	Temo Mayanavanua	7	2				10	14/02/2026	23/05/2026
71	Virimi Vakatawa	10	1				5	14/02/2026	29/05/2026
72	Penaia Cakobau	5	1				5	14/02/2026	23/05/2026
73	Kavaia Tagivetaua	6	1				5	20/02/2026	16/05/2026
74	Joji Nasova	5						28/02/2026	02/05/2026
75	Sairusi Ravudi	5	1				5	14/03/2026	29/05/2026
76	Iosefo Namoce	4						14/03/2026	23/05/2026
77	Isikeli Basiyalo	2	1				5	11/04/2026	18/04/2026
78	Maika Tuitubou	3						26/04/2026	23/05/2026
