= Onisi Ratave =

Fijian rugby union player

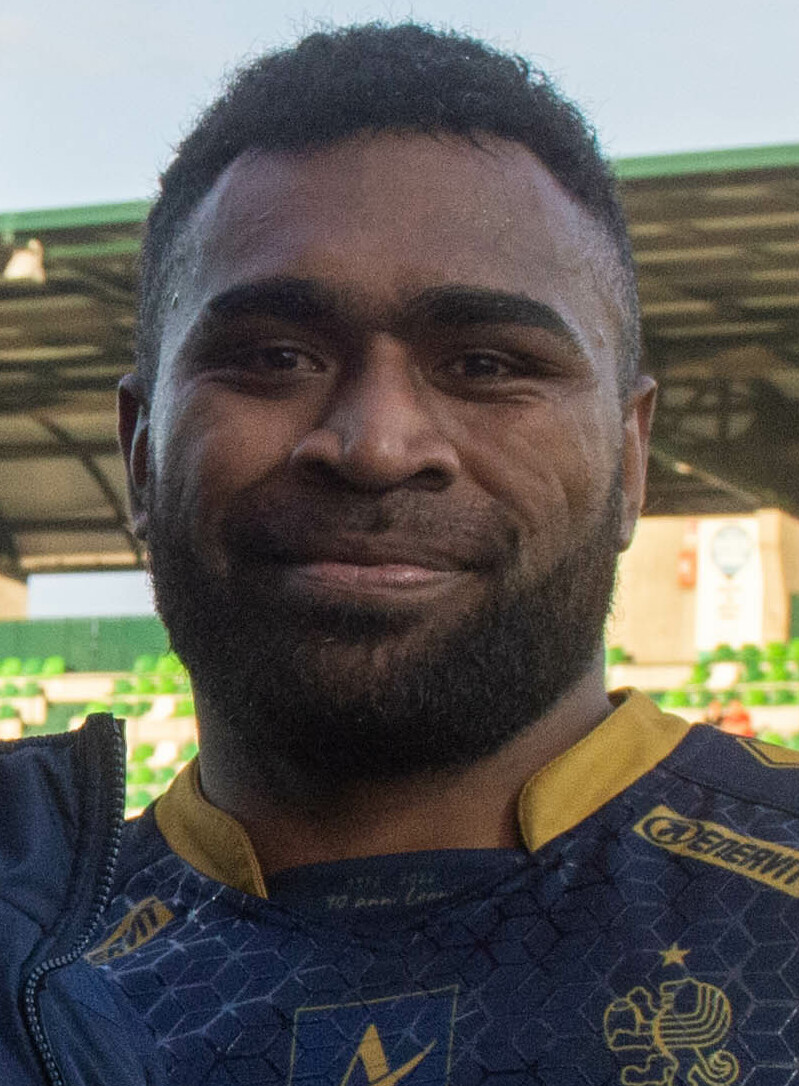
- Ratave in 2023
- Born: 6 June 1992 (age 34) Rewa, Fiji
- Height: 179 cm (5 ft 10 in)
- Weight: 99 kg (218 lb; 15 st 8 lb)
- School: John Wesley College

Rugby union career
- Position(s): Wing, Centre
- Current team: Benetton
Youth career
- Rewa Rugby
Senior career
Years	Team	Apps	(Points)
- Namosi
2021	Bay of Plenty	3	(15)
2022	Fijian Drua	11	(30)
2022−	Benetton	44	(85)
- Correct as of 4 June 2025

Onisi Ratave (born 6 June 1992) is a Fijian rugby union player who plays for Benetton Rugby in United Rugby Championship. His playing position is centre or wing. He is a fireman by profession.Having to play for Rewa and Namosi in the skipper cup competition.

== Early life ==
Ratave is a native of Gau Island in Fiji.

== Rugby career ==
=== Provincial rugby career ===
Ratave played for Namosi in the Skipper Cup, the Fiji Rugby Union's national provincial rugby union championship.

Ratave signed for the Bay of Plenty Steamers for the 2021 Bunnings National Provincial Championship. He scored a try on debut in a 31–11 win over Southland. In his next match, on 19 September against Hawke's Bay, he scored two tries in a narrow 36–33 defeat.

=== Super Rugby ===
On 21 September 2021, alongside Napolioni Bolaca, Tevita Ikanivere, Nemani Nagusa, and Simione Kuruvoli, Ratave was announced as one of the Fijian Drua's first five signings ahead of the 2022 Super Rugby Pacific season.

== International rugby ==
Ratave has formed part of extended squads of the Fiji sevens and Fiji national team.
