= Tuifagalele =

Tuifagalele is a surname. Notable people with the surname include:

- Laisa Laveti Tuifagalele (born 1967), Fijian judoka
- Sorovakatini Tuifagalele (born 1994), Fijian rugby union player
