= Gerard Cowley-Tuioti =

NZ rugby union player

- Full name: Gerard Tuioti-Mariner
- Born: 16 June 1992 (age 34) Auckland, New Zealand
- Height: 196 cm (6 ft 5 in)
- Weight: 112 kg (247 lb; 17 st 9 lb)
- School: Massey High School; Kelston Boys' High School
- Notable relative: Xavier Cowley-Tuioti (brother)

Rugby union career
- Position: Lock
- Current team: Kobelco Steelers
Senior career
Years	Team	Apps	(Points)
2014–2020	North Harbour	37	(10)
2016–2021	Blues	36	(15)
2021–	Kobelco Steelers	66	(70)
- Correct as of 12 April 2019

Gerard Cowley-Tuioti (born Gerard Tuioti-Mariner; June 16, 1992) is a New Zealand rugby union player who currently plays as a lock for Kobelco Kobe Steelers in Japan Rugby League One. He formerly played for North Harbour in New Zealand's domestic Mitre 10 Cup and the Blues in the international Super Rugby competition.

== Early career ==
Raised in Auckland, he was initially schooled at Massey High School but later attended Kelston Boys' High School and helped its team reach the semi-finals of their 1A competition in 2010.

== Senior career ==
Cowley-Tuioti first played provincial level rugby in New Zealand in 2014, turning out 5 times for North Harbour. He became a regular starter the following year, playing 10 times and then played a significant role in Harbour's successful 2016 campaign which saw them promoted from the Championship to the Premiership for 2017. Cowley-Tuioti played in all 12 games during the season, 11 of them from the start, and scored 1 try.

== Super Rugby ==
After just a season and a half's experience at national provincial championship level, Cowley-Tuioti was named in the Blues squad ahead of the 2016 Super Rugby season. The step up proved a tough one and he could only muster a solitary appearance from the replacements bench against the Brumbies during his debut campaign at that level. Despite this, his continued good form at domestic level with North Harbour ensured that Blues coach Tana Umaga retained him in his squad for 2017.

Cowley-Tuioti joined the Kobelco Kobe Steelers for the 2022 Japan Rugby League One season

== Career Honours ==
North Harbour

- Mitre 10 Cup Championship - 2016

== Super Rugby Statistics ==
As of 23 November 2016

Season	Team	Games	Starts	Sub	Mins	Tries	Cons	Pens	Drops	Points	Yel	Red
2016	Blues	1	0	1	16	0	0	0	0	0	0	0
Total		1	0	1	16	0	0	0	0	0	0	0
