= Sailosi Vukalokalo =

Fijian rugby union player

- Born: Fiji
- School: Queen Victoria School; Marist Brothers High School

Rugby union career
- Position: Lock
- Current team: Drua
Senior career
Years	Team	Apps	(Points)
2025–	Drua	1	(0)
- Correct as of 9 May 2025

Sailosi Vukalokalo is a Fijian rugby union player, who plays for the Drua. His preferred position is lock.

== Early career ==
Vukalokalo is from Cakaudrove Province and attended both Queen Victoria School and Marist Brothers High School. He plays his Skipper Cup rugby for Suva and Nadi.

== Professional career ==
Vukalokalo represented the Fiji Warriors in 2023. He was named in the Drua squad for the 2024 Super Rugby Pacific season but did not make an appearance, before then being named in the 2025 squad. He made his debut for the Drua in Round 13 of the 2025 Super Rugby Pacific season against the Blues, coming on as a replacement.
