= Michael Naitokani =

Fijian rugby union player (born 2000)

- Born: 9 March 2000 (age 26) CWM Hospital
- Height: 186 cm (6 ft 1 in)
- Weight: 85 kg (187 lb; 13 st 5 lb)
- School: Hastings Boys NZ Queen Victoria School CMF Primary School
- Notable relative: Mesu Dolokoto

Rugby union career
- Position: Centre
- Current team: Drua
Youth career
- Canterbury 2019: Crusaders Admy
Senior career
Years	Team	Apps	(Points)
2023–	Drua	6	(5)
- Correct as of 18 August 2023

Michael Naitokani (born 9 March 2000) from Yasawa village, Tawake Cakaudrove Province is a Fijian rugby union, who plays for the Fijian Warriors 2022 squad Drua in Super Rugby. His preferred position is centre.

== Early career ==
Naitokani is from Tawake in Cakaudrove Province. He attended Queen Victoria School and began playing rugby aged nine.

== Professional career ==
Played for Canterbury under19 in 2019 won Jock Hobbs tournament. Naitokani 2021 played along Pio Tuwai Jerry Tuwai Jiuta Wainiqolo Sireli Maqala in LAR Barbarian 7s team Naitokani was named in the Drua squad ahead of the 2023 Super Rugby Pacific season, having initially signed from Skipper Cup side Nadroga in October 2022. He made his debut ahead of Round 6 of the season against the Rebels, coming on as a replacement.
