= Livai Natave =

Fijian rugby union player (born 1999)

- Full name: Livai Rasala Natave
- Born: 20 April 1999 (age 27) Nadi, Fiji
- Height: 187 cm (6 ft 2 in)
- Weight: 114 kg (251 lb; 17 st 13 lb)

Rugby union career
- Position: Prop
- Current team: Worcester Warriors
Senior career
Years	Team	Apps	(Points)
2023–2025	Drua		
2025–	Worcester Warriors		
- Correct as of 4 December 2022
International career
Years	Team	Apps	(Points)
2017–2019	Fiji U20	9	(0)
2019	Fiji Warriors	1	(0)
2022–	Fiji	4	(0)
- Correct as of 4 December 2022

Livai Natave (born 20 April 1999) is a Fijian rugby union player who plays for Drua in Super Rugby. His playing position is prop. He was named in the Drua development squad for the 2023 Super Rugby Pacific season.

Natave is a naval officer by trade and represented Suva in the Skipper Cup. He was named in the Nadi team for 2023 season. He represented Fiji U20 between 2017 and 2019, and the Fiji Warriors in 2019. He was named in the Fijian Latui squad for the short-lived 2020 Global Rapid Rugby season, before being named as standby for the Fiji national team in July 2022. He was named to tour for the 2022 end-of-year rugby union internationals in October 2022, and made his international debut against Scotland, before winning a further cap and featuring against the Barbarians during the tour. He was then named in the Drua development squad for the 2023 season.
