= Henry Stowers =

New Zealander rugby union player

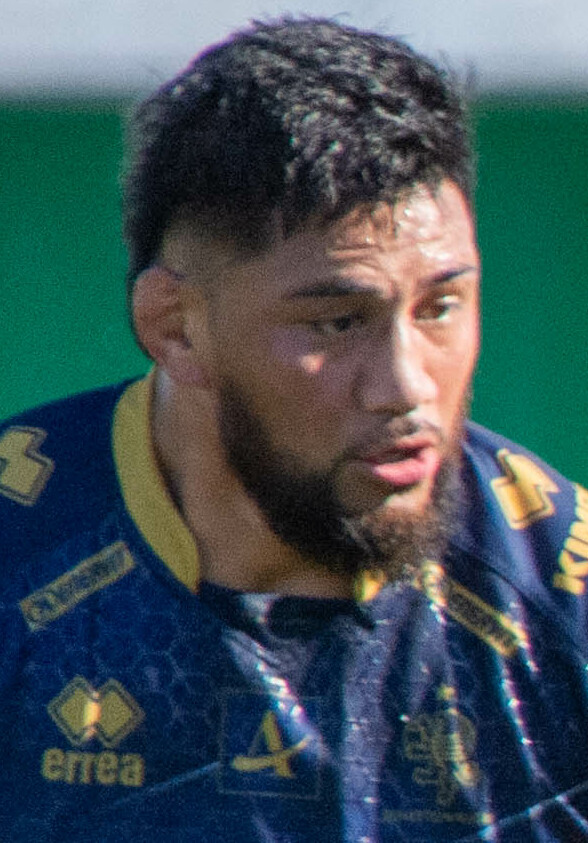
- Born: 3 March 1995 (age 31) New Zealand
- Height: 190 cm (6 ft 3 in)
- Weight: 110 kg (240 lb; 17 st 5 lb)

Rugby union career
- Position: Flanker
- Current team: Benetton
Amateur team(s)
Years	Team	Apps	(Points)
- Wainuiomata
Senior career
Years	Team	Apps	(Points)
2014–2015	Wellington	9	(10)
2016–2017	Bay of Plenty	17	(20)
2018–2019	Western Force	12	(25)
2021	NHRU Wildfires	4	(15)
2021	Canterbury	8	(35)
2022−2024	Benetton	22	(5)
- Correct as of 23 Sep 2022
Super Rugby
Years	Team	Apps	(Points)
2020	Western Force	17	(15)
2021	Brumbies	13	(5)
2022	Moana Pasifika	14	(10)
International career
Years	Team	Apps	(Points)
2014	Samoa U20	4	(0)
2015	New Zealand U20	4	(0)
2018	Samoa A	2	(0)
2018–2023	Samoa		
- Correct as of 26 August 2019

Henry Time-Stowers (born 3 March 1995) is a New Zealand-born Samoan rugby union player who plays primarily as a flanker or number eight. He has represented Samoa at international level and has previously played Super Rugby for the Western Force, Brumbies and Moana Pasifika, as well as in the United Rugby Championship for Benetton Rugby.

== Biography ==
Stowers was born in Lower Hutt, New Zealand, with family from Tafagamanu and Salea’aumua in Samoa. He was educated at Wainuiomata High School, before moving to Scots College, Wellington. Stowers trained with the Wellington Lions and Hurricanes academy from the age of fifteen and was selected for the Wellington Lions straight out of high school, marking the beginning of a promising career. He later represented three Super Rugby franchises—Western Force, ACT Brumbies, and Moana Pasifika—before making the move to Europe to compete in the URC.

== Career ==
=== Club ===
Stowers played rugby in high school. In 2012 he was selected for the Hurricanes under-18 team. He also played with the Wellington Under-19s, with whom he won the Provincial Under-19 Championship in 2014. He then played with local club Wainuiomata.

Stowers launched his professional career in 2014, playing with Wellington in the National Provincial Championship. After playing 5 games with Wellington, he moved to Bay of Plenty for the 2016 and 2017 seasons. At the beginning of 2016, he had the opportunity to train with the Chiefs franchise, and took part in a tour in Hong Kong with the franchise's Development team.

In 2018, he decided to join the Australian Western Force franchise which had just been excluded from Super Rugby, in order to compete in World Series Rugby. He also competed in the National Rugby Championship (NRC), and won this competition in 2019. The same year, his team also won Global Rapid Rugby, having finished the season undefeated. After two years at the Western Force, his side returned to Super Rugby, and Stowers made his Super Rugby AU debut on 11 July 2020 against the Waratahs. He played seven games during the competition, all of them as a starter. Despite his substantial playing time, he made a difficult decision to leave at the end of the season due to the covid epidemic.

In 2021, Stowers joined the NHRU Wildfires, newly integrated into the Shute Shield for the 2021 season. After several outstanding performances with his new club, he was recruited during the season by the Brumbies franchise, just before the final stages of Super Rugby AU. He played his first match in the final lost by his team against the Queensland Reds, in which Stowers played outstanding. He then continued with Super Rugby Unlocked, and played five matches.

Also in 2021, he returned to New Zealand with the province of Canterbury in the NPC.

In 2022, for the 2022 Super Rugby Pacific season, he joined the new Moana Pasifika franchise, which had just entered Super Rugby. He immediately established himself as the team's starting third centre line, with many touting him the inform number 8 in the competition. He played for Benetton Rugby in the United Rugby Championship from 2022 to 2023–24 United Rugby Championship season.

=== International ===
Stowers was selected with the Samoa under-20 team in 2014, and played in the World Junior Championship. He captained the team, and played in all four of his team's games, including the win over Scotland.

The following year he planned to represent New Zealand at the Junior Championship of Oceania, but an injury prevented him from doing so. Despite this, he was still selected to participate in the 2015 World Juniors in Italy. He played in his team's three pool matches, then in the semi-final won against France. However, he did not play in the final that his team won against England.

In 2018, he played in the World Rugby Pacific Challenge with the Samoa A team, of which he was immediately named captain.

In June 2019, he was selected for the first time with the Samoa team in order to participate in the Pacific Nations Cup 2019 and prepare for the World Cup in Japan. He played his first game for Samoa on 3 August 2019 against the United States. He played two games during the PNC, but ultimately was not selected for the RWC team. In 2021, he was recalled to the Samoan selection for the double confrontation against Tonga, qualifying for the next World Cup. The Samoans finally manage to qualify, having won by a wide margin in both matches.
