= Tafagamanu =

Village on the island of Upolu in Samoa

Coordinates: 13°56′21″S 171°56′37″W

Tafagamanu is a village on the island of Upolu in Samoa. The village is part of the Lefaga ma Faleaseela Electoral Constituency (Faipule District) which forms part of the larger A'ana political district.

The population is 350.
