= Emosi Tuqiri =

Fijian rugby union player (born 2000)

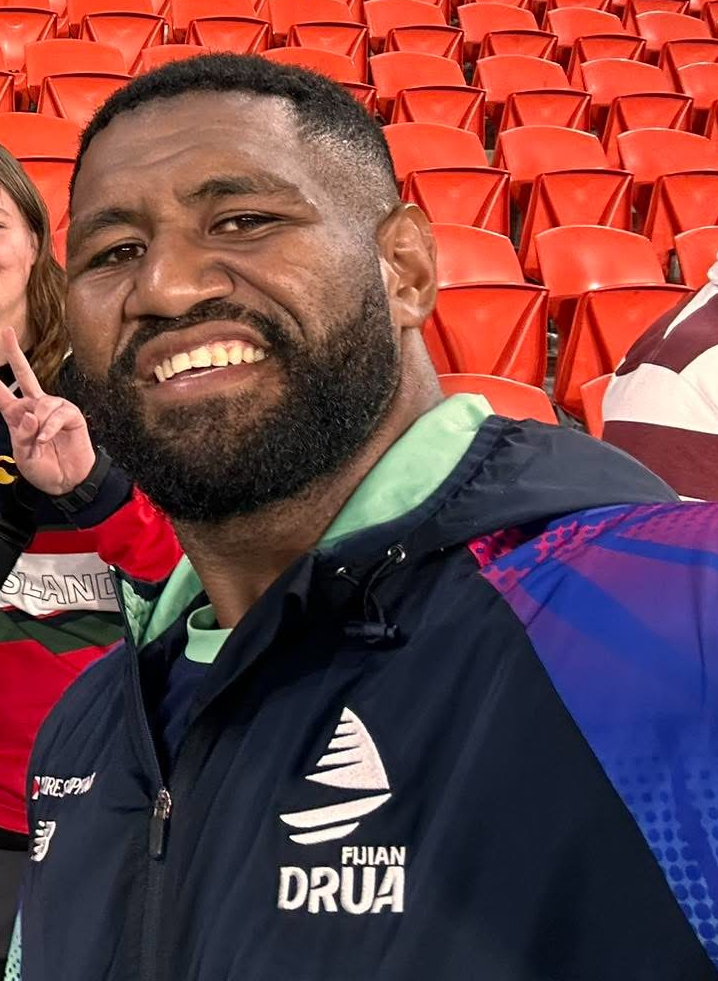
- Tuqiri in 2026
- Full name: Emosi Gabriel Tuqiri
- Born: 28 December 2000 (age 25) Namatakula, Fiji
- Height: 194 cm (6 ft 4 in)
- Weight: 120 kg (265 lb; 18 st 13 lb)
- School: Marist College Ashgrove
- Notable relative(s): Elia Tuqiri (father); Lote Tuqiri (cousin)

Rugby union career
- Position: Prop
- Current team: Fijian Drua
Senior career
Years	Team	Apps	(Points)
2018–2023	Brothers		
2022	Melbourne Rebels	0	(0)
2023–	Fijian Drua	17	(0)
- Correct as of 26 February 2023
International career
Years	Team	Apps	(Points)
2019	Fiji U20	5	(0)
2024	Fiji	1	(0)
- Correct as of 26 February 2023

Emosi Tuqiri (born 28 December 2000) is a Fijian rugby union player, currently playing for the Drua. His preferred position is prop.

== Early career ==
Described as a rugby prodigy and potential future Wallaby, Tuqiri studied and played Marist College Ashgrove and played for the Brothers rugby club in Brisbane.

Tuqiri is the son of former Brisbane Broncos and Waratahs player Elia Tuqiri, and the cousin of former Wallaby Lote Tuqiri. He is also related to Tevita Kuridrani, while also a relative of Noa Nadruku, Kirisi Kuridrani and Nemani Nadolo.

== Professional career ==
After a spell in the Queensland Reds academy, Tuqiri was named as a squad member of the Melbourne Rebels in 2022. Tuqiri signed with the Fijian Drua in October 2022, ahead of the 2023 Super Rugby Pacific season. He made his Drua debut in Round 1 of 2023, against Moana Pasifika.

In 2019, Tuqiri represented the Fiji U20 national side in the 2019 World Rugby Under 20 Championship.
