= Elia Tuqiri =

Australian rugby league player

Personal information
- Born: 6 March 1982 (age 44) Namatakula, Fiji
- Height: 185 cm (6 ft 1 in)
- Weight: 90 kg (14 st 2 lb)

Playing information

Rugby league
- Position: Wing
Club
Years	Team	Pld	T	G	FG	P
2002	Brisbane Broncos	2	0	0	0	0

Rugby union
Representative
Years	Team	Pld	T	G	FG	P
	NSW Waratahs	0	0	0	0	0
- Source: As of 6 October 2020
- Relatives: Lote Tuqiri (cousin); Nemani Nadolo (cousin); Tevita Kuridrani (cousin)

Elia Tuqiri (born 6 March 1982) is former professional rugby league and rugby union player who played for the Brisbane Broncos and NSW Waratahs. He is the cousin of dual international Lote Tuqiri, Fijian international winger Nemani Nadolo and Wallabies centre Tevita Kuridrani. They all hail from one of the most famous rugby nurseries in Fiji, Namatakula Village.

Elia is currently the assistant coach for GPS Rugby Union in Brisbane's Premier Rugby competition.
