= Mike McKee (rugby union) =

New Zealand rugby union player

- Born: Mike McKee; 12 August 1993 (age 33) Waikaia, New Zealand
- Height: 1.97 m (6 ft 6 in)
- Weight: 135 kg (21 st 4 lb; 298 lb)
- School: Otago Boys’ High School

Rugby union career
- Position: Lock
- Current team: Southland
Senior career
Years	Team	Apps	(Points)
2015–2017, 2019–	Southland	41	(5)
2018	Counties Manukau	4	(0)
2019–2020	Ciencias Sevilla CR	9	(15)
- Correct as of 29 October 2021
Super Rugby
Years	Team	Apps	(Points)
2022–	Moana Pasifika	0	(0)
- Correct as of 29 October 2021

Mike McKee (born 12 August 1993) is a New Zealand rugby union player who plays for Moana Pasifika in Super Rugby and Southland in the National Provincial Championship (NPC). His playing position is lock. McKee is of Cook Islands descent.

== Early life ==
McKee hails from Waikaia in Southland. He attended Otago Boys' High School in Dunedin.

== Rugby career ==
McKee made his professional debut for Southland on 10 October 2015 in an away 39–20 loss to Canterbury. He would make 20 appearances for the Southland Stags between 2015 and 2017. McKee would score his first try for the Stags on 7 October 2017 against Wellington.

During the 2018 Mitre 10 Cup season McKee played for Counties Manukau, making 4 appearances during the campaign.

McKee returned to the Stags in 2019, made 9 appearances that year and 8 in 2020.

McKee made a move to Spain to play for Ciencias Sevilla CR during the 2019–20 División de Honor de Rugby season, and scored 3 tries in 9 appearances.

On 25 October 2021 McKee was announced as having signed for Moana Pasifika ahead of the 2022 Super Rugby Pacific season.

== Personal life ==
McKee is of Cook Islands descent. McKee is the fourth member of his family to play for Southland. His grandfather Bill, uncle David, and cousin Scott all played for the Stags.
