= Xavier Cowley-Tuioti =

New Zealand rugby union player

- Born: 12 September 1994 (age 32) New Zealand
- Height: 194 cm (6 ft 4 in)
- Weight: 117 kg (258 lb; 18 st 6 lb)
- Notable relative: Gerard Cowley-Tuioti (brother)

Rugby union career
- Position: Lock
Senior career
Years	Team	Apps	(Points)
2019–2021	North Harbour	10	(0)
2022	Moana Pasifika	1	(0)
- Correct as of 22 November 2022

Xavier Cowley-Tuioti (born 12 September 1994) is a New Zealand rugby union player who plays for Moana Pasifika for the 2022 Super Rugby Pacific season, having been named in the squad for the rescheduled Round 1. His playing position is lock. He was also named in the North Harbour squad for the 2021 Bunnings NPC.
