= Ezekiel Lindenmuth =

- Full name: Ezekiel Vohn Lindenmuth
- Born: 14 July 1997 (age 29) Apia, Samoa
- Height: 187 cm (6 ft 2 in)
- Weight: 116 kg (256 lb; 18 st 4 lb)
- School: Mount Albert Grammar School

Rugby union career
- Position: Prop
- Current team: Counties Manukau, Chiefs
Senior career
Years	Team	Apps	(Points)
2018–2019	Auckland	5	(0)
2020-	Counties Manukau	12	(0)
2019–2020	Blues	7	(0)
2021-	Chiefs	1	(0)
- Correct as of 21 August 2021
International career
Years	Team	Apps	(Points)
2016	Samoa U20	2	(0)
2017	New Zealand U20	7	(5)
- Correct as of 21 August 2021

Ezekiel Vohn Lindenmuth (born 14 July 1997) is a Samoa-born American rugby union player who plays for the Chiefs in Super Rugby. His playing position is prop. He has signed for the Chiefs squad in 2021 as an Injury Replacement. He also plays for the Super Rugby franchise, Moana Pasifika.
