= Michael Curry (rugby union) =

Samoan rugby union player

- Born: 2 March 1994 (age 32) Vailima, Samoa
- Height: 196 cm (6 ft 5 in)
- Weight: 115 kg (254 lb; 18 st 2 lb)
- School: St Joseph's College, Samoa; Nelson College

Rugby union career
- Position(s): Lock, Flanker
- Current team: Moana Pasifika, Auckland
Senior career
Years	Team	Apps	(Points)
2018, 2023	Tasman	13	(0)
2020	Colorado Raptors	5	(0)
2021	Toyota Shokki	2	(0)
2022–	Moana Pasifika	19	(10)
2022	North Harbour	5	(0)
2024–	Auckland	5	(0)
- Correct as of 5 November 2024
International career
Years	Team	Apps	(Points)
2022–	Samoa	8	(0)
- Correct as of 5 November 2024

Michael Curry (born 2 March 1994) is a Samoan rugby union player who plays for Moana Pasifika in Super Rugby and Auckland in the Bunnings NPC. His position is lock or flanker. He previously represented the Colorado Raptors during the 2020 Major League Rugby season.

Curry was educated at Nelson College from 2011 to 2012.
