= Alex McRobbie =

New Zealand rugby union player

- Born: 14 February 2000 (age 26) Bombay Hills, New Zealand
- Height: 206 cm (6 ft 9 in)
- Weight: 110 kg (243 lb)
- School: Saint Kentigern College
- Notable relative: Kaitlyn Dalton (Wife)
- Occupation: Electrician

Rugby union career
- Position: Lock
- Current team: Counties Manukau, Moana Pasifika
Senior career
Years	Team	Apps	(Points)
2021–	Counties Manukau	1	(0)
2022–	Moana Pasifika		
- Correct as of 22 November 2021

Alex McRobbie is a New Zealand rugby union player who plays for Moana Pasifika in Super Rugby. His playing position is lock. He was named in the Moana Pasifika squad for the 2022 Super Rugby Pacific season. He also represented Counties Manukau in the 2021 Bunnings NPC.
