= Ray Niuia =

Samoa international rugby union player

- Born: Ray Niuia; 19 June 1991 (age 35) Auckland, New Zealand
- Height: 176 cm (5 ft 9 in)
- Weight: 110 kg (17 st 5 lb; 240 lb)
- School: Massey High School

Rugby union career
- Position: Hooker
Senior career
Years	Team	Apps	(Points)
2013–2016, 2022–2023	North Harbour	39	(15)
2018	Tasman	10	(0)
2021	Manawatu	7	(10)
- Correct as of 7 September 2023
Super Rugby
Years	Team	Apps	(Points)
2019	Highlanders	1	(0)
2020–2021	Blues	3	(0)
2022–2023	Moana Pasifika	12	(0)
- Correct as of 4 May 2023
International career
Years	Team	Apps	(Points)
2018–2023	Samoa	19	(20)
- Correct as of 14 August 2023

Raymond 'Ray' Niuia (born 19 June 1991) is a New Zealand born Samoan rugby union player most recently played for Moana Pasifika in Super Rugby. He has also played for both the Highlanders and the Blues. His position is Hooker.

== Bunnings NPC ==
Niuia made 26 appearances and scored 15 points for North Harbour in 4 seasons.

In 2018 Niuia made his debut for the Tasman Mako against Canterbury at Lansdowne Park. Niuia made 10 appearances for the Mako in the 2018 season as the side finished third in the premiership division. Niuia missed the 2019 Mitre 10 Cup due to commitments with Samoa and the 2020 Mitre 10 Cup with injury as the Mako won back to back premiership titles.

Niuia signed with the Manawatu Turbos for the 2021 Bunnings NPC.

== Super Rugby ==
Niuia was named in the 2019 Highlanders squad but only played 1 game before being named in the Blues squad for the 2020 Super Rugby season. He suffered a season ending injury on his Blues debut. Niuia finally returned from injury in Round 5 of the Super Rugby Trans-Tasman competition in 2021 against the Western Force and came off the bench the following week in the final of the competition against the Highlanders in a 23-15 win for the Blues. He signed with Moana Pasifika for the 2022 Super Rugby Pacific season.

== Samoa ==
On 23 August 2019, he was named in Samoa's 34 man training squad for the 2019 Rugby World Cup, before being named in the final 31 on 31 August.
