= Chris Apoua =

New Zealand rugby union player

- Born: 30 January 1992 (age 34) Auckland, New Zealand
- Height: 186 cm (6 ft 1 in)
- Weight: 119 kg (262 lb; 18 st 10 lb)

Rugby union career
- Position: Prop
Senior career
Years	Team	Apps	(Points)
2016–2017, 2022–2025	Northland	20	(10)
2018	Timișoara Saracens	3	(0)
2018–2021	Southland	32	(0)
- Correct as of 11 July 2026
Super Rugby
Years	Team	Apps	(Points)
2022–2026	Moana Pasifika	33	(10)
- Correct as of 11 July 2026

Chris Apoua (born 30 January 1992) is a New Zealand rugby union player who played for Moana Pasifika. His position is prop.
