= Sione Tuipulotu (rugby union, born December 1997) =

New Zealand rugby union player

- Born: 2 December 1997 (age 28) New Zealand
- Height: 195 cm (6 ft 5 in)
- Weight: 115 kg (254 lb; 18 st 2 lb)
- School: Wesley College

Rugby union career
- Position(s): Lock, Flanker, Number 8
- Current team: AZ-COM Maruwa MOMOTARO’S
Senior career
Years	Team	Apps	(Points)
2019	Manawatu	11	(0)
2020–2021, 2023	Auckland	9	(5)
2022–2023	Moana Pasifika	12	(5)
2022	Hawke's Bay	1	(0)
2024–	AZ-COM Maruwa MOMOTARO’S	20	(20)
- Correct as of 7 December 2025
International career
Years	Team	Apps	(Points)
2015	Tonga U20	4	(0)
2016	Samoa U20	5	(0)
2022–	Tonga	4	(0)
- Correct as of 29 July 2022

Sione Tuipulotu (born 2 December 1997) is a Tongan rugby union player, who currently plays as a lock or loose forward for AZ-COM Maruwa MOMOTARO’S in Japan's regional Top East League Group A competition.

He previously played for Moana Pasifika in Super Rugby.

Tuipulotu also played in New Zealand's domestic National Provincial Championship competition for Manawatu (2019), Auckland (2020, 2021, 2023) and Hawke's Bay (2022).

Tuipulotu played for both Samoa and Tonga's Under 20 sides, while also being called up to the New Zealand Under 20 training squad.

On 27 May 2022, Tuipulotu was named in the Tongan national team for the 2022 Pacific Nations Cup and the Asia/Pacific qualification match for the 2023 Rugby World Cup. He made his international test debut for Tonga on 2 July 2022 against Fiji.
