= Alivereti Veitokani =

Fiji rugby union player (born 1992)

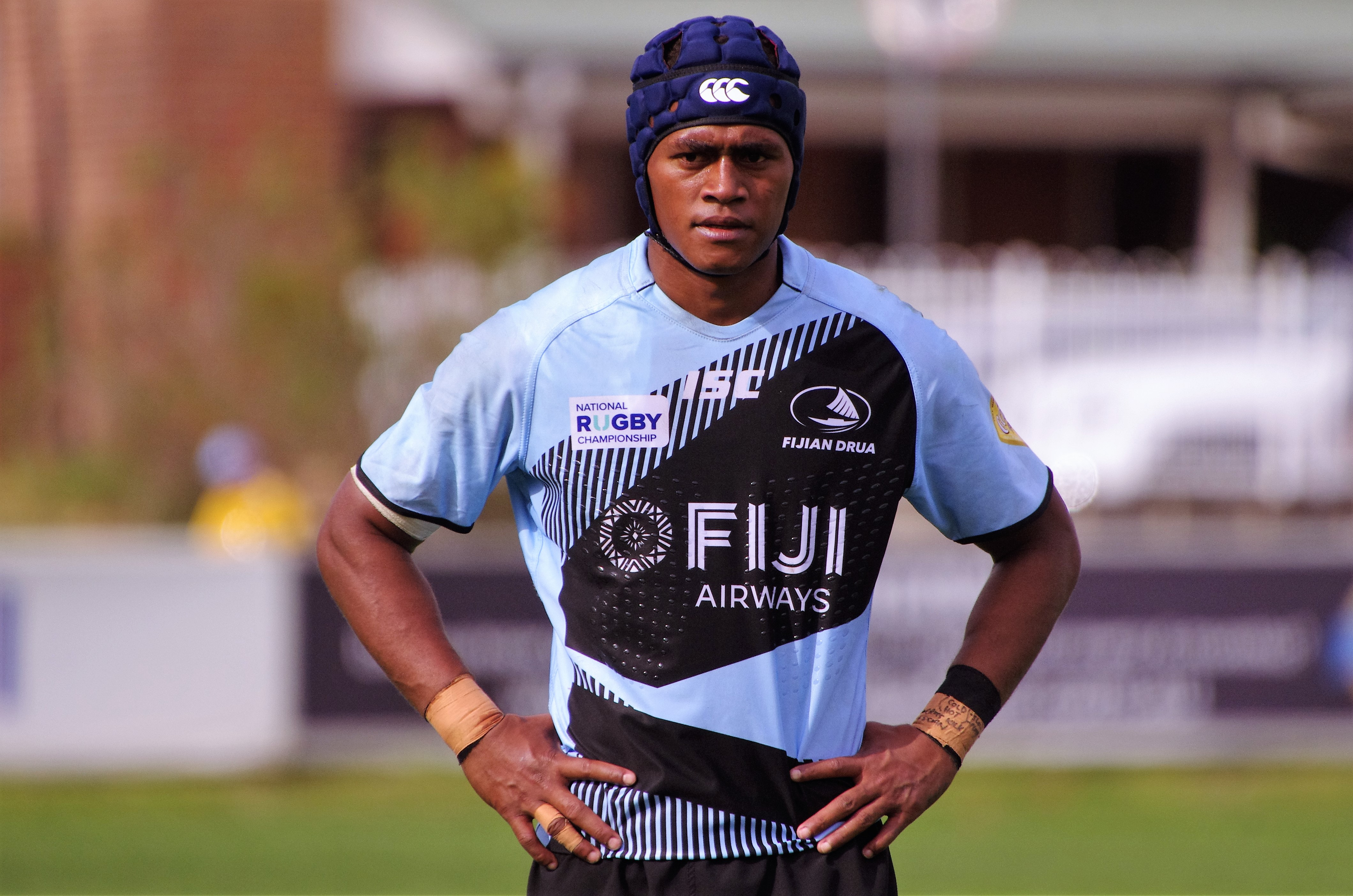
- Veitokani representing Fijian Drua in the National Rugby Championship, October 2017
- Born: 2 November 1992 (age 34) Tailevu, Fiji
- Height: 175 cm (5 ft 9 in)
- Weight: 85 kg (187 lb; 13 st 5 lb)
- School: Ratu Kadavulevu School

Rugby union career
- Position(s): Fullback, Fly-half
- Current team: Fijian Drua
Senior career
Years	Team	Apps	(Points)
2017–	Fijian Drua	11	(37)
2019–2020	London Irish	14	(25)
- Correct as of 10 February 2022
International career
Years	Team	Apps	(Points)
2016	Fiji Warriors	3	(35)
2018–2019	Fiji	12	(12)
- Correct as of 10 February 2022
National sevens team
Years	Team		Comps
2015–2017	Fiji		6
- Correct as of 10 February 2022

Alivereti Veitokani (born 2 November 1992) is a Fijian rugby union player. He previously played for the Fiji national rugby sevens team and the Fijian Drua in the Australian domestic National Rugby Championship where he won the 2018 Rising Star Award.

== Awards ==
- 2018 Fiji Sportsman of the Year Award
- 2018 NRC Rising Star Award
- Paddy Irish Man of the Match Award against Coventry
