= Suetena Asomua =

New Zealand rugby union player

- Born: 6 July 1998 (age 28) New Zealand
- Height: 197 cm (6 ft 6 in)
- Weight: 125 kg (276 lb; 19 st 10 lb)
- School: Wesley College

Rugby union career
- Position: Prop
Senior career
Years	Team	Apps	(Points)
2018–	Counties Manukau	14	(0)
- Correct as of 25 August 2021
Super Rugby
Years	Team	Apps	(Points)
2022	Moana Pasifika	1	(0)
International career
Years	Team	Apps	(Points)
2017	Samoa U20	5	(5)
2018	New Zealand U20	1	(0)
- Correct as of 29 June 2022

Suetena Asomua (born 6 July 1998) is a New Zealand rugby union player who plays for the Karaka club and Counties Manukau in the National Provincial Championship. His playing position is prop.

He made his Super Rugby debut for Moana Pasifika against the Blues on 29 March 2022.
