= Tau Koloamatangi =

New Zealand rugby union player

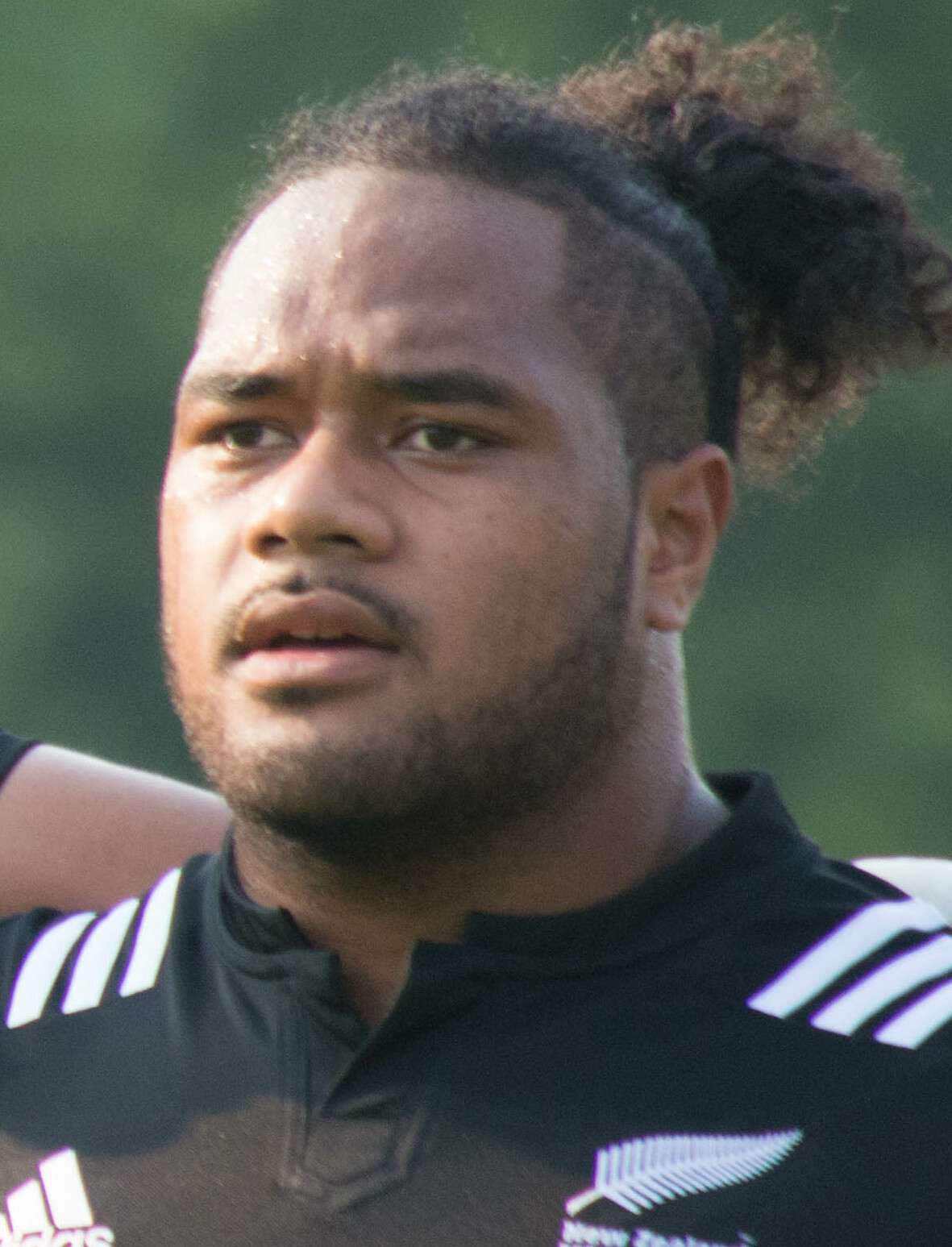
- Koloamatangi representing New Zealand during the World Rugby Under 20 Championship
- Full name: Taukiha'amea Koloamatangi
- Born: 3 January 1995 (age 31) Auckland, New Zealand
- Height: 1.72 m (5 ft 8 in)
- Weight: 128 kg (282 lb; 20 st 2 lb)
- School: Wesley College
- University: University of Waikato

Rugby union career
- Position: Prop
- Current team: Miami Sharks
Senior career
Years	Team	Apps	(Points)
2015–2016	Waikato	15	(5)
2021–2023	Otago	16	(5)
2022–2023	Moana Pasifika	15	(5)
2024–2025	Miami Sharks	17	(0)
- Correct as of 28 August 2023
International career
Years	Team	Apps	(Points)
2014–2015	New Zealand U20	11	(5)
2019	Hong Kong	1	(20)
2022–	Tonga	25	(0)
- Correct as of 28 August 2023

Taukiha'amea Koloamatangi (born 3 January 1995) is a professional rugby union player who played as a prop for Major League Rugby club Miami Sharks. Born in New Zealand, he represents Tonga at international level after qualifying on ancestry grounds.
