= Manu Paea =

New Zealand rugby union player

- Born: 17 September 2001 (age 25) Auckland, New Zealand
- Height: 1.75 m (5 ft 9 in)
- Weight: 85 kg (187 lb; 13 st 5 lb)
- School: Rotorua Boys' High School

Rugby union career
- Position: Scrum-half
- Current team: Moana Pasifika, Auckland
Senior career
Years	Team	Apps	(Points)
2022–2023	Moana Pasifika	12	(0)
2022–2023	Auckland	8	(0)
2025	North Harbour	3	(0)
- Correct as of 4 October 2025
International career
Years	Team	Apps	(Points)
2022–	Tonga	10	(0)
- Correct as of 28 August 2023

Manu Paea (born 17 September 2001) is a professional rugby union player who plays as a scrum-half for Super Rugby club Moana Pasifika. Born in New Zealand, he represents Tonga at international level after qualifying on ancestry grounds.

== Club career ==
He made his debut for Moana Pasifika in Round 6 of the 2022 Super Rugby Pacific season against the Hurricanes.

Paea was named in Tonga's 33-man squad for the 2023 Rugby World Cup, featuring in their 45-24 victory over Romania. After an injury-enforced absence from professional rugby in 2024, Paea signed with North Harbour for the 2025 Bunnings NPC.
