= Jonathan Taumateine =

Samoa international rugby union player

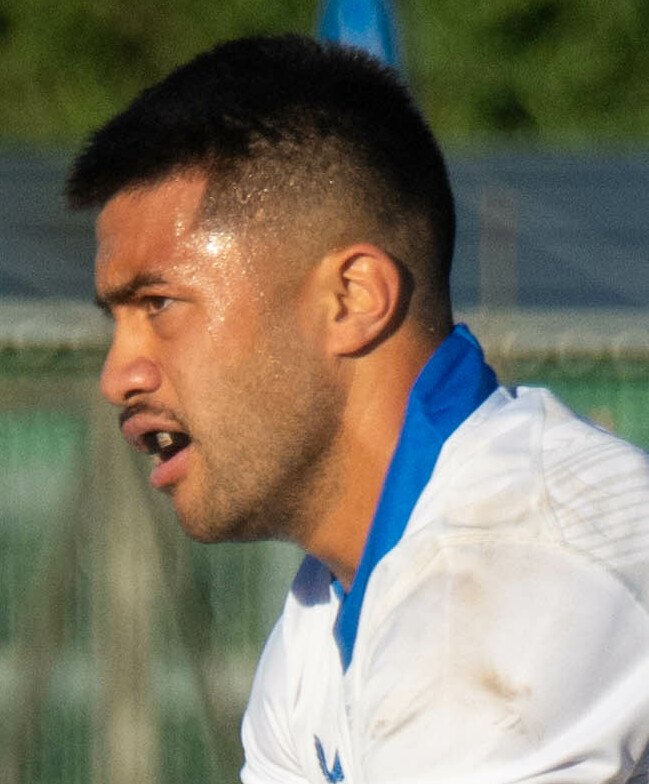
- Full name: Jonathan Archie Taumateine
- Born: 28 September 1996 (age 30) Auckland, New Zealand
- Height: 1.78 m (5 ft 10 in)
- Weight: 90 kg (198 lb; 14 st 2 lb)
- School: Wesley College

Rugby union career
- Position: Scrum-half
Senior career
Years	Team	Apps	(Points)
2016–2022	Counties Manukau	39	(10)
2017–2019	Chiefs	10	(0)
2020–2021	Hurricanes	9	(0)
2022–2026	Moana Pasifika	13	(0)
- Correct as of 28 August 2023
International career
Years	Team	Apps	(Points)
2015	Samoa U20	5	(0)
2016	New Zealand U20	6	(5)
2021–	Samoa	11	(15)
- Correct as of 28 August 2023

Jonathan Archie Taumateine (born 28 September 1996) is a professional rugby union player who played as a scrum-half for Super Rugby club Moana Pasifika. Born in New Zealand, he represents Samoa at international level after qualifying on ancestry grounds.

== Club career ==
Taumateine signed with the Moana Pasifika for the 2022 Super Rugby Pacific season. His position of choice is scrum-half.

== International career ==
In July 2021, he was named in the Samoa squad for the July internationals. Taumateine made his international debut for Samoa on 10 July in a 42–13 win over Tonga.
