= Penitoa Finau =

New Zealand rugby union player

- Born: 17 December 1993 (age 32) New Zealand
- Height: 185 cm (6 ft 1 in)
- Weight: 97 kg (214 lb; 15 st 4 lb)

Rugby union career
- Position: Flanker
- Current team: Bay of Plenty, Moana Pasifika
Senior career
| Years | Team | Apps | (Points) |
| 2021– | Bay of Plenty | 3 | (0) |
| 2022– | Moana Pasifika | | |
- Correct as of 22 November 2021

Penitoa Finau (born 17 December 1993) is a New Zealand rugby union player who plays for Moana Pasifika in Super Rugby. His playing position is flanker. He was named in the Moana Pasifika squad for the 2022 Super Rugby Pacific season. He also represented Bay of Plenty in the 2021 Bunnings NPC. He also represented Tonga at the 2023 Rugby World Cup, coming off the bench against Romania.
