= Sam Slade (rugby union) =

Samoan rugby union player

- Full name: Samuel Vinsene Slade
- Born: 28 August 1997 (age 29) Auckland, New Zealand
- Height: 1.95 m (6 ft 5 in)
- Weight: 118 kg (260 lb; 18 st 8 lb)
- School: Mount Albert Grammar School

Rugby union career
- Position(s): Lock, Flanker
- Current team: Secom Rugguts
Senior career
Years	Team	Apps	(Points)
2017	Auckland	6	(0)
2018	→ Manawatu (loan)	8	(0)
2019–2023	Counties Manukau	27	(10)
2020	Colorado Raptors	5	(0)
2022–2025	Moana Pasifika	20	(5)
2024	North Harbour	4	(5)
2025-	Secom Rugguts	16	(15)
- Correct as of 25 February 2025
International career
Years	Team	Apps	(Points)
2017	New Zealand U20	6	(5)
2021–	Samoa	4	(0)
- Correct as of 28 August 2023

Samuel Vinsene Slade (born 28 August 1997) is a professional rugby union player who plays as a lock for Super Rugby club Moana Pasifika. Born in New Zealand, he represents Samoa at international level after qualifying on ancestry grounds.

== Club career ==
Slade made his provincial debut for Auckland in 2017 and played 6 games and made the New Zealand Under 20's from that. In 2018 Samuel went on loan to Manawatu and played 8 times for the Province before going back up north in 2019 to Counties Manukau and since then has made 16 appearances for the union.

In 2019 he was recruited to the Colorado Raptors for the 2020 season.

He has signed with Moana Pasifika for the 2022 Super Rugby Pacific season.

== International career ==
In 2021 Slade was selected for the Samoan national team to play 2 tests against the Maori All Black's and 2 against Tonga to qualify for the 2023 Rugby World Cup.
