= Philip Baselala =

Fijian rugby union player (born 2004)

Philip Daniel Blade Baselala
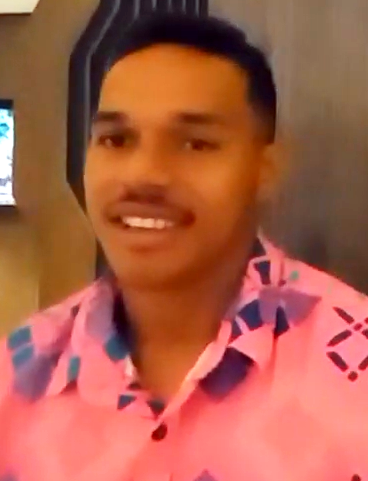
- Born: 14 September 2004 (age 22) Fiji
- Height: 179 cm (5 ft 10 in)
- Weight: 85 kg (187 lb; 13 st 5 lb)
- School: Suva Grammar School

Rugby union career
- Position: Scrum-half
- Current team: Drua
Senior career
Years	Team	Apps	(Points)
2023-	Drua	2	(0)
- Correct as of 18 August 2023
International career
Years	Team	Apps	(Points)
2023– 2025–	Fiji U20 Flying Fijians	5 3	(0)
- Correct as of 18 August 2023

Philip Baselala (born 14 September 2004) is a Fijian rugby union player, who plays for the Drua in Super Rugby and the Flying Fijian in International Rugby. His preferred position is scrum-half.

== Early career ==
Baselala began playing rugby at the age of eight, and attended Suva Grammar School.

== Professional career ==
Baselala was named in the Drua development squad ahead of the 2023 Super Rugby Pacific season, before being called into the full squad in January 2023. He made his debut in Round 6 of the season, debuting against the Rebels. He was named in the Fiji U20s squad following the Super Rugby campaign.Later in 2025 he was called into the Flying Fijians and made his debut against the Wallabies in 2025.
