= Veikoso Poloniati =

New Zealand rugby union player

- Full name: Veikoso James Poloniati
- Born: 27 August 1995 (age 31) New Zealand
- Height: 203 cm (6 ft 8 in)
- Weight: 130 kg (287 lb; 20 st 7 lb)

Rugby union career
- Position: Lock
- Current team: Manawatu
Senior career
Years	Team	Apps	(Points)
2021–	Manawatu	13	(5)
2022–2026	Moana Pasifika		
- Correct as of 22 November 2021
International career
Years	Team	Apps	(Points)
2021–	Tonga	7	(10)

Veikoso Poloniati (born 27 August 1995) is a New Zealand-born Tonga rugby union player who played for Moana Pasifika in Super Rugby. His playing position is lock. He was named in the Moana Pasifika squad for the 2022 Super Rugby Pacific season. He also represented Manawatu in the 2021 Bunnings NPC.
