= Joe Apikotoa =

New Zealand rugby union player (born 1996)

Joe 'Apikotoa
- Full name: Sosefo Losino 'Apikotoa
- Born: 18 July 1996 (age 30) Wellington, New Zealand
- Height: 1.91 m (6 ft 3 in)
- Weight: 120 kg (265 lb; 18 st 13 lb)
- School: St Patrick's College, Silverstream

Rugby union career
- Position: Prop
- Current team: Hawke's Bay
Senior career
Years	Team	Apps	(Points)
2015–2017	Wellington	22	(0)
2018	Hawke's Bay	11	(5)
2019–2020	Ordizia RE	9	(10)
2020–	Hawke's Bay	52	(10)
2021	Chiefs	5	(0)
2022–2023	Moana Pasifika	16	(10)
2024–2025	Anthem Rugby Carolina	18	(22)
- Correct as of 19 November 2026
International career
Years	Team	Apps	(Points)
2022–	Tonga	6	(0)
- Correct as of 3 October 2023

Sosefo Losino 'Apikotoa (born 18 July 1996) is a rugby union player, who currently plays as a prop for Hawke's Bay in New Zealand's domestic National Provincial Championship competition.

He previously played for Moana Pasifika in Super Rugby and for Anthem Rugby Carolina in Major League Rugby (MLR).

He was born and raised in New Zealand, but represents Tonga internationally, for which he is eligible due to his Tongan descent.

== Early career ==
'Apikotoa was born in Wellington and attended St Patrick's College, Silverstream, where he played both rugby and league.

=== Rugby ===
He played for his school's 1st XV team in the Wellington Premiership 1st XV competition in 2012, 2013 and 2014.

After his return from a brief league stint in Australia (see below), 'Apikotoa played for Hutt Old Boys-Marist in the Wellington Premier club rugby competition.

He was part of the Wellington U19 team that finished fifth at the Jock Hobbs Memorial National U19 tournament in 2015.

=== League ===
In 2012 and 2013, 'Apikotoa played for the Wellington Orcas U17 team. He was named the Wellington Orcas 17s Player of the Year and Junior Player of the Year in 2013. A year later, he played for the premier Wellington Orcas squad.

While still at school, he signed a 2-year contract with Melbourne Storm (starting in November 2014), but in December 2014 he already returned home to New Zealand and from then on focused on playing rugby.

== Senior career ==
While he was not named in the Wellington Lions squad for the 2015 ITM Cup season, 'Apikotoa played 5 games off the bench for them that year. He made his Wellington debut on 15 August 2015 against Taranaki. 'Apikotoa was named in the Wellington Lions squad in 2016 and 2017 and played 22 games for the province.

In 2017, 'Apikotoa was selected in the Hurricanes squad for the inaugural Brisbane Global Rugby Tens.

In search for more game time, he moved to Hawke's Bay the following year and was named in the Magpies squad for the 2018 Mitre 10 Cup season. He played 11 games for the province, that year.

In 2019, 'Apikotoa played a preseason game for the Highlanders, but it didn't result in a further call-up by the franchise.

Later that year, 'Apikotoa had a brief stint in Spain, where he played 9 games for the Basque club Ordizia RE that competes in the Spanish División de Honor de Rugby. He returned home before the end of their season, to look for playing opportunities in New Zealand.

He went back to Hawke's Bay and was named in the Magpies squad for the 2020 Mitre 10 Cup season. During that season, the Magpies won the Ranfurly Shield (taking it off Otago), were successful in three more Ranfurly Shield defences (against Northland, Manawatu and Wellington), and won the Mitre 10 Cup Championship, thus securing a well-deserved promotion to the Premiership division. The Magpies held on to the Shield during the entire 2021 Bunnings NPC season, winning all six Ranfurly Shield defences.

After a successful 2020 season with the Magpies, while not named in the initial Chiefs' squad for the 2021 Super Rugby season, 'Apikotoa was signed by the franchise as an injury replacement. He made his Super Rugby debut for the Chiefs on 20 March 2021 against the Hurricanes and played 5 games for the side, that year.

On 9 November 2021, Moana Pasifika announced that the new franchise had signed 'Apikotoa for the 2022 Super Rugby Pacific season. On 4 March 2022, he made his debut for the new franchise – off the bench – in their inaugural Super Rugby game against the Crusaders. He scored his first Super Rugby try in Moana Pasifika's second game of the season, against the Chiefs, on 19 March 2022. He played two seasons for the franchise.

On 2 February 2024, 'Apikotoa was named in the Anthem Rugby Carolina squad for the 2024 Major League Rugby season. He made his debut for the club on 5 April 2024 in their round 6 game against Utah Warriors. He played 18 games during the two seasons he was part of the club.

== International career ==
=== Rugby ===
'Apikotoa was invited to attend a New Zealand U20 Development Camp in November 2015 and an U20 trial camp in March 2016, but wasn't named in the New Zealand Under-20 squad for the 2016 Oceania Rugby Under 20 Championship and the 2016 World Rugby Under 20 Championship.

On 27 May 2022, 'Apikotoa – who is of Tongan descent – was named in the Tongan national team for the 2022 Pacific Nations Cup and the Asia/Pacific qualification match for the 2023 Rugby World Cup. He made his international test debut for Tonga on 2 July 2022 against Fiji.

=== League ===
In 2013, 'Apikotoa played for the New Zealand Residents U18 team that played two tests against Australian Secondary Schools XIII. A year later, he was selected again and played two tests against the New South Wales-based Taurahere Kiwis.
