= Niko Jones =

New Zealand rugby union player (born 2000)

- Born: 22 July 2000 (age 26) New Zealand
- Height: 186 cm (6 ft 1 in)
- Weight: 103 kg (227 lb; 16 st 3 lb)
- School: St Peter's College
- Notable relative(s): Michael Jones (Father); KJ Apa (cousin)

Rugby union career
- Position(s): Flanker, Number 8
- Current team: Auckland, Old Glory DC
Senior career
Years	Team	Apps	(Points)
2020–	Auckland	16	(10)
2022–2023	Moana Pasifika	2	(0)
2023–	Old Glory DC	8	(0)
- Correct as of 31 January 2024

Niko Jones (born 22 July 2000) is a New Zealand rugby union player who plays as a flanker for Auckland in New Zealand's domestic National Provincial Championship competition and Old Glory DC in Major League Rugby (MLR).

Jones, the son of former All Black Michael Jones, was educated at St Peter's College, Auckland. He played for the school's 1st XV team that won the National Top 4 title in 2018.

Jones was, for the first time, named in the Auckland squad for the 2020 Mitre 10 Cup season. He made his debut for the province on 10 October 2020 against Taranaki.

In 2022, Jones took up a contract to play for Old Glory DC in Major League Rugby (MLR) in the United States.
