= Mahonri Ngakuru =

New Zealand rugby union player

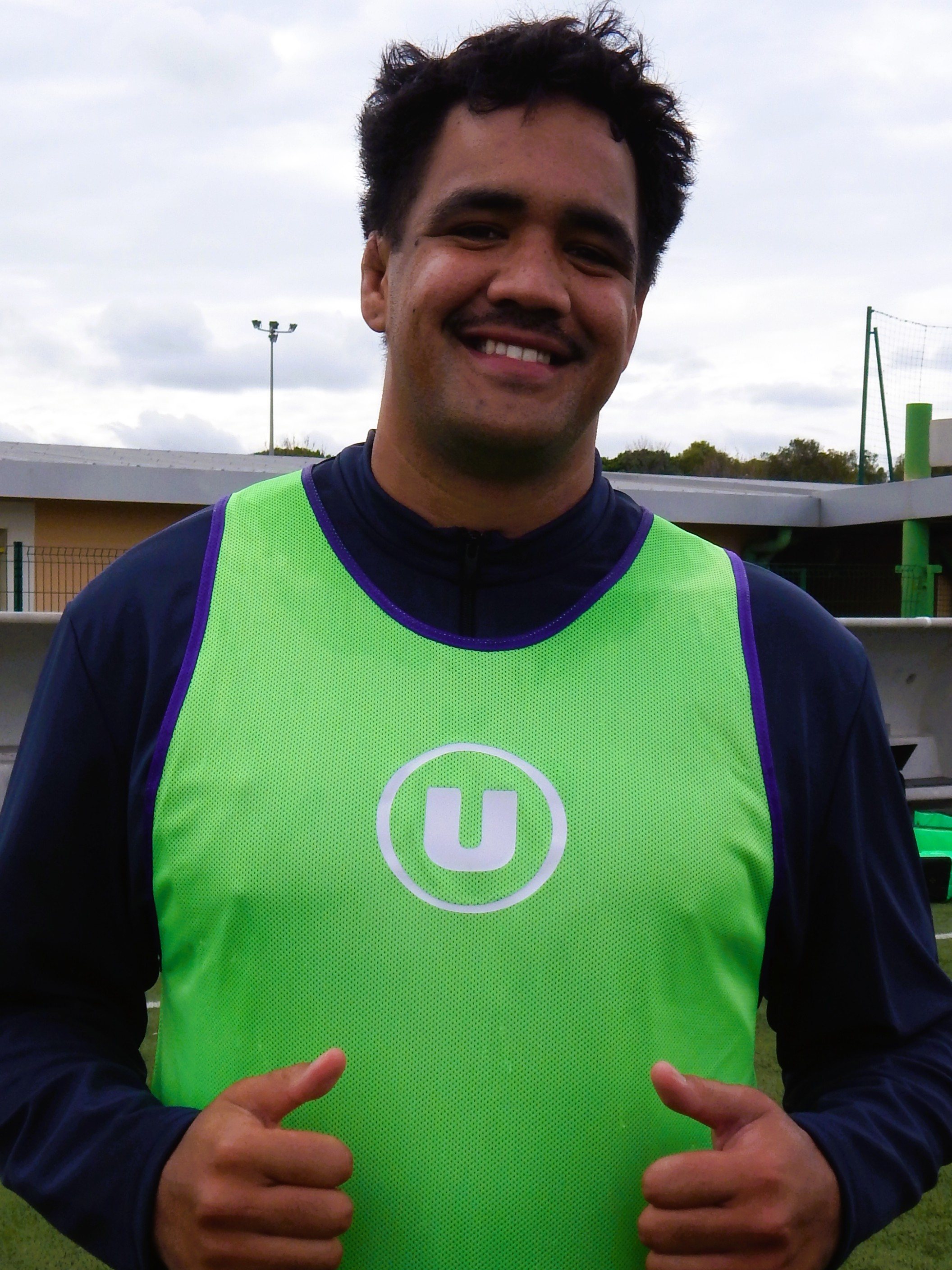
- Born: 2 January 2000 (age 26) New Zealand
- Height: 202 cm (6 ft 8 in)
- Weight: 119 kg (262 lb; 18 st 10 lb)
- School: Saint Kentigern College

Rugby union career
- Position: Lock
- Current team: Kamaishi Seawaves
Senior career
Years	Team	Apps	(Points)
2020–2022	Tasman	13	(0)
2022–2023	Moana Pasifika	10	(0)
2023–2025	North Harbour	19	(0)
2024–2026	Seattle Seawolves	9	(10)
2026–	Kamaishi Seawaves		
- Correct as of 11 December 2024
International career
Years	Team	Apps	(Points)
2026–	Tonga	3	(0)

Mahonri Ngakuru (born 2 January 2000) is a New Zealand rugby union player, who currently plays for Montpellier in the French Top 14. He previously played for Seattle Seawolves in Major League Rugby and plays for North Harbour in the National Provincial Championship. His preferred position is lock.

== Early career ==
Ngakuru attended Saint Kentigern College, where his performances earned him selection for NZ Schools. He was a member of the Crusaders development team and named in a New Zealand U20 development camp. He is of Maori and Tongan heritage.

== Professional career ==
Ngakuru made his professional debut for Tasman in the 2020 Mitre 10 Cup. He represented the team again in 2021 and 2022 before transferring to North Harbour in 2023 being named in both the 2023 and 2024 squads. Ngakuru was named in the Moana Pasifika squad ahead of the 2022 Super Rugby Pacific season, and was again named in the side for the 2023 season, making ten total appearances across the two seasons. He departed the side at the end of the 2023 season ahead of joining the Seattle Seawolves for the 2024 Major League Rugby season.
