= Don Lolo =

Tongan rugby union player

- Born: 21 July 1994 (age 32) Tonga
- Height: 198 cm (6 ft 6 in)
- Weight: 110 kg (243 lb; 17 st 5 lb)
- School: Waitaki Boys’ High School

Rugby union career
- Position: Lock
Senior career
Years	Team	Apps	(Points)
2022–	Moana Pasifika	0	(0)
- Correct as of 22 November 2022
International career
Years	Team	Apps	(Points)
2021–	Tonga	3	(0)
- Correct as of 22 November 2021

Don Lolo (born 21 July 1994) is a Tongan rugby union player who plays for Moana Pasifika for the 2022 Super Rugby Pacific season. His playing position is lock. He is a Tongan international, making his debut in 2021 against New Zealand.
