= Viliame Rarasea =

- Born: 1 April 1993 (age 33) Kadavu, Fiji
- Height: 196 cm (6 ft 5 in)
- Weight: 140 kg (309 lb; 22 st 1 lb)
- School: Sacred Heart College

Rugby union career
- Position: Lock
Senior career
Years	Team	Apps	(Points)
2013–2022	Counties Manukau	57	(15)
2019	Kobelco Steelers	4	(5)
2022	Fijian Drua	9	(0)
- Correct as of 10 February 2022
International career
Years	Team	Apps	(Points)
2013	Fiji U20	3	(5)
2018	Fiji Warriors	3	(0)
- Correct as of 10 February 2022

Viliame Rarasea (born 1 April 1993) is a Fijian rugby union player who currently plays as a lock for Counties Manukau in New Zealand's domestic Mitre 10 Cup.

== Senior career ==
Rarasea made his senior debut for the Counties Manukau Steelers during the 2013 ITM Cup, however that was to be his only appearance during the campaign. He played six times off the replacements bench the following year before establishing himself as more of a regular in 2015 and then making a career high 10 starting appearances in 2016.

== International ==
Rarasea was a member of the Fiji Under 20 side which competed in the 2013 IRB Junior World Championship in France, making 3 appearances and scoring 1 try.
