= Jone Koroiduadua =

Fijian rugby union player (born 1999)

- Born: 10 March 1997 (age 29) Nadroga-Navosa, Fiji
- Height: 182 cm (6 ft 0 in)
- Weight: 114 kg (251 lb; 17 st 13 lb)
- School: Sigatoka Valley High School

Rugby union career
- Position: Prop
- Current team: Fijian Drua
Senior career
Years	Team	Apps	(Points)
2019–	Fijian Drua	20	(0)
2025-	New England Free Jacks	14	(5)
- Correct as of 8 july 2025
International career
Years	Team	Apps	(Points)
2024-	Fiji	5	(0)

Jone Koroiduadua (born 10 March 1999) is a Fijian rugby union player, currently playing for the Drua. His preferred position is prop. He has also played for the Fiji national team.

== Professional career ==
Koroiduadua was named in the Fijian Drua squad for the 2022 Super Rugby Pacific season. He had previously represented the Drua in the 2019 National Rugby Championship.

He signed with the New England free jacks in 2025 winning the 2025 MLR championship. Making 14 appearances and scoring 1 try.

International career

He made his debut for the Fiji national team in 2024 in the summer nation series vs France.

== Personal life ==
Koroiduadua is a Former Police Constable.
