= Kalaveti Ravouvou =

Fijian rugby union player (born 1998)

- Born: 6 June 1998 (age 28) Nadroga-Navosa, Fiji
- Height: 186 cm (6 ft 1 in)
- Weight: 94 kg (207 lb; 14 st 11 lb)
- School: Cuvu College
- Notable relative(s): Waisake Naholo (cousin); Kini Naholo (cousin)

Rugby union career
- Position(s): Centre, Wing
- Current team: Bristol Bears
Senior career
Years	Team	Apps	(Points)
2022–2023	Fijian Drua	26	(30)
2023–	Bristol Bears	31	(70)
- Correct as of 15 September 2025
International career
Years	Team	Apps	(Points)
2022–	Fiji	12	(40)

Kalaveti Ravouvou (born 6 June 1998) is a Fijian rugby union player, currently playing for the Bristol Bears. His preferred position is Centre, but is also comfortable on the Wing.

== Professional career ==
Ravouvou was named in the Fijian Drua squad for the 2022 Super Rugby Pacific season. He made his debut for the Drua in Round 1 of the 2022 Super Rugby Pacific season against the Waratahs.

Ravouvou was selected to be a member of the 2023 Rugby World Cup squad for Fiji, playing in the victory against England at Twickenham in the warm up matches.

He joined Bristol Bears for the beginning of the 2023-24 Premiership Rugby season, replacing the departing, and international teammate Semi Radradra.. On 25 October 2024, Ravouvou returned from injury to make his first appearance of the season, scoring two tries vs Northampton at Ashton Gate.
