= Manasa Saulo =

Fiji international rugby union player

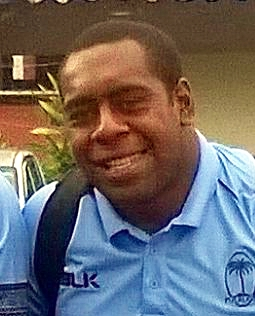
- Saulo representing Fiji post Italy match, June 2014
- Full name: Ratu Manasa Saulo Romumu
- Born: 6 April 1989 (age 37) Naitasiri, Fiji
- Height: 182 cm (6 ft 0 in)
- Weight: 132 kg (291 lb; 20 st 11 lb)
- School: Ratu Sukuna Memorial School

Rugby union career
- Position: Prop
- Current team: Fijian Drua
Senior career
Years	Team	Apps	(Points)
2014–2015	Timișoara	11	(5)
2016–2017	Toulon	22	(0)
2017–2019	London Irish	3	(0)
2021	Rugby ATL	11	(0)
2022–	Fijian Drua	8	(0)
- Correct as of 10 February 2022
International career
Years	Team	Apps	(Points)
2008–2009	Fiji U20	10	(0)
2012–2019	Fiji	47	(0)
- Correct as of 10 February 2022

Manasa Saulo (born 6 April 1989) is a Fijian professional rugby union football player. Saulo was selected to the Fijian national squad for the first time 2012 and has gone on to play in two Rugby World Cups. Saulo plays at tighthead prop currently for Major League Rugby side Rugby ATL having previously played for London Irish, RC Toulounnais and Timisoara Saracens.
