= Kalione Nasoko =

Fiji rugby sevens player (b. 1990)

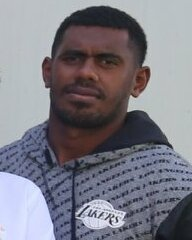
- Nasoko in 2018
- Born: 2 December 1990 (age 35) Waya, Fiji
- Height: 189 cm (6 ft 2 in)
- Weight: 101 kg (223 lb; 15 st 13 lb)
- School: Nadi Muslim College

Rugby union career
- Position: Centre
- Current team: Fijian Drua
Senior career
Years	Team	Apps	(Points)
2022–	Fijian Drua	0	(0)
- Correct as of 10 February 2022
National sevens team
Years	Team		Comps
2016–2021	Fiji		29
- Correct as of 10 February 2022
Medal record
Men's rugby sevens
Representing Fiji
Summer Olympics
Gold medal – first place	2020 Tokyo	Team competition
Commonwealth Games
Silver medal – second place	2018 Gold Coast	Team competition

Kalione Nasoko MOF (born 2 December 1990) is the current captain of the Fiji national rugby sevens team to the 2018 Oceania Sevens Championship and the 2018 Dubai Sevens. Nasoko was awarded player of the final at the 2017 Hong Kong Sevens Tournament where Fiji beat the South Africa Sevens Team 22–0. Nasoko made his debut for Fiji at the 2016 Dubai Sevens.

== Early life ==
Nasoko grew up on the Island of Yawa Levu, an island formed on a volcanic ridge at the southern tip of the Yasawa group of Islands in Fiji. Nasoko's early education was at Ratu Naivalu Memorial School, the only school on Waya Island, a two-hour trek along mountainous terrain.

== Awards and honours ==
- A Part of 2017-18 Hamilton 7s Winning Team (Gold Medalist)
- A Part of 2017-18 Vancouver 7s Winning Team (Gold Medalist)
- A Part of 2017-18 Singapore 7s Winning Team (Gold Medalist)
- A Part of 2017-18 Hong Kong 7s Winning Team (Gold Medalist)
- A Part of 2017-18 London 7s Winning Team (Gold Medalist)
- Player of the Final 2017 Hong Kong Sevens
- 2016-17 HSBC World Series Dream Team
- 2017-18 HSBC World Series Dream Team
- 2017-18 Commonwealth Silver Medalist
- 2018 Medal of the Order of Fiji
