= Kitione Ratu =

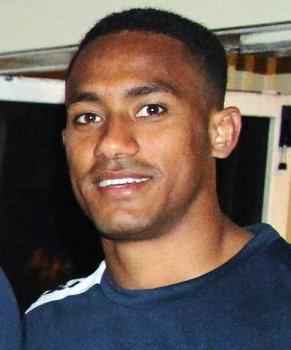
- Ratu at Ratu Cakobau Park in Nausori, September 2018
- Born: 13 December 1994 (age 31) Tailevu, Fiji
- Height: 194 cm (6 ft 4 in)
- Weight: 85 kg (187 lb; 13 st 5 lb)
- School: Tavua College

Rugby union career
- Position: Wing
- Current team: Fijian Drua
Senior career
Years	Team	Apps	(Points)
2017–2018	Melbourne Rising	13	(30)
2019	Eastwood	16	(50)
2019	Western Force	1	(0)
2022–	Fijian Drua	0	(0)
- Correct as of 10 February 2022
International career
Years	Team	Apps	(Points)
2016	Fiji Warriors	3	(14)
- Correct as of 10 February 2022

Kitione Ratu (born 13 December 1994) is a Fiji-born Australian rugby union player who plays for the Rebels in the Super Rugby competition. His position of choice is wing.

== Super Rugby statistics ==
As of 15 July 2018

Season	Team	Games	Starts	Sub	Mins	Tries	Cons	Pens	Drops	Points	Yel	Red
2018	Rebels	0	0	0	0	0	0	0	0	0	0	0
Total		0	0	0	0	0	0	0	0	0	0	0
