= Kaliopasi Uluilakepa =

New Zealand rugby union player

- Born: 18 January 1999 (age 27) Auckland, New Zealand
- Height: 190 cm (6 ft 3 in)
- Weight: 138 kg (304 lb; 21 st 10 lb)
- School: Marist Brothers High School

Rugby union career
- Position: Prop
Senior career
| Years | Team | Apps | (Points) |
| 2018–2020 | Wellington | 17 | (10) |
| 2021 | Northland | 7 | (15) |
| 2022–2023 | Fijian Drua | 11 | (0) |
- Correct as of 1 April 2023
International career
| Years | Team | Apps | (Points) |
| 2018–2019 | New Zealand U20 | 14 | (5) |
| – | Fiji U18s | | |
- Correct as of 1 April 2023

Kaliopasi Uluilakepa (born 21 January 1999) is a New Zealand born Fijian rugby union player. His position is prop.
