= Leone Nawai =

Fijian rugby union player (born 1995)

- Born: 15 August 1995 (age 31) Fiji
- Height: 174 cm (5 ft 9 in)
- Weight: 82 kg (181 lb; 12 st 13 lb)

Rugby union career
- Position: Scrum-half
- Current team: Fijian Drua
Senior career
Years	Team	Apps	(Points)
2022–	Fijian Drua	1	(0)
- Correct as of 23 April 2022
International career
Years	Team	Apps	(Points)
2014–2015	Fiji U20	7	(0)
- Correct as of 23 April 2022

Leone Nawai (born 15 August 1995) is a Fijian rugby union player, currently playing for the Taranaki in New Zealand. He was named in the Chiefs squad for the 2025 Super Rugby Pacific. His preferred position is scrum-half.

In 2014, he attended Ratu Kadavulevu School and played for their first fifteen. In 2015, he was named for Fiji U20's for the Junior World Championship in 2015.

Played 4 seasons for Suva in the Skipper Cup in Fiji and was one of their key players before he was rewarded with a contract with the Drua in their inaugural season in 2022.

== Professional career ==
Nawai was named in the Fijian Drua squad for the 2022 Super Rugby Pacific season. He made his debut for the Drua in Round 10 of the 2022 Super Rugby Pacific season against the Blues.

Ultimately he couldn't get enough gametime with the Drua in Super Rugby with incumbent Frank Lomani, Simi Kuruvoli and Peni Matawalu, the preferred options.

Nawai moved to NZ and signed with Taranaki Bulls in the Bunnings Warehouse NPC. He has been selected for the Chiefs squad for the 2025 season.
