= Joseva Tamani =

Fijian rugby union player (born 1997)

- Born: 2 April 1997 (age 29) Levuka, Fiji
- Height: 195 cm (6 ft 5 in)
- Weight: 108 kg (238 lb; 17 st 0 lb)
- School: Delana Methodist High School

Rugby union career
- Position(s): Flanker, Lock
- Current team: Fijian Drua
Senior career
Years	Team	Apps	(Points)
2019	Melbourne Rising	2	(0)
2021	Wildfires	6	(20)
2022–	Fijian Drua	31	(30)
2023-24	Colomiers Rugby	15	(15)
2025	Otago	8	(10)
- Correct as of 10 February 2022
International career
Years	Team	Apps	(Points)
2023	Fiji	2	(0)

Joseva Tamani (born 2 April 1997) is a Fijian rugby union player, currently playing for Fijian Drua.

He is a very agile and fast loose forward, known for picking up any loose ball in general play and striding away to the tryline.

== Professional career ==
Tamani was previously in the Fijian Drua squad for the 2022 Super Rugby Pacific season. He had previously represented the Melbourne Rising in the 2019 National Rugby Championship.

Impressive performances for the Drua in 2023 made him top scoring forward and earned him selection for the Flying Fijians team by Simon Raiwalui for the Pacific Nations Cup where he made his test debut against Samoa.
