= Jone Tiko =

Fijian rugby union player (born 1994)

- Born: 16 October 1994 (age 32) Fiji
- Height: 180 cm (5 ft 11 in)
- Weight: 120 kg (18 st 13 lb; 260 lb)

Rugby union career
- Position: Prop
- Current team: Southland
Senior career
| Years | Team | Apps | (Points) |
| 2022–2023 | Fijian Drua | 7 | (0) |
| 2024 | Tasman | 2 | (0) |
- Correct as of 13 October 2024

Jone Tiko (born 16 October 1994) is a Fijian rugby union player, currently playing for Southland in the Bunnings NPC. His position is prop.

== Professional career ==
Tiko was named in the Fijian Drua squad for Round 8 of the 2022 Super Rugby Pacific season. He made his debut for the Drua in the same match against the Brumbies.
