= Kitione Salawa (rugby union, born 2001) =

Fijian rugby union player (born 2001)

Kitione Salawa Jr.
- Born: 23 May 2001 (age 25) Nadi, Fiji
- Height: 192 cm (6 ft 4 in)
- Weight: 99 kg (218 lb; 15 st 8 lb)
- School: Ratu Navula College
- Notable relative: Kitione Salawa (father)

Rugby union career
- Position: Flanker
- Current team: Fijian Drua
Senior career
Years	Team	Apps	(Points)
2022–	Fijian Drua	48	(20)
- Correct as of 5 May 2026
International career
Years	Team	Apps	(Points)
2020	Fiji Warriors	3	(5)
2024	Fiji	13	(20)
- Correct as of 5 May 2026

Kitione Salawa Jr. (born 23 May 2001) is a Fijian rugby union player, currently playing for the Drua. His preferred position is lock.

== Professional career ==
Salawa was named in the Fijian Drua squad for the 2022 Super Rugby Pacific season. He made his debut for the Drua in Round 1 of the 2022 Super Rugby Pacific season against the Waratahs.
