= Vilive Miramira =

Fijian rugby union player (born 1999)

- Born: 21 March 1999 (age 27) Vanua Levu, Fiji
- Height: 193 cm (6 ft 4 in)
- Weight: 97 kg (214 lb; 15 st 4 lb)
- School: Votualevu College

Rugby union career
- Position: Flanker
- Current team: Fijian Drua
Senior career
Years	Team	Apps	(Points)
2022–	Fijian Drua	8	(5)
- Correct as of 10 February 2022
International career
Years	Team	Apps	(Points)
2019	Fiji U20	3	(0)
2020	Fiji Warriors	3	(0)
- Correct as of 10 February 2022

Vilive Miramira (born 21 March 1999) is a Fijian rugby union player, currently playing for the Drua. His preferred position is flanker.

== Professional career ==
Miramira was named in the Fijian Drua squad for the 2022 Super Rugby Pacific season. He made his debut for the Drua in Round 1 of the 2022 Super Rugby Pacific season against the Waratahs.
