= Caleb Muntz =

Fiji international rugby union player

- Born: 30 October 1999 (age 27) Huntly, New Zealand
- Height: 175 cm (5 ft 9 in)
- Weight: 87 kg (192 lb; 13 st 10 lb)
- School: Hamilton Boys' High School

Rugby union career
- Position(s): Fly-half, Fullback
- Current team: Fijian Drua
Senior career
Years	Team	Apps	(Points)
2019–2025	Fijian Drua	25	(48)
2025–	Provence		
- Correct as of 4 June 2025
International career
Years	Team	Apps	(Points)
2018–2019	Fiji U20	8	(49)
2019	Fiji Warriors	3	(16)
2023–	Fiji	14	(133)
- Correct as of 4 June 2025

Caleb Muntz (born 30 October 1999) is a rugby union player, currently playing for the Drua in Super Rugby Pacific and the Fiji national men's team. His preferred position is fly-half or fullback. He was born in New Zealand, and qualified to play for Fiji through his grandparents.

He was part of the Fijian Under 20 team in 2018 and 2019, played an unofficial game for Fiji against the Barbarians in 2019, before making his official debut for the senior team in 2023. He signed for Pro D2 side Provence Rugby after the conclusion of the 2025 Super Rugby Pacific season

== Early life ==
Caleb Muntz was born in Huntly, New Zealand to a Maori mother and a father of Fijian and European descent. He began playing rugby at the age of four in nearby Hamilton, where he grew up, and later represented Hamilton Boys' High School. He qualifies to play for Fiji through his paternal grandmother, who is from Savusavu and paternal grandfather, who is from Rewa.

== Club career ==
Muntz was named in the Fijian Drua squad for the 2022 Super Rugby Pacific season. He had previously represented the Drua in the 2019 National Rugby Championship.

== International career ==
Muntz was named in the Fijian training squad for the 2023 Rugby World Cup. He later made his debut for Fiji against Tonga in Lautoka on 22 July 2023, scoring 9 points (1 penalty, 3 conversions). On 8 August 2023, he was named in the final group of 33 players selected by Simon Raiwalui to participate in the World Cup in France. Shortly thereafter, in only his fourth match, Muntz was part of the Fijian team that beat England for the very first time on 26 August 2023 at Twickenham. He started at flyhalf and scoring three penalties and three conversions.

In November 2024, Muntz scored a try, a conversion and four penalties in Fiji's 24–19 win over Wales in the 2024 Autumn Nations Series. This was Fiji's first ever win over Wales at the Millennium Stadium.
