= Raikabula Momoedonu =

Fijian rugby union player (born 1998)

- Born: 28 March 1998 (age 28) Lautoka, Fiji
- Height: 190 cm (6 ft 3 in)
- Weight: 107 kg (236 lb; 16 st 12 lb)
- School: Queen Victoria School

Rugby union career
- Position(s): Flanker, Lock
Senior career
Years	Team	Apps	(Points)
2019	Fijian Latui	4	(0)
2021	Northland	3	(5)
2022–2023	Fijian Drua	2	(0)
- Correct as of 20 May 2022
International career
Years	Team	Apps	(Points)
2017–2018	Fiji U20	7	(0)
2019	Fiji Warriors	2	(0)
- Correct as of 20 May 2022

Raikabula Momoedonu (born 28 March 1998) is a Fijian rugby union player. His position is flanker.

== Professional career ==
Momoedonu was named in the Fijian Drua squad for the 2022 Super Rugby Pacific season. He also represented Northland in the 2021 Bunnings NPC.
