= Isoa Nasilasila =

Fijian rugby union player (born 1999)

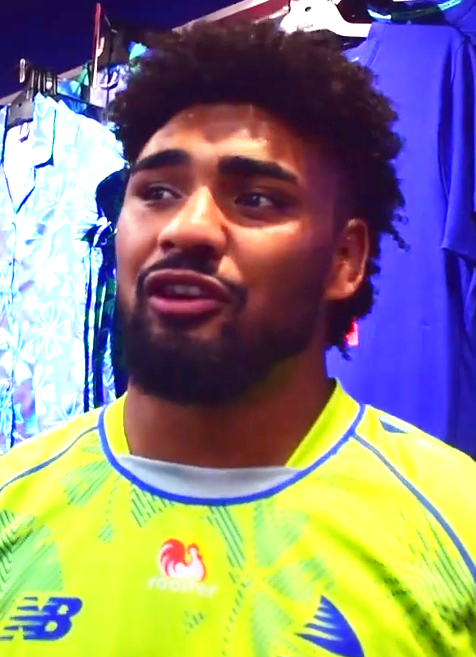
- Born: 13 September 1999 (age 27) Campbelltown, Sydney, Australia
- Height: 198 cm (6 ft 6 in)
- Weight: 137 kg (302 lb; 21 st 8 lb)
- School: Westfields Sports High School

Rugby union career
- Position(s): Lock, Flanker
- Current team: JR East Green Warriors
Senior career
Years	Team	Apps	(Points)
2020–2025	Southern Districts	14	(15)
2022–2026	Fijian Drua	59	(10)
2026–	JR East Green Warriors		
- Correct as of 10 February 2022
International career
Years	Team	Apps	(Points)
2020	Fiji Warriors	3	(0)
2021–	Fiji	34	(0)
- Correct as of 10 February 2022

Isoa Nasilasila (born 13 September 1999) is a Fijian rugby union player, currently playing for the Drua. His preferred position is lock.

== Professional career ==
Nasilasila was named in the Fijian Drua squad for the 2022 Super Rugby Pacific season. He made his debut for the Drua in Round 1 of the 2022 Super Rugby Pacific season against the Waratahs.
