= Rusiate Nasove =

Fijian rugby union player (born 1995)

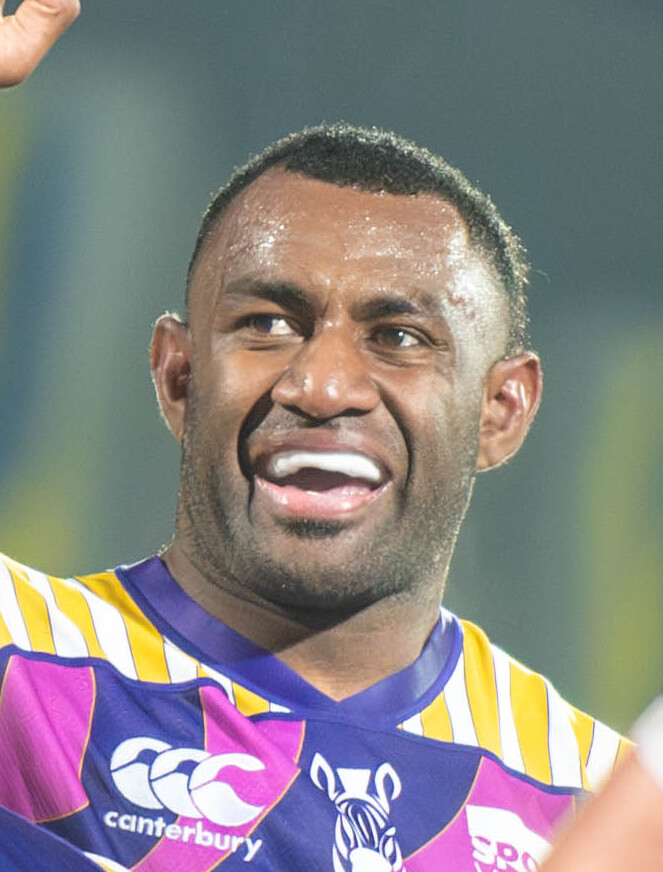
- Nasove in 2025
- Born: 27 October 1995 (age 31) Nadroga-Navosa, Fiji
- Height: 195 cm (6 ft 5 in)
- Weight: 95 kg (209 lb; 14 st 13 lb)
- School: Sigatoka Valley High School

Rugby union career
- Position: Flanker
- Current team: Valorugby Emilia
Senior career
Years	Team	Apps	(Points)
2019−2023	Fijian Drua	11	(5)
2023−2024	Valorugby Emilia	6	(0)
2024−2025	Zebre Parma	11	(10)
2025−	Valorugby Emilia		
- Correct as of 10 February 2022
International career
Years	Team	Apps	(Points)
2022	Fiji	3	(0)

Rusiate Nasove (born 27 October 1995) is a Fijian rugby union player, currently playing for the Italian Valorugby Emilia team in Serie A Elite. His preferred position is flanker.

== Professional career ==
Nasove was named in the Drua squad for the 2022 and 2023 Super Rugby Pacific season. He had previously represented the Drua in the 2019 National Rugby Championship. In October 2023 he signed for Italian Serie A Elite team Valorugby Emilia.

Nasove signed for Zebre Parma in October 2024 ahead of the 2024–25 United Rugby Championship. He made his debut in Round 7 of United Rugby Championship in the 2024–25 season against the Ospreys .

In July 2025, after a season playing for Zebre, he returned to Valorugby Emilia.

On 6 June 2022, he was named in the Fiji squad for the 2022 World Rugby Pacific Nations Cup.
