= Vinaya Habosi =

Fijian rugby union player (born 2000)

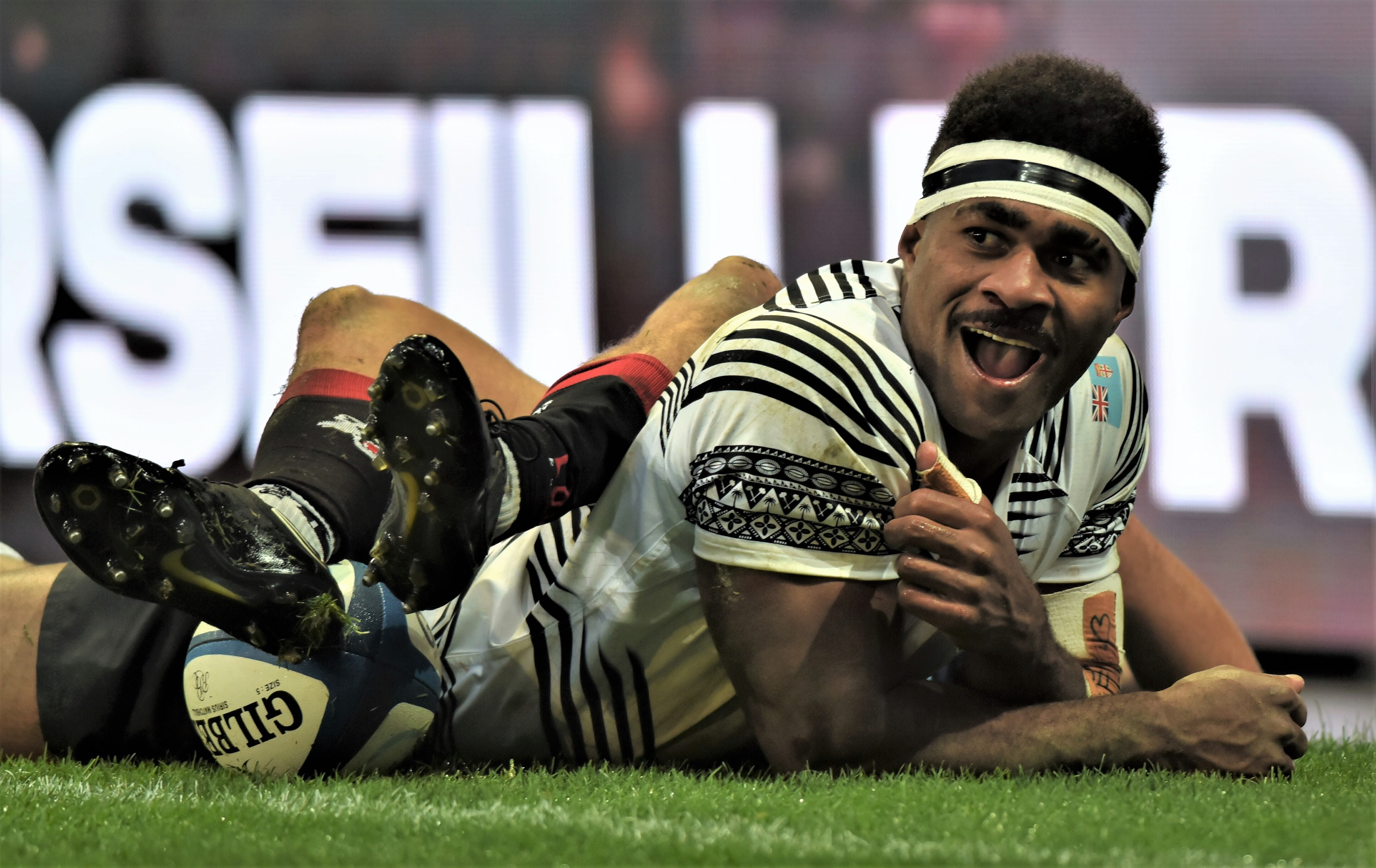
- Born: 30 January 2000 (age 26) Nadroga-Navosa, Fiji
- Height: 176 cm (5 ft 9 in)
- Weight: 92 kg (203 lb; 14 st 7 lb)
- School: Sigatoka Methodist High School

Rugby union career
- Position(s): Wing, Centre
- Current team: Racing 92
Senior career
Years	Team	Apps	(Points)
2022	Fijian Drua	12	(25)
2022–	Racing 92	27	(30)
- Correct as of 25 December 2024
International career
Years	Team	Apps	(Points)
2022–	Fiji	13	(25)

Vinaya Habosi (born 30 January 2000) is a Fijian rugby union player, represented Namosi in the domestic Skipper Cup provincial competition in Fiji where he was selected for the Flying Fijians touring squad for NZ test series in 2021.

In 2022 he was selected for the Fijian Drua in their inaugural season on Super Rugby and also selected for the Flying Fijians for the Pacific Nations Cup whereby he made his debut.

He currently is playing for Racing 92 in the French Top 14. His preferred position is centre or wing.

== Professional career ==
Habosi was named in the Fijian Drua squad for the 2022 Super Rugby Pacific season. He made his debut for the Drua in Round 1 of the 2022 Super Rugby Pacific season against the Waratahs.
