= Apisalome Vota =

Fijian rugby union player (born 1996)

- Born: 6 October 1996 (age 30) Naitasiri, Fiji
- Height: 182 cm (6 ft 0 in)
- Weight: 105 kg (231 lb; 16 st 7 lb)
- School: Navuso Agriculture School

Rugby union career
- Position: Centre
- Current team: Fijian Drua
Senior career
Years	Team	Apps	(Points)
2018–	Fijian Drua	16	(42)
2019–2020	Fijian Latui	3	(5)
- Correct as of 10 June 2022
International career
Years	Team	Apps	(Points)
2018	Fiji Warriors	3	(5)
- Correct as of 10 February 2022

Apisalome Vota (born 6 October 1996) is a Fijian rugby union player, currently playing for the Drua. His preferred position is centre.

== Professional career ==
Vota was named in the Fijian Drua squad for the 2022 Super Rugby Pacific season. He had previously represented the Drua in the 2018 National Rugby Championship.
