= Baden Kerr =

- Full name: Baden Hendry Kerr
- Born: 9 June 1989 (age 37) Auckland, New Zealand
- Height: 190 cm (6 ft 3 in)
- Weight: 90 kg (198 lb; 14 st 2 lb)
- School: Rosehill College
- University: Auckland University of Technology

Rugby union career
- Position(s): Fly-half, Fullback
Senior career
Years	Team	Apps	(Points)
2010–2020	Counties ManukauKaraka Rugby Football Club	45	(407)
2013	Blues	13	(55)
2015	Bedford Blues	9	(9)
2018–2020	Mie Honda Heat	15	(94)
2022	Fijian Drua	3	(8)
- Correct as of 10 February 2022

Baden Kerr (born 9 June 1989) is a New Zealand rugby union player. He plays mainly as a fly-half, but is known to also play as a fullback. He previously played for Fijian Drua in Super Rugby. He also played two seasons with the Blues in Super Rugby.

Having worked his way through the Counties-Manukau system Kerr had previously been a member of the Chiefs Development squad, but his inclusion in Kirwan's Blues squad for 2013 gave him his first opportunity to play at the Super Rugby level. After sitting out the 2014 season through injury, he signed a one-year agreement with Saracens.
