= Peni Matawalu =

Fijian rugby union player (born 1997)

- Full name: Ratu Peni Matawalu
- Born: 8 July 1997 (age 29) Ra, Fiji
- Height: 175 cm (5 ft 9 in)
- Weight: 78 kg (172 lb; 12 st 4 lb)
- Notable relative: Niko Matawalu (brother)

Rugby union career
- Position: Scrum-half
- Current team: Fijian Drua
Senior career
Years	Team	Apps	(Points)
2022	Fijian Drua	8	
- Correct as of 10 February 2022
International career
Years	Team	Apps	(Points)
2016–2017	Fiji U20	5	(6)
- Correct as of 10 February 2022

Ratu Peni Matawalu (born 8 July 1997) is a Fijian rugby union player, currently playing for the Drua. His preferred position is scrum-half.

== Professional career ==
Matawalu was named in the Fijian Drua squad for the 2022 Super Rugby Pacific season. He had previously represented the Drua in the 2019 National Rugby Championship.
