= Ilaisa Droasese =

Fijian rugby union player (born 1999)

- Born: 13 September 1999 (age 27) Fiji
- Height: 185 cm (6 ft 1 in)
- Weight: 99 kg (218 lb; 15 st 8 lb)

Rugby union career
- Position: Centre / Wing / Fullback
- Current team: Reds
Senior career
Years	Team	Apps	(Points)
2019	Brisbane City	0	(0)
2021	Reds	5	(5)
- Correct as of 19 February 2021
International career
Years	Team	Apps	(Points)
2019	Fiji U20	5	(5)
- Correct as of 19 February 2021

Ilaisa Droasese (born 13 September 1999) is a Fijian rugby union player who plays for the Fijian Drua, having previously played for Reds in Super Rugby. His playing position is centre or wing. He was named in the Reds squad for the 2021 Super Rugby AU season. He previously represented the Brisbane City in the 2019 National Rugby Championship. He made his Super Rugby debut in Round 1 of 2021 Super Rugby AU against the Waratahs, scoring a try off the bench. He also plays for Wests in the Queensland Premier Rugby competition.
