= Timoci Sauvoli =

Fijian rugby union player (born 1991)

- Full name: Ratu Timoci Sauvoli
- Born: 26 August 1991 (age 35) Kadavu, Fiji
- Height: 186 cm (6 ft 1 in)
- Weight: 107 kg (236 lb; 16 st 12 lb)
- School: Natabua High School

Rugby union career
- Position: Prop
- Current team: Fijian Drua
Senior career
Years	Team	Apps	(Points)
2019–	Fijian Drua	6	(0)
2020	Fijian Latui	1	(0)
- Correct as of 10 February 2022
International career
Years	Team	Apps	(Points)
2015–2018	Fiji Warriors	6	(0)
- Correct as of 10 February 2022

Ratu Timoci Sauvoli (born 26 August 1991) is a Fijian rugby union player, currently playing for the Drua. His preferred position is prop.

== Professional career ==
Sauvoli was named in the Fijian Drua squad for the 2022 Super Rugby Pacific season. He had previously represented the Drua in the 2019 National Rugby Championship.
