= Zuriel Togiatama =

New Zealand rugby union player

- Born: 3 February 1999 (age 27) Auckland, New Zealand
- Height: 183 cm (6 ft 0 in)
- Weight: 109 kg (240 lb; 17 st 2 lb)
- School: Wesley College

Rugby union career
- Position: Hooker
- Current team: Counties Manukau, Fijian Drua
Senior career
Years	Team	Apps	(Points)
2020–	Counties Manukau	12	(5)
2022–	Fijian Drua	5	(0)
- Correct as of 10 February 2022
International career
Years	Team	Apps	(Points)
2021–	Fiji		

Zuriel Togiatama (born 3 February 1999) is a Fijian rugby union player who plays for Fijian Drua in the Super Rugby competition. His playing position is hooker.
