= Chris Minimbi =

Fijian rugby union player (born 2000)

- Full name: Christopher Noki Minimbi
- Born: 24 January 2000 (age 26) Mount Hagen, Papua New Guinea
- Height: 198 cm (6 ft 6 in)
- Weight: 120 kg (265 lb; 18 st 13 lb)
- School: Marist Brothers High School

Rugby union career
- Position: Lock
- Current team: Fijian Drua
Senior career
Years	Team	Apps	(Points)
2022–	Fijian Drua	6	(0)
- Correct as of 10 February 2022
International career
Years	Team	Apps	(Points)
2019	Fiji U20	5	(0)
2020	Fiji Warriors	3	(0)
2020	Fiji	1	(0)
- Correct as of 10 February 2022

Christopher Noki Minimbi (born 24 January 2000) is a Fijian rugby union player, currently playing for the Drua. His preferred position is lock.

== Professional career ==
Minimbi was named in the Fijian Drua squad for the 2022 Super Rugby Pacific season. Minimbi is a Fiji international, having made his debut against Georgia in 2020.
