= Leone Rotuisolia =

Fijian rugby union player (born 1998)

- Full name: Ratu Leone Rotuisolia
- Born: 21 February 1998 (age 28) Labasa, Fiji
- Height: 194 cm (6 ft 4 in)
- Weight: 123 kg (271 lb; 19 st 5 lb)
- School: Cairns State High School
- Occupation: Athlete

Rugby union career
- Position: Lock
- Current team: Fijian Drua
Senior career
Years	Team	Apps	(Points)
2018–2020	Sydney University	17	(40)
2022–	Fijian Drua	5	(5)
- Correct as of 10 February 2022
International career
Years	Team	Apps	(Points)
2022–	Fiji	2	(5)

Ratu Leone Rotuisolia (born 21 February 1998) is a Fijian rugby union player, currently playing for the Drua. His preferred position is lock. Raised up in Cairns before making the move down to Sydney in 2017 who he later played for Sydney University.

== Professional career ==
Rotuisolia was named in the Sydney University 1st grade side for the 2018 Shute Shield season. He made his debut for Sydney University in Round 1 of the 2018 Shute Shield season against the Parramatta Two Blues.

Rotuisolia was named in the Fijian Drua squad for the 2022 Super Rugby Pacific season. He made his debut for the Drua in Round 2 of the 2022 Super Rugby Pacific season against the Brumbies.

Rotuisolia was named in the Flying Fijian Squad for the July Test that was held in Fiji, didn't get to play due to injury

Rotuisolia was also named in the Flying Fijians squad for the 2022 Autumn Nations test series in November. He made his debut for the Flying Fijians in the opening game against Scotland at Murrayfield Stadium.
