= Jona Mataiciwa =

Fiji rugby union player

- Born: 11 April 1999 (age 27) Beqa, Fiji
- Height: 184 cm (6 ft 0 in)
- Weight: 90 kg (198 lb; 14 st 2 lb)
- School: St. Kentigern College

Rugby union career
- Position: Wing
- Current team: Fijian Drua
Senior career
Years	Team	Apps	(Points)
2022–	Fijian Drua	0	(0)
- Correct as of 10 February 2022

Jona Mataiciwa is a Fiji rugby union player for the Drua. His preferred position is wing.

== Professional career ==
Mataiciwa was named in the Fijian Drua squad for Round 3 of the 2022 Super Rugby Pacific season. He made his debut for the Drua in Round 3 of the 2022 Super Rugby Pacific season against the Rebels.
