= Haereiti Hetet =

Fijian rugby union player

- Born: 10 July 1997 (age 29) Ōtorohanga, New Zealand
- Height: 182 cm (6 ft 0 in)
- Weight: 117 kg (258 lb; 18 st 6 lb)
- School: Ōtorohanga College
- Notable relative: Joeli Veitayaki (father)

Rugby union career
- Position: Prop
- Current team: Bay of Plenty, Fijian Drua
Senior career
Years	Team	Apps	(Points)
2018–2019	Waikato	8	(0)
2020–	Bay of Plenty	21	(0)
2022–	Fijian Drua	27	(0)
- Correct as of 13 December 2024
International career
Years	Team	Apps	(Points)
2019	Māori All Blacks	1	(0)
2020–	Fiji	15	(0)
- Correct as of 13 December 2024

Haereiti Hetet (born 10 July 1997) is a Fijian rugby union player who currently plays as a prop for Bay of Plenty in the National Provincial Championship and the Fijian Drua in Super Rugby.

Hetet was born and raised in New Zealand, but has represented Fiji internationally, for which he is eligible due to his Fijian heritage. He is the son of former Flying Fijian prop, Joeli Veitayaki. Hetet made his debut for Fiji on 5 December 2020 against Georgia.

Hetet, who is of Ngāti Maniapoto descent via his mother, played for the Māori All Blacks against Fiji in Suva on 13 July 2019.
