= Tuidraki Samusamuvodre =

Fijian rugby union player (born 1998)

- Born: 16 February 1998 (age 28) Fiji
- Height: 185 cm (6 ft 1 in)
- Weight: 80 kg (176 lb; 12 st 8 lb)

Rugby union career
- Position: Fly-half / Wing / Fullback
- Current team: Fijian Drua
Senior career
Years	Team	Apps	(Points)
2021	New England Free Jacks	8	(10)
2022–	Fijian Drua	1	(0)
- Correct as of 1 April 2022
International career
Years	Team	Apps	(Points)
2019–	Fiji Warriors	6	(43)
- Correct as of 1 April 2022

Tuidraki Samusamuvodre (born 16 February 1998) is a Fijian rugby union player, currently playing for the Drua. His preferred position is fly-half, wing or fullback.

== Professional career ==
Samusamuvodre was named in the Fijian Drua squad for the 2022 Super Rugby Pacific season. He made his debut for the Drua in Round 7 of the 2022 Super Rugby Pacific season against the Waratahs. He previously represented the New England Free Jacks in the 2021 Major League Rugby season.
