= Te Ahiwaru Cirikidaveta =

New Zealand rugby union player (born 1998)

- Born: 12 April 1998 (age 28) Te Araroa, New Zealand
- Height: 194 cm (6 ft 4 in)
- Weight: 110 kg (243 lb; 17 st 5 lb)
- School: St. Kentigern College

Rugby union career
- Position(s): Lock, Flanker, Number 8
Senior career
Years	Team	Apps	(Points)
2017–2024	Tasman	43	(25)
2022–2024	Fijian Drua	28	(15)
- Correct as of 2 October 2024
International career
Years	Team	Apps	(Points)
2023	Fiji	9	(0)
- Correct as of 2 October 2024

Te Ahiwaru Cirikidaveta (born 12 April 1998) is a New Zealand born, Fijian rugby union player. He can play in the Lock, Flanker and Number 8 positions.

== Early career ==
Te Ahiwaru was born in the small East Coast town of Te Araroa in April 1998. His mother solely raised him. His father, who he didn’t meet until 2022, was born in Fiji.

Te Ahiwaru was educated in a total immersion school in Te Araroa up until year 11, 2013. He then moved to Hicks Bay High School to finish off his last two years of College.

At this time, Rico Gear, a former All Black, identified him as a talent and news of his ability was quickly passed through to both the Hurricanes and the Crusaders.

In 2014 Te Ahiwaru was offered a full scholarship to attend St Kentigern College in Auckland for his final two years of school. From 2015 to 2016, Te Ahiwaru played in the schools top side as a number 8.

He played age group for both the East Coast and Hurricanes up until 2016 and was then selected by the Hurricanes Under 18 to travel to Christchurch and play against the Crusaders Under 18 as a curtain raiser game.

In August 2016 he was chosen in the Under 18, New Zealand Maori Development Team.

== Tasman ==
Cirikidaveta made his debut for Tasman in Round 9 of the 2017 Mitre 10 Cup against Counties Manukau at Pukekohe Stadium in Auckland. In September 2020 he was named in the Tasman Mako squad for the 2020 Mitre 10 Cup. Cirikidaveta played all 12 games for the Mako in the 2020 season as they went on to win their second premiership title in a row. Cirikidaveta had another good season during the 2021 Bunnings NPC as Tasman made the final before losing 23–20 to Waikato.

== Super Rugby ==
In September 2021 Cirikidaveta signed with the Fijian Drua for the 2022 Super Rugby Pacific season, the first season in the competition for the side. He made his Super Rugby debut against the Waratahs in Round 1.

== Fiji ==
In 2022 he was named in the Fiji national rugby union team for their July test matches.
