= Meli Tuni =

Fijian rugby union player (born 2000)

- Born: 29 June 2000 (age 26) Fiji
- Height: 184 cm (6 ft 0 in)
- Weight: 99 kg (218 lb; 15 st 8 lb)

Rugby union career
- Position: Prop
- Current team: Fijian Drua
Senior career
Years	Team	Apps	(Points)
2022–	Fijian Drua	1	(0)
- Correct as of 23 April 2022
International career
Years	Team	Apps	(Points)
2019	Fiji U20	1	(0)
2020–	Fiji Warriors	2	(0)
- Correct as of 23 April 2022

Meli Tuni (born 29 June 2000) is a Fijian rugby union player, currently playing for the Drua. His preferred position is prop.

== Professional career ==
Tuni was named in the Fijian Drua squad for the 2022 Super Rugby Pacific season. He made his debut for the Drua in Round 10 of the 2022 Super Rugby Pacific season against the Blues.
