= Sorovakatini Tuifagalele =

Fijian rugby union player (born 1994)

- Born: 15 June 1994 (age 32) Vanua Balavu, Fiji
- Height: 197 cm (6 ft 6 in)
- Weight: 122 kg (269 lb; 19 st 3 lb)
- School: Suva Grammar School

Rugby union career
- Position: Lock
- Current team: Fijian Drua
Senior career
Years	Team	Apps	(Points)
2020	Fijian Latui	1	(0)
2022–	Fijian Drua	4	(0)
- Correct as of 10 February 2022

Sorovakatini Tuifagalele (born 15 June 1994) is a Fijian rugby union player, currently playing for the Drua. His preferred position is lock.

== Professional career ==
Tuifagalele was named in the Fijian Drua squad for the 2022 Super Rugby Pacific season. He made his debut for the Drua in Round 4 of the 2022 Super Rugby Pacific season against the Reds.
