= Nemani Nagusa =

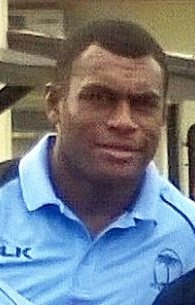
- Full name: Dine Kesa Nemani Nagusa
- Born: 21 July 1988 (age 38) Nadi, Fiji
- Height: 188 cm (6 ft 2 in)
- Weight: 110 kg (243 lb; 17 st 5 lb)
- School: Cuvu College

Rugby union career
- Position(s): Number 8, Flanker
- Current team: Fijian Drua
Senior career
Years	Team	Apps	(Points)
2012	Wanganui	3	(0)
2014	Tasman	2	(0)
2017–2018	Aurillac	10	(0)
2018–2020	Newcastle Falcons	24	(45)
2022–	Fijian Drua	5	(5)
- Correct as of 29 March 2022
International career
Years	Team	Apps	(Points)
2012–2019	Fiji	18	(0)
2015–2016	Fiji Warriors	7	(5)
- Correct as of 10 February 2022
National sevens team
Years	Team		Comps
2012–2017	Fiji		21
- Correct as of 10 February 2022

Nemani Nagusi (born 21 July 1988) is a Fiji rugby union player. His usual position is as a Flanker, and he currently plays for Fijian Drua in Super Rugby Pacific.

== Club career ==
=== Fijian Drua ===
On 21 January 2022 Nagusi was named as the inaugural captain of Fijian Drua.
