= Simione Kuruvoli (rugby union) =

Fijian rugby union player (born 1999)

- Born: 2 January 1999 (age 27) Kadavu, Fiji
- Height: 174 cm (5 ft 9 in)
- Weight: 78 kg (172 lb; 12 st 4 lb)
- School: Lelean Memorial School

Rugby union career
- Position: Scrum-half
- Current team: Rugby Club Vannes
Senior career
Years	Team	Apps	(Points)
2022–2026	Fijian Drua	5	(8)
2026–	Rugby Club Vannes	5	(0)
- Correct as of 26 April 2022
International career
Years	Team	Apps	(Points)
2018–2019	Fiji U20	9	(22)
2019–2020	Fiji Warriors	6	(30)
2020–	Fiji	26	(54)
- Correct as of 10 February 2022

Simione Kuruvoli (born 2 January 1999) is a Fijian rugby union player, currently playing for Rugby Club Vannes in the Top 14, with his position being scrum-half.

== Professional career ==
Kuruvoli was named in the Fijian Drua squad for the 2022 Super Rugby Pacific season. Kuruvoli is a Fiji international, having made his debut against Georgia in 2020.
