= Tevita Ikanivere =

Fijian rugby union player (born 1999)

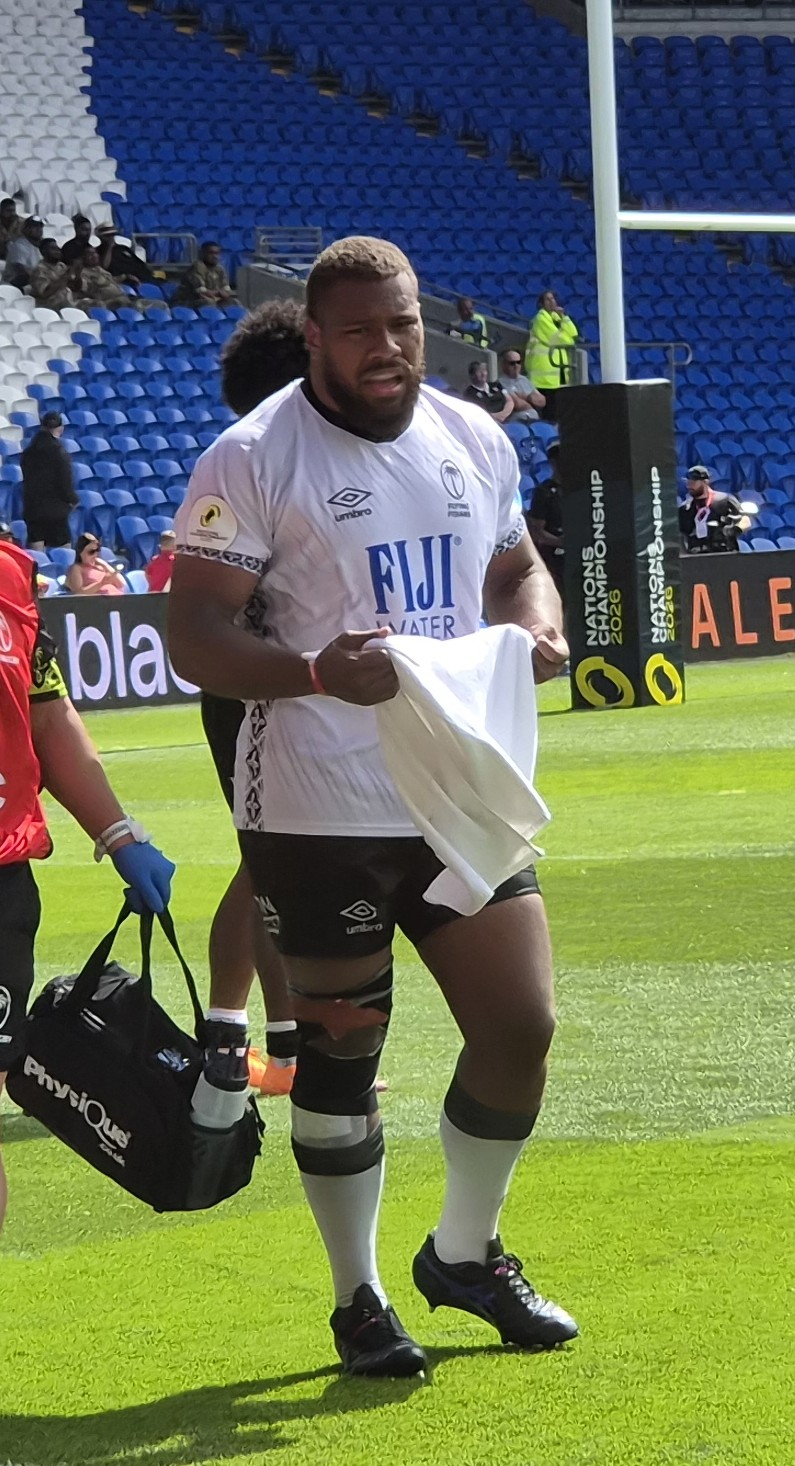
- 2026 Nations Championship in Cardiff, Wales
- Full name: Tevita Veicavuaki Ikanivere
- Born: 6 September 1999 (age 27) Ono-i-Lau, Fiji
- Height: 183 cm (6 ft 0 in)
- Weight: 113 kg (249 lb; 17 st 11 lb)
- School: Queen Victoria School, Holy Trinity Anglican School

Rugby union career
- Position: Hooker
- Current team: Honda Heat
Senior career
Years	Team	Apps	(Points)
2019–2025	Fijian Drua	25	(35)
2025–	Honda Heat	17	(50)
- Correct as of 2025
International career
Years	Team	Apps	(Points)
2018–2019	Fiji U20	8	(10)
2019	Fiji Warriors	1	(0)
2020–	Fiji	13	(35)
- Correct as of 10 February 2022

Tevita Veicavuaki Ikanivere (born 6 September 1999) is a Fijian rugby union player, currently playing for the Mie Honda Heat in the Japanese Rugby League One (JRLO). His team position is hooker.

== Professional career ==
Ikanivere was named in the Fijian Drua squad for the 2022 Super Rugby Pacific season. He had previously represented the Drua in the 2019 National Rugby Championship. Ikanivere is a Fiji international, having made his debut against Georgia in 2020.

Nicknamed "Tex" by his teammate as an abbreviation of his first name, Ikanivere is a graduate of the development pathway in Fiji's HPU system being identified whilst being captain of his school's Queen Victoria School (Fiji) U18 rugby team and recruited into the Fiji Rugby Union High Performance Unit and then onto all Fiji age-grade teams Fiji U18, Fiji U20, Fiji Warriors, Fijian Latui before becoming a fully fledged professional with the Fijian Drua in the Super Rugby Pacific competition.

At the end of the 2025 Super Rugby Pacific season, which saw the Fijian Drua finish second-last on the season ladder, Ikanivere signed for Mie Honda Heat Japan Rugby League One ahead of the 2025–26 season. Ikanivere was one of three high-profile international players (alongside Franco Mostert and Pablo Matera) that were announced in the teams squad.
