= Skipper Cup =

- Sport: Rugby Union
- Instituted: 1963
- Country: Fiji
- Most titles: Nadroga (14 titles)
- Broadcast partner: FBC TV
- Relegation to: Vodafone Vanua Championship

The Skipper Cup (formerly the Sanyo Cup and The Digicel Cup) is the Fiji Rugby Union's national provincial Premier rugby union championship. The competition runs from May to September and is contested between the country's top 8 provincial sides. At the end of the competition the top 4 teams qualify for the semi-finals, with the winners moving on to the final. The competition has been sponsored by the phone company Digicel since 2008. Prior to that the trophy was called the Sanyo Cup.

== Teams ==
Est.	Club	Nickname	Premierships (most recent)
1958	Nadi	Jets	2022, 2008, 2007, 1989
1959	Lautoka		1991, 2003
1998	Naitasiri	Bulls	1999, 2000, 2002, 2010
1957	Nadroga	Stallions	1993, 1996, 1998, 2004, 2005, 2006, 2009, 2011, 2012, 2013, 2014, 2015, 2016, 2017
1913	Suva		2018, 2019, 2020
1989	Namosi		
1997	Tailevu		1997, 2001
2003	Northland		
2000	Rewa		
2023	Malolo	Blacks	2025

== See also ==
- National Rugby Championship
- Rugby union in Fiji
- Fiji Warriors
