= 2027 Super Rugby Pacific season =

Men's rugby union club competition

- Dates: 12 February – 26 June 2027
- Countries: Australia (4 teams); Fiji (1 team); New Zealand (5 teams)
- Tournament format(s): Round-robin and knockout
- Official website: super.rugby/superrugby

The 2027 Super Rugby Pacific season is the 32nd season of Super Rugby, an annual rugby union competition organised by SANZAAR between teams from Australia, Fiji, and New Zealand. The tournament format and Grand Final date were announced in July 2026, with the tournament being reduced to ten teams following the departure of the Moana Pasifika.

The defending champions are the Hurricanes, who won their second title in 2026.

== Background and competition ==
=== Reduction to ten teams ===
In April 2026, Moana Pasifika, an Auckland-based Super Rugby team since 2022, announced they would disband at the end of the 2026 season due to ongoing financial and operational difficulties, with the club reportedly carrying millions of dollars in debt and annual operating costs of around NZ$7 million. New Zealand Rugby (NZR) officially confirmed the team's withdrawal on 24 June 2026, although a return in 2028 was left open as a possibility.

The club's departure reduced Super Rugby Pacific to ten teams for 2027, the competition's smallest size since the Super 10 era. It also marked the second franchise to fold in three years, following the Melbourne Rebels in 2024. Reports suggested the reduced competition could enable a full 18-round home-and-away season and potentially lead to relaxed player eligibility rules between Australian and New Zealand teams.

In July 2026, SANZAAR confirmed the increase in matches and a restructuring of finals.

=== Format ===
The 2027 season features an expanded regular season and a revised finals format designed to increase the importance of every match. The competition is scheduled to begin on 12 February 2027, with all ten teams playing 16 regular season matches across a 17-week schedule, two more games than in 2026 due to an extra competition week and the reduction of byes from two to one. A key addition to the calendar is the inaugural Anzac Day Bledisloe Cup Test, with national squads selected following round nine. This was stated to make the opening half of the season especially important for players aiming to earn international selection.

The top six teams qualify for the finals. However, the teams finishing first and second receive a bye directly to the semi-finals, while third hosts sixth and fourth hosts fifth in sudden-death elimination finals. The winners then travel to face the top two teams in the semi-finals, with the victors advancing to the Grand Final on 26 June. This revised format was geared to reward strong regular season performances by offering greater advantages to the highest-ranked teams while delivering more matches and higher stakes throughout the season.

Unchanged since the inaugural season of the Super Rugby Pacific, standings were based on competition points: four for a win, two for a draw, and zero for a loss. Bonus points were awarded for scoring three or more tries than the opponent or for losing by seven points or fewer.

== Teams and personnel ==
=== Overview ===
Union	Team	Stadia information		Coach	Captain
Union	Team	Stadia	Capacity	Coach	Captain
Australia	Brumbies	GIO Stadium, Canberra	25,011	Stephen Larkham	TBD
Australia	Brumbies	Corroboree Group Oval, Canberra	15,000	Stephen Larkham	TBD
Australia	Force	HBF Park, Perth	20,500	Simon Cron	TBD
Australia	Reds	Suncorp Stadium, Brisbane	52,500	Vern Cotter	TBD
Australia	Waratahs	Allianz Stadium, Sydney	42,500	Michael Cheika	TBD
Fiji	Drua	HFC Bank Stadium, Suva	15,446	Brad Mooar	TBD
Fiji	Drua	Four R Stadium, Ba	13,500	Brad Mooar	TBD
Fiji	Drua	Churchill Park, Lautoka	10,000	Brad Mooar	TBD
New Zealand	Blues	Eden Park, Auckland	50,000	Jason Holland	TBD
New Zealand	Chiefs	FMG Stadium Waikato, Hamilton	25,800	Jono Gibbes	TBD
New Zealand	Chiefs	Stadium Taranaki, New Plymouth	30,345	Jono Gibbes	TBD
New Zealand	Crusaders	One NZ Stadium, Christchurch	30,000	Scott Hansen	TBD
New Zealand	Highlanders	Forsyth Barr Stadium, Dunedin	30,748	Jamie Joseph	TBD
New Zealand	Highlanders	Rugby Park, Invercargill	18,000	Jamie Joseph	TBD
New Zealand	Hurricanes	Hnry Stadium, Wellington	34,500	Clark Laidlaw	TBD
New Zealand	Hurricanes	McLean Park, Napier	19,700	Clark Laidlaw	TBD

=== Personnel changes ===
Team	Outgoing coach	Date of vacancy	Incoming coach
Drua	Glen Jackson	June 2026	Brad Mooar
Reds	Les Kiss	June 2026	Vern Cotter
Blues	Vern Cotter	June 2026	Jason Holland
Crusaders	Rob Penney	June 2026	Scott Hansen
Waratahs	Dan McKellar	29 June 2026	Michael Cheika

=== Locations ===
2027 Super Rugby Pacific season (Oceania)
Home locations of all the 2027 Super Rugby teams

== Regular season ==
=== Standings ===
2027 Super Rugby Pacific standings
Pos	Team	Pld	W	D	L	PF	PA	PD	TF	TA	TB	LB	Pts	Qualification
1	Blues	0	0	0	0	0	0	0	0	0	0	0	0	Semi-finals
2	Brumbies	0	0	0	0	0	0	0	0	0	0	0	0	Semi-finals
3	Chiefs	0	0	0	0	0	0	0	0	0	0	0	0	Elimination finals
4	Crusaders	0	0	0	0	0	0	0	0	0	0	0	0	Elimination finals
5	Drua	0	0	0	0	0	0	0	0	0	0	0	0	Elimination finals
6	Force	0	0	0	0	0	0	0	0	0	0	0	0	Elimination finals
7	Highlanders	0	0	0	0	0	0	0	0	0	0	0	0	
8	Hurricanes	0	0	0	0	0	0	0	0	0	0	0	0	
9	Reds	0	0	0	0	0	0	0	0	0	0	0	0	
10	Waratahs	0	0	0	0	0	0	0	0	0	0	0	0	

First match(es) will be played: 12 February 2027. Source: Super Rugby

Competition rules
Competition points breakdown:
* 4 competition points for a win
* 2 competition points for a draw
* 1 competition bonus point for a loss by seven points or less
* 1 competition bonus point for scoring at least three tries more than the opponent in a match
Tiebreaker rules:
If, at any stage, teams have the same number of competition points, the following tiebreaker rules apply (in this order) to determine their standing:
* Most wins from all matches
* Highest difference between total points for and total points against from all matches (points difference)
* Most tries scored from all matches
* Highest difference between total tries for and total tries against from all matches
* Coin toss

=== Round-by-round ===
The table below shows each team's progression throughout the season. For each round, their cumulative points total is shown with the overall log position in brackets:

Team progression
Team	R1	R2	R3	R4	R5	R6	R7	R8 (SR)	R9	R10	R11	R12	R13	R14	R15	R16	R17	EF	SF	Final
Blues										Bye										
Brumbies											Bye									
Chiefs											Bye									
Crusaders											Bye									
Drua											Bye									
Force											Bye									
Highlanders											Bye									
Hurricanes											Bye									
Reds										Bye										
Waratahs											Bye									
Key:	Win	Draw	Loss	Bye	DNQ = Did not qualify															

=== Matches ===
Home \ Away	BLU	BRU	CHI	CRU	DRU	FOR	HIG	HUR	RED	WAR
Blues	—	1 May	9 Apr	28 Feb	7 May		29 May	13 Feb	6 Mar	3 Apr
Brumbies		—	28 May	7 May	6 Mar	19 Mar	27 Feb	16 Apr	10 Apr	12 Feb
Chiefs	13 Mar		—	1 May	16 Apr	3 Apr	22 May	28 Mar	14 May	27 Feb
Crusaders	26 Mar	2 Apr	6 Mar	—		28 May	12 Mar	19 Feb	12 Feb	15 May
Drua	20 Mar	15 May		21 May	—	10 Apr	13 Feb	30 Apr	27 Feb	29 May
Force	15 May	19 Feb	13 Feb	17 Apr	4 Jun	—	9 May		12 Mar	27 Mar
Highlanders	20 Feb	27 Mar	20 Mar	5 Jun	4 Apr	5 Mar	—	16 May		17 Apr
Hurricanes	4 Jun	22 May	8 May	19 Mar	13 Mar	26 Feb	10 Apr	—	4 Apr	
Reds	24 Apr	4 Jun	21 Feb		28 Mar	21 May	1 May	29 May	—	20 Mar
Waratahs	22 May	13 May	5 Jun	11 Apr	20 Feb	2 May		5 Mar	8 May	—

Updated to match(es) played on unknown. Source: Super Rugby
Legend: Blue = home team win; Yellow = draw; Red = away team win.

== Finals ==
Elimination finals
11/12 June
11/12 June

Semi-finals
18/19 June
18/19 June

Final
26 June

=== Elimination finals ===
11/12 June

3rd/4th	v	5th/6th

11/12 June

3rd/4th	v	5th/6th

=== Semi-finals ===
18/19 June

1st/2nd	v	TBD

18/19 June

1st/2nd	v	TBD

=== Final ===
26 June

TBD	v	TBD

== Players ==
=== Squads ===
The following squads have been named. Players listed as WTG are players named in the wider training groups. Players listed as Dev are players named in development groups. Players listed in italics denote non-original squad members:

Blues squad
Forwards	Ben Ake • Torian Barnes • Josh Beehre • Cam Christie • Che Clark • Tristyn Cook • Sam Darry • Josh Fusitu'a • Jack Lee • Jed Melvin • James Mullan • Eli Oudenryn • Marcel Renata • Ardie Savea • Anton Segner • Bradley Slater • Patrick Tuipulotu • Ofa Tuʻungafasi • Malachi Wrampling • Flyn Yates
Backs	Pita Ahki • Kade Banks • Beauden Barrett • James Cameron • Finlay Christie • Caleb Clarke • Taufa Funaki • Leo Gordon • Rieko Ioane • Darby Lancaster • Cam Millar • Nic Shearer • Rico Simpson • Payton Spencer • Zarn Sullivan • Xavi Taele • Rory Taylor • Cody Vai
WTG	Tom Barham • Tyson Belworthy • Esile Fono • Cameron Howell • Jordan Hutchings • Cohen Norrie • Harlyn Saunoa • Tevita Tatafu • Riley Tofilau • Sam Tuitupou • Leka Tuʻungafasi • Caleb Woodley
Coach	Jason Holland

Brumbies squad
Forwards	Allan Alaalatoa • Tevita Alatini • Liam Bowron • Darcy Breen • Charlie Cale • Harvey Cordukes • Nick Frost • Lington Ieli • Eli Langi • Lachlan Lonergan • Toby Macpherson • Billy Pollard • Blake Schoupp • Rory Scott • Lachlan Shaw • James Slipper • Aiden Stait • TJ Talaileva • Leafi Talataina • Rob Valetini • Rhys van Nek
Backs	Tane Edmed • David Feliuai • Len Ikitau • Ryan Lonergan • Jarrah McLeod • Declan Meredith • Andy Muirhead • Dan Nelson • Kye Oates • Kadin Pritchard • Triston Reilly • Ollie Sapsford • Klayton Thorn • Corey Toole • Tom Wright
Coach	Stephen Larkham

Chiefs squad
Forwards	Seuseu Naitoa Ah Kuoi • Kaylum Boshier • Jahrome Brown • George Dyer • Luke Jacobson • Corey Kellow • Jai Knight • Taine Kolose • Paula Latu • Daniel Lienert-Brown • Josh Lord • Tevita Mafileo • Brodie McAlister • Ollie Norris • Simon Parker • Jared Proffit • Fiti Sa • Jayden Sa • Wallace Sititi • Samisoni Taukei'aho • Tyrone Thompson • Tupou Vaa'i • Aisake Vakasiuola
Backs	Kyle Brown • Leroy Carter • Tepaea Cook-Savage • Isaac Hutchinson • Richard Judd • Taha Kemara • Anton Lienert-Brown • Damian McKenzie • Emoni Narawa • Cortez Ratima • Daniel Rona • Daniel Sinkinson • Charlie Sinton • Kyren Taumoefolau • Quinn Tupaea • Frank Vaenuku
WTG	Mosese Bason • Rui Farrant • Andrew Knewstubb • Kurene Luamanuvae • Will Martin • Michael Naitokani • JJ Pokai • Dallas Rata-Makene • Nathan Stephens • Samu Tawake • Keightley Watson • Haki Wiseman
Coach	Jono Gibbes

Crusaders squad
Forwards	Scott Barrett • George Bell • Ethan Blackadder • George Bower • Finlay Brewis • Tahlor Cahill • Seb Calder • Clément Castets • Dominic Gardiner • Jamie Hannah • Liam Jack • Johnny Lee • Manumaua Letiu • Christian Lio-Willie • Oli Mathis • Finn McLeod • Fletcher Newell • Feleti Sae-Taʻufoʻou • Xavier Saifoloi • Codie Taylor • Xavier Treacy • Tamaiti Williams
Backs	Toby Bell • Mitchell Drummond • Corey Evans • Leicester Faingaʻanuku • Chay Fihaki • Noah Hotham • Will Jordan • Maloni Kunawave • Kurtis MacDonald • Johnny McNicholl • Richie Mo'unga • Kyle Preston • Rivez Reihana • Cooper Roberts • Macca Springer • Jake Te Hiwi • James White
WTG	Jae Broomfield • Gus Brown • Max Fale • Jake Frost • Aaron Gibbs • Cooper Grant • Jayden Henderson • Joel Lam • Monu Moli • Vea Taumoefolau • Konrad Toleafoa • Logan Williams
Coach	Scott Hansen

Drua squad
Forwards	Penaia Cakobau • Meli Derenalagi • Mesake Doge • Mesu Dolokoto • Haereiti Hetet • Temo Mayanavanua • Vilive Miramira • Motikai Murray • Isi Naisarani • Leone Nakarawa • Josefa Namosimalua • Manueli Ratuniyarawa • Peni Ravai • Sairusi Ravudi • Inoke Ravuiwasa • Harold Rounds • Kitione Salawa • Kavaia Tagivetaua • Meli Tuni • Emosi Tuqiri • Isoa Tuwai • Mesake Vocevoce
Backs	Isaiah Armstrong-Ravula • Philip Baselala • Isikeli Basiyalo • Nacani Boginisoko • Issak Fines-Leleiwasa • Frank Lomani • Manasa Mataele • Epeli Momo • Iosefo Namoce • Joji Nasova • Isikeli Rabitu • Taniela Rakuro • Tuidraki Samusamuvodre • Maika Tuitubou • Virimi Vakatawa • Kemu Valetini • Ben Volavola
Dev	Moses Armstrong-Ravula • Joeli Baleilevuka • Kavekini Boselawa • Marika Koroi • Tevita Ledua • Breyton Legge • Maleli Nauvasi • Luke Tuvalu • Viliame Tuwai • Joshua Uluibau • Sakiusa Vosayaco • Jeneiro Wakeham • Sam Wye
Coach	Brad Mooar

Force squad
Forwards	Albert Alcock • Netani Baleisomosomo • Nick Champion de Crespigny • Jack Daly • Nic Dolly • Aden Ekanayake • Misinale Epenisa • Sef Fa'agase • Lopeti Faifua • Gus Farnan • Kenny Harris • Will Harris • Zak Healey • Bradley Kuhn • Reuben O'Neill • Leonel Oviedo • Brandon Paenga-Amosa • Marley Pearce • Tom Robertson • Max Sawers • Joshua Smith • Carlo Tizzano • Jeremy Williams
Backs	Luke Aiken • Tama Anderson • Taj Annan • Kurtley Beale • Wallace Charlie • Ben Donaldson • Boston Fakafanua • Harrison Goddard • Mac Grealy • Nathan Hastie • Alex Harford • Ronan Leahy • Zac Lomax • Harry McLaughlin-Phillips • Agustín Moyano • James O'Connor • Divad Palu • Dylan Pietsch • James Ramm • Henry Robertson • Hamish Stewart
Coach	Simon Cron

Highlanders squad
Forwards	Jermaine Ainsley • Josh Bartlett • Henry Bell • Nikora Broughton • Lucas Casey • Ethan de Groot • Mitchell Dunshea • Shannon Frizell • Fabian Holland • TK Howden • Benet Kumeroa • Veveni Lasaqa • Tomás Lavanini • Saula Ma'u • Ioane Moananu • Jack Sexton • Will Stodart • Angus Taʻavao • Joseva Tamani • Jack Taylor • Josh Tengblad • Sean Withy
Backs	Folau Fakatava • Meihana Grindlay • Finn Hurley • Josh Jacomb • Adam Lennox • Mika Muliaina • Jona Nareki • Reesjan Pasitoa • Patrick Pellegrini • Dylan Pledger • Jacob Ratumaitavuki-Kneepkens • Stanley Solomon • Caleb Tangitau • Timoci Tavatavanawai • Xavier Tito-Harris • Tuna Tuitama • Josh Whaanga
WTG	Phoenix Abbott • Reuben Allen • Austin Anderson • Manaaki Boyle-Tiatia • Senita Lauaki • Ben Lopas • Kieran McClea • Sam Nemec-Vial • Nic Sauira • Solomone Tukuafu
Coach	Jamie Joseph

Hurricanes squad
Forwards	Alefosio Aho • Asafo Aumua • Vernon Bason • Caleb Delany • Jacob Devery • Dylan Eti • Oliver Haig • Brayden Iose • Du'Plessis Kirifi • Peter Lakai • Siale Lauaki • Tyrel Lomax • Hunter Morrison • Xavier Numia • Hugo Plummer • Arese Poliko • Brad Shields • Pasilio Tosi • Tito Tuipulotu • Semisi Tupou Ta'eiloa • Raymond Tuputupu • Rohan Wingham
Backs	Tamiro Armstrong • Jordie Barrett • Brett Cameron • Fehi Fineanganofo • Harry Godfrey • Josh Gray • Bryn Hall • Callum Harkin • Ruben Love • Josh Moorby • Heremaia Murray • Kini Naholo • Billy Proctor • Ngane Punivai • Cam Roigard • Jone Rova • Jordi Viljoen
WTG	Garouw Basson • Will Cole • Johnny Falloon • Taniela Filimone • Malakai Hala-Ngatai • Patrick Mauga • Matolu Petaia • Lukas Ripley • Waisake Salabiau • Jai Tamati • Logan Wallace
Coach	Clark Laidlaw

Reds squad
Forwards	George Blake • Nick Bloomfield • Joe Brial • Toby Brial • Charlie Brosnan • John Bryant • Josh Canham • Massimo de Lutiis • Matt Faessler • Lachlan Hooper • Zac Hough • Trevor King • Tom Lambert • Vaiuta Latu • Fraser McReight • Josh Nasser • Cadeyrn Neville • Zane Nonggorr • Tom Robinson • Aidan Ross • Will Ross • Lukhan Salakaia-Loto • Kingsley Uys • Harry Wilson
Backs	Lachie Anderson • Nicholas Conway • Filipo Daugunu • Carter Gordon • Isaac Henry • Tom Lynagh • Finn Mackay • James Martens • Tate McDermott • Coby Miln • Dre Pakeho • Izaia Perese • Treyvon Pritchard • Xavier Rubens • Tim Ryan • Taione Taka • Kalani Thomas
Coach	Vern Cotter

Waratahs squad
Forwards	Miles Amatosero • Jack Barrett • Angus Bell • Daniel Botha • Ethan Dobbins • Eamon Doyle • Folau Fainga'a • Isaac Fonua • George Francis • Clem Halaholo • Isaac Aedo Kailea • Sefo Kautai • Edwin Langi • Marshall Le Maitre • Matt Philip • Veikoso Poloniati • Apolosi Ranawai • Luke Reimer • Pete Samu • Angus Scott-Young
Backs	Max Burey • Angus Crichton • Bernard Foley • Joey Fowler • Jake Gordon • Angus Grover • Sid Harvey • Jimmy Hendren • Max Jorgensen • Henry O'Donnell • Nick Phipps • George Poolman • Harry Potter • Otto Serfontein • Joseph-Aukuso Sua'ali'i • Teddy Wilson
Coach	Michael Cheika
