= List of 2027 Super Rugby Pacific matches =

The 2027 Super Rugby Pacific draw was announced on 15 September 2026, following the release of the competition's Super Round and marquee fixtures the previous week. With an increase in matches played, some teams will play Trans-Tasman matchups twice (one at home, one away) during the season, a first in the competition's history.

The 2027 Anzac Bledisloe Test between Australia and New Zealand on Anzac Day, 25 April, which was confirmed in June 2026, necessitated changes to the Super Rugby schedule for that weekend. The Queensland Reds had reportedly booked one match in place for the affected round which was later confirmed, with the fixture to be played at Suncorp Stadium, the same venue that will host the Anzac Test. This also marked the first time since 2018 that the domestic season had been interrupted by an international fixture.

== Round 1 ==
12 February 2027
19:35 NZDT (UTC+13)

Crusaders	v	Reds

One NZ Stadium, Christchurch

12 February 2027
19:45 AEDT (UTC+11)

Brumbies	v	Waratahs

GIO Stadium, Canberra

13 February 2027
15:35 FJT (UTC+12)

Drua	v	Highlanders

Four R Stadium, Ba (Note: The venues for the Drua's home games weren't yet known at the time the schedule for the 2027 Super Rugby Pacific season was released. On 21 October 2026, the Drua announced the round 1 game against the Highlanders on 13 February 2027; the round 9 game against the Force on 10 April 2027; and the round 16 game against the Waratahs on 29 May 2027 would be played at Four R Stadium, Ba.)

13 February 2027
19:05 NZDT (UTC+13)

Blues	v	Hurricanes

Eden Park, Auckland

13 February 2027
16:35 AWST (UTC+8)

Force	v	Chiefs

HBF Park, Perth

== Round 2 ==
19 February 2027
19:35 NZDT (UTC+13)

Crusaders	v	Hurricanes

One NZ Stadium, Christchurch

19 February 2027
18:00 AWST (UTC+8)

Force	v	Brumbies

HBF Park, Perth

20 February 2027
19:05 NZDT (UTC+13)

Highlanders	v	Blues

Forsyth Barr Stadium, Dunedin

20 February 2027
19:35 AEDT (UTC+11)

Waratahs	v	Drua

Allianz Stadium, Sydney

21 February 2027
15:05 AEDT (UTC+11)

Reds	v	Chiefs

Suncorp Stadium, Brisbane

== Round 3 ==
26 February 2027
19:35 NZDT (UTC+13)

Hurricanes	v	Force

Hnry Stadium, Wellington

27 February 2027
15:35 FJT (UTC+12)

Drua	v	Reds

HFC Bank Stadium, Suva (Note: The venues for the Drua's home games weren't yet known at the time the schedule for the 2027 Super Rugby Pacific season was released. On 21 October 2026, the Drua announced the round 3 game against the Reds on 27 February 2027; the round 12 game against the Hurricanes on 30 April 2027; and the round 15 game against the Crusaders on 21 May 2027 would be played at HFC Bank Stadium, Suva.)

27 February 2027
19:05 NZDT (UTC+13)

Chiefs	v	Waratahs

FMG Stadium Waikato, Hamilton

27 February 2027
19:35 AEDT (UTC+11)

Brumbies	v	Highlanders

GIO Stadium, Canberra

28 February 2027
16:00 NZDT (UTC+13)

Blues	v	Crusaders

Eden Park, Auckland

== Round 4 ==
5 March 2027
19:35 NZDT (UTC+13)

Highlanders	v	Force

Rugby Park, Invercargill (Note: The venue for the round 4 match between the Highlanders and the Force on 5 March 2027 wasn't yet known at the time the schedule for the 2027 Super Rugby Pacific season was released. On 1 October 2026, the Highlanders announced the game would be played at Rugby Park, Invercargill.)

5 March 2027
19:45 AEDT (UTC+11)

Waratahs	v	Hurricanes

Allianz Stadium, Sydney

6 March 2027
16:35 NZDT (UTC+13)

Blues	v	Reds

Eden Park, Auckland

6 March 2027
19:05 NZDT (UTC+13)

Crusaders	v	Chiefs

One NZ Stadium, Christchurch

6 March 2027
19:35 AEDT (UTC+11)

Brumbies	v	Drua

GIO Stadium, Canberra

== Round 5 ==
12 March 2027
19:35 NZDT (UTC+13)

Crusaders	v	Highlanders

One NZ Stadium, Christchurch

12 March 2027
18:00 AWST (UTC+8)

Force	v	Reds

HBF Park, Perth

13 March 2027
16:35 NZDT (UTC+13)

Hurricanes	v	Drua

Hnry Stadium, Wellington

13 March 2027
19:05 NZDT (UTC+13)

Chiefs	v	Blues

FMG Stadium Waikato, Hamilton

13 March 2027
19:35 AEDT (UTC+11)

Waratahs	v	Brumbies

Allianz Stadium, Sydney

== Round 6 ==
19 March 2027
19:35 NZDT (UTC+13)

Hurricanes	v	Crusaders

Hnry Stadium, Wellington

19 March 2027
19:45 AEDT (UTC+11)

Brumbies	v	Force

Corroboree Group Oval, Canberra

20 March 2027
15:35 FJT (UTC+12)

Drua	v	Blues

Churchill Park, Lautoka (Note: The venues for the Drua's home games weren't yet known at the time the schedule for the 2027 Super Rugby Pacific season was released. On 21 October 2026, the Drua announced the round 6 game against the Blues on 20 March 2027 and the round 14 game against the Brumbies on 15 May 2027 would be played at Churchill Park, Lautoka.)

20 March 2027
19:05 NZDT (UTC+13)

Highlanders	v	Chiefs

Forsyth Barr Stadium, Dunedin

20 March 2027
18:35 AEDT (UTC+11)

Reds	v	Waratahs

Suncorp Stadium, Brisbane

== Round 7 ==
26 March 2027
19:35 NZDT (UTC+13)

Crusaders	v	Blues

One NZ Stadium, Christchurch

27 March 2027
19:05 NZDT (UTC+13)

Highlanders	v	Brumbies

Forsyth Barr Stadium, Dunedin

27 March 2027
16:35 AWST (UTC+8)

Force	v	Waratahs

HBF Park, Perth

28 March 2027
16:00 NZDT (UTC+13)

Chiefs	v	Hurricanes

Stadium Taranaki, New Plymouth

28 March 2027
15:10 AEDT (UTC+11)

Reds	v	Drua

Suncorp Stadium, Brisbane

== Round 8 – Super Round ==
2 April 2027
19:35 NZDT (UTC+13)

Crusaders	v	Brumbies

One NZ Stadium, Christchurch

3 April 2027
17:05 NZDT (UTC+13)

Chiefs	v	Force

One NZ Stadium, Christchurch

3 April 2027
19:35 NZDT (UTC+13)

Blues	v	Waratahs

One NZ Stadium, Christchurch

4 April 2027
14:00 NZST (UTC+12)

Highlanders	v	Drua

One NZ Stadium, Christchurch

4 April 2027
16:30 NZST (UTC+12)

Hurricanes	v	Reds

One NZ Stadium, Christchurch

== Round 9 ==
9 April 2027
19:35 NZST (UTC+12)

Blues	v	Chiefs

Eden Park, Auckland

10 April 2027
16:35 FJT (UTC+12)

Drua	v	Force

Four R Stadium, Ba

10 April 2027
19:05 NZST (UTC+12)

Hurricanes	v	Highlanders

Hnry Stadium, Wellington

10 April 2027
19:35 AEST (UTC+10)

Brumbies	v	Reds

Corroboree Group Oval, Canberra

11 April 2027
14:00 AEST (UTC+10)

Waratahs	v	Crusaders

Allianz Stadium, Sydney

== Round 10 ==
16 April 2027
19:35 NZST (UTC+12)

Chiefs	v	Drua

FMG Stadium Waikato, Hamilton

16 April 2027
19:45 AEST (UTC+10)

Brumbies	v	Hurricanes

GIO Stadium, Canberra

17 April 2027
19:05 NZST (UTC+12)

Highlanders	v	Waratahs

Forsyth Barr Stadium, Dunedin (Note: The venue for the round 10 match between the Highlanders and the Waratahs on 17 April 2027 wasn't yet known at the time the schedule for the 2027 Super Rugby Pacific season was released. On 1 October 2026, the Highlanders announced the game would be played at Forsyth Barr Stadium, Dunedin.)

17 April 2027
17:35 AWST (UTC+7)

Force	v	Crusaders

HBF Park, Perth

Bye/s: Blues, Reds

== Round 11 – ANZAC Round ==
24 April 2027
19:35 AEST (UTC+11)

Reds	v	Blues

Suncorp Stadium, Brisbane

Bye/s: Chiefs, Crusaders, Brumbies, Waratahs, Highlanders, Hurricanes, Chiefs, Drua

== Round 12 ==
30 April 2027
19:30 FJT (UTC+12)

Drua	v	Hurricanes

HFC Bank Stadium, Suva

1 May 2027
16:35 NZST (UTC+12)

Chiefs	v	Crusaders

FMG Stadium Waikato, Hamilton

1 May 2027
19:05 NZST (UTC+12)

Blues	v	Brumbies

Eden Park, Auckland

1 May 2027
19:35 AEST (UTC+10)

Reds	v	Highlanders

Suncorp Stadium, Brisbane

2 May 2027
TBC AEST (UTC+10)

Waratahs	v	Force

Allianz Stadium, Sydney

== Round 13 ==
7 May 2027
19:35 NZST (UTC+12)

Blues	v	Drua

Eden Park, Auckland

7 May 2027
19:45 AEST (UTC+10)

Brumbies	v	Crusaders

GIO Stadium, Canberra

8 May 2027
19:05 NZST (UTC+12)

Hurricanes	v	Chiefs

McLean Park, Napier (Note: The venue for the round 13 match between the Hurricanes and the Chiefs on 8 May 2027 wasn't yet known at the time the schedule for the 2027 Super Rugby Pacific season was released. On 30 October 2026, the Hurricanes announced the game would be played at McLean Park, Napier.)

8 May 2027
19:35 AEST (UTC+10)

Waratahs	v	Reds

Allianz Stadium, Sydney

9 May 2027
14:05 AWST (UTC+7)

Force	v	Highlanders

HBF Park, Perth

== Round 14 ==
14 May 2027
19:35 NZST (UTC+12)

Chiefs	v	Reds

FMG Stadium Waikato, Hamilton

15 May 2027
16:35 FJT (UTC+12)

Drua	v	Brumbies

Churchill Park, Lautoka

15 May 2027
19:05 NZST (UTC+12)

Crusaders	v	Waratahs

One NZ Stadium, Christchurch

15 May 2027
17:35 AWST (UTC+7)

Force	v	Blues

HBF Park, Perth

16 May 2027
16:00 NZST (UTC+12)

Highlanders	v	Hurricanes

Forsyth Barr Stadium, Dunedin

== Round 15 ==
21 May 2027
19:35 FJT (UTC+12)

Drua	v	Crusaders

HFC Bank Stadium, Suva

21 May 2027
19:45 AEST (UTC+10)

Reds	v	Force

Suncorp Stadium, Brisbane

22 May 2027
16:35 NZST (UTC+12)

Chiefs	v	Highlanders

FMG Stadium Waikato, Hamilton

22 May 2027
19:05 NZST (UTC+12)

Hurricanes	v	Brumbies

Hnry Stadium, Wellington

22 May 2027
19:35 AEST (UTC+10)

Waratahs	v	Blues

Allianz Stadium, Sydney

== Round 16 ==
28 May 2027
19:35 NZST (UTC+12)

Crusaders	v	Force

One NZ Stadium, Christchurch

28 May 2027
19:45 AEST (UTC+10)

Brumbies	v	Chiefs

GIO Stadium, Canberra

29 May 2027
16:35 FJT (UTC+12)

Drua	v	Waratahs

Four R Stadium, Ba

29 May 2027
19:05 NZST (UTC+12)

Blues	v	Highlanders

Eden Park, Auckland

29 May 2027
19:35 AEST (UTC+10)

Reds	v	Hurricanes

Suncorp Stadium, Brisbane

== Round 17 ==
4 June 2027
19:35 NZST (UTC+12)

Hurricanes	v	Blues

Hnry Stadium, Wellington

4 June 2027
19:45 AEST (UTC+10)

Reds	v	Brumbies

Suncorp Stadium, Brisbane

4 June 2027
19:55 AWST (UTC+7)

Force	v	Drua

HBF Park, Perth

5 June 2027
19:05 NZST (UTC+12)

Highlanders	v	Crusaders

Forsyth Barr Stadium, Dunedin

5 June 2027
19:35 AEST (UTC+10)

Waratahs	v	Chiefs

Allianz Stadium, Sydney

== See also ==
- 2027 Super Rugby Pacific season
- List of 2026 Super Rugby Pacific matches
