= Tom Allen (rugby union) =

New Zealand rugby union player (born 2004)

- Full name: Tom G. Allen
- Born: 23 July 2004 (age 22) Hastings, New Zealand
- Height: 197 cm (6 ft 6 in)
- Weight: 114 kg (251 lb; 17 st 13 lb)
- School: Hastings Boys' High School
- Notable relative: Reuben Allen (twin-brother)

Rugby union career
- Position: Lock
- Current team: Hawke's Bay, Hurricanes
Senior career
| Years | Team | Apps | (Points) |
| 2023– | Hawke's Bay | 1 | (0) |
| 2025– | Hurricanes | 2 | (0) |
| 2025 | Auckland | 6 | (0) |
- Correct as of 9 July 2026
International career
| Years | Team | Apps | (Points) |
| 2023–2024 | New Zealand U20 | 14 | (5) |
- Correct as of 10 November 2024

Tom Allen (born 23 July 2004) is a New Zealand rugby union player, who currently plays as a lock for Auckland in New Zealand's domestic National Provincial Championship competition and the Hurricanes in Super Rugby.

== Early career ==
Allen attended Hastings Boys' High School and played 1st XV rugby for the school, alongside his twin brother, Reuben Allen. Since finishing his secondary school education, he has played premier club rugby for Havelock North Rugby Club.

Allen represented Hawke's Bay at age grade level, including the Hawke's Bay U18 team in 2022 and the U19 team in 2023, and was part of the Hawke's Bay Academy.

In September 2022, Allen was selected in the Hurricanes U18 squad for a Super Rugby Development Camp. Half a year later, he was named in the Hurricanes U20 team for the Super Rugby U20 competition in Taupō. The Hurricanes U20s finished the 2023 tournament in second place.

== Senior career ==
=== Hawke’s Bay ===
At only 19 years old, Allen was named in the Hawke's Bay squad for the 2023 Bunnings NPC season. He made his debut for the Magpies on 16 August 2023 against Waikato. That was his only game for the province in two seasons. He was again named in the squad for 2024, but didn't get any game time that season.

=== Hurricanes ===
In March 2024, he was for the second year named in the Hurricanes U20 squad for the Super Rugby U20s tournament. The team ended the 2024 tournament in third place.

Prior to and during the 2024 Super Rugby Pacific season, Allen trained with the Hurricanes while on a National Development Contract. On 27 June 2024, the Hurricanes announced that the franchise had signed Allen until the end of 2026 on a full contract.

Allen made his Super Rugby debut for the Hurricanes on 23 May 2026 in their round 15 game against the Highlanders. Four weeks later he became a Super Rugby champion when the Hurricanes defeated the Chiefs 60–5 in the 2026 Super Rugby Pacific final, although he didn't play in that game.

=== Loan to Auckland ===
On 21 July 2025, Allen was named in the Auckland squad for the 2025 Bunnings NPC season, on loan from Hawke's Bay. He made his debut for Auckland – via the bench – on 31 July 2025 against Waikato.

=== Scarlets ===
Allen signed for the Scarlets on 16 July 2026. He made his debut on 31 October 2026, against the Bulls.

== International career ==
On 7 October 2022, Allen was named in the New Zealand Schools squad for two matches – against the NZ Māori U18 team and Fiji Schools – to be played at a New Zealand Under 18 Quadrangular Tournament in Hamilton.

The following year, Allen was for the first time named in the New Zealand Under 20 team. He played in both games of a two-test series against Australia and competed at the 2023 World Rugby U20 Championship.

In 2024, Allen was selected in the New Zealand Under 20 team again, winning the inaugural U20 Rugby Championship and finishing the 2024 World Rugby U20 Championship in third place.

== Personal life ==
Allen has a twin brother, Reuben, who also plays rugby as a lock. They played against each other for the first time during the 2026 Hilux NPC.
