= 2015 Super Rugby final =

Men's rugby union club competition

2015 Super Rugby Final
- Event: 2015 Super Rugby season
Hurricanes	Highlanders
(New Zealand)	(New Zealand)
14	21
- Date: 4 July 2015
- Venue: Westpac Stadium, Wellington
- Referee: Jaco Peyper (South Africa)
- Attendance: 36,000

The 2015 Super Rugby Final, was played between the Hurricanes and the Highlanders. It was the 20th final in the Super Rugby competition's history and the fifth under the expanded 15-team format. This was the first Super Rugby final between two New Zealand teams since 2006 when the Hurricanes were beaten by the Crusaders.

The match was won by the Highlanders who beat the Hurricanes by seven points. Upon winning the match, the Highlanders became the first team to win the competition having failed to win a conference. They also became the first team to win the competition having played in the qualifiers round. It was the Highlanders first Grand Final appearance since 1999, and the Hurricanes first Grand Final appearance since 2006.

In New Zealand, 583,620 people tuned in to watch

== Road to the Final ==
Finals Series qualifying teams
Conference leaders
Pos	Team	W	D	L	PD	BP	Pts
1	(New Zealand) Hurricanes	14	0	2	+170	10	66
2	(Australia) Waratahs	11	0	5	+96	8	52
3	(South Africa) Stormers	10	1	5	+50	3	45
Wildcard teams
4	(New Zealand) Highlanders	11	0	5	+117	9	53
5	(New Zealand) Chiefs	10	0	6	+73	8	48
6	(Australia) Brumbies	9	0	7	+108	11	47
Source: SANZAR

The 2015 Super Rugby competition involved fifteen teams, five each from South Africa, Australia and New Zealand. The 2015 season was the fifth year of an expanded 15 team format (12 teams competed between 1996 and 2005, before increasing to 14 between 2006 and 2010).

The competition began on 13 February with the regular season consisting of 120 matches over eighteen weeks. Each team played the others from their own conference (both home and away), plus four out of five teams from the other two countries (two at home and two away in each case). The top six teams after the regular season advanced to the finals.

The Hurricanes finished top of the New Zealand conference and topped the overall standings, with fourteen wins and just two losses during the season (one being to the Australian conference winner, the Waratahs). The South African conference winner was the Stormers, and the three wildcard teams making the playoffs were the Highlanders, Chiefs, and Brumbies.

The play-off fixtures were as follows:

First round
20 June 2015
3	(South Africa) Stormers	19
6	(Australia) Brumbies	39
20 June 2015
4	(New Zealand) Highlanders	24
5	(New Zealand) Chiefs	14

Semifinals
27 June 2015
1	(New Zealand) Hurricanes	29
6	(Australia) Brumbies	9
27 June 2015
2	(Australia) Waratahs	17
4	(New Zealand) Highlanders	35

Final
4 July 2015
(New Zealand) Hurricanes	14
(New Zealand) Highlanders	21

=== Qualifiers ===
20 June 2015	Highlanders	24–14	Chiefs	Forsyth Barr Stadium, Dunedin
19:35	Try: Waisake Naholo 24', 43'; Con: Lima Sopoaga 44' (1/2); Pen: Lima Sopoaga 6', 57', 66', 80' (4/4); Drop: Waisake Naholo (0/1)	Report; Scoreboard	Try: Brodie Retallick 60'; Con: Andrew Horrell (0/1); Pen: Andrew Horrell 8', 28', 40' (3/5)	Attendance: 22,500; Referee: Chris Pollock

20 June 2015	Stormers	19–39	Brumbies	Newlands Stadium, Cape Town
17:05	Try: Cheslin Kolbe 45'; Con: Demetri Catrakilis 46' (1/1); Pen: Demetri Catrakilis 13', 34', 49', 60' (4/4)	Report; Scoreboard	Try: Joe Tomane 4', 15', 25'; Scott Sio 40'; Ita Vaea 63'; Jesse Mogg 79'; Con: Christian Lealiifano 26', 40', 64' (3/6); Pen: Christian Lealiifano 51' (1/1); Cards: Henry Speight (red card) 74'; Scott Fardy (yellow card) 75'	Referee: Jaco Peyper

=== Semi-finals ===
27 June 2015	Hurricanes	29–9	Brumbies	Westpac Stadium, Wellington
19:35	Try: Julian Savea 21'; TJ Perenara 28'; Ardie Savea 43'; Matt Proctor 74'; Con: Beauden Barrett 29' (1/2); James Marshall 44', 75' (2/2); Pen: Beauden Barrett (0/1); James Marshall 66' (1/2)	Report; Scoreboard	Pen: Jesse Mogg 40' (1/1); Christian Lealiifano 50', 57' (2/2)	Attendance: 34,500; Referee: Glen Jackson

27 June 2015	Waratahs	17–35	Highlanders	Allianz Stadium, Sydney
19:55	Try: Rob Horne 11'; Con: Bernard Foley (0/1); Pen: Bernard Foley 23', 31', 37', 51' (4/4); Cards: Jacques Potgieter (yellow card) 58' to 68'	Report; Scoreboard	Try: Aaron Smith 19'; Richard Buckman 33'; Waisake Naholo 53' penalty try 58'; Patrick Osborne 78'; Con: Ben Smith (0/1); Lima Sopoaga 34', 59' (2/4); Pen: Lima Sopoaga 5' (1/3); Drop: Lima Sopoaga 75' (1/2)	Attendance: 32,632; Referee: Craig Joubert

== Final ==
4 July 2015
19:35

Hurricanes	14–21	Highlanders
Try: Ma'a Nonu 36'; Con: Beauden Barrett (0/1); Pen: Beauden Barrett 42', 54', 67' (3/5)	Report; Scoreboard	Try: Elliot Dixon 40'; Waisake Naholo 47'; Con: Lima Sopoaga 40' (1/2); Pen: Lima Sopoaga 5', 29' (2/3); Drop: Lima Sopoaga (0/1); Marty Banks 78' (1/1)

Westpac Stadium, Wellington
Attendance: 35,896
Referee: Jaco Peyper

Hurricanes	Highlanders

Preceded by 2014 Super Rugby Final	Super Rugby Final; 2015	Succeeded by 2016 Super Rugby Final
