= Scott Hansen =

Scott Hansen may refer to:

- Scott Hansen (racing driver) (born 1955), American stock car driver
- Scott Hansen (rugby union) (born 1976), New Zealand rugby union player and coach
- Scott Hansen (born 1977), birth name of musician Tycho
