= Johnny Falloon =

New Zealand rugby union player

- Born: 31 May 2006 (age 20) Wellington, New Zealand
- Height: 200 cm (6 ft 7 in)
- Weight: 113 kg (249 lb; 17 st 11 lb)
- School: Rathkeale College

Rugby union career
- Position: Lock
- Current team: Hurricanes / Wellington
Senior career
Years	Team	Apps	(Points)
2025–	Wellington	9	(0)
2027–	Hurricanes	0	(0)
- Correct as of 8 November 2026
International career
Years	Team	Apps	(Points)
2026	New Zealand U20	5	(5)
- Correct as of 8 November 2026

Johnny Falloon (born 31 May 2006) is a New Zealand rugby union player, who plays for the Hurricanes. His preferred position is lock.

== Early career ==
Falloon was born in the Wellington area and attended Rathkeale College. His school performances earned him selection for New Zealand Schools in 2024, and earned him a place in the Hurricanes academy, representing their U20 side in 2025. In 2026, he was named in the New Zealand U20 side. He plays his club rugby for Old Boys University.

== Professional career ==
Falloon has represented Wellington in the National Provincial Championship since 2025, being named in their squad for the 2026 Hilux NPC competition. In October 2026, he was named in the Hurricanes wider training group for the 2027 Super Rugby Pacific season.
