= Tony Gilbert (rugby union) =

Anthony W Gilbert (born 1944 or 1945), usually known as Tony Gilbert, is a New Zealand rugby union coach.

Gilbert, formerly a school principal, began coaching club sides, taking several to local championships, before being chosen to coach the Otago team in the National Provincial Championship and the Highlanders in SuperRugby in 1998. Otago won that year's NPC, with the Highlanders reaching the semi-finals of the SuperRugby competition, leading to Gilbert being named as New Zealand coach of the year. Gilbert took the Highlanders to the final of the 1999 competition.

As a result of these successes, Gilbert was appointed as assistant coach (under Wayne Smith) in 1999 to the national rugby team, the All Blacks, a position he held until 2001. He also acted as coach to the New Zealand Colts during the 1999 season.

Gilbert moved to Scotland and coached Border Reivers until 2003, before returning to New Zealand. He was Otago director of rugby until 2006, and returned in 2009 as the side's non-coaching manager.
