= Reuben Allen =

New Zealand rugby union player

- Born: 23 July 2004 (age 22) Hastings, New Zealand
- Height: 196 cm (6 ft 5 in)
- Weight: 112 kg (247 lb; 17 st 9 lb)
- School: Hastings Boys' High School
- Notable relative: Tom Allen (twin-brother)

Rugby union career
- Position: Lock
- Current team: Highlanders / Manawatu
Senior career
Years	Team	Apps	(Points)
2025–	Manawatu	14	(0)
2027–	Highlanders	0	(0)
- Correct as of 8 November 2026

Reuben Allen (born 23 July 2004) is a New Zealand rugby union player, who plays for the Highlanders. His preferred position is lock.

== Early career ==
Allen was born in Hastings and attended Hastings Boys' High School. His school performances earned him a place in the Hurricanes academy, representing their U20 side in 2024. In 2025, he represented the New Zealand Barbarians U21 side. He played his club rugby for Havelock North before transferring to Feilding. He is the twin-brother of fellow rugby union player Tom Allen.

== Professional career ==
Allen has represented Manawatu in the National Provincial Championship since 2025, being named in their squad for the 2026 Hilux NPC competition. In October 2026, he was named in the Highlanders wider training group for the 2027 Super Rugby Pacific season.
