= Phoenix Abbott =

New Zealand rugby union player

- Born: 27 October 2004 (age 22) Christchurch, New Zealand
- School: John McGlashan College
- University: Lincoln University

Rugby union career
- Position: Flanker
- Current team: Highlanders / Canterbury
Senior career
Years	Team	Apps	(Points)
2026–	Canterbury	4	(0)
2027–	Highlanders	0	(0)
- Correct as of 8 November 2026

Phoenix Abbott (born 27 October 2004) is a New Zealand rugby union player, who plays for the Highlanders. His preferred position is flanker.

== Early career ==
Abbott was born in Christchurch and attended John McGlashan College. After leaving school, he attended Lincoln University where he played for their rugby team. His performances earned him selection for the Canterbury B side, winning their player of the year award in 2026.

== Professional career ==
Abbott has represented Canterbury in the National Provincial Championship since 2026, being named as an additional player in their squad for the 2026 Hilux NPC competition. In October 2026, he was named in the Highlanders wider training group for the 2027 Super Rugby Pacific season.
