= Daylight saving time in Fiji =

Daylight saving time in Fiji in 2009 started on 29 November and ended on 26 April 2010.

For the 2010-2011 summer, DST started on the fourth Sunday in October and ended on the last Sunday in March. and from 2022 third Sunday in November to third Sunday in January. In 2012, the end of DST was adjusted to be the fourth Sunday in January, and in 2014 the start of DST was adjusted to be the first Sunday in November. In 2021 the Fiji government announced that Fiji would not observe daylight saving time in 2021–22.

Fiji does not currently observe Daylight saving time, observing Fiji Time all year.

== See also ==
- Time in Fiji
