= Sione Lauaki =

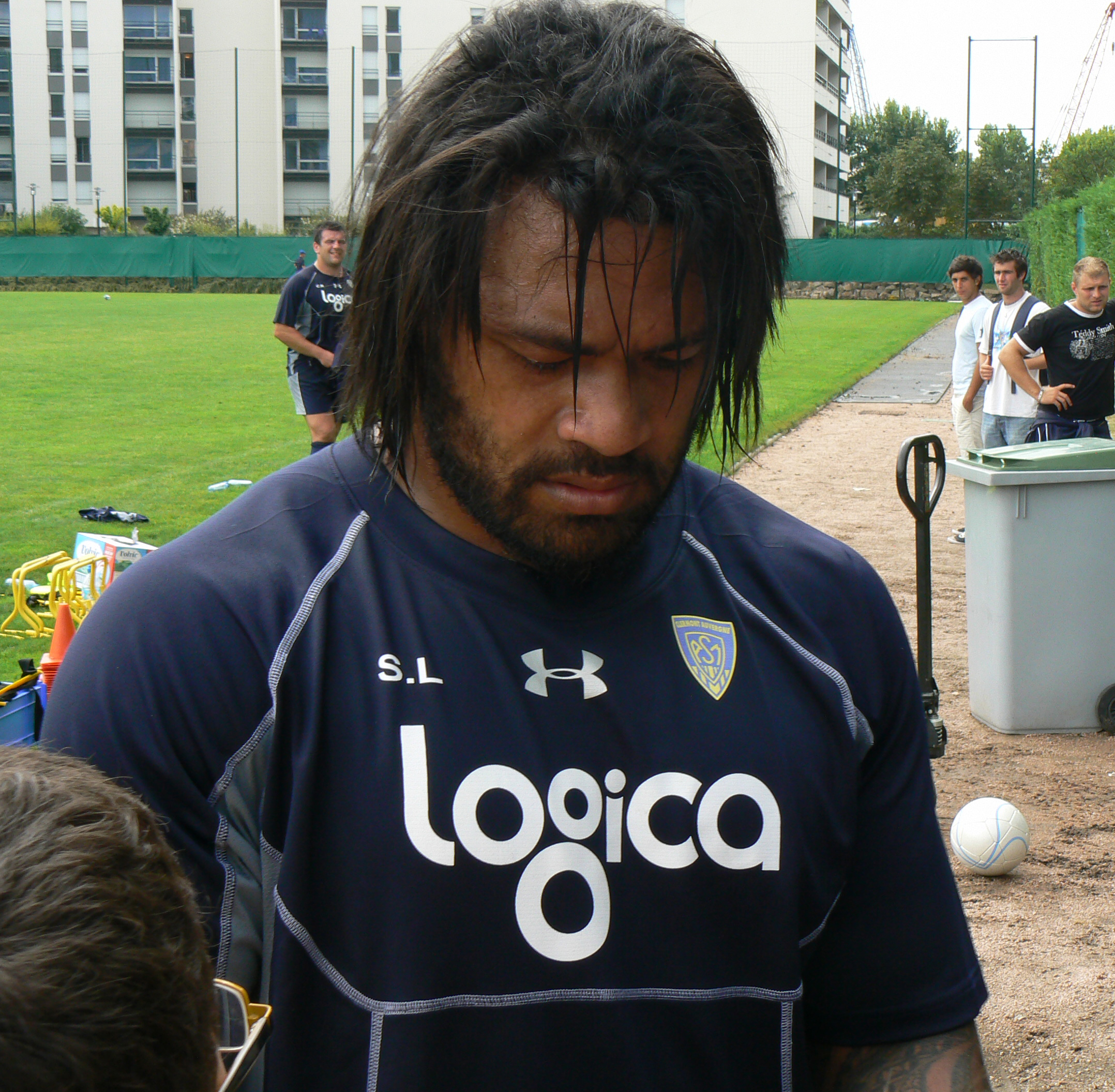
- Born: Sione Tuitupu Lauaki; 22 June 1981 Haʻapai, Tonga
- Died: 12 February 2017 (aged 35) Auckland, New Zealand
- Height: 1.94 m (6 ft 4 in)
- Weight: 115 kg (254 lb; 18 st 2 lb)
- School: Waitakere College; Kelston Boys' High School
- Notable relative(s): Epalahame Lauaki (brother); Senita Lauaki (brother)

Rugby union career
- Position(s): Flanker, Number 8
Senior career
Years	Team	Apps	(Points)
2010–11	Clermont	51	(10)
2011–12	Bayonne	16	(5)
Provincial / State sides
Years	Team	Apps	(Points)
2002–04	Auckland	24	(15)
2005	Waikato	21	(25)
Super Rugby
Years	Team	Apps	(Points)
2004–10	Chiefs	70	(70)
International career
Years	Team	Apps	(Points)
2004	Pacific Islanders	3	(15)
2005–2008	New Zealand	17	(15)

Sione Tuitupu Lauaki (22 June 1981 – 12 February 2017) was a Tongan-born New Zealand rugby union footballer who played for Bayonne. He previously played for the New Zealand national team, the All Blacks. His brother, Epalahame Lauaki, is a 2nd row rugby league footballer previously playing for Auckland Warriors in the NRL competition.

== Early career ==
He attended Waitakere College in Auckland where he made the first XV in 1998. He later moved to Kelston Boys High School, where he also played in the first XV. He played his club rugby for Waitemata Rugby Football and Sports Club and was instrumental in their Gallaher Shield win in 2003. He was the fourth All Black to come from the Waitemata club after Adrian Clarke, Ken Carrington and Michael Jones.

== Professional career ==
=== Pacific Islanders ===
While playing for the combined Pacific Islanders team in 2004 he scored test match tries against Australia, New Zealand and South Africa. He was one of the two Pacific Islanders rugby union team players picked for the All Blacks, the other being winger, Sitiveni Sivivatu.

=== All Blacks ===
He has played loose forward for the All Blacks, with whom he made his debut in 2005 against Fiji. His final match for New Zealand was in 2008 against Samoa. During his time with the All Blacks he was capped 17 times and scored three tries.

=== Super 14 ===
In Super Rugby he played for the Chiefs. He racked up 70 caps for the team, having scored 14 tries during his Super Rugby career. Lauaki went on to play for ASM Clermont Auvergne at the start of the 2010–11 Top 14 season. He later moved to Aviron Bayonnais. In February 2012 during routine tests, Lauaki was diagnosed with renal failure and cardiovascular problems. As a result, the club signed him off for the rest of the season.

== Death ==
Lauaki died on 12 February 2017, aged 35, due to heart and kidney problems.
