= Hurricanes (rugby union) =

New Zealand rugby union club, based in Wellington

- Union: New Zealand Rugby Union
- Nickname: The 'Canes
- Founded: 1996; 30 years ago
- Location: Wellington, New Zealand; Manawatū-Whanganui, New Zealand; Hawke's Bay, New Zealand; Gisborne, New Zealand
- Region: Hawke's Bay; Horowhenua Kapiti; Manawatū; Poverty Bay; Wairarapa-Bush; Whanganui; Wellington
- Ground: Hnry Stadium (Capacity: 34,500)
- Coach: Clark Laidlaw
- Captain: TBA
- Most caps: TJ Perenara (162)
- Top scorer: Beauden Barrett (1,238)
- Most tries: TJ Perenara (65)
- League: Super Rugby Pacific
- 2026: 1st overall Playoffs: Champions
| Team kit | 2nd kit |

Official website
- www.hurricanes.co.nz

The Hurricanes (/ˈhʌrɪkeɪnz/ HURR-ik-aynz; Māori: Hau Āwhiowhio; formerly the Wellington Hurricanes) is a New Zealand professional men's rugby union team based in Wellington that competes in Super Rugby. The Hurricanes were formed to represent the lower North Island, including the East Coast, Hawke's Bay, Horowhenua Kapiti, Manawatū, Poverty Bay, Taranaki, Wairarapa-Bush, Wanganui and Wellington unions. They currently play at Hnry Stadium (formerly named Sky Stadium), having previously played at the now-defunct Athletic Park. The Hurricanes have featured some of New Zealand's most notable rugby players, including Jonah Lomu, Christian Cullen, Tana Umaga, Beauden Barrett and Ardie Savea.

The Hurricanes had a poor first season in 1996's Super 12, but rebounded in 1997 with a third placing. The team did not reach the play-offs for another five years as they struggled in the bottom four of the table. Since 2003 the Hurricanes have made the post-season play-offs fourteen times, including the 2006 final, which they lost in foggy weather against the Crusaders 19–12. After hosting but failing to win the final in 2015, the 2016 season brought the Hurricanes' first-ever title, winning the final 20-3 against the Lions. The Hurricanes finished top of the regular-season table in 2024 and 2026, winning their second title with a 60-5 victory over the Chiefs in 2026.

== History ==
=== Early years: 1996–1997 ===
The Hurricanes were formed in 1996 as one of five New Zealand Super 12 teams, and were originally called the Wellington Hurricanes. The team's first coach was former All Black Frank Oliver, while Bull Allen was named as captain. Their first match, played at Palmerston North Showgrounds against the Auckland Blues, was the first ever Super 12 match. They lost it 36–28. The team performed below expectations in the inaugural year of the competition and finished ninth. In 1997 the team made the semi-finals, losing in Canberra to the ACT Brumbies. However the consistent form shown during this season would not be seen again for many years.

=== Expect the unexpected: 1998–2002 ===
Following their 1997 season, the Hurricanes failed to qualify for the semi-finals until 2003. Despite this, they were still known for the attacking nature of their backline that included the All Blacks stars Tana Umaga and Christian Cullen. The team played with flair and could score at any moment, whatever their position on the field, giving rise to the teams catch cry of 'expect the unexpected'. However the team struggled for consistent performances and at crunch time in matches, leading to patchy form and results.

After the 1999 World Cup, Jonah Lomu's contract with the NZRU expired he was linked to many clubs around the world, in rugby league as well as union and also the NFL's Dallas Cowboys. On 23 November 1999 it was announced that the winger had re-signed with the NZRU and agreed terms with the Wellington Rugby Union, despite a reported £1.1 million offer by Bristol. The move to the Wellington union meant he could be included in the protected group of players for the Hurricanes.

The Hurricanes also opened 2000 with a new stadium. The highlights of that year included the victory over eventual champions the Crusaders, 41–29, in front of a packed house. At the end of the season the Hurricanes still had a chance of making the semis and only had to beat the Bulls to stay in contention. However, the Hurricanes played one of their worst games of the year, losing the match to one of the worst performing teams at that point in the competition's history and lost the possibility of qualifying for the semi-finals. The team finished eighth on the table.

Despite the Wellington Lions (whom most of the Hurricanes squad were chosen from) winning the 2000 NPC, the Hurricanes finished ninth in the final standings in 2001; one worse than the year before. Another ninth placing in 2002 resulted in Graham Mourie, who had led the team since 2000, resigning.

=== New era: since 2003 ===
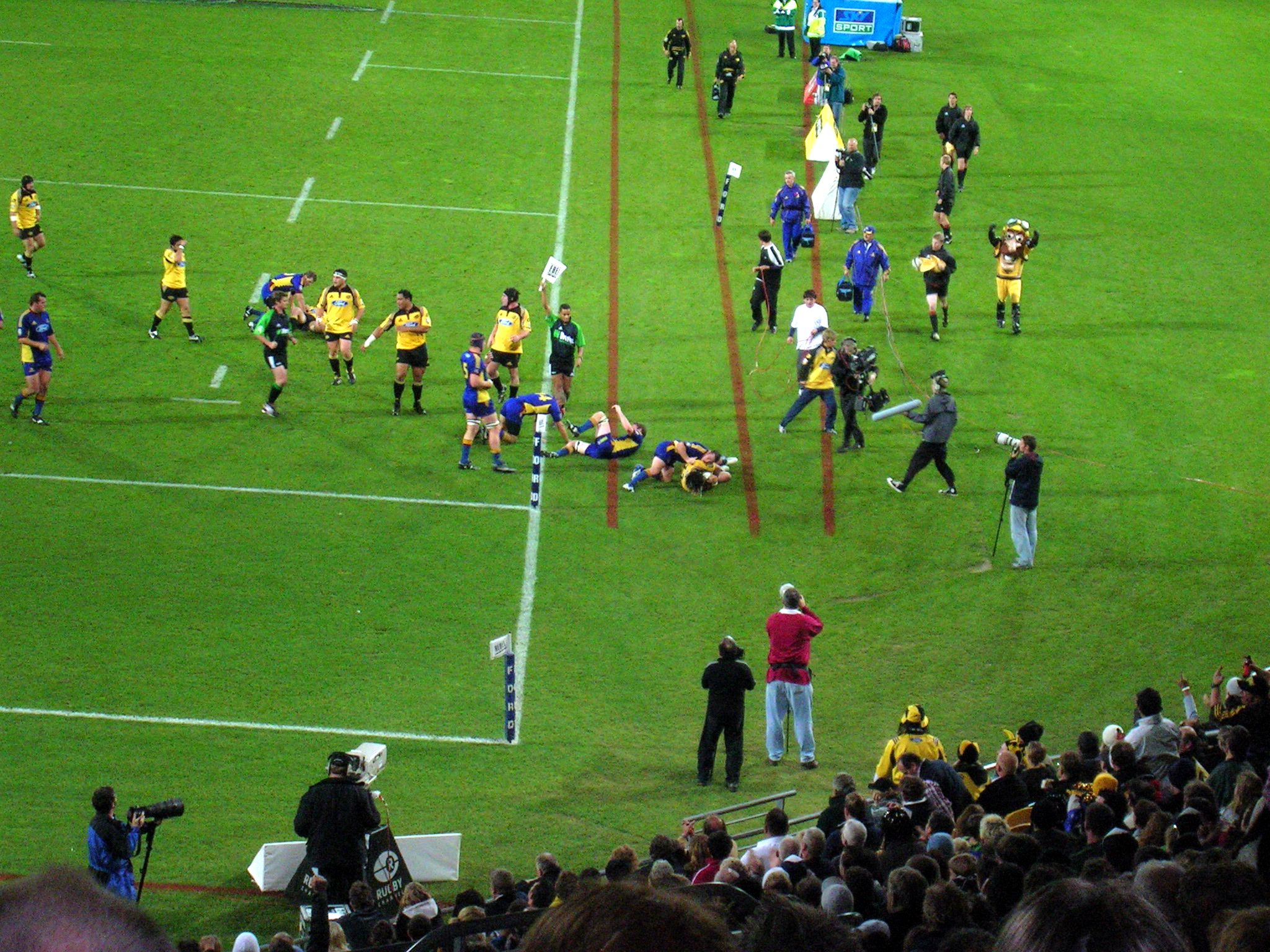
The Hurricanes playing the Highlanders at Wellington Regional Stadium in 2006

In spite of reports that Colin Cooper, the then Crusaders assistant-coach, had said he was "not yet ready to jump ship" and wanted to stay with the South Island franchise, the Hurricanes were able to lure him away from the champions and made him their head coach for the 2003 season.

Cooper, along with newly appointed captain Tana Umaga, helped to mould the inconsistent and ill-disciplined Hurricanes into one of the top teams in the competition. 2003 was the beginning of a new era for the Hurricanes as they reached the semi-finals for just the second time in their history on the back of a strong seven-game winning streak mid-season. Their success came partly with the break-out year for mid-fielder Ma'a Nonu, his strong performances and partnership with captain Tana Umaga pushed out former All Black Pita Alatini and saw him score six tries en route to the All Black squad. The team also benefited from the steady hand of David Holwell at first five-eighth and an improving and mobile forward pack. Hurricanes stalwart Christian Cullen would leave New Zealand shores for Irish club Munster after his omission from the All Blacks 2003 World Cup squad, despite scoring eight tries during the season.

All Black great Jonah Lomu was left out of the 2004 squad, due to a life-threatening illness that would eventually result in a kidney transplant. He would never again play for the Hurricanes.

The majority of the team was retained for 2005. including new centre Conrad Smith. The Hurricanes came back in 2005 to the form that saw them make the playoffs two years prior. Former New Zealand Colt Flyhalf Jimmy Gopperth was the real "find" of the season, scoring 139 points, which helped offset the departure of David Holwell to Ireland. The Hurricanes had tried to sign Australian playmaker Brock James, who had starred the previous NPC season for Taranaki and the Blues, and young star Luke McAlister indicated that he would like to play in Wellington. With both Daniel Carter and Aaron Mauger at the Crusaders capable of playing first five-eighth the team also made an attempt to lure Andrew Mehrtens to Wellington, without success.

In 2006 two new teams entered the competition, the Bloemfontein-based Cheetahs from South Africa and the Perth-based Western Force from Australia, creating the Super 14. Rodney So'oialo was appointed captain of the Hurricanes to succeed former All Black captain Tana Umaga. The team won all but four matches. They made their first Super Rugby final but lost to the Crusaders in a match played under thick fog. Following the match there was an incident in a nightclub involving Chris Masoe and Tana Umaga. The club finances benefitted from on-pitch success, with NZ$1.36 million profit on its 2006 turnover of NZ$7.44 million.

The Hurricanes returned to the semi-finals in both 2008 and 2009, however were unable to capture the same success in subsequent seasons. 2011 saw the arrival of Mark Hammett as coach and the departure of Andrew Hore, Ma'a Nonu and Piri Weepu.

The Hurricanes finished 11th in the 2013 Super Rugby season.

2015 saw the Hurricanes finish first in the regular season, topping the table with 66 points and a win–loss record of 14–2 in round robin play. The Hurricanes picked up the New Zealand Conference trophy after beating the Highlanders. After beating the Brumbies in the semi-final, the Hurricanes lost the final against the Highlanders 21–14. It was the final Super Rugby match for Conrad Smith, Ma'a Nonu and Jeremy Thrush – all Hurricanes that have played over 100 caps.

On 8 December 2015, Rugby World Cup-winning hooker Dane Coles was named captain for the 2016 season. Rugby World Cup-winning halfback TJ Perenara was named as vice-captain.

2016 was a big year for the Hurricanes finishing first overall on the points table, despite sitting in 7th going into the final round of the regular season. This saw them go into the quarter-finals against the Sharks winning 41–0 at Wellington Regional Stadium. They carried on to the semi-finals playing the Chiefs and winning 25–9 at Wellington Regional Stadium. The Hurricanes played the Lions in the final, winning the game 20–3 at Wellington Regional Stadium. This was the first time in Super Rugby history that the Hurricanes won the title. It was Victor Vito's final and 100th game for the Hurricanes.

The Hurricanes looked to win another championship title in 2017, taking out 12 of 15 games and making it to the quarter-finals against the Brumbies, which the Hurricanes won 16–35. However, in the semi-finals they were defeated by the Lions, who they defeated in the 2016 final.

In 2018, the Hurricanes won 11 of 16 round robin matches, which put them into the quarter-finals against a very tough Chiefs side. The Hurricanes narrowly defeated the Chiefs 32–31. But once again, the Hurricanes failed to make it past the semi-finals, losing to the Crusaders 30–12.

2019 saw the Hurricanes win 12, draw 1 and lose 3. This result took them to the quarter-finals and they faced the Bulls, which was tight but the Hurricanes won 35–28. Unfortunately, the Hurricanes lost to the Crusaders again in a tight battle in Christchurch (30–26).

After 7 rounds of 2020, the Hurricanes finished 3rd in the NZ conference and 6th overall. The competition was suspended after 7 rounds due to the COVID-19 pandemic. However, a domestic Super Rugby competition was formed in New Zealand called Super Rugby Aotearoa, which kicked off in June 2020. The Hurricanes finished 3rd overall, winning 5 and losing 3. A notable moment from the Hurricanes in Super Rugby Aotearoa 2020 was that they ended the Crusaders' 18 match home winning streak, defeating them 32–34 in Round 7.

Super Rugby Aotearoa 2021 hasn't been so fortunate to the Hurricanes. They have only won one match, which was a 30–19 victory over the Highlanders in Dunedin.

== Home Grounds and Franchise Area ==

=== Grounds ===
The Hurricanes play the majority of their home matches at the 34,500 capacity Hnry Stadium (formerly named Sky Stadium) on Wellington's waterfront. The stadium is affectionately known as The Cake-Tin due to its distinctive shape. It was opened in 2000 to replace Athletic Park, where the team had been previously based.

Central Energy Trust Arena in Palmerston North and McLean Park in Napier have also played host to Hurricanes home matches. In the initial years of the competition, the Hurricanes played once or occasionally twice, away from their Wellington base depending on whether they had five or six home games per year. However, in recent years, the team has seldom ventured from Hnry Stadium, playing at-most one match per year in Palmerston North or Napier.

| Wellington | Palmerston North | Napier |
|---|---|---|
| Hnry Stadium | Central Energy Trust Arena | McLean Park |
| Capacity: 40,000 | Capacity: 15,000 | Capacity: 22,000 |

=== Region ===
The team represents the Poverty Bay, Hawke's Bay, Wanganui, Manawatu, Wairarapa-Bush, Horowhenua-Kapiti and Wellington unions. In 2013, Taranaki severed its ties with the club, signing its allegiance to the Chiefs in the hope of attracting Chiefs home matches to New Plymouth. On 7 February 2025, the Chiefs announced that also East Coast had changed its provincial affiliation from the Hurricanes to the Chiefs.

== Ownership and Finances ==
In 2012, it was announced that a new company, Hurricanes Investment Ltd Partnership, had purchased a licence from the NZRU to operate the club.

While the NZRU retains ownership of the team, as well as control of the contracts of the players and head coach, the licensee is responsible for overseeing day-to-day operations. Hurricanes Investment Ltd Partnership is a joint venture between the Wellington Rugby Football Union owning 50 per cent of shares with the remaining 50 per cent held by a consortium of private investors, led by noted economist and author Gareth Morgan. In July 2013, it was announced that the Horowhenua-Kapiti Rugby Football Union had purchased a 3 per cent stake in the company Hurricanes' Investment Ltd Partnership, with $100,000 contributed towards the company.

On 8 December 2025, it was announced that a joint venture of NZ Sport Investment (NZSI) between Property Developer Malcolm Gillies and Porirua's Summit Capital had purchased the 50% share that Wellington Rugby Football Union had in the franchise. NZR had also supplied both the Hurricanes and WRFU with a small temporary investment loan as have had done previously with other clubs. Other already existing investors are believed to still have had shares in the franchise.

== Development team ==
The Hurricanes have fielded a development team in competitions such as the Pacific Rugby Cup and in matches against other representative teams for several seasons. Known as the Hurricanes Hunters or Hurricanes Development XV, the squad is selected from the best emerging rugby talent in the Hurricanes catchment area and is composed of Hurricanes contracted players, wider training group members, under 20s, and selected club players.

== Honours ==
=== Super Rugby (1996–Present) ===
- Champions (2)

2016, 2026

- Runners-up (2)

2006, 2015

- Playoff Appearances (16)

1997, 2003, 2005, 2006, 2008, 2009, 2015, 2016, 2017, 2018, 2019, 2022, 2023, 2024,2025, 2026

- New Zealand/Australasian Conference Champions (2)

2015, 2016

== Records and achievements ==
=== Season standings ===
A season-by-season summary of the Hurricanes regular season results is shown below:

| Super 12 | Super 14 | Super Rugby | Super Rugby Aotearoa | Super Rugby Trans Tasman | Super Rugby Pacific |

| Season | Pos | Pld | W | D | L | F | A | +/- | BP | Pts | Notes |
|---|---|---|---|---|---|---|---|---|---|---|---|
| 1996 | 9th | 11 | 3 | 0 | 8 | 290 | 353 | -63 | 5 | 17 | |
| 1997 | 3rd | 11 | 6 | 0 | 5 | 416 | 314 | +102 | 10 | 34 | Lost to Brumbies in semi-final |
| 1998 | 8th | 11 | 5 | 0 | 6 | 313 | 342 | -29 | 6 | 26 | |
| 1999 | 10th | 11 | 4 | 1 | 6 | 213 | 226 | -13 | 4 | 22 | |
| 2000 | 8th | 11 | 6 | 0 | 5 | 308 | 329 | -29 | 5 | 29 | |
| 2001 | 9th | 11 | 5 | 0 | 6 | 291 | 316 | -25 | 5 | 25 | |
| 2002 | 9th | 11 | 5 | 0 | 6 | 232 | 317 | -85 | 3 | 23 | |
| 2003 | 3rd | 11 | 7 | 0 | 4 | 324 | 277 | +47 | 7 | 35 | Lost to Crusaders in semi-final |
| 2004 | 11th | 11 | 4 | 1 | 6 | 275 | 303 | -28 | 5 | 23 | |
| 2005 | 4th | 11 | 8 | 0 | 3 | 281 | 248 | +33 | 2 | 34 | Lost to Crusaders in semi-final |
| 2006 | 2nd | 13 | 10 | 0 | 3 | 328 | 226 | +102 | 7 | 47 | Lost to Crusaders in final |
| 2007 | 8th | 13 | 6 | 0 | 7 | 247 | 300 | -53 | 3 | 27 | |
| 2008 | 4th | 13 | 8 | 1 | 4 | 310 | 204 | +106 | 7 | 41 | Lost to Crusaders in semi-final |
| 2009 | 3rd | 13 | 9 | 0 | 4 | 380 | 279 | +101 | 8 | 44 | Lost to Chiefs in semi-final |
| 2010 | 8th | 13 | 7 | 1 | 5 | 358 | 323 | +35 | 7 | 37 | |
| 2011 | 9th | 16 | 5 | 2 | 9 | 328 | 398 | -70 | 10 | 42* | ^{1} |
| 2012 | 8th | 16 | 10 | 0 | 6 | 489 | 429 | +58 | 9 | 57* | ^{1} |
| 2013 | 11th | 16 | 6 | 0 | 10 | 386 | 457 | -71 | 9 | 41* | ^{1} |
| 2014 | 7th | 16 | 8 | 0 | 8 | 439 | 374 | +65 | 9 | 41 | |
| 2015 | 2nd | 16 | 14 | 0 | 2 | 458 | 288 | +170 | 10 | 66 | Lost to Highlanders in final |
| 2016 | 1st | 15 | 11 | 0 | 4 | 458 | 314 | +144 | 9 | 53 | Defeated Lions in final |
| 2017 | 3rd | 15 | 12 | 0 | 3 | 596 | 272 | +324 | 10 | 58 | Lost to Lions in semi-final |
| 2018 | 4th | 16 | 11 | 0 | 5 | 474 | 343 | +131 | 7 | 51 | Lost to Crusaders in semi-final |
| 2019 | 4th | 16 | 12 | 1 | 3 | 449 | 362 | +87 | 3 | 53 | Lost to Crusaders in semi-final |
| 2020 | 6th | 6 | 4 | 0 | 2 | 168 | 135 | +33 | 1 | 17 | Season cancelled due to COVID-19^{1} |
| 2020 | 3rd | 8 | 5 | 0 | 3 | 202 | 213 | -11 | 1 | 21 | No playoffs, round robin only^{2} |
| 2021 | 5th | 8 | 2 | 0 | 6 | 200 | 223 | -23 | 4 | 12 | ^{3} |
| 2021 | 4th | 5 | 4 | 0 | 1 | 195 | 93 | +102 | 5 | 21 | ^{4} |
| 2022 | 5th | 14 | 8 | 0 | 6 | 441 | 330 | +111 | 7 | 39 | Lost to Brumbies in quarter-final |
| 2023 | 5th | 14 | 9 | 0 | 5 | 480 | 338 | +142 | 5 | 41 | Lost to Brumbies in quarter-final |
| 2024 | 1st | 14 | 12 | 0 | 2 | 480 | 281 | +199 | 8 | 56 | Lost to Chiefs in semi-final |
| 2025 | 4th | 14 | 8 | 1 | 5 | 448 | 342 | +106 | 5 | 39 | Lost to Brumbies in Qualifying finals |
| 2026 | 1st | 14 | 11 | 0 | 3 | 562 | 298 | +264 | 11 | 55 | Defeated Chiefs in final |

==== Notes ====
^1 Teams were awarded four points for a bye during the Super Rugby seasons from 2011 to 2013. Each team took two bye rounds each season. These additional 8 points are included in their season points tally.
^2 All matches after Round 7 were cancelled. the season remained incomplete and no champion was awarded.
^3 Super Rugby Aotearoa was announced as a stand-in replacement competition for Super Rugby, between New Zealand Super Rugby sides. It was played as a round robin competition, with no finals. All teams played the other four teams twice, with the title awarded to the highest ranked team at the conclusion of the round robin fixtures.
^4 Super Rugby Aotearoa adopted the same format in 2021 as the inaugural tournament in 2020, with the addition of a final between the top two ranked teams at the conclusion of the round robin stage.
^5 Super Rugby Trans Tasman was a crossover competition between the teams involved in Super Rugby Aotearoa and Super Rugby AU. Each team from Super Rugby AU played each team from Super Rugby Aotearoa once, and vice versa. A final was played between the top two seeded teams at the conclusion of the round robin matches.

=== Results per opposition ===
Hurricanes Super Rugby results vs different opponents Super Rugby Match Results

Super Rugby
| Opposition | Span | Played | Won | Drawn | Lost | Win% |
|---|---|---|---|---|---|---|
| (New Zealand) Blues | 1996–2026 | 44 | 23 | 1 | 23 | 48.9% |
| (New Zealand) Chiefs | 1996–2026 | 49 | 25 | 2 | 22 | 51.02% |
| (New Zealand) Crusaders | 1996–2026 | 49 | 16 | 2 | 31 | 32.6% |
| (New Zealand) Highlanders | 1996–2026 | 46 | 31 | 0 | 15 | 67.3% |
| (Australia) Brumbies | 1996–2026 | 36 | 16 | 0 | 20 | 44.44% |
| (Australia) Force | 2006–2026 | 17 | 14 | 1 | 2 | 82.3% |
| (Australia) Rebels | 2011–2024 | 13 | 12 | 0 | 1 | 92.3% |
| (Australia) Reds | 1996–2026 | 28 | 22 | 0 | 6 | 78.5% |
| (Australia) Waratahs | 1996–2026 | 29 | 19 | 0 | 10 | 65.5% |
| (South Africa) Bulls | 1996–2019 | 22 | 12 | 0 | 10 | 54.5% |
| (South Africa) Cheetahs | 1997–2017 | 11 | 8 | 0 | 3 | 70.0% |
| (South Africa) Lions | 1996–2019 | 23 | 19 | 0 | 4 | 82.6% |
| (South Africa) Sharks | 1996–2020 | 24 | 12 | 1 | 11 | 50.0% |
| (South Africa) Southern Kings | 2013–2016 | 2 | 2 | 0 | 0 | 100.0% |
| (South Africa) Stormers | 1996–2019 | 21 | 9 | 0 | 12 | 42.9% |
| (Argentina) Jaguares | 2016–2019 | 4 | 3 | 0 | 1 | 75.0% |
| (Japan) Sunwolves | 2017–2019 | 4 | 4 | 0 | 0 | 100.0% |
| (Fiji) Fijian Drua | 2022-2026 | 5 | 3 | 0 | 2 | 60.0% |
| (Samoa) (Tonga) Moana Pasifika | 2022–2026 | 9 | 7 | 0 | 2 | 77.7% |
| Overall | 1996–2023 | 436 | 243 | 7 | 193 | 55.73% |
Updated to: 13 October 2025

=== Individual records ===
- Most Points in a career: 1,238 (Beauden Barrett)
- Most Points in a season: 223 (Beauden Barrett, 2016)
- Most Points in a match: 30 (Jordie Barrett, v Highlanders, 2021), (David Holwell, v Highlanders, 2001)
- Most Tries in a career: 65 (TJ Perenara)
- Most Tries in a season: 17 (Fehi Fineanganofo, 2026), (Josh Moorby, 2026)
- Most Tries in a match: 4 (Ben Lam, v Rebels, 2018), (Ngani Laumape, v Blues, 2018), (Baylin Sullivan, v Chiefs, 2025), (Fehi Fineanganofo, v Brumbies, 2026), (Josh Moorby, v Moana Pasifika, 2026)
- Most Conversions in a career: 249 (Beauden Barrett)
- Most Conversions in a season: 57 (Ruben Love, 2026)
- Most Conversions in a match: 9 (Beauden Barrett, v Rebels, 2012), (Otere Black, v Sunwolves, 2017), (Ruben Love, v Brumbies, 2026)
- Most Penalty goals in a career: 189 (Beauden Barrett)
- Most Penalty goals in a season: 40 (Beauden Barrett, 2013, 2014)
- Most Penalty goals in a match: 7 (Jamie Cameron, v Blues, 1996), (David Holwell, v Highlanders, 2001)
- Most Dropped goals in a career: 1 (Jackson Garden-Bachop), (Tusi Pisi), (Christian Cullen), (Tane Tu'ipulotu), (Beauden Barrett)
- Most Dropped goals in a season: 1 (Jackson Garden-Bachop, 2020), (Tusi Pisi, 2013), (Christian Cullen, 1999), (Tane Tu'ipulotu, 2008), (Beauden Barrett, 2016)
- Most Dropped goals in a match: 1 (Jackson Garden-Bachop, v Crusaders, 2020), (Tusi Pisi, v Blues, 2013), (Christian Cullen, v Crusaders, 1999), (Tane Tu'ipulotu, v Chiefs, 2008), (Beauden Barrett, 2016)
- Most Appearances: 162 (TJ Perenara)

=== Team Records ===
- Highest Regular Season Placing: 1st (2016, 2024, 2026)
- Most Wins in a Season: 14 (2015)
- Most Points in a Season: 455 (2026)
- Most Tries in a Season: 113 (2026)
- Fewest Wins in a Season: 3 (1996)
- Fewest Points in a Season: 163 (1999)
- Fewest Tries in a Season: 13 (1996)
- Biggest Win: 83–17 (66 point win in 2017 vs Sunwolves – Tokyo)
- Biggest Loss: 7–60 (53 point loss in 2002 vs Blues – Wellington)
- Most points ever scored in a game: 83 (2017 vs Sunwolves – Tokyo)
- Fewest points ever scored in a game: 0 (2020 vs Stormers – Cape Town)
- Longest Winning Streak: 10 (2016 vs Reds – 2017 vs Rebels), (2018 vs Jaguares – 2018 vs Reds)
- Longest Unbeaten Streak: 10 (2016 vs Reds – 2017 vs Rebels), (2018 vs Jaguares – 2018 vs Reds)

=== All Time Records ===
- Games played: 440
- Games won: 243
- Games lost: 172
- Games drawn: 7
- Winning percentage: (57%)
- Points for: 8,257
- Points against: 9,556
- Tries for: 747

Playoffs

- Games played: 23
- Games won: 9
- Games lost: 14
- Games drawn: 0
- Winning percentage: (39%)
- Home Wins: 8 (80%)
- Home Losses: 2
- Away Wins: 1 (7%)
- Away Losses: 12
- Points for: 553
- Points against: 577

(Record updated as of 2025 season)

== Current squad ==
The squad for the 2027 Super Rugby Pacific season is:

2027 Hurricanes squad
| **Props**: (New Zealand) Siale Lauaki; (New Zealand) **Tyrel Lomax**; (New Zealand) **Xavier Numia**; (New Zealand) **Pasilio Tosi**; (New Zealand) Tito Tuipulotu; (New Zealand) Rohan Wingham; **Hookers**: (New Zealand) **Asafo Aumua**; (New Zealand) Vernon Bason; (New Zealand) Jacob Devery; (New Zealand) Raymond Tuputupu; **Locks**: (New Zealand) Alefosio Aho; (New Zealand) Caleb Delany; (New Zealand) Dylan Eti; (New Zealand) Hunter Morrison; (New Zealand) Hugo Plummer | **Loose forwards**: (New Zealand) Oliver Haig; (New Zealand) Brayden Iose; (New Zealand) **Du'Plessis Kirifi**; (New Zealand) **Peter Lakai**; (Australia) Arese Poliko; (England) **Brad Shields**; (New Zealand) Semisi Tupou Ta'eiloa; **Halfbacks (scrum-halves)**: (New Zealand) Bryn Hall; (New Zealand) **Cam Roigard**; (New Zealand) Jordi Viljoen; **First five-eighths (fly-halves)**: (New Zealand) **Brett Cameron**; (New Zealand) Harry Godfrey; (New Zealand) **Ruben Love** | **Midfielders (centres)**: (New Zealand) Tamiro Armstrong; (New Zealand) **Jordie Barrett**; (New Zealand) Heremaia Murray; (New Zealand) **Billy Proctor**; (New Zealand) Jone Rova; **Outside backs**: (New Zealand) **Fehi Fineanganofo**; (New Zealand) Josh Gray; (New Zealand) Callum Harkin; (New Zealand) **Josh Moorby**; (New Zealand) Kini Naholo; (New Zealand) Ngane Punivai (injured) |
**Bold** denotes internationally capped players. denotes an injured player. Source:

=== Wider training group ===
The following players were named in the Hurricanes wider training group for the 2027 Super Rugby Pacific season:

- (New Zealand) Malakai Hala-Ngatai (Prop)
- (New Zealand) Logan Wallace (Prop)
- (New Zealand) Johnny Falloon (Lock)
- (New Zealand) Patrick Mauga (Loose forward)
- (New Zealand) Matolu Petaia (Loose forward)
- (New Zealand) Jai Tamati (Halfback)
- (New Zealand) Will Cole (First five-eighth)
- (South Africa) Garouw Basson (Midfielder)
- (Tonga) **Taniela Filimone** (Outside back)
- (Fiji) Waisake Salabiau (Outside back)
- (Australia) Lukas Ripley (Utility back)

== Former players ==
- Pita Alatini (17 tests, 3 matches)
- Inoke Afeaki*
- Bull Allen (8 tests, 19 matches)
- Stephen Bachop (5 tests, 13 matches)
- Beauden Barrett (88 tests, 1 match)
- Andrew Blowers (11 tests, 7 matches)
- James Broadhurst (1 test)
- Sireli Bobo*
- Bill Cavubati*
- Dane Coles (90 tests)
- Jerry Collins (48 tests, 2 matches)
- Mark Cooksley (11 tests, 12 matches)
- Phil Coffin (3 matches)
- Aaron Cruden (50 tests)
- Christian Cullen (58 tests, 2 matches)
- Chresten Davis (2 matches)
- Rhys Duggan (1 test)
- Jason Eaton (15 tests, 2 matches)
- Hika Elliot (4 tests, 1 match)
- Tamati Ellison (4 tests, 1 match)
- Bryn Evans (2 tests)
- Riki Flutey*
- Ben Franks (47 tests, 1 match)
- Hosea Gear (14 tests, 1 match)
- Zac Guildford (10 tests, 1 match)
- Norm Hewitt (9 tests, 5 matches)
- Andrew Hore (83 tests)
- Cory Jane(53 tests, 2 matches)
- Alama Ieremia (30 tests, 10 matches)
- Danny Lee (2 tests)
- Jonah Lomu (63 tests, 10 matches)
- Simon Mannix (1 test, 8 matches)
- Alby Mathewson (4 tests, 1 match)
- Chris Masoe (20 tests)
- Joe McDonnell (8 tests)
- Brad Mika (3 tests)
- Nehe Milner-Skudder (13 tests)
- Charlie Ngatai (1 test)
- Ma'a Nonu (103 tests, 1 match)
- Jason O'Halloran (1 test)
- TJ Perenara (69 tests, 1 match)
- Jon Preston (10 tests, 17 matches)
- Matt Proctor (1 test)
- Mark Ranby (1 test)
- Roger Randle (2 matches)
- John Schwalger (2 tests)
- Gordon Slater (3 tests, 3 matches)
- Conrad Smith (94 tests)
- Toby Smith*
- Rodney So'oialo (62 tests, 1 match)
- Jeremy Stanley (3 matches)
- Paul Steinmetz (1 test)
- Glenn Taylor (1 test, 5 matches)
- Jeremy Thrush (12 tests)
- Neemia Tialata (43 tests, 1 match)
- Filo Tiatia (2 tests)
- Isaia Toeava (36 tests, 1 match)
- Te Toiroa Tahuriorangi (3 tests)
- Ofisa Tonu'u (5 tests, 3 matches)
- Jeffery Toomaga-Allen (1 test, 2 matches)
- Tana Umaga (74 tests, 5 matches)
- Kupu Vanisi (1 test)
- Victor Vito (33 tests)
- Scott Waldrom (1 match)
- Dion Waller (1 test, 2 matches)
- Piri Weepu (71 tests, 2 matches)

== Former head coaches and captains ==
=== Head coaches ===
Hurricanes coaches by date, matches and win percentage*
| Coach | Period | G | W | D | L | % |
|---|---|---|---|---|---|---|
| Frank Oliver | 1996-1999 | 45 | 18 | 1 | 26 | 40.0 |
| Graham Mourie | 2000–2002 | 33 | 16 | 0 | 17 | 48.5 |
| Colin Cooper | 2003–2010 | 104 | 60 | 3 | 41 | 57.7 |
| Mark Hammett | 2011–2014 | 64 | 29 | 2 | 33 | 45.3 |
| Chris Boyd | 2015–2018 | 71 | 54 | 0 | 17 | 76.1 |
| John Plumtree | 2019 | 18 | 13 | 1 | 4 | 72.2 |
| Jason Holland | 2020–2023 | 57 | 32 | 0 | 25 | 56.1 |
| Clark Laidlaw | 2024–present | 37 | 27 | 1 | 9 | 73.0 |
| Totals (1996–present)^{*} | | 431 | 250 | 7 | 174 | 58.0 |
Updated to: 30 April 2026

Notes:

^* Official Super Rugby competition matches only, including finals.

=== Captains ===
- Bull Allen (1996–1998, 30 games – Captain)
- Jon Preston (1998, 3 games, Allen injured)
- Norm Hewitt (1998–2000, 15 games – Captain)
- Jason O'Halloran (1999, 8 games, Hewitt injured)
- Gordon Slater (2001–2002, 22 games – Captain)
- Tana Umaga (2003–2005, 35 games – Captain)
- Jerry Collins (2004, 3 games, Umaga injured)
- Rodney So'oialo (2006–2009, 49 games – Captain)
- Paul Tito (2007, 1 game, So'oialo injured)
- Tamati Ellison (2009, 1 game, So'oialo injured)
- Andrew Hore (2010–2011, 28 games – Captain)
- Victor Vito (2011, 2 games, Hore rested; 2013, 1 game)
- Conrad Smith (2007, 1 game; 2012–15, 60 games – Captain)
- Jeremy Thrush (2014, 3 games, C. Smith injured)
- Dane Coles (2015, 1 game, C. Smith rested) (2016–2018 – Captain)
- Brad Shields (2017, D. Coles injured; 2018, D. Coles injured; 2024–2025 – Captain)
- TJ Perenara (2016, 2 games, D. Coles injured; 2017, 7 games, D. Coles injured)
- Ardie Savea (2019–2023 – Captain)
- Du'Plessis Kirifi (2025–present – Captain)
- Asafo Aumua (2025 – Captain)
- Billy Proctor (2025 – Captain)
- Jordie Barrett (2026–present - Captain)

The above is a comprehensive list of Hurricanes captains. Official captains are named in the list as "Captain".

| Preceded by (New Zealand) Highlanders | Super Rugby Champions; 2016 (First title) | Succeeded by (New Zealand) Crusaders |
