= Josh Tengblad =

New Zealand rugby union player

- Full name: Joshua Tengblad
- Born: 19 October 2005 (age 21) New Zealand
- Height: 202 cm (6 ft 8 in)
- Weight: 115 kg (254 lb; 18 st 2 lb)
- School: Sacred Heart College, Auckland

Rugby union career
- Position: Lock
- Current team: Highlanders, Otago
Senior career
Years	Team	Apps	(Points)
2025–	Otago	1	(0)
2026–	Highlanders		
- Correct as of 16 November 2025
International career
Years	Team	Apps	(Points)
2025	New Zealand U20	3	(5)
- Correct as of 16 November 2025

Josh Tengblad (born 16 October 2005) is a New Zealand rugby union player, who plays for the Highlanders and Otago. His preferred position is lock.

== Early career ==
Tengblad attended Sacred Heart College, Auckland where he played rugby for their first XV. His performances for the school earned him selection for the New Zealand Schools side in 2023. After leaving school, he joined up firstly with the Blues academy, representing their U18 side in 2023. before joining the Highlanders academy who he represented at U20 level in 2025. In 2025 he represented the New Zealand U20 side.

== Professional career ==
Tengblad has represented Otago in the National Provincial Championship since 2025, being named as a replacement player in the squad for the 2025 Bunnings NPC. He was named in the Highlanders wider training group for the 2026 Super Rugby Pacific season.
