= Logan Wallace =

New Zealand rugby union player

- Born: 1 September 2005 (age 21) Palmerston North, New Zealand
- Height: 189 cm (6 ft 2 in)
- Weight: 117 kg (258 lb; 18 st 6 lb)
- School: Palmerston North Boys' High School

Rugby union career
- Position: Prop
- Current team: Hurricanes, Manawatu
Senior career
Years	Team	Apps	(Points)
2025–	Manawatu	2	(0)
2026–	Hurricanes		
- Correct as of 18 November 2025
International career
Years	Team	Apps	(Points)
2024–2025	New Zealand U20	3	(0)
- Correct as of 18 November 2025

Logan Wallace (born 1 September 2005) is a New Zealand rugby union player, who plays for the Hurricanes and Manawatu. His preferred position is prop.

== Early career ==
Wallace was born in Palmerston North and attended Palmerston North Boys' High School where he played rugby for the first XV, where he earned selection for the New Zealand Schools side in 2023. After leaving school, he joined up with the Hurricanes academy, who he represented at U18 level in 2022, and at U20 level in 2024. He plays his club rugby for Old Boys Marist. He was named in the New Zealand U20 side in both 2024 and 2025.

== Professional career ==
Wallace has represented Manawatu in the National Provincial Championship since 2025, being named in the squad for the 2025 Bunnings NPC. He was named in the Hurricanes wider training group for the 2026 Super Rugby Pacific season.
