= Time in Fiji =

Time in Fiji is given by Fiji Time (FJT) (UTC+12:00), as standard time, and UTC+13:00 as daylight saving time. Fiji decides year by year whether it will observe DST, and if so for which dates, which are usually a short period between November or December and January. No DST has been observed since 2020–2021.

== IANA time zone database ==
The IANA time zone database in the file zone.tab contains one time zone for Fiji, named "Pacific/Fiji".

== See also ==
- Daylight saving time in Fiji
- Time zone
