= Matolu Petaia =

New Zealand rugby union player

- Born: 9 April 2004 (age 22) Porirua, New Zealand
- Height: 194 cm (6 ft 4 in)
- Weight: 114 kg (251 lb; 17 st 13 lb)
- School: Hastings Boys' High School

Rugby union career
- Position: Lock / Flanker / Number 8
- Current team: Hurricanes, Wellington
Senior career
| Years | Team | Apps | (Points) |
| 2024– | Wellington | 12 | (0) |
| 2026– | Hurricanes | | |
- Correct as of 18 November 2025

Matolu Petaia (born 9 April 2004) is a New Zealand rugby union player, who plays for the Hurricanes and Wellington. His preferred position is lock, flanker or number 8.

== Early career ==
Petaia was born in Porirua and attended Hastings Boys' High School where he played rugby for the first XV. Having left school, he joined up with the Hurricanes academy, representing their U18 side in 2022, and U20 side in 2024. He plays his club rugby for Tawa RFC in Wellington, who he captains, winning U19 player of the year in 2023.

== Professional career ==
Petaia has represented Wellington in the National Provincial Championship since 2024, being named in the squad for the 2025 Bunnings NPC. He was named in the Hurricanes wider training group for the 2026 Super Rugby Pacific season.
