= Jai Tamati =

New Zealand rugby union player

- Born: 31 May 2005 (age 21) Christchurch, New Zealand
- Height: 170 cm (5 ft 7 in)
- Weight: 76 kg (168 lb; 12 st 0 lb)
- School: Rotorua Boys' High School

Rugby union career
- Position: Halfback
- Current team: Hurricanes, Manawatu
Senior career
Years	Team	Apps	(Points)
2025–	Manawatu	10	(5)
2026–	Hurricanes		
- Correct as of 19 November 2025
International career
Years	Team	Apps	(Points)
2025	New Zealand U20	6	(0)
- Correct as of 19 November 2025

Jai Tamati (born 31 May 2005) is a New Zealand rugby union player, who plays for the Hurricanes and Manawatu. His preferred position is halfback.

== Early career ==
Tamati was born in Christchurch and attended Rotorua Boys' High School where he played rugby for the first XV. His performances for the school earned him selection for the New Zealand Schools side in 2022, and New Zealand Schools Sevens side 2023. After leaving school, he joined up with the Hurricanes academy, representing their U20 side in 2024. He earned selection for the New Zealand U20 side in 2025.

== Professional career ==
Tamati has represented Manawatu in the National Provincial Championship since 2025, being named in the squad for the 2025 Bunnings NPC. He was named in the Hurricanes wider training group for the 2026 Super Rugby Pacific season.
