= Senita Lauaki =

New Zealand rugby union player

- Born: 21 July 2003 (age 23) New Zealand
- Height: 190 cm (6 ft 3 in)
- Weight: 110 kg (243 lb; 17 st 5 lb)
- School: Kelston Boys' High School
- Notable relative: Sione Lauaki (brother)

Rugby union career
- Position: Flanker / Number 8
- Current team: Highlanders, Waikato
Senior career
Years	Team	Apps	(Points)
2024–	Waikato	16	(10)
2026–	Highlanders		
- Correct as of 16 November 2025

Senita Lauaki (born 21 July 2003) is a New Zealand rugby union player, who plays for the Highlanders and Waikato. His preferred position is flanker or number 8.

== Early career ==
Lauaki attended Kelston Boys' High School where he played rugby for the first XV, captaining the side. His performances for the school earned him selection for the New Zealand Schools Barbarians side. After leaving school, he joined up with the Chiefs academy, representing their U20 side in 2023. He plays his club rugby for Hautapu Sports and is the brother of former All Black Sione Lauaki.

== Professional career ==
Lauaki has represented Waikato in the National Provincial Championship since 2024, being named in the squad for the 2025 Bunnings NPC. He was named in the Highlanders wider training group for the 2026 Super Rugby Pacific season.
