= Anzac Test (rugby union) =

Rugby union Test match

- Australia New Zealand
- Native name: Māori: Rā o Ngā Hōia Tēhi (Note: English: Anzac Day Test)
- Other names: Anzac Bledisloe Cup Test
- Sport: Rugby union
- First meeting: 25 April 2027

Statistics
- Trophy series: Bledisloe Cup

The Anzac Test, also known as the Anzac Bledisloe Cup Test, or simply the Anzac Day Test, is a biennial one-off rugby union test match between Australia and New Zealand played on Anzac Day that will first take place in 2027. Spanning more than 180 test matches, the Australia–New Zealand rivalry is the most frequently contested fixture in international rugby union.

== Anzac ==
ANZAC stands for the Australian and New Zealand Army Corps, a military force formed during the First World War. Australian and New Zealand soldiers fought together at the Gallipoli campaign in 1915, where their courage and sacrifice became an important part of both nations' identities. Today, ANZAC represents the close relationship between Australia and New Zealand. Every year on 25 April, both countries observe ANZAC Day to honour those who have served in wars and conflicts. Beyond its military origins, ANZAC reflects the strong cultural bond between Australia and New Zealand.

Ten Australian and thirteen New Zealand Test players died in the First World War.

== History ==
The initial idea of an Anzac Day Bledisloe fixture played between Australia and New Zealand was proposed around 2014–2015, but was rejected by New Zealand Rugby (NZR) due to scheduling difficulties.

In April 2024, Rugby Australia (RA) chairman Daniel Herbert publicly pitched the idea of a one-off Test match between Australia and New Zealand on Anzac Day. He stated that it would be an obvious and profitable move, and argued it could become a marquee event similar to the State of Origin rugby league series. Implicit in the proposal was a return to three Bledisloe Cup fixtures, reversing the 2022 reduction to two matches and reinstating the long-standing arrangement that had been in effect since the mid-2000s. NZR was reportedly open to the idea, with chief executive Mark Robinson commenting to The Sydney Morning Herald: "The Bledisloe Cup series is something which is truly special in our game and a highlight for Wallabies and All Blacks fans each season... we had a constructive set of meetings with RA recently and they tabled the idea of an Anzac Bledisloe match", and added: "as with all discussions about matters in the future... we will keep the conversations going."

By September 2024, RA and NZR were reportedly close to approving the Anzac Day match proposal, and was at an advanced stage of negotiations, with the Western Australian government prepared to pay a lucrative sum to host the event at Perth Stadium. It was also reported that the fixture would also coincide with Super Rugby's Super Round, creating a major rugby festival in Perth by staging both events over the same period. The negotiation's between the two unions formed part of wider effort between the Australian and New Zealand rugby unions regarding New Zealand's planned tour of South Africa in 2026. Although stating that NZR were "really open to it", chief executive Mark Robinson mentioned that the timeframe for a 2026 event kickoff was too rushed.

In March 2025, NZR declined the proposal after various stakeholders did not give their support toward the idea. In January 2026, a women's Anzac Day Test between Australia and New Zealand was confirmed, and was part of the 2026 Laurie O'Reilly Cup that took place on the Sunshine Coast, Queensland. This event was seen as a boost to the men's proposal.

After receiving the support of All Blacks coach Dave Rennie, the Anzac Day Bledisloe Test was finally announced on 28 June 2026. The Western Australian and Queensland governments vied for the hosting rights in negotiations with Rugby Australia, with Brisbane's Lang Park ultimately emerging successful and securing the event for 2027, 2029, and 2031.

== Results ==
Year	Winner	Result	Runners-up	Venue	Attendance
2027	TBD			Lang Park, Brisbane	TBD
