= Highlanders (rugby union) =

New Zealand professional rugby union team

- Union: New Zealand Rugby Union
- Nickname(s): The Highlanders, Landers
- Founded: 1996
- Location: Dunedin, New Zealand
- Region: North Otago; Otago; Southland
- Ground: Forsyth Barr Stadium (Capacity: 30,748)
- Coach: Jamie Joseph
- Captain: TBA
- Most caps: Aaron Smith (185)
- Top scorer: Lima Sopoaga (866)
- Most tries: Waisake Naholo (45)
- League: Super Rugby Pacific
- 2026: 9th overall Playoffs: DNQ
1st kit	2nd kit

Official website
- thehighlanders.co.nz

The Highlanders (Māori: Kahupeka; formerly the Otago Highlanders) is a New Zealand professional rugby union team based in Dunedin that compete in Super Rugby. The team was formed in 1996 to represent the lower South Island in the newly formed Super 12 competition, and includes the Otago, North Otago and Southland unions. The Highlanders take their name from the Scottish immigrants that founded the Otago, North Otago, and Southland regions in the 1840s and 1850s.

Their main ground through the 2011 Super Rugby season was Carisbrook in Dunedin, with home games occasionally being played in Invercargill and Queenstown. The Highlanders moved into Carisbrook's replacement, Forsyth Barr Stadium at University Plaza, for the 2012 season; the stadium opened in time for the 2011 Rugby World Cup, but after the Super Rugby season.

They finished the inaugural season eighth, and the following season finished last after winning only three of eleven matches. However, in the 1998, 1999 and 2000 seasons they qualified for semi-finals; hosting the 1999 competition final against fellow South Island team the Crusaders. They lost the match 24–19, and the following year were again knocked out by the Crusaders—this time in their semi-final. In the following fifteen seasons they would only finish in the top four once more, in 2002. But in 2015, they were crowned Super Rugby champions after beating the Hurricanes at Westpac Stadium .

Current Highlander, Aaron Smith has played a record 176 games for the Highlanders, and 47 other players have played over 50 games for the team. The Highlanders' highest career points scorer is Lima Sopoaga with 866 points, and highest career try scorer is Waisake Naholo with 45 tries.

== History ==
The Highlanders' franchise was created as one of five New Zealand teams in the Super 12. Originally named the Otago Highlanders, the Highlanders' franchise area encompassed the lower South Island of New Zealand, and was formed from the North Otago, Otago, and Southland provincial rugby unions.

The 1996 team was captained by John Leslie and coached by Gordon Hunter. Their first Super 12 match was against the Queensland Reds at Carisbrook on 3 March 1996, whom they defeated 57–17. After three matches the Highlanders were undefeated and leading the competition. However the following week at Loftus Versfeld Stadium in South Africa they were defeated 59–29 by Northern Transvaal. They only won two more games that season, against Natal at Carisbrook and against the Canterbury Crusaders at Lancaster Park, and they finished the season eighth on the table.

1997 was the least successful season ever for the Highlanders. They finished last in the competition, and managed only three wins. They were now coached by Glenn Ross and captained by Taine Randell. Their eight defeats that season included a 75–43 loss to Natal in Durban. The points scored by Natal included 50 points by Gavin Lawless – a competition record. Following their last place in the 1997 season, Tony Gilbert was appointed as coach. Their first game under his guidance was an upset 26–19 win over the Queensland Reds. The Highlanders eventually became the first New Zealand side to defeat all four South African teams in one season. (Note: The Crusaders achieved the same feat one day later.) After defeating the Bulls at Loftus Versfeld they needed the Queensland Reds not to defeat the Brumbies by a large margin. Queensland were defeated by the Brumbies 23–16 and the Highlanders finished fourth, thus qualifying for the semi-finals. In the semi-final, they faced defending champions the Auckland Blues at Eden Park. The Blues were leading 20–16 at halftime, and were leading 30–26 before a controversial try to Adrian Cashmore pushed the Blues to a 37–26 lead. Joeli Vidiri had illegally taken out Highlander Stanley off the ball.

The following season in 1999 the Highlanders improved on their 1997 season record by reaching and hosting the tournament final. They opened their season with a 19–13 victory over the Auckland Blues at Carisbrook. This was followed by a victory over the Northern Bulls, the Stormers at Carisbrook, and the Cats, before their first loss of the season to the Sharks. They returned to New Zealand to defeat the Waikato Chiefs and then the Crusaders. After defeating the Reds, the Highlanders lost to the New South Wales Waratahs at Carisbrook. The next week they defeated the Brumbies at the same venue. In their next match, despite leading the Wellington Hurricanes 14–3 at half time, the Highlanders lost when Hurricanes half back Jason Spice scored in the corner to give the Hurricanes a 21–19 victory. Had the Highlanders won they would have finished top of the table and hosted a semi-final at Carisbrook. Instead they then had to travel to South Africa where they defeated the Stormers 33–18. The Highlanders travelled back to Dunedin for the 1999 Super 12 Final, which was against South Island rivals the Canterbury Crusaders, and was billed as "the party at Tony Brown's house" after Highlanders first five-eighth Tony Brown. The Highlanders scored first, and led 14–9 at half time. However the decisive try was to Crusaders wing Afato So'oalo, who chipped the ball then out-sprinted All Blacks winger Jeff Wilson to collect the ball and score. Although the Highlanders scored a try to Isitolo Maka with three minutes remaining, the Crusaders won 24–19.

The Highlanders opened their 2000 season with a 50–13 victory over the Queensland Reds at Carisbrook. They won their next three matches, against the Sharks, Hurricanes and Cats. However they then lost their following three; against the Crusaders, Brumbies, and Blues. They played the Crusaders at Jade Stadium in their semi-final, and were defeated 37–15 after Marika Vunibaka scored two tries for the Crusaders in the last 20 minutes. The next season opened with a 23–8 victory over the Blues. Their 39–20 defeat of the Waratahs at Carisbrook on 7 April was the first defeat of New South Wales by an Otago-based side since the Otago provincial team defeated New South Wales 5–0 in 1901. (Note: Prior to the Super 12 in 1996, Otago had played New South Wales in 1925, 1991 and twice in 1995.) The Highlanders narrowly lost to the Hurricanes in Napier 35–33 before defeating the Brumbies at Carisbrook on 20 April. Although the Highlanders went undefeated at home for a second consecutive season, they finished fifth with six wins that season.

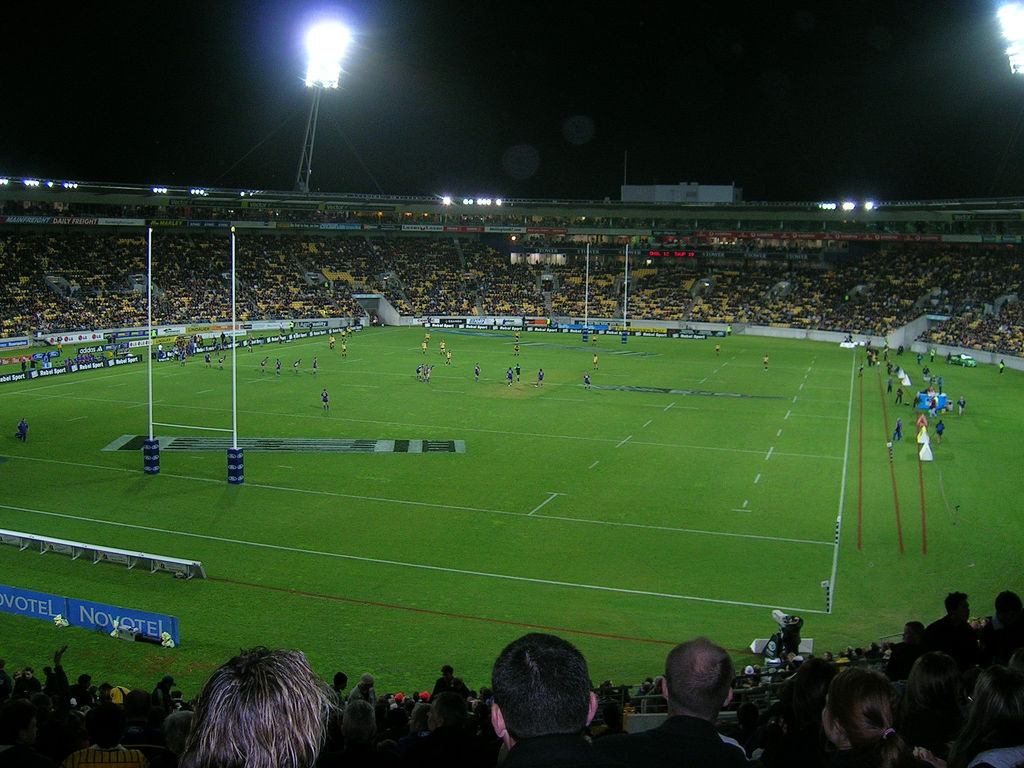
The Highlanders playing the Hurricanes at Wellington in 2005; their first win over them at that venue

Laurie Mains had returned from South Africa to coach Otago in the 2001 National Provincial Championship (NPC), and was appointed the Highlanders coach for 2002. Their season started with a narrow 30–28 loss to the Crusaders at Jade Stadium. That year the Highlanders also achieved a win over all four South African teams. The Gordon Hunter Memorial Trophy was also introduced that season to be contested between the Highlanders and Blues. Gordon Hunter had coached both teams before dying from cancer in 2001. The match was played at Eden Park, and the Highlanders were ahead 15–3 at half time, and eventually won 20–13. Their last home match of the season was against the Reds at Carisbrook. The Highlanders' 40–26 win meant that they had gone three seasons undefeated at Carisbrook. The Highlanders finished fourth and played the Crusaders in Christchurch where they lost 34–23, although Jeff Wilson did score a try in his last match for the franchise.

The 2003 season started with a 29–16 win over the Chiefs in Hamilton. They then defeated the Stormers and Bulls before losing to the Cats in Johannesburg. Their second loss occurred when the Crusaders defeated them 17–16 at Carisbrook. The Highlanders had gone three seasons, 2000, 2001 and 2002, and 16 games unbeaten at Carisbrook before that loss. The Highlanders then defeated the Blues 22–11 to retain the Gordon Hunter Memorial Trophy. In April that year it was revealed a rift had developed between coach Laurie Mains and some of the senior players in the squad. Anton Oliver was branded the ringleader by Mains, and after their final game of the season Mains resigned and was replaced by his assistant Greg Cooper.

In contrast to their previous season, in 2004 the Highlanders conceded 44 tries, twelve more than in 2003, but scored nine more tries then in 2003. Not only did they have a new head coach, but also thirteen new players in their squad. This all contributed to them finishing the season ninth that season. The Highlanders' 2005 season started with a loss to the Blues at Carisbrook. Following this the side won six games consecutively, the first time the franchise had ever done so. After a draw with the Stormers and a bye, the Highlanders had gone unbeaten for eight weeks. Three weeks from the end of the round robin they were third, but after losing their remaining three matches fell to eighth for the season.

After ten years the Super 12 was expanded to include two extra teams; the Western Force from Australia, and the Cheetahs from South Africa. The expanded competition was renamed the Super 14. The Highlanders continued under Cooper in 2006. After losing their first match of 2006 to the Crusaders, they then won their next three. After only won two of their last six games, they finished the season ranked ninth. The 2007 ended with a similar result to 2006. The Highlanders again finished ninth on the table, and worst of the New Zealand teams. They finished the season with five wins and eight losses from their thirteen matches.

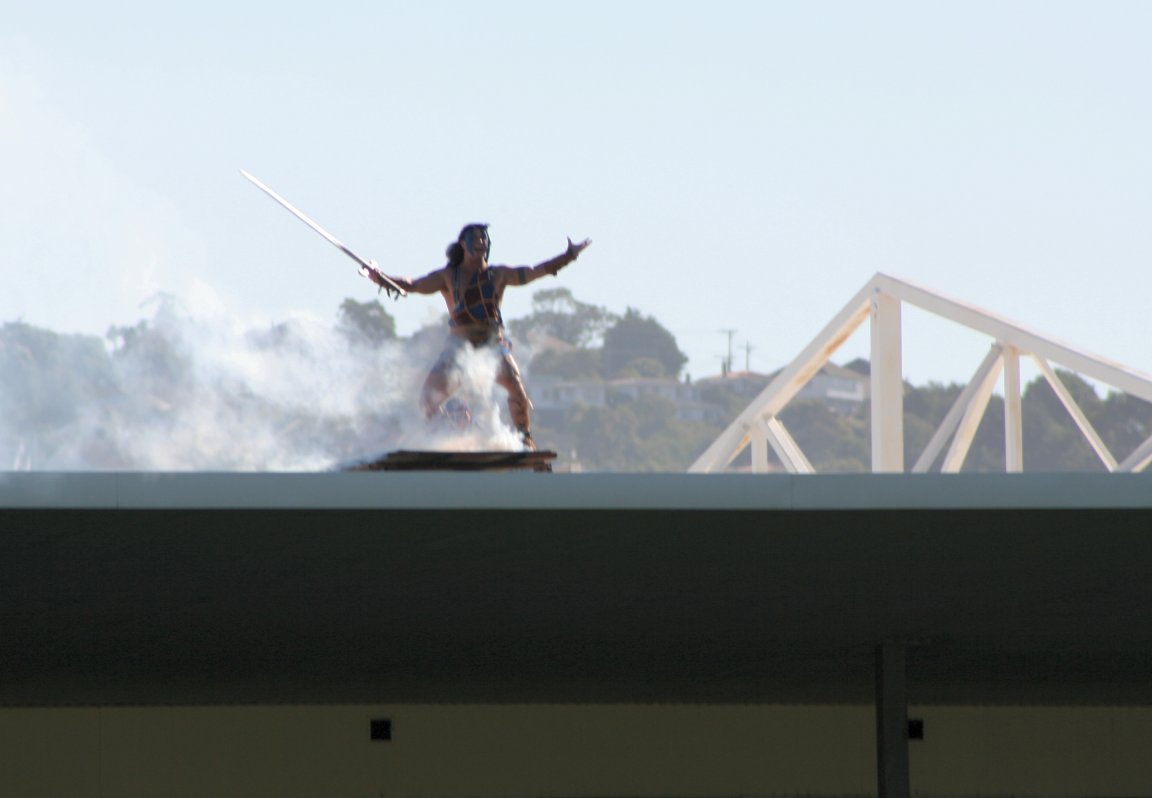
The Highlander mascot performing before a match at Carisbrook stadium in 2007

While the fortunes of the franchise had been declining for a few years, they would bottom out with a player exodus following the 2007 Rugby World Cup. The squad's entire All Black front row of Carl Hayman, Anton Oliver, and Clarke Dermody left for lucrative contracts in Europe, while star first-five Nick Evans moved north to Auckland to play for the Blues, and hugely talented young lock James Ryan was forced to retire at age 24 due to injury problems. Joining the exodus were several other veteran starters, along with coach Greg Cooper who left the franchise to take up an assistant coaching position with the Blues. The coach for the 2008 season, Glenn Moore, was appointed 28 August 2007.

Moore was left with a weak side of young and inexperienced players which would stumble to a franchise-worst record of only 3 wins against 10 losses during the 2008 Super 14 season, and finished as the lowest-placed New Zealand team on the table. Jimmy Cowan, one of the team's few bright spots through this period, was appointed team captain for 2009, but things would improve little over the following two seasons as the team again limped to the worst record of the New Zealand clubs. When Moore was released as coach following the 2010 season, the franchise had compiled a record of only 10 wins against 29 losses in three seasons under his leadership.

Former All Black Jamie Joseph was hired as coach for the 2011 Super Rugby season, while Jamie Mackintosh replaced Cowan as team captain. The campaign would prove to be the franchise's most successful in several years, as they raced out to a 3–0 start including a monumental away win over the Bulls in Pretoria. They remained in playoff contention for almost the entire season, sitting 8–4 at one juncture, before slumping under an injury cloud at the end of the year to finish 8th on the table.

Highlanders won the 2015 Super Rugby season defeating the Hurricanes 21–14 in Wellington. Phil Gifford called the win the "greatest Super Rugby comeback this century".

In 2017, the Highlanders won over the British & Irish Lions 23–22 at Dunedin, during the Lions tour to New Zealand.

2018 was a season of ups and downs for the Highlanders. They started their season 3–0 including a win over the defending champions Crusaders in Dunedin and finished their season in 6th place. Despite this, they would suffer a shock loss to the Waratahs after leading 23–3 at one point, they lost 30–23 in Sydney.

2019 was another up and down season for the Highlanders. At the end of the overall season the Highlanders had won 6, drawn 3 and lost 7, which somehow put them into 8th for the playoffs. However, they would lose to the Crusaders in that game (38–14)

After 7 rounds of the 2020 Super Rugby season, the Highlanders were 11th overall and 5th in the NZ conference. They were bound to play the Jaguares in round 7 but the COVID-19 pandemic suspended play of that game and cancelled the rest of the tournament. However, domestic Super Rugby competitions started up, and the one in New Zealand was Super Rugby Aotearoa. The Highlanders finished 4th in Super Rugby Aotearoa 2020 winning only 3 games, 2 of which were against the Chiefs (28–27) and (31–33) and one against the Hurricanes (38–21)

The 2021 season of Super Rugby Aotearoa saw the Highlanders finish 4th again, with 3 wins. They beat the Chiefs (23–39), Crusaders (12–33) and the Blues (35–29). After the season of Super Rugby Aotearoa finished, the Highlanders will partake in Super Rugby Trans-Tasman (competition between the NZ and Australian teams) in which they won all 5 of their games against Australian opposition, and went to the final against the Blues, which they lost 23–15.

2022 was one of the worst years ever for the Highlanders. The Highlanders were winless until Round 8, when they beat Moana Pasifika 37–17. After two more losses, things began to look up for them, beating the Drua 27–24, the Reds (27–19) and the Force (61–10) which put them in quarter-finals contention, since they had many losing bonus points alongside that. However, they lost their last two games of the regular season, and despite the final round loss to the Rebels (31–30) they only just made it into the quarters thanks to their losing bonus point. They ended up getting heavily beaten by the Blues in the quarter finals 35–6, ending the Highlanders worst season ever, with 4 games won from 14 in the regular season.

== Name and colours ==
The logo of the Otago Highlanders before they changed their name

The name Highlanders was chosen after the early Scottish settlers in the lower South Island. These Scottish settlers were the founders of Dunedin—known as the "Edinburgh of the South", and the city where the Highlanders are based. According to the Highlanders official website: " The name and image of the Highlander conjures up visions of fierce independence, pride in one's roots, loyalty, strength, kinship, honesty, and hard work."

The colours of the Highlanders formerly encompassed the provincial colours of North Otago, Otago, and Southland; yellow, blue and maroon. Blue is also the predominant colour of the Flag of Scotland, and is used by many sports teams in that country.

On 3 June 2011, the Highlanders introduced—controversially—a new predominantly lime green home kit. It was debuted in the Highlanders' final home match of the 2011 Super Rugby season.

Despite the resounding negative feedback from fans, this kit was initially confirmed for the 2012 season. On 6 September 2011, however, the club announced a change of heart—they would be returning to their traditional blue strip for home matches, and using the lime green kit for away matches during the 2012 Super Rugby season.

== Franchise area ==
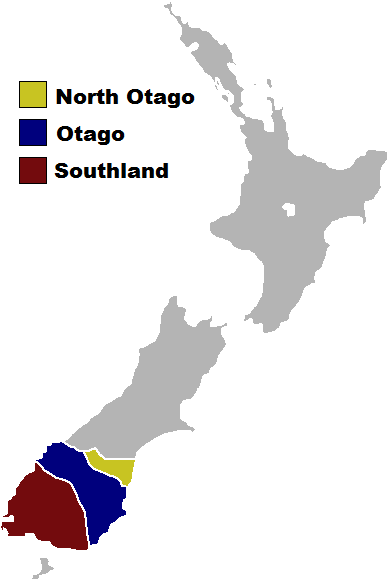
The unions that encompass the Highlanders' region

The Highlanders' franchise area consists of the region controlled by the North Otago, Otago and Southland Rugby Unions. Both Otago and Southland compete in the semi-professional Mitre 10 Cup (formerly the ITM Cup and Air New Zealand Cup), and North Otago in the amateur Heartland Championship.

== Song and cultural impact ==
In the 1990s, Dunedin City Councillor Bill Acklin wrote and performed a supporters’ song for the Highlanders, which was frequently sung by fans before kickoff at Carisbrook Stadium and helped energise the terraces among supporters.

In 2024, an updated version of the Highlanders song was released by the Dunedin City Council as part of the "They Save We Pay" campaign opposing proposed clinical service cuts to the New Dunedin Hospital project. The council described the revised song as a rallying cry for the southern community and encouraged supporters to learn and sing it at campaign events.

== Stadiums ==
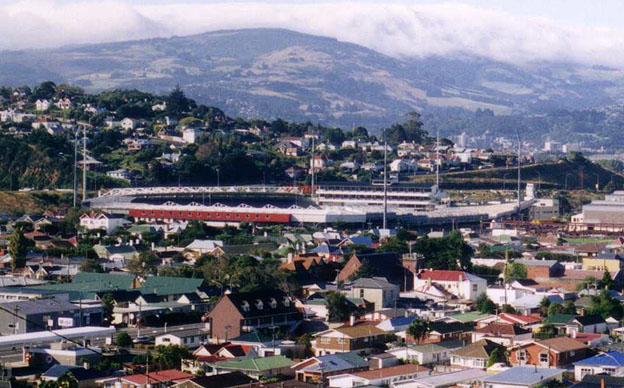
Carisbrook stadium

Starting with the 2012 season, the Highlanders moved into the Forsyth Barr Stadium, opened in August 2011. It was built to replace their original home of Carisbrook, which was no longer suitable for international rugby, or as a venue for the 2011 Rugby World Cup. The Carisbrook Stadium Trust was established in 2006 to manage the planning and construction of a new stadium. The new stadium is not on the current Carisbrook site, but instead near the University of Otago and Otago Harbour. It is a roofed, all weather stadium with a rectangular configuration, and permanent seating capacity of 25,000 that could be expanded to 30,748 if necessary.

The Highlanders' original home ground was the 29,000 capacity Carisbrook in Dunedin. Carisbrook is also known as "The Brook", or as "The House of Pain" due to its reputation as a difficult venue to visit. The stadium was also well known for Dunedin's large student population (known as "Scarfies") that occupied the terraces—an uncovered concrete embankment at the eastern end of the ground.

The Highlanders usually play at least one regular season match outside of Dunedin, at either Rugby Park in Invercargill or the Queenstown Events Centre in Queenstown. Prior to 2007 the regular season match was usually played at Rugby Park, however in 2007 they played a match at the Queenstown Events Centre. The Highlanders have also played pre-season matches at Centennial Park in Oamaru and at the Showgrounds in Balclutha.

On 28 March 2009, the Highlanders played a home game at FMG Stadium in Palmerston North against the Bulls. This game attracted a crowd of 10,000; one of the Highlanders' biggest of the 2009 season.

Invercargill	Dunedin	Queenstown
Rugby Park Stadium	Forsyth Barr Stadium	Queenstown Events Centre
Capacity: 20,000	Capacity: 30,748	Capacity: 19,000

== Development team ==
The Highlanders have fielded a development team in competitions such as the Pacific Rugby Cup and in matches against other representative teams for several seasons. Known as the Highlanders Development XV, the squad is selected from the best emerging rugby talent in the Highlanders catchment area and is composed of Highlanders contracted players, wider training group members, under 20s, and selected club players.

== Honours ==
=== Super Rugby (1996–Present) ===
- Champions (1)

2015

- Runners-up (1)

1999

- Super Rugby Trans-Tasman Runners-up (1)

2021

- Playoff Appearances (11)

1998, 1999, 2000, 2002, 2014, 2015, 2016, 2017, 2018, 2019, 2022, 2024

== Records and achievements ==
=== Season standings ===
A season-by-season summary of Highlanders regular season results is shown below:

Super 12	Super 14	Super Rugby	Super Rugby Aotearoa	Super Rugby Trans Tasman	Super Rugby Pacific

Season	Pos	Pld	W	D	L	F	A	+/-	BP	Pts	Notes
1996	8th	11	5	0	6	329	391	−62	6	26	
1997	12th	11	3	0	8	299	409	−110	5	17	
1998	4th	11	7	0	4	343	279	+64	6	34	Lost to Blues in semi-final
1999	2nd	11	8	0	3	280	203	+77	3	35	Lost to Crusaders in final
2000	3rd	11	6	0	5	320	280	+40	8	32	Lost to Crusaders in semi-final
2001	5th	11	6	0	5	284	295	−11	5	29	
2002	4th	11	8	0	3	329	207	+122	6	38	Lost to Crusaders in semi-final
2003	7th	11	6	0	5	287	246	+41	5	29	
2004	9th	11	4	1	6	299	347	−48	8	26	
2005	8th	11	6	1	4	221	214	+7	1	27	
2006	6th	13	6	0	7	228	276	−48	3	27	
2007	9th	13	5	0	8	235	301	−66	7	27	
2008	9th	13	3	0	10	257	338	−81	7	19	
2009	11th	13	4	0	9	254	269	−15	10	26	
2010	12th	13	3	0	10	297	397	−100	6	18	
2011	8th	16	8	0	8	296	343	−47	5	45*	^{1}
2012	9th	16	9	0	7	359	385	−26	6	50*	^{1}
2013	14th	16	3	0	13	374	496	−122	9	29*	^{1}
2014	6th	16	8	0	8	401	442	−41	10	42	Lost to Sharks in qualifier
2015	1st	16	11	0	5	450	333	+117	9	53	Defeated Hurricanes in final
2016	3rd	15	11	0	4	422	273	+149	8	52	Lost to Lions in semi-final
2017	7th	15	11	0	4	488	308	+180	7	51	Lost to Crusaders in quarter-final
2018	6th	16	10	0	6	437	445	−6	4	44	Lost to Waratahs in quarter-final
2019	8th	16	6	3	7	441	392	+49	6	36	Lost to Crusaders in quarter-final
2020	11th	6	1	1	4	91	163	−72	1	7	Season cancelled due to COVID-19^{2}
2020	4th	8	3	0	5	197	227	−30	2	14	No playoffs, round robin only^{3}
2021	4th	8	3	0	5	201	226	−25	2	14	^{4}
2021	2nd	5	5	0	0	199	96	+103	3	23	Lost to Blues in final^{5}
2022	8th	14	4	0	10	348	345	+3	7	23	Lost to Blues in quarter-final
2023	9th	14	5	0	9	362	459	−97	4	24	
2024	6th	14	6	0	8	305	402	−97	4	28	Lost to Brumbies in quarter-final
2025	11th	14	3	0	11	332	422	−90	8	20	

==== Notes ====
^1 Teams were awarded four points for a bye during the Super Rugby seasons from 2011 to 2013. Each team took two bye rounds each season. These additional 8 points are included in their season points tally.
^2 All matches after Round 7 were cancelled. the season remained incomplete and no champion was awarded.
^3 Super Rugby Aotearoa was announced as a stand-in replacement competition for Super Rugby, between New Zealand Super Rugby sides. It was played as a round robin competition, with no finals. All teams played the other four teams twice, with the title awarded to the highest ranked team at the conclusion of the round robin fixtures.
^4 Super Rugby Aotearoa adopted the same format in 2021 as the inaugural tournament in 2020, with the addition of a final between the top two ranked teams at the conclusion of the round robin stage.
^5 Super Rugby Trans Tasman was a crossover competition between the teams involved in Super Rugby Aotearoa and Super Rugby AU. Each team from Super Rugby AU played each team from Super Rugby Aotearoa once, and vice versa. A final was played between the top two seeded teams at the conclusion of the round robin matches.

=== Results per opposition ===
Highlanders Super Rugby results vs different opponents Super Rugby Match Results

Super Rugby
Opposition	Span	Played	Won	Drawn	Lost	Win%
(New Zealand) Blues	1996–2023	42	17	0	25	40.5%
(New Zealand) Chiefs	1996–2023	39	17	1	21	43.6%
(New Zealand) Crusaders	1996–2023	45	12	1	32	21.5%
(New Zealand) Hurricanes	1996–2023	40	15	0	25	37.5%
(Australia) Brumbies	1996–2022	26	13	0	13	50.0%
(Australia) Force	2006–2023	15	8	0	7	53.3%
(Australia) Rebels	2011–2022	11	7	0	4	63.6%
(Australia) Reds	1996–2022	25	15	0	10	60.0%
(Australia) Waratahs	1996–2022	27	11	0	16	40.7%
(South Africa) Bulls	1996–2020	23	14	2	7	60.9%
(South Africa) Cheetahs	1997–2017	11	9	0	2	81.8%
(South Africa) Lions	1996–2019	22	13	0	9	59.1%
(South Africa) Sharks	1996–2020	23	9	0	14	39.1%
(South Africa) Southern Kings	2013–2016	2	1	0	1	50.0%
(South Africa) Stormers	1996–2019	22	12	1	9	54.5%
(Argentina) Jaguares	2016–2019	2	2	0	0	100.0%
(Japan) Sunwolves	2017–2019	2	2	0	0	100.0%
(Fiji) Fijian Drua	2022–2023	2	2	0	0	100.0%
(Samoa) (Tonga) Moana Pasifika	2022–2023	2	2	0	0	100.0%
Overall	1996–2023	381	181	5	195	47.5%
Updated to: 24 April 2023

=== Team records ===
The 2014 season set several new records for the team, that had stood since the 1998 and 1999 seasons. They scored their most ever points (425), and most ever tries (42) in a season. Lima Sopoaga set a franchise record for most points in a season with 178, becoming just the third Highlander to score 25 points in a game. The 2000 year saw perhaps their greatest victory ever with their 65–23 win against the Bulls, setting several records; most points in a match, most tries in a match with nine, and largest winning margin of 42.

Former first five-eighth Tony Brown holds the record for most career points with 857. His 857 career points included 144 conversions, 183 penalties, and six drop-goals. The most points in a single match is held by former fullback Ben Blair who scored 28 against the Sharks in 2005. Most career tries is held by former player Jeff Wilson with 35. Wilson and Blair also share the record for most tries in a single match with three along with Israel Dagg, Doug Howlett, Ryan Nicholas, Jeremy Stanley, and To'o Vaega.

== Current squad ==
The squad for the 2027 Super Rugby Pacific season is:

2027 Highlanders squad
**Props**: (New Zealand) **Jermaine Ainsley** (injured) (Note: Previously an international player for Australia, Ainsley switched his international allegiance to New Zealand, but has only represented the Māori All Blacks.); (New Zealand) Josh Bartlett; (New Zealand) **Ethan de Groot**; (New Zealand) Benet Kumeroa; (New Zealand) Saula Ma'u; (New Zealand) Jack Sexton; (New Zealand) **Angus Taʻavao**; **Hookers**: (New Zealand) Henry Bell; (New Zealand) Ioane Moananu; (New Zealand) Jack Taylor; **Locks**: (New Zealand) Mitchell Dunshea; (New Zealand) **Fabian Holland**; (Argentina) **Tomás Lavanini**; (New Zealand) Josh Tengblad	**Loose forwards**: (New Zealand) Nikora Broughton; (New Zealand) Lucas Casey; (New Zealand) **Shannon Frizell**; (New Zealand) TK Howden; (New Zealand) Veveni Lasaqa; (New Zealand) Will Stodart; (Fiji) **Joseva Tamani**; (New Zealand) Sean Withy; **Halfbacks (scrum-halves)**: (New Zealand) **Folau Fakatava**; (New Zealand) Adam Lennox; (New Zealand) Dylan Pledger; **First five-eighths (fly-halves)**: (New Zealand) Josh Jacomb; (New Zealand) Mika Muliaina; (Tonga) **Patrick Pellegrini**	**Midfielders (centres)**: (New Zealand) Meihana Grindlay; (Australia) Reesjan Pasitoa; (New Zealand) **Timoci Tavatavanawai**; (New Zealand) Josh Whaanga; **Outside backs**: (New Zealand) Finn Hurley; (New Zealand) Jona Nareki; (New Zealand) Jacob Ratumaitavuki-Kneepkens; (New Zealand) Stanley Solomon; (New Zealand) Caleb Tangitau; (New Zealand) Xavier Tito-Harris; (Samoa) **Tuna Tuitama**
**Bold** denotes internationally capped players. denotes an injured player. Source:

=== Wider training group ===
The following players were named in the Highlanders wider training group for the 2027 Super Rugby Pacific season:

- (New Zealand) Ben Lopas (Prop)
- (Tonga) **Solomone Tukuafu** (Prop)
- (Samoa) **Manaaki Boyle-Tiatia** (Hooker)
- (New Zealand) Reuben Allen (Lock)
- (New Zealand) Phoenix Abbott (Loose forward)
- (New Zealand) Senita Lauaki (Loose forward)
- (New Zealand) Kieran McClea (Halfback)
- (New Zealand) Austin Anderson (Midfielder)
- (New Zealand) Nic Sauira (Midfielder/Outside back)
- (New Zealand) Sam Nemec-Vial (Outside back)

== Notable players ==
Most Games:

- 181 Aaron Smith
- 152 Ben Smith
- 138 Liam Coltman
- 127 Anton Oliver
- 124 Daniel Lienert-Brown
- 108 Jimmy Cowan
- 107 Chris King
- 102 Elliot Dixon
- 100 Ash Dixon
- 98 Carl Hoeft
- 91 Tony Brown
- 89 Lima Sopoaga
- 85 Tom Franklin
- 84 Josh Bekhuis
- 81 Carl Hayman
- 77 Taine Randell
- 72 Jeff Wilson
- 69 James Lentjes
- 68 Siate Tokolahi
- 68 Shannon Frizell
- 67 Adam Thomson
- 67 Jamie Mackintosh
- 65 Tom Donnelly
- 65 Joe Wheeler (rugby union)
- 65 Malakai Fekitoa
- 62 Waisake Naholo

== Coaches and management ==
In their first season the Highlanders were coached by Gordon Hunter before he joined the All Blacks selection panel. Glenn Ross took over in 1997, and was not reappointed for the 1998 season. Tony Gilbert was appointed for the 1998 season, and again coached the team in 1999 before being appointed co-coach for the All Blacks. Peter Sloane was appointed Gilbert's successor for the 2000 season, and also coached them in 2001 before moving to coach the Blues. Laurie Mains returned to New Zealand from South Africa to replace Sloane for the 2002 season. Mains resigned following the 2003 season after a rift between him and senior players. Greg Cooper replaced Mains and coached the team from 2003 until 2007, when he left the franchise to take up the assistant coaches position with the Blues. Glenn Moore coached the club from 2008 through until 2010, when he was relieved of his duties after the club posted only 10 wins against 29 losses in his three years in charge. His replacement was former All Black flanker Jamie Joseph, who coached between 2011 and 2016. Tony Brown took over as head coach in 2017 he then left to join Joseph in Japan and was replaced by Aaron Mauger who coached between 2018 and 2020. Tony Brown again took over as head coach for 2021 and 2022.

On 21 June 2022, the Highlanders announced that Clarke Dermody had been appointed as head coach of the franchise for a period of three years (2023–2025).

In July 2024 it was announced that Jamie Joseph would replace Clarke Dermody as Head Coach with Dermody stepping back to an Assistant Coach role.

Highlanders coaches by date, matches and win percentage*
Coach	Period	G	W	D	L	%
Gordon Hunter	1996	11	5	0	6	45.45
Glenn Ross	1997	11	3	0	8	27.27
Tony Gilbert	1998–1999	25	16	0	9	64.00
Peter Sloane	2000–2001	23	12	0	11	52.17
Laurie Mains	2002–2003	23	14	0	9	60.87
Greg Cooper	2004–2007	48	21	2	25	43.75
Glenn Moore	2008–2010	39	10	0	29	25.64
Jamie Joseph	2011–2016, 2025-	126	61	0	65	48.41
Tony Brown	2017	16	11	0	5	68.75
Aaron Mauger (Note: One match was cancelled and called a draw due to the 2019 Christchurch Mosque Shootings and is not included in the table.)	2018–2020	47	20	3	24	42.55
Tony Brown	2021–2022	23	7	0	16	30.43
Clarke Dermody (Note: Dermody assumed the head coach role of the Highlanders during Super Rugby Trans-Tasman whilst Tony Brown returned to Japan for international coaching duties.)	2021 (interim) 2023–2024	14	8	0	6	57.14
Totals (1996–present)^{*}		406	188	5	213	46.31
Updated to: 24 April 2023

Notes:

^* Official Super Rugby competition matches only, including finals.

== Bibliography ==
- Gifford, Phil (2004). The Passion – The Stories Behind 125 years of Canterbury Rugby. Wilson Scott Publishing. ISBN 0-9582535-1-X.
- Howitt, Bob (2005). SANZAR Saga – Ten Years of Super 12 and Tri-Nations Rugby. Harper Collins Publishers. ISBN 1-86950-566-2.
- McIlraith, Matt (2005). Ten Years of Super 12. Hodder Moa. ISBN 1-86971-025-8.

Preceded by (Australia) Waratahs	Super Rugby Champions; 2015 (First title)	Succeeded by (New Zealand) Hurricanes
