= Super Round =

Rugby Event

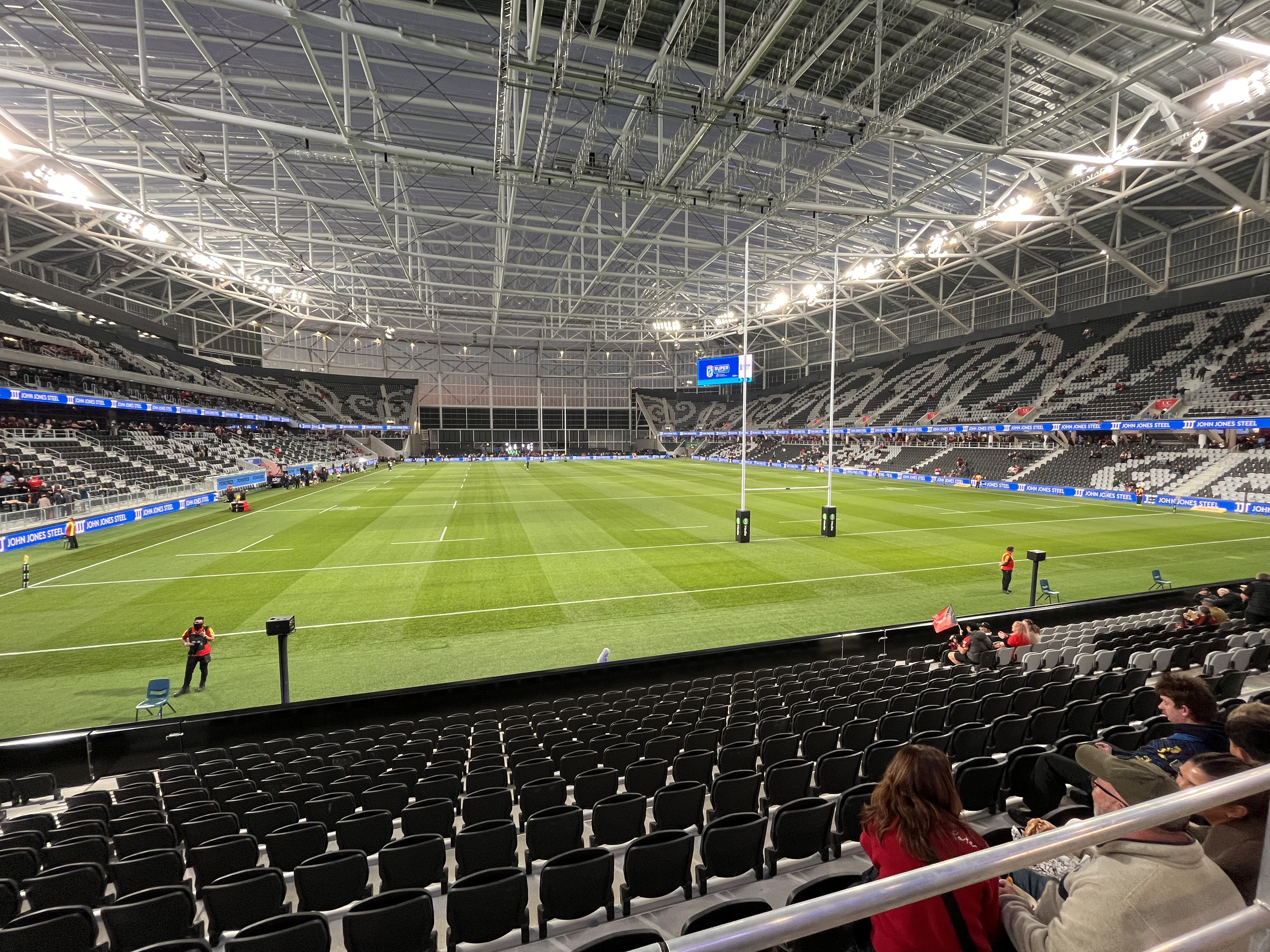
Te Kaha, the host of Super Round since 2026.

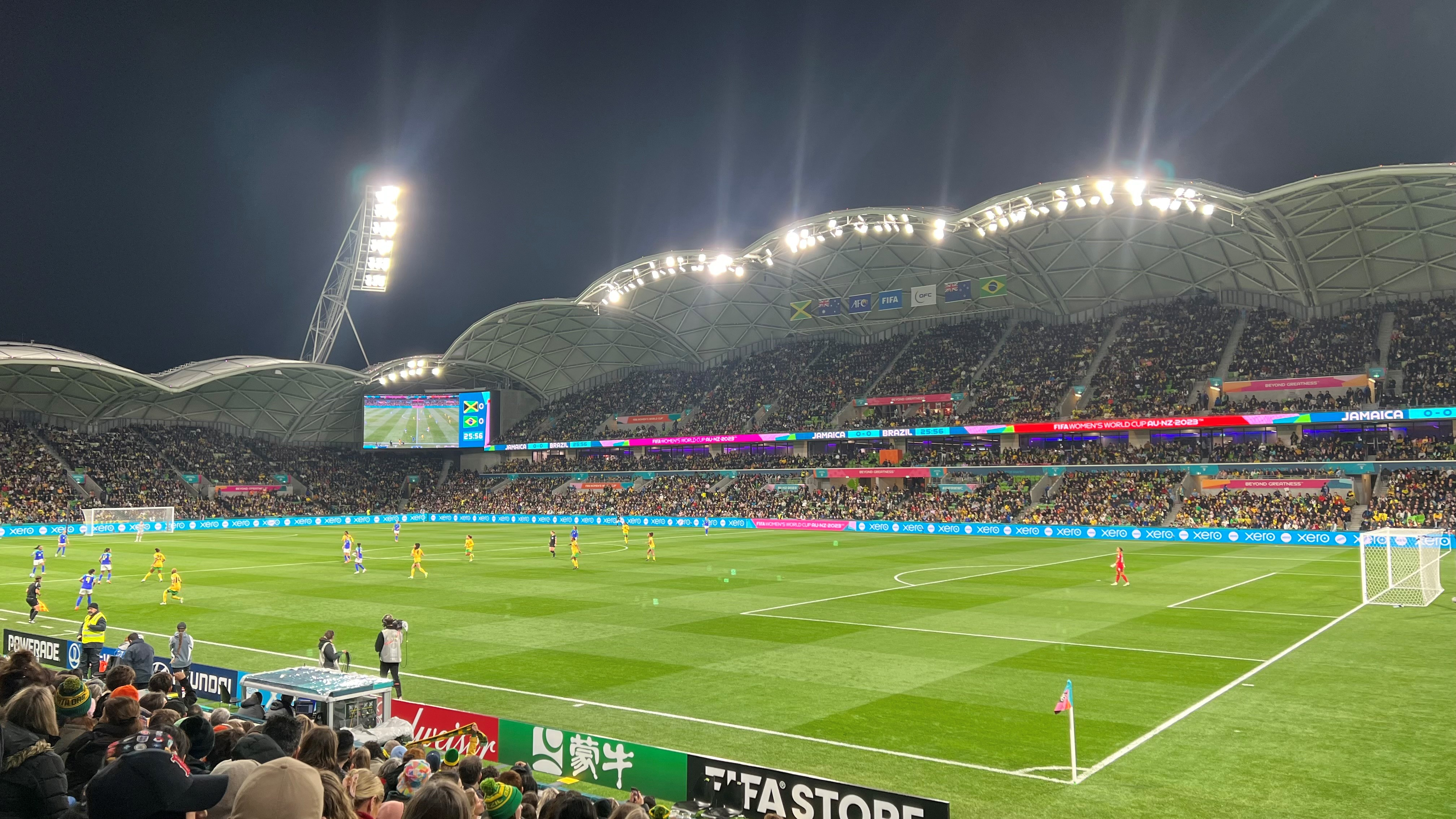
Melbourne Rectangular Stadium, the host of Super Round between 2022 and 2024.

The Super Round, also referred to as the Super Round Melbourne (2022–2024), is an event in the Super Rugby Pacific in which all fixtures for one round of the season are organised to be played at one venue. This event is in contrast with the rest of the regular season, which is played in a home-and-away format. With the original idea stemming from the English Super League (rugby league) in the late 2000s, the concept was introduced by the Australian-based National Rugby League (rugby league) for their 2019 season before being introduced into the Super Rugby Pacific for their inaugural season (2022).

Following the axing of Melbourne-based Super Rugby franchise, the Rebels, and the expiry of the events hosting in Melbourne, it was revealed in late 2024 that Super Round would be dropped for the following season (2025). However it was expected to return for 2026. In August 2025, the Super Rugby confirmed that Super Round would return for 2026, with a new host: Te Kaha, Christchurch.

== Background and reception ==
Although originating in England's Super League competition, the concept was "owned" by New Zealand Rugby (NZR). New Zealand Rugby licensed out the concept to Australian events company TEG Sport (owned by Ticketek), whom in turn negotiated a two-year deal with Victoria's state government-owned tourism and events company, Visit Victoria, to bring the event to Melbourne. The event was also made possible from the state government's "Major Events Fund" initiative. All New Zealand teams who had to surrender home games were reportedly given a flat fee of about A$300,000 in compensation for lost gate revenue.

=== Reception ===
The Super Round was heavily criticised by The New Zealand Herald upon its first year for its location (Melbourne, 2022–2024) and its low attendances. Calling the event a "flop" and "ill-conceived", the publication pointed out the conflict between hosting the event in a city dominated by sport, particularly the local sport of Australian rules football, which hosts ten of the Australian Football League's (AFL) eighteen professional teams. Speaking on the Breakfast with Baz & Izzy radio show, former New Zealand fullback Israel Dagg praised the Super Round idea and also criticised the event for its poor attendances and location. Dagg also mentioned Perth, Western Australia, as a more attractive location to host the event. In 2023, Australian sports website, The Roar, called the concept a "winner", but with "far more potential than what has been delivered so far."

Following the first Super Round in New Zealand's new Te Kaha stadium, the event was ordered to stay by multiple sources. Code Sports praised the success of the event and stated: "Sorry Australia, but Christchurch has revived the spirit and heartbeat of Super Rugby, and needs to be the home of Super Round in perpetuity." The Sydney Morning Herald wrote that despite Australian teams failing to win, Super Round in Christchurch was a major success, even labelling it "the best few days in Super Rugby Pacific's short history". Rugby.com.au said that the new location had "brought energy and life to Super Rugby regular season games that has been rarely seen, taking over the city for the long weekend."

== List of Super Rounds ==
Year	Stadium	Location	Country	Days	Total attendance	Avg attendance	Ref.
2022	Melbourne Rectangular Stadium (AAMI Park)	Olympic Boulevard, Melbourne, Victoria	Australia	3 (Note: There was a scheduled match between Moana Pasifika and the Force to be held on 22 April 2022, but due to several Force players testing positive for COVID-19, the match was postponed, and rescheduled for 24 May 2022. The venue was changed from Melbourne Rectangular Stadium to Mount Smart Stadium.)	30,000	10,000	
2023	Melbourne Rectangular Stadium (AAMI Park)	Olympic Boulevard, Melbourne, Victoria	Australia	3	26,400 (confirmed) (Note: Full attendance figures were not published for the 2023 event.)	Unknown	
2024	Melbourne Rectangular Stadium (AAMI Park)	Olympic Boulevard, Melbourne, Victoria	Australia	3	32,152	10,717	
2025	Not held						
2026	Te Kaha (One New Zealand Stadium)	Christchurch City, Canterbury	New Zealand	3	73,187	24,396	
2027	Te Kaha (One New Zealand Stadium)	Christchurch City, Canterbury	New Zealand	3	TBD		

== See also ==
- Magic Weekend – English Super League's equivalent. Original model.
- Magic Round – National Rugby League's equivalent; first introduced in 2019.
- Gather Round – Australian Football League's equivalent; first introduced in 2023.
- Unite Round – A-League's equivalent; first introduced in 2023–24.
