= Scott Hansen (rugby union) =

- Full name: Scott Leon Richard Hansen
- Born: 24 January 1976 (age 50)

Rugby union career
- Position: Halfback
Provincial / State sides
Years	Team	Apps	(Points)
1994–96	Canterbury	13	(5)
Super Rugby
Years	Team	Apps	(Points)
1996	Crusaders	2	(0)
Coaching career
- Years: Team
- 2013–14: Canterbury (high performance)
- 2014: Canada (backs coach)
- 2015–16: Leicester Tigers (defensive coach)
- 2017: Kobelco Steelers (assistant coach)
- 2018–19: Sunwolves (assistant coach)
- 2019–22: Japan (assistant coach)
- 2020–22: Crusaders (assistant coach)
- 2023–26: New Zealand (assistant coach)

Scott Leon Richard Hansen (born 24 January 1976) is a New Zealand rugby union coach and former professional player. He was an assistant coach with the New Zealand national team, the All Blacks, from 2023 to 2026.

== Biography ==
Hansen was raised in Christchurch, attending Christchurch Boys High School.

=== Playing career ===
A New Zealand under-19s & New Zealand under-21s representative halfback, Hansen played with Christchurch's Marist club and featured for Canterbury from 1994 to 1996. He played twice for the Crusaders during the 1996 Super 12 season, as the starting halfback in home fixtures against the Brumbies and Western Province.

=== Coaching ===
Hansen began his coaching career under Scott Robertson at Canterbury. He has had roles outside New Zealand with Leicester Tigers, Kobelco Steelers, Sunwolves and the national teams of Japan and Canada. In 2020, Hansen became a Crusaders assistant coach and is credited with putting together the game plan for their 2022 Super Rugby Pacific final win over the Blues.

He joined Robertson's All Blacks coaching team in 2023. When Robertson was replaced by Dave Rennie for the 2026 season Hansen was not retained by the new coach.

In May 2026 it was announced that Scott Hansen would take over the Crusaders Head Coach role for 2027.
