= Dylan Eti =

New Zealand rugby union player

- Born: 13 November 2005 (age 21) New Zealand
- School: St Peter's School, Cambridge

Rugby union career
- Position: Lock
- Current team: Chiefs, Waikato
Senior career
Years	Team	Apps	(Points)
2025–	Waikato	8	(5)
2026–	Chiefs		
- Correct as of 12 November 2025
International career
Years	Team	Apps	(Points)
2025	New Zealand U20	1	(0)
- Correct as of 12 November 2025

Dylan Eti (born 13 November 2005) is a New Zealand rugby union player, who plays for the Chiefs and Waikato. His preferred position is lock.

== Early career ==
Eti attended St Peter's School, Cambridge after previously attending Ōtorohanga College. After leaving school he joined up with the Chiefs academy, representing their U18 side in 2023, and their U20 side in 2025. In 2025, he also represented the New Zealand U20 side.

== Professional career ==
Eti has represented Waikato in the National Provincial Championship since 2025, being named as a replacement player for the 2025 Bunnings NPC. He was named in the Chiefs wider training group for the 2026 Super Rugby Pacific season.
