= Nic Sauira =

Fijian rugby union player

- Born: 1 February 2003 (age 23) Fiji
- School: Nelson College

Rugby union career
- Position(s): Centre, Wing, Fullback
- Current team: Tasman
Senior career
Years	Team	Apps	(Points)
2024–	Tasman	21	(15)
- Correct as of 9 October 2026

Nic Sauira (born 1 February 2003) is a Fijian rugby union player who plays for Tasman in the Bunnings NPC. He can play in the Centre, Wing and Fullback positions.

== Career ==
Sauira was named in the Tasman development squad for the 2024 Bunnings NPC, he made his debut for the side in Round 4 against Bay of Plenty, coming off the bench in a 34–15 win for the Mako.

Sauira was educated at Nelson College from 2016 to 2021.
