= 2026 Super Rugby AUS =

Rugby union competition edition

- Countries: Australia
- Date: 12 September – 3 October 2026
- Champions: Force (1st title)
- Runners-up: Waratahs
- Matches played: 7
- Tries scored: 63 (average 9 per match)

Official website
- www.rugby.com.au

2026 Super Rugby AUS (Note: Known as the 2026 Swyftx Super Rugby AUS for sponsorship reasons.) was the second edition of Australia's national rugby union competition, Super Rugby AUS, organised by Rugby Australia (RA), involving four of Australia's Super Rugby teams: the Brumbies, the Force, the Reds and the Waratahs. The season began on 12 September and finished 3 October 2026 with the Grand Final between the first-placed Force and the second-placed Waratahs.

The Waratahs were the defending champions, having defeated the Force in the previous year's inaugural edition 33–26.

On 3 October, the Force defeated the Waratahs 53–26 at the Hale School in Perth's Wembley Downs.

== Competition and format ==
The schedule and format was announced in early August 2026, and remained unchanged from the previous season: a single round-robin format during the regular season, with each team playing the other three teams once across three rounds. Following the conclusion of the round-robin stage, the top two teams on the competition ladder advance to a single Grand Final, to be held on Saturday, 3 October 2026.

=== Law variations ===
Ahead of the first round, sports journalist Brett McKay confirmed via Twitter that new laws would be in place for the 2026 tournament. These included:

- Increased reserves in matchday squads (up from eight to ten).
- Following a tactical substitution, the replacement player may be withdrawn and the original player reinstated in the event of an injury (the previous law had only applied to the front row).
- Following a try, the team restarting play must remain at the half-way line, rather than retreating behind the posts, with only one defending player eligible to advance in attempt to charge the conversion.
- Free kicks will be awarded for an incorrectly aligned scrum and for accidental offside offences. Where a free kick is awarded at a scrum, the point of sanction will move to the back of the scrum.

== Venues and personnel ==
In the schedule announcement, all venues was confirmed. The Brumbies would host their first round fixture against the Waratahs at Bungendore Sports Hub in Bungendore on the outskirts of the Australian Capital Territory. Their second venue was Viking Park in Wanniassa. The Force, whom had a reduced amount of home games from the previous season, host the Brumbies at Halesworth Park in Perth's Butler suburb, the home ground of the North Coast Rugby Union Football Club. The Reds host two games, one a their headquarters: Ballymore Stadium, Herston, and their second round clash against the Waratahs at Gallas Fox Park in Queensland's Maranoa Region. The match and venue were confirmed in June 2026 and form a larger partnership between the New South Wales Rugby Union and the Queensland Rugby Union with Santos, and is part of the annual "Festival of Rugby" event. The venue had previously held Reds pre-season trials. The Waratahs' sole home game was at Pittwater Park, Warriewood.

=== Overview ===
Team	Stadia information		Coach	Captain
Team	Stadia	Capacity	Coach	Captain
Brumbies	Viking Park, Wanniassa	7,000	Stephen Larkham	Toby MacPherson
Brumbies	Bungendore Sports Hub, Bungendore	—N/a	Stephen Larkham	Toby MacPherson
Reds	Ballymore Stadium, Herston	8,000	Vern Cotter	Lachie Anderson (Note: Named captain for round one.); Matt Faessler (Note: Named captain for rounds two and three.)
Reds	Gallas Fox Park, Roma	3,000	Vern Cotter	Lachie Anderson; Matt Faessler
Force	Halesworth Park, Butler	—N/a	Damian Steele	Nic Dolly
Waratahs	Pittwater Park, Warriewood	10,000	Lachlan McCaffrey	Eamon Doyle

2026 Super Rugby AUS venues
- Brumbies Reds Force Waratahs

== Ladder ==
Pos	Team	Pld	W	D	L	PF	PA	PD	TF	TA	TB	LB	Pts	Qualification
1	Force (C)	3	3	0	0	86	52	+34	14	8	1	0	13	Grand Final
2	Waratahs	3	2	0	1	97	55	+42	15	9	2	1	11	Grand Final
3	Brumbies	3	1	0	2	64	104	−40	10	16	0	0	4	
4	Reds	3	0	0	3	73	109	−36	11	17	0	2	2	

Source: Rugby.com.au
(C) Champion

== Fixtures ==
=== Round 1 ===
12 September
13:30 AEST (UTC+10)

(1 BP) Reds	28–29	Force
Try: Robinson 7' c Takai 32' c Ryan 35' c Campbell 44' c Con: Lynagh (3/3) 8', 32', 34'; Volavola (1/1) 43'	Report	Try: Hastie (2) 26' m, 64' m McLaughlin-Phillips 40' c Baker 50' m Alcock 80+1' c Con: McLaughlin-Phillips (2/5) 39', 80+1'

Ballymore Stadium, Herston
Attendance: 1,567
Referee: Reuben Keane

13 September
14:00 AEST (UTC+10)

Brumbies	19–38	Waratahs (1 BP)
Try: Thorn 24' c Reilly 54' m Baxter 75' c Con: Edmed (1/2) 25'; Shaw (1/1) 76'	Report	Try: Vaha'akolo (2) 4' c, 37' c Wilson (2) 13' c, 30' c Smiler Ah-Kiong 17' m Serfontein 64' m Con: Harvey (4/6) 5', 14', 31', 39'

Bungendore Sports Hub, Bungendore
Attendance: 3,000
Referee: George Myers

=== Round 2 ===
19 September
17:45 AEST (UTC+10)

Reds	19–47	Waratahs (1 BP)
Try: Ryan 57' c Bryant 77' c Flanagan Smith 80+2' m Con: Lynagh (1/1) 58'; Volavola (1/2) 78'	Report	Try: Serfontein 5' c Harvey 15' c Dobbins 43' c Smiler Ah-Kiong 46' m Wilson 50' c Le Maitre 70' c Dillon 73' c Con: Harvey (4/5) 6', 16', 44', 51'; Grover (2/2) 71', 74'

Gallas Fox Park, Roma
Attendance: 4,000
Referee: George Myers

20 September
13:30 AWST (UTC+8)

(1 BP) Force	40–12	Brumbies
Try: Leahy 7' c Daly (2) 13' c, 50' m Hastie (2) 21' c, 40' c Epenisa 40' c Con: Beale (5/6) 8', 14', 22', 41', 41'	Report	Try: Nelson 60' m Breen 72' c Con: O. Shaw (1/1) 73'

Halesworth Park, Butler
Attendance: 1,000
Referee: Jack Larkin

=== Round 3 ===
27 September
13:00 AEST (UTC+10)

(1 BP) Waratahs	12–17	Force
Try: Dobbins (2) 13' c, 29' c Con: Burey (2/2) 14', 30'	Report	Try: Hastie 23' c Dolly 41' m Fakafanua 49' m Con: Beale (1/3) 24'

Pittwater Park, Warriewood
Referee: Jack Larkin

27 September
14:35 AEST (UTC+10)

Brumbies	33–26	Reds (1 BP)
Try: Toole 29' m MacPherson 34' c Pritchard 42' c Breen 53' c Reilly 57' c Con: Edmed (4/5) 34', 43', 53', 58'	Report	Try: Ryan 21' c Faessler 39' m McDermott 74' c Robinson 79' c Con: Volavola (1/2) 22'; Stewart (1/1) 74'; Ryan (1/1) 80'

Viking Park, Wanniassa
Referee: Damián Schneider

== Grand Final ==
3 October
14:30 AWST (UTC+8)

Force	53–26	Waratahs
Try: Iose 3' c Pietsch (3) 10' m, 65' m, 70' c Dolly 15' c Charlie (2) 36' c, 72' m Daly 46' m Alcock 57' m Con: McLaughlin-Phillips (4/9) 4', 16', 36', 70'	Report	Try: Bird 39' m Smiler Ah-Kiong 54' c Finau 67' c Tonga 76' c Con: Burey (1/2) 54'; Dillon (2/2) 68', 77'

Hale School, Wembley Downs
Attendance: 2,500
Referee: Reuben Keane

Force	Waratahs

FB	15	Mac Grealy
RW	14	Dylan Pietsch
OC	13	Boston Fakafanua
IC	12	Kurtley Beale
LW	11	Wallace Charlie	(substituted off) 73'
FH	10	Harry McLaughlin-Phillips
SH	9	Nathan Hastie	(substituted off) 66'
N8	8	Jackson Iose	(substituted off) 51'
OF	7	Jack Daly	(substituted off) 66'
BF	6	Kane Koteka	(substituted off) 71'
RL	5	Will Harris
LL	4	Zak Healey
TP	3	Misinale Epenisa	(substituted off) 47'
HK	2	Nic Dolly (c)	(substituted off) 50'
LP	1	Tom Robertson	(substituted off) 60'
Replacements:
HK	16	Albert Alcock	(substituted on) 50'
PR	17	Max Sawers	(substituted on) 60'
PR	18	Bradley Kuhn	(substituted on) 47'	(substituted off) 74'
LK	19	Regin Pratt	(substituted on) 71'
BR	20	Aden Ekanayake	(substituted on) 51'
WG	21	Ronan Leahy
BR	22	Nate Gallagher		(substituted on) 74'
BR	23	Tim Sail	(substituted on) 66'
SH	24	Luke Aiken	(substituted on) 66'
FH	25	Evan Hooper	(substituted on) 73'
Coach:
Damian Steele

FB	15	Latrell Smiler Ah-Kiong
RW	14	Freedom Vaha'akolo
OC	13	Nick Chan	(substituted off) 64'
IC	12	Charlie Bird	(substituted off) 64'
LW	11	Otto Serfontein
FH	10	Max Burey	(substituted off) 51'
SH	9	Teddy Wilson
N8	8	Isaac Fonua	(substituted off) 40'
OF	7	Marshall Le Maitre	(substituted off) 64'
BF	6	Joe Mangelsdorf
RL	5	Tom Girle	(substituted off) 52'
LL	4	Eamon Doyle (c)
TP	3	Edwin Langi	(substituted off) 47'
HK	2	Ethan Dobbins
LP	1	Tom Lambert	(substituted off) 58'
Replacements:
HK	16	Folau Fainga'a	(substituted on) 64'
PR	17	Brady Dawson	(substituted on) 58'
PR	18	Will Goddard	(substituted on) 47'
LK	19	Toby Brial	(substituted on) 64'
BR	20	Angus Scott-Young	(substituted on) 51'
BR	21	Luke Reimer	(substituted on) 40'
HK	22	Oniti Finau	(substituted on) 64'
SH	23	Ben Fuhiniu	(substituted on) 64'
WG	24	Hadley Tonga	(substituted on) 64'
FH	25	Joe Dillon	(substituted on) 51'
Coach:
Lachlan McCaffrey

Man of the Match:
Will Harris (Western Force)

== Awards ==
=== Player of the Year ===
Player of the Tournament
Player	Position	Team
Boston Fakafanua	Centre	Force

== Squads ==
Brumbies squad
Forwards
- Tevita Alatini
- Finn Baxter
- Liam Bowron
- Darcy Breen
- Oscar Cleary
- Darcy Fogarty
- Nick Frost
- Lington Ieli
- Ewald Kruger
- Eli Langi
- Lachlan Lonergan
- Tavita Loughland
- Toby MacPherson
- Judah Saumaisue
- Lachlan Shaw
- TJ Talaileva
- Josh Townsend
- Tu'ukalilkali Vaipulu
- Rhys van Nek
- Jack Wright
Backs
- Dylan Bretton
- Tane Edmed
- David Feliuai
- Jarrah McLeod
- Dan Nelson
- Chace Oates
- Kadin Pritchard
- Triston Reilly
- Ollie Sapsford
- Oscar Shaw
- Moses Sorovi
- Klayton Thorn
- Corey Toole
- Will Trostel
Coach
Stephen Larkham

Force squad
Forwards
- Albert Alcock
- Jasper Asi
- Seta Baker
- Nick Champion de Crespigny
- Jack Daly
- Nic Dolly
- Aden Ekanayake
- Misinale Epenisa
- Sam Faoagali
- Nate Gallagher
- Will Harris
- Zak Healey
- Trevor Hosea
- Jackson Iose
- Kane Koteka
- Bradley Kuhn
- Anthony Passi
- Regin Pratt
- Tom Robertson
- Tim Sail
- Max Sawers
- Wil Taylor
Backs
- Luke Aiken
- Tama Anderson
- Kurtley Beale
- Wallace Charlie
- Boston Fakafanua
- Mac Grealy
- Nathan Hastie
- Evan Hooper
- Ronan Leahy
- Zac Lomax
- Harry McLaughlin-Phillips
- James O'Connor
- Dylan Pietsch
- Tamarangi Tunui
Coach
Damian Steele

Reds squad
Forwards
- George Blake
- Nick Bloomfield
- Joe Brial
- Charlie Brosnan
- John Bryant
- Matt Faessler
- Teina Graham
- John Grenfell
- Kenny Harris
- Zac Hough
- Trevor King
- Jake Kurbatoff
- Vaiuta Latu
- Zane Nonggorr
- Tom Robinson
- Will Ross
- Dom Thygesen
- Harrison Usher
Backs
- Lachie Anderson
- Jock Campbell
- Mosiah Christian
- Alex Flanagan Smith
- Josh Flook
- David Fusitu'a
- Heath Lindenmayer
- Tom Lynagh
- Will McCulloch
- Flynn McDermott
- Sefa Naivalu
- Jake Pappin
- Izaia Perese
- Tim Ryan
- Cooper Stewart
- Josh Takai
- Ben Volavola
Coach
Vern Cotter

Waratahs squad
Forwards
- Miles Amatosero
- Toby Brial
- Luca Cleverley
- Brady Dawson
- Ethan Dobbins
- Eamon Doyle
- Folau Fainga'a
- Oniti Finau
- Isaac Fonua
- Tom Girle
- Will Goddard
- Isaac Aedo Kailea
- Tom Lambert
- Edwin Langi
- Marshall Le Maitre
- Joe Mangelsdorf
- Tyler Maybery
- Apolosi Ranawai
- Luke Reimer
- Pete Samu
- Angus Scott-Young
- Justice Taumoepeau
- Nate Tiitii
- Lotu Vunipolu
Backs
- Charlie Bird
- Max Burey
- Nick Chan
- Joe Dillon
- Joey Fowler
- Ben Fuhiniu
- Angus Grover
- Jack Hardy
- Sid Harvey
- Jimmy Hendren
- Nick Phipps
- George Poolman
- Otto Serfontein
- Latrell Smiler Ah-Koing
- Hadley Tonga
- Freedom Vaha'akolo
- Teddy Wilson
Coach
Lachlan McCaffrey
