= Western Force =

Rugby union club in Perth, Western Australia

- Union: Rugby Australia (Western Australia)
- Founded: 2005; 21 years ago
- Location: Perth, Western Australia
- Region: Western Australia, Australia
- Ground: HBF Park (Capacity: 20,500)
- Chairman: Anthony Flannery
- CEO: John Hartman
- Director of Rugby: Matt Hodgson
- Coach: Simon Cron
- Captain: TBA
- Most caps: Matt Hodgson (140)
- Top scorer: Cameron Shepherd (370)
- League: Super Rugby Pacific
- 2026: 7th overall Playoffs: DNQ
1st kit	2nd kit

Official website
- westernforce.rugby

The Western Force is an Australian professional rugby union team based in Perth, Western Australia, currently competing in Super Rugby Pacific. They previously played in Super Rugby from 2006 until they were axed from the competition in 2017. Following their axing they played in the National Rugby Championship in 2018 and 2019, replacing the Perth Spirit, and Global Rapid Rugby from 2018 to 2020, an Indo-Pacific competition organised by Andrew Forrest.

Following the cancellation of both the 2020 Super Rugby season and 2020 Global Rapid Rugby season due to the COVID-19 pandemic, the Western Force were invited to compete in the 2020 Super Rugby AU season, a domestic competition organised by Rugby Australia to replace the cancelled Super Rugby season. The Force competed in the 2021 Super Rugby AU season and Super Rugby Trans-Tasman, before being confirmed that their return to Super Rugby will be permanent in the revamped 2022 Super Rugby Pacific season.

== History ==
=== The first season ===
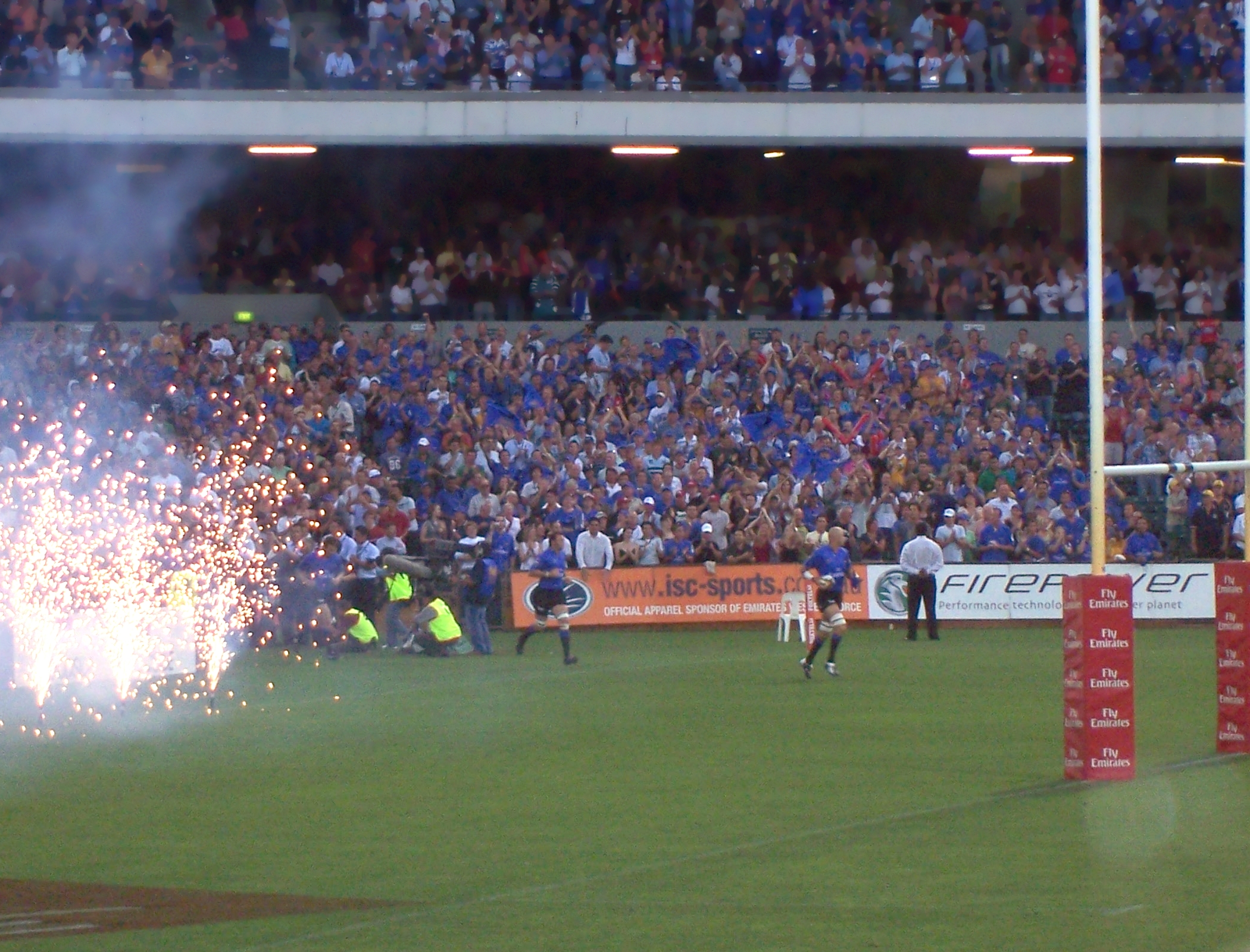
The Force run out in their first game against the Brumbies in 2006

On 10 February the Western Force made their 2006 season rugby debut against the Brumbies at a near sold out Subiaco Oval in Perth, losing 25–10. After this result, the Force had a difficult debut in Super 14. A one-sided loss to the Hurricanes and an ugly loss at home to the Chiefs in Perth followed. Many fans were unimpressed, with only approximately 23,000 turning up to watch a match against the Bulls. On 31 March, in front of 24,000, the Force came closest to their first win, losing 26–25 to the Stormers at Subiaco Oval. This was after leading 10–0 early on in the match. This was the Force's first competition point ever, and was the longest it had ever taken a side to get a point in Super rugby history (8 rounds/7 matches).

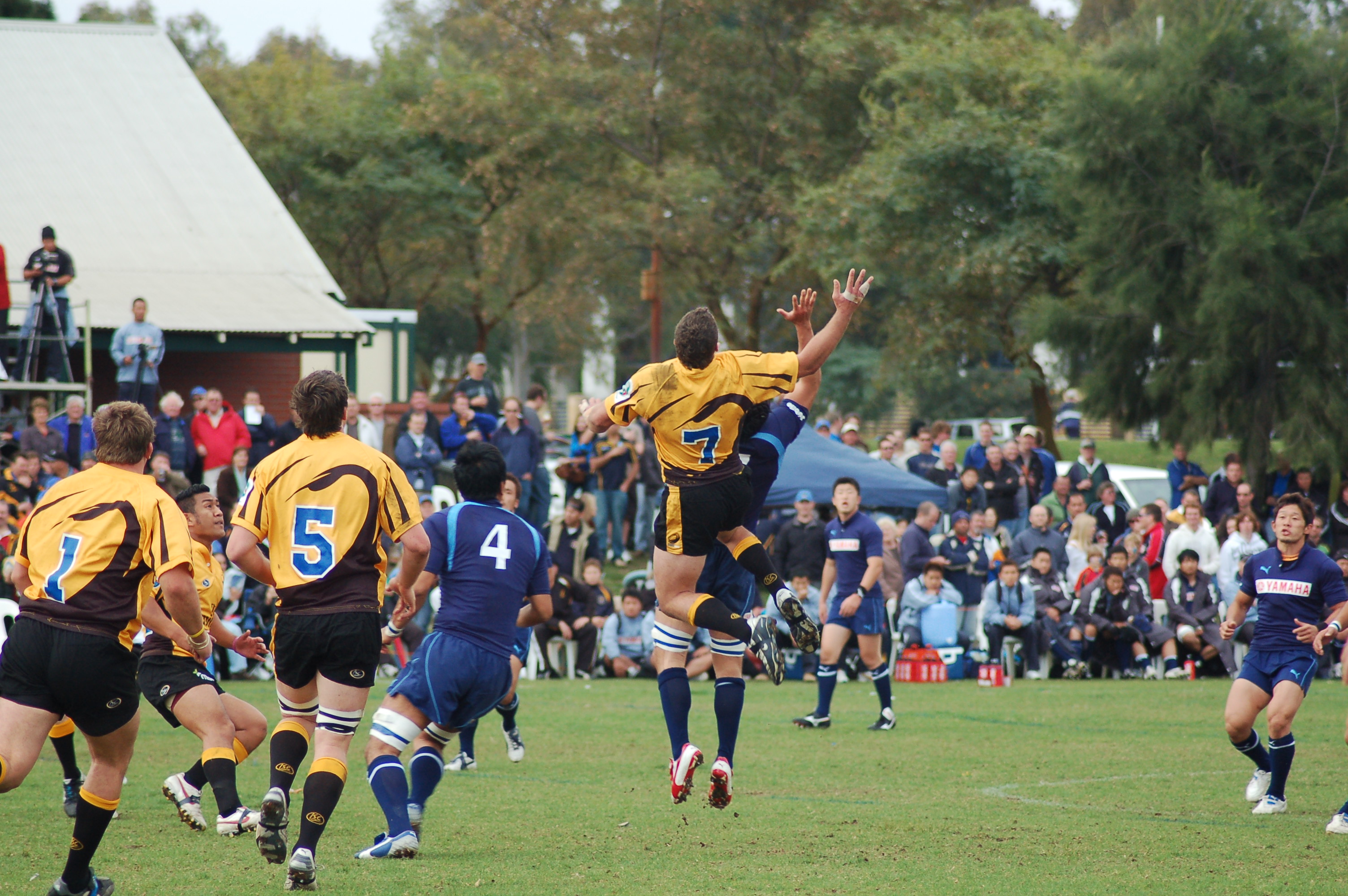
Western Force Gold against Yamaha Júbilo in 2006

On 21 April a crowd of 32,231 saw the Force nearly pull off the upset of the year, drawing 23-all with the undefeated defending champion Crusaders. Though the Force were leading 7–0 after several minutes the feeling was still that the Crusaders would win, especially after they scored a try seconds later to make it 7–5. Only when the Force had blown the score out to 17–5 did anyone begin to talk of an upset. Leading 20–8 at half time the Force did not hold on for the win after the Crusaders scored two tries and a penalty within the closing half. At 23-all with seconds left the Force crashed over the line but were denied by the television match official.

Two days after the draw with the Crusaders, the Force were able to sign rising star Matt Giteau from the Brumbies, effective with the 2007 season. Giteau, whose contract with the Brumbies ended after the 2006 season, inked a three-year deal reportedly worth A$4.5 million, making him the highest-paid player in the history of any Australian football code.

On Saturday 6 May the Force announced they had managed to sign another player, Reds winger Drew Mitchell. However, during the same week the Force were fined $110,000 after an "independent committee found that Rugby WA had entered a negotiation process with Al Kanaar in a way that was contrary to and in breach of the contracting protocols." The Force notched up their first win by defeating the Cheetahs 16–14 on 6 May.

=== Super Rugby years ===
The Western Force continued to play in Super Rugby until the 2017 season. During this time they struggled to achieve much success, failing to qualify for the playoffs in a single season. Their best season came in 2007, where they finished 7th out of 14 teams. Ahead of the 2018 Super Rugby season, SANZAAR made the decision to reduce the competition from 18 to 15 teams, deciding to cut 2 South African teams and 1 Australian team. On 11 August 2017 it was announced that the Western Force would be the Australian team to be axed from Super Rugby.

=== Global Rapid Rugby and National Rugby Championship ===
In September 2017, Australian billionaire Andrew Forrest made plans to launch an Indo-Pacific Rugby tournament, consisting of the Western Force and other teams from the Indo-Pacific region. Several countries – such as Hong Kong, Malaysia and Singapore – expressed an interest in joining the new competition.

While organisation of the Indo-Pacific tournament was still underway, Andrew Forrest announced that the Western Force would play a series of matches in 2018 in what would be known as World Series Rugby. The Force played matches against Fiji A, Tonga A, Samoa A, the second tier national sides of those countries, along with the Hong Kong national team, Super Rugby sides Melbourne Rebels and the Crusaders, and Japanese club Panasonic Wild Knights.

Andrew Forrest's Indo-Pacific Rugby tournament was officially announced as Global Rapid Rugby and began in 2019. The inaugural 2019 season consisted of a series of showcase matches with the competition adopting a full home and away round-robin format for the 2020 season. The Western Force played in Global Rapid Rugby against teams from Fiji, Hong Kong, Japan, Malaysia, Samoa and Singapore.

During this time the Western Force also played in the 2018 and 2019 National Rugby Championship (NRC) seasons, replacing Perth Spirit, who had previously acted as a feeder team for the Force during their Super Rugby years. The National Rugby Championship was Australia's second-tier competition below Super Rugby, taking place after the Super Rugby season and featuring players who were not selected to play for the Australian national team in the test season, similar to New Zealand's Mitre 10 Cup and South Africa's Currie Cup. The Western Force finished 3rd in the 2018 season, being knocked out in the semi-finals, and won the 2019 season, beating the Canberra Vikings 41–3 in the final.

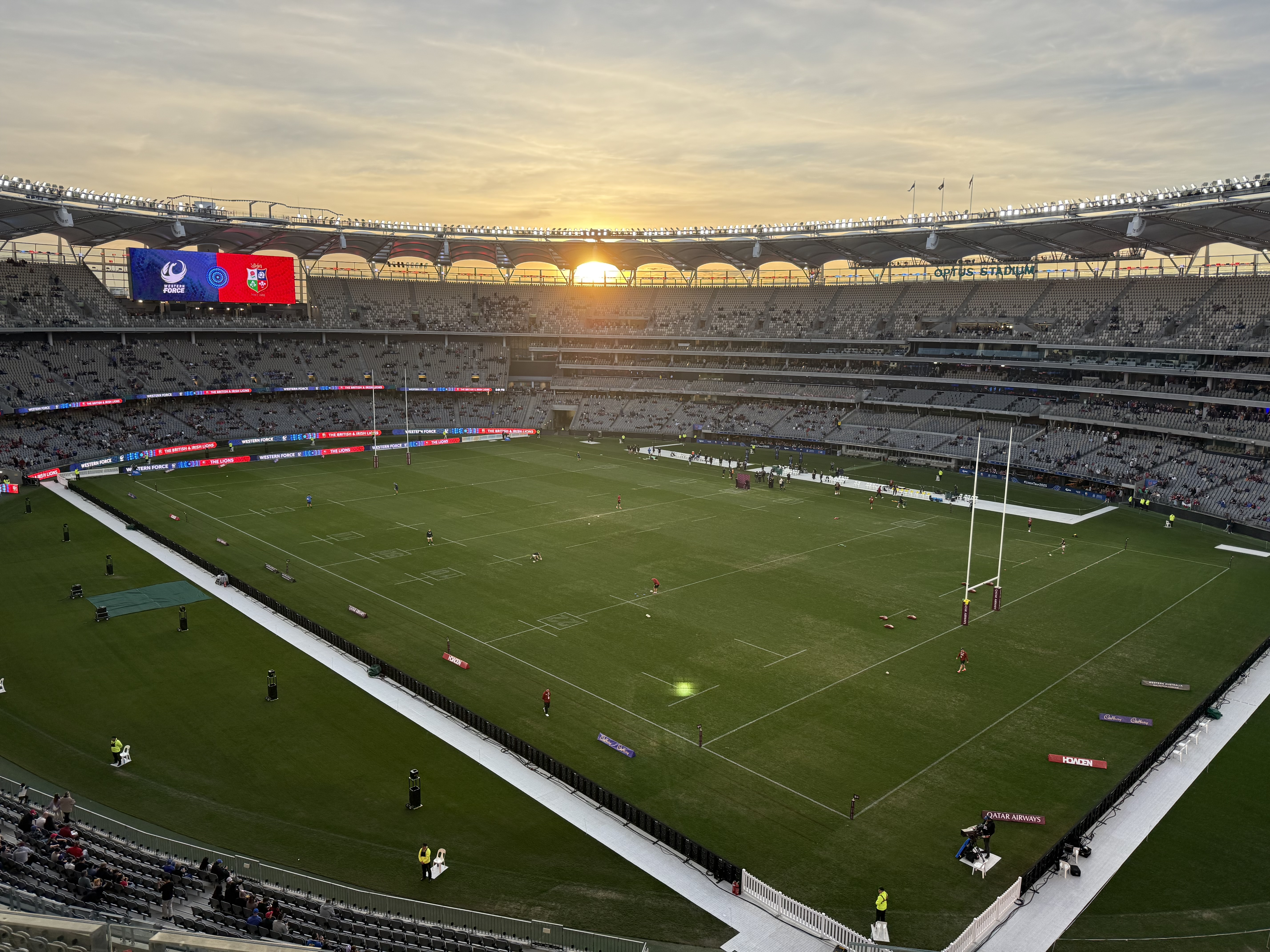
The Force hosted the British & Irish Lions at Perth Stadium in 2025

=== Return to Super Rugby ===
Due to the COVID-19 pandemic, the 2020 Global Rapid rugby season, which the Western Force were competing in, was cancelled. The pandemic had also caused the cancellation of the 2020 Super Rugby season, and international travel restrictions meant that it was unfeasible for the competition to continue in its current state, as it spanned multiple countries. Due to this, Rugby Australia (RA) launched a domestic competition known as Super Rugby AU. The Western Force were soon announced as one of five teams entering the competition. The inaugural season (2020) ran from 3 July to 19 September 2020.

The Western Force competed in the 2021 Super Rugby AU season, along with Super Rugby Trans-Tasman, a trans-tasman competition that featured the five Super Rugby AU teams taking on the five Super Rugby Aotearoa teams.

Beginning in 2022, the Super Rugby was restructured into a twelve-team competition containing four Australian teams, one Fijian team, five New Zealand teams, and a Pacific Islands team based in New Zealand. This competition included the full-time return of the Western Force. In the inaugural season (2022), the Force finished ninth on the ladder, narrowly missing the Finals on point-difference. They recorded four wins from 14 matches, accumulating a total of 23 competition points, with notable victories over the two newest teams: Fijian Drua, Moana Pasifika; and a final-round (Round 15) victory over the Hurricanes.

In their following season (2023), the Force picked up one more win than their previous season despite being of mixed results. The Force opened their season with a 34–27 victory over Australian rivals, the Melbourne Rebels. Missing just 13 tackles to the Rebels' 35, the Force fought back a 15–3 deficit to score the final try in the 73rd minute via Jeremy Thrush. The team excelled at home, achieving four wins from four home matches at Perth Rectangular Stadium during a strong mid-season run (and five from seven in total), which included a 30–17 surprise win against the Highlanders, being described by ESPN as "their best first-half performance of the Super Rugby Pacific season". However, the young team struggled with consistency which kept them out of Finals contention.

The following two seasons (2024, 2025) were much of the same for the Western Force as compared to their previous Super Rugby Pacific seasons; the latter being marginally better in terms of points scored. 2025 also saw the Western Force rank best in the Super Rugby for lineouts won (stealing 2.07 lineouts per game, and holding the highest ratio of steals in the world for the season), and tries per game that came from the maul (which was also the highest in the world). The Force also ranked amongst the worst teams in the competition for success at the scrum, carries, metres gained, defenders beaten, and offloads.

In June 2025, the Western Force played the British & Irish Lions for just the second time in their 2025 British & Irish Lions tour of Australia. The match was played at Perth Stadium. The British & Irish Lions won the match 7–54 in front of an attendance of 46,656, the biggest crowd for a Western Force match.

Beginning in late 2025, the Western Force, alongside three Australian Super Rugby teams (Brumbies, Reds, Waratahs), began competing in the newly established Super Rugby AUS: Australia's national rugby union competition organised by Rugby Australia (RA).

== Name and colours ==
In 2005, RugbyWA unveiled the franchise team name as well as the logo, at a reception at the Burswood International Resort in Perth. Months of detailed community involvement went into selecting the name for the team. "Western Force" was chosen as the name, which best reflected the franchise's location (state) and its "values of strength, energy and community". The logo was unveiled to be a black swan, which is the state's official state emblem. The swan is set in a blue background, representing the Western Australia coastline and sky, whilst the gold represented the beaches, mineral wealth and sunshine. Some speculated that the team was going to be called the "Black Swans". The Force's jersey and naming rights sponsor was also revealed. The home jersey was unveiled on player Brendan Cannon, being blue with a black swan. Lachlan MacKay emerged with the side's alternate strip, which was gold with a black swan; black and gold being the State colours of Western Australia. The team's first jersey was auctioned off for A$30,000, and the first alternate strip was then also auctioned off for A$30,000 as well.

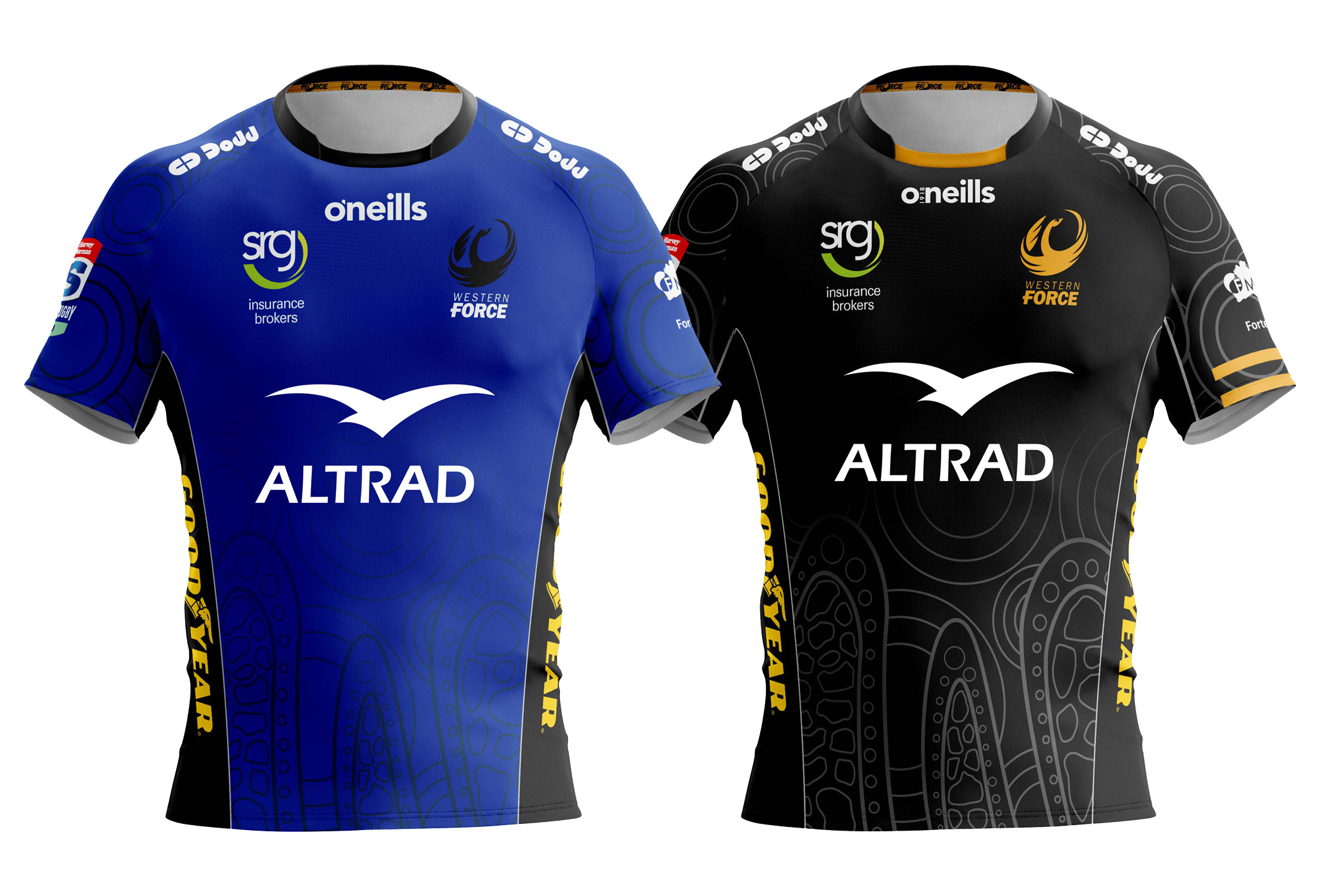
2022 Western Force kit

=== Logo ===
In March 2018, the Western Force changed their logo and jersey. The logo was very similar to the previous logo, this came after being axed from their most recent season of Super Rugby (2017).

2023

== Support ==
Shortly after RugbyWA won the fourth Australian franchise, an on-line register was set up for members to record their interest. In the space of weeks, 10,000 people had registered. When membership was officially launched in July, more than 13,000 were registered, with around 400 companies expressed interest in hospitality packages. Soon the Force had the largest membership base of any of the Australian Super 14 teams. By the time pre-season had started, the Force had 16,000 members.

Australian Rugby Union CEO Gary Flowers told the media that "people power" was a key factor in Western Australia being awarded the franchise ahead of Victoria. Prior to the announcement, more than 25,500 Western Australians signed a petition in support of their state's bid. In addition, 5,000 people, including the state's premier Dr Geoff Gallop, attended a rally at Subiaco Oval, organised by two rugby mothers "the Scrum Mums" (Jennifer Hoskins and Irma Cooper) to show how much the people of Western Australia wanted the franchise. By the end of the first season, the Force finished with the highest crowd average out of all the Australian teams, despite finishing in last place, the fans still came out to see Wallaby stars such as Matt Giteau, Drew Mitchell and Nathan Sharpe (though Mitchell and Giteau were not in the 2006 line-up).

== Region and stadium ==
Western Force venues (Perth)
Western Force venue locations

The Western Force represents the state of Western Australia, the largest and least densely populated state in the country. The Western Force have been based in Perth (the state capital), since its creation, where than three-fourths of state residents live. For the first four seasons (2006–2009), the Western Force played all of their home games at Subiaco Oval, a stadium primarily used by Australian rules football clubs, Fremantle and the West Coast Eagles of the Australian Football League (AFL). The stadium had a capacity of 43,500. The stadium was demolished in 2019.

In 2010, the Western Force permanently moved to the Perth Rectangular Stadium (known as ME Bank Stadium). As of 2019, the stadium is known as HBF Park after Western Australia's biggest health insurer took over naming rights. Between 2010 and 2011 the State government developed a masterplan for an improved rectangular stadium and then completed a business case which saw A$88 million allocated to the first stage which was to include a new permanent East stand, new lights, two video replay boards, LED signage at pitch level, replacement of the playing surface and replacement of the south scaffold stand with new scaffold. A Project Definition Plan was then completed and following this, the government allocated a further A$7.14 million to add corporate amenity including 48 corporate boxes and a 250-seat BBQ deck to the new Eastern stand. In June 2012 builder BGC were awarded the head building contract for the project and on 7 June 2012 the Minister for Sport and Recreation Terry Waldron MLA announced that hard work by the project team, led by the Department of Sport and Recreation, and a keen price by builders would enable the south stand to become a permanent, unroofed structure rather than new scaffold. It was completed in September 2013, with a capacity of 20,441.

In 2023, playing in the Toyota Challenge, the Western Force hosted the Cheetahs at Rushton Park, Mandurah and Claremont Oval in the south-western Perth suburb of Claremont.

In 2025 the Western Force played in front of their biggest crowd when they hosted the British & Irish Lions at Perth Stadium on their 2025 British & Irish Lions tour of Australia. Losing the match 7–54, the stadium had an attendance of 46,656, eclipsing their previous high of 37,037 set in their first ever professional match against the Brumbies in 2006.

Claremont (Perth)	Perth City	Burswood (Perth)	Mandurah
Claremont Oval	Perth Rectangular Stadium	Perth Stadium	Rushton Park
Capacity: 5,000	Capacity: 20,500	Capacity: 61,266	Capacity: 9,000

== Development teams ==
RugbyWA's two elite development squads just below full-time professional level are the Western Force A and WA Under 19 teams. These teams are closely aligned with the Western Force and train at McGillvray Oval, the training base used by the Force. RugbyWA also previously fielded a separate National Rugby Championship team, the Perth Spirit, until the end of season 2017 but competed in this tournament as the Western Force from 2018. From 2019 the Development Team, Perth Gold, competes in Emerging State Championship.

=== Western Force A ===
The Western Force A team plays matches against interstate and international representative teams, and has also competed in tournaments such as the Pacific Rugby Cup. Teams known by various names over the years including Western Force A, Western Force Gold and Force Academy have been selected from the best emerging rugby talent in Western Australia. The current squad is a mix of Western Force contracted players, Force Academy players from elite youth programs, and selected Premier Grade club rugby players.

In 2006 the Western Force Gold, playing in the traditional gold and black colours of Western Australia, undertook a two-week tour to South Africa. The team played the Golden Lions and Blue Bulls before returning home to Perth to play Manu Samoa and Japanese Top League teams Toshiba and Yamaha. In 2008, the Force Academy beat the Singapore national side by 113–7.

- 2019 Emerging States Championship Champions

=== Under 19 ===
The Western Force under 19 side plays in the URC competition. Western Australian teams played in the Southern States Tournament up until 2015 and also played occasional matches against other representative sides such as Pacific Rugby Cup teams. Prior to 2008, state colts teams at under 21 and under 19 age levels were fielded in national tournament but these teams were consolidated as under 20s ahead of the inaugural World Rugby U20 Championship. In 2018, an under 19 age limit was reinstated for the state colts teams.

== Season positions ==
=== Super Rugby ===
Year	Pos	Pld	W	D	L	PF	PA	+/−	BP	Pts
2006	14th	13	1	2	10	223	373	−150	4	12
2007	7th	13	6	1	6	276	282	−6	6	32
2008	8th	13	7	0	6	247	278	−31	5	33
2009	8th	13	6	1	6	328	275	+53	10	36
2010	13th	13	4	0	9	258	364	−106	3	19
2011	12th	16	5	2	9	333	416	−83	5	37
2012	14th	16	3	0	13	306	440	−134	7	27
2013	13th	16	4	1	11	267	366	−99	5	31
2014	8th	16	9	0	7	343	393	−50	4	40
2015	15th	16	3	0	13	245	384	−139	7	19
2016	16th	15	2	0	13	260	441	−181	5	13
2017	12th	15	6	0	9	313	404	−91	2	26
2020 AU	5th	8	0	0	8	115	253	−138	3	3
2021 AU	3rd	8	4	0	4	148	193	−45	2	18
2021 T-T	8th	5	0	0	5	82	148	−66	1	1
2022 Pacific	9th	14	4	0	10	326	443	−117	7	23
2023 Pacific	10th	14	5	0	9	346	494	-148	2	22
2024 Pacific	10th	14	4	0	10	294	426	-132	4	20
2025 Pacific	9th	14	4	1	9	358	472	-114	5	23

=== National Rugby Championship ===
Year	Pos	Pld	W	D	L	PF	PA	+/−	BP	Pts	Play-offs
2018	3rd	7	5	0	2	284	202	+82	3	23	Semifinalist
2019	1st	7	6	0	1	285	213	+72	4	28	Champion

=== Global Rapid Rugby ===
Year	Pos	Pld	W	D	L	PF	PA	+/−	BP	Pts	Play-offs
2019 ^{*}	1st	10	10	0	0	415	159	+256	11	43	—N/a

Notes:

^* Summary of all matches in the 2019 Global Rapid Rugby season, including the Asia and Pacific showcases.

== Honours ==
- Super Rugby AUS
  - Champions: 2026
  - Runner Up: 2025
- National Rugby Championship
  - Champions: 2019
  - Playoff appearances: 2018
- Global Rapid Rugby
  - Champions: 2019^{a}
- World Club 10s
  - Champions: 2016

=== Minor honours ===
- Toyota Challenge: winners 2 times runner up 3 times

Notes:

^^{a} Western Force won both the Asia and Pacific showcases in an undefeated 2019 Global Rapid Rugby season.

== Current squad ==
The squad for the 2027 Super Rugby Pacific season is:

2027 Western Force squad
**Props**: (Tonga) Misinale Epenisa; (Australia) Sef Fa'agase; (New Zealand) Reuben O'Neill; (Australia) Marley Pearce; (Australia) **Tom Robertson**; (New Zealand) Joshua Smith; (Australia) Bradley Kuhn ^{DEV}; (Australia) Max Sawers ^{DEV}; **Hookers**: (England) **Nic Dolly**; (Argentina) **Leonel Oviedo**; (Australia) **Brandon Paenga-Amosa**; (Australia) Albert Alcock ^{DEV}; **Locks**: (Australia) Lopeti Faifua; (Australia) **Jeremy Williams**; (Australia) Gus Farnan ^{DEV}; (Australia) Kenny Harris ^{DEV}; (Australia) Zak Healey ^{DEV}	**Loose forwards**: (Fiji) Netani Baleisomosomo; (Australia) **Nick Champion de Crespigny**; (Ireland) Jack Daly; (Australia) Aden Ekanayake; (Australia) Will Harris; (Australia) **Carlo Tizzano**; **Scrum-halves**: (Australia) Luke Aiken; (Australia) Nathan Hastie; (Argentina) **Agustín Moyano**; (Australia) Henry Robertson; (Australia) Harrison Goddard ^{DEV}; **Fly-halves**: (Australia) **Ben Donaldson**; (New Zealand) Alex Harford *; (Australia) **Harry McLaughlin-Phillips**; (Australia) **James O'Connor**	**Centres**: (Australia) Taj Annan; (Australia) Boston Fakafanua; (New Zealand) Divad Palu *; (Australia) **Hamish Stewart**; (Australia) **Kurtley Beale** ^{DEV}; **Outside backs**: (Australia) Wallace Charlie; (Australia) Mac Grealy; (Australia) Zac Lomax; (Australia) **Dylan Pietsch**; (Australia) James Ramm; (New Zealand) Tama Anderson ^{DEV}; (Australia) Ronan Leahy ^{DEV}
**Bold** denotes internationally capped players. * denotes players qualified to play for Australia on residency or dual nationality.^{DEV} denotes a development squad member. Source:

=== Super Rugby AUS ===
The squad for the 2026 Super Rugby AUS competition is:

2026 Western Force Super Rugby AUS squad
**Props**: (Australia) Jasper Asi; (Tonga) Misinale Epenisa; (Australia) Bradley Kuhn; (Australia) Anthony Passi; (Australia) Regin Pratt; (Australia) **Tom Robertson**; (Australia) Max Sawers; **Hookers**: (Australia) Albert Alcock; (England) **Nic Dolly** **(c)**; (American Samoa) Sam Faoagali; **Locks**: (Australia) Nate Gallagher; (Australia) Zak Healey (Note: Healey wasn't named in the original Super Rugby AUS squad, but was announced in the side for Round 1.); (Australia) Trevor Hosea; (Australia) Wil Taylor (Note: Taylor wasn't named in the original Super Rugby AUS squad, but was announced in the side for Round 1.)	**Loose forwards**: (New Zealand) Seta Baker (Note: Baker wasn't named in the original Super Rugby AUS squad, but was announced in the side for Round 1.); (Australia) **Nick Champion de Crespigny**; (Ireland) Jack Daly; (Australia) Aden Ekanayake (Note: Ekanayake wasn't named in the original Super Rugby AUS squad, but was announced in the side for Round 3.); (Australia) Will Harris; (Australia) Jackson Iose; (Australia) Kane Koteka; (New Zealand) Tim Sail; **Scrum-halves**: (Australia) Luke Aiken; (New Zealand) Nathan Hastie *; (Australia) Tamarangi Tunui; **Fly-halves**: (Australia) **Harry McLaughlin-Phillips**; (Australia) **James O'Connor** (Note: O'Connor wasn't named in the original Super Rugby AUS squad, but was announced in the side for Round 2.)	**Centres**: (Australia) **Kurtley Beale**; (Australia) Boston Fakafanua; (Australia) Evan Hooper (Note: Hooper wasn't named in the original Super Rugby AUS squad, but was announced in the side for Round 3.); **Outside backs**: (New Zealand) Tama Anderson (Note: Anderson wasn't named in the original Super Rugby AUS squad, but was announced in the side for Round 1.); (Australia) Wallace Charlie; (Australia) Mac Grealy; (Australia) Ronan Leahy; (Australia) Zac Lomax; (Australia) **Dylan Pietsch** (Note: Pietsch wasn't named in the original Super Rugby AUS squad, but was announced in the side for Round 3.)
**(c)** denotes the team captain. **Bold** denotes internationally capped players. * denotes players qualified to play for Australia on residency or dual nationality. Source:

== Coaches ==
Western Force Coaches
Coach	Tenure	Games	Wins	Losses	Draws	Win %	Finals Appearances	Titles
John Mitchell	2006–2010	65	24	37	4	37%	None	None
Richard Graham	2011–2012	24	7	15	2	29%	None	None
Phil Blake (interim)	2012	8	1	7	0	12%	None	None
Michael Foley	2012–2016	60	18	41	1	30%	None	None
David Wessels	2016–2017	18	6	12	0	33%	None	None
Tim Sampson*	2018–2022	63	32	31	0	51%	NRC: 2018, 2019 GRR: 2019 SR: 2021 AU	NRC: 2019 GRR: 2019
Simon Cron^	2022–present	32	10	22	0	31%	None	None

Updated 2 June 2024. * denotes combined record across Global Rapid Rugby, National Rugby Championship and all Super Rugby competitions. ^ denotes combined record across Super Rugby and all post-season capped tour games.

== Statistics ==
=== Competition ===
==== Super Rugby ====
Competition	Years	Matches					PF	PA
Competition	Years	P	W	D	L	W%	PF	PA
Super 14	2006–2010	65	24	4	37	36.92%	833	1,572
Super Rugby	2011–2017; 2020–present	145	40	3	102	27.59%	2,456	3,881
Overall	2006–2017; 2020–present	210	64	7	139	30.48%	3,289	5,453

==== National Rugby Championship ====
Competition	Years	Matches					PF	PA
Competition	Years	P	W	D	L	W%	PF	PA
National Rugby Championship	2018–2019	14	11	0	3	78.57%	569	415
Overall	2018–2019	14	11	0	3	78.57%	569	415

=== Individual records ===
==== Most appearances ====
#	Player	Caps	Span
1.	Matt Hodgson	140	2006–2017
2.	Pek Cowan	136	2006–2020
3.	Ian Prior	95	2014–2024
4.	Nathan Sharpe	92	2006–2012
4.	Ben McCalman	92	2010–2017

==== Most points ====
#	Player	Pts	Span
1.	Cameron Shepherd	372	2006–2012
2.	James O'Connor	306	2008–2011
3.	Matt Giteau	293	2007–2009
4.	Ian Prior	215	2014–2024
5.	Sias Ebersohn	212	2013–2015

==== Most tries ====
#	Player	Tries	Span
1.	Cameron Shepherd	30	2006–2012
2.	Matt Hodgson	20	2006–2017
3.	Carlo Tizzano	19	2023–2025
4.	Scott Staniforth	18	2006–2010
5.	Nick Cummins	16	2008–2015
5.	Ryan Cross	16	2007–2010

==== Most points in a season ====
#	Player	Pts	Year
1.	James O'Connor	170	2011
2.	Matt Giteau	128	2009
3.	Cameron Shepherd	121	2006
4.	Sias Ebersohn	117	2014
5.	Cameron Shepherd	115	2007

==== Most tries in a season ====
Tries	Player	Year
13	Carlo Tizzano	2025
9	Scott Staniforth	2006
8	Zach Kibirige	2023
7	Cameron Shepherd	2006
7	Cameron Shepherd	2007
7	Cameron Shepherd	2009
7	Nick Cummins	2014
6	Chase Tiatia	2024
6	Bayley Kuenzle	2024
6	Carlo Tizzano	2024
6	Matt Hodgson	2014

==== Most points in a match ====
#	Player	Pts	Opposition	Year
1.	Cameron Shepherd	25	Bulls	2007
2.	Cameron Shepherd	23	Reds	2007
2.	David Hill	23	Lions	2010
2.	Ben Donaldson	23	Drua	2024
3.	Matt Giteau	21	Chiefs	2007
4.	Matt Giteau	20	Lions	2009
4.	James O'Connor	20	Reds	2011
4.	David Harvey	20	Reds	2012
4.	Ben Donaldson	20	Moana Pasifika	2025

==== Most tries in a match ====
Tries	Player	Opposition	Year
3	Scott Staniforth	Lions	2006
3	Cameron Shepherd	Brumbies	2009
3	Nick Cummins	Waratahs	2014
3	Marcel Brache	Sunwolves	2016
3	Jordan Olowofela	Queensland Reds	2021
3	Nic Dolly	Fijian Drua	2025

=== Firsts ===
- First pre-season game – vs the Cheetahs (lost 19–29)
- First season game – Round 1, 2006 vs Brumbies (lost 10–25)
- First try – Scott Fava vs Brumbies
- First points – Scott Daruda (3-point penalty kick) vs Brumbies
- First conversion – Scott Daruda vs Brumbies
- First draw – Round 11, 2006 vs Crusaders (23–23)
- First drop goal – Matt Giteau vs Cheetahs
- First penalty try – Pre-Season 2006 vs Cheetahs (19–29)
- First win – Round 13, 2006 vs Cheetahs (16–14)
- First home win – Round 6, 2007 vs the Hurricanes (18–17)

== Controversies ==
In November 2007, Western Force players Scott Fava and Richard Brown were fined and ordered to do community service for mistreating protected native quokkas at a team bonding session on Rottnest Island, 19 kilometres (12 mi) off the coast of Perth. Eye-witness accounts stated that the players had mishandled the animals, including trapping and throwing them, though none were known to be seriously injured. Alcohol was said to be a factor. As a result of the actions, Australian Wallaby number 8 Fava was ordered to pay $11,000, attend a week of community service and undergo counselling for alcohol abuse, while flanker Richard Brown was sentenced to a $5,000 fine as well as seven days' community service. Both fines were payable to the Rottnest Island Conservation Foundation.

In February 2008, Matt Henjak and Haig Sare were involved in a fight at a pub in Perth. Henjak hit Sare and broke his jaw and was sacked by the Force for misconduct. Haig Sare returned to play for the Force at the end of Season 2008 once his injuries healed.

=== Firepower funding debacle ===
Sponsorship payments from the fuel technology company Firepower were a major factor in luring Wallaby star Matt Giteau and others to play for the Western Force in Perth. The luckless Giteau was one of a number of sportsmen owed millions of dollars after the collapse of Firepower. A new consortium offered to cover the Firepower money if Giteau extended his existing contract; he, however, chose not to and returned to Canberra to play for the Brumbies.

== See also ==
- List of Western Force players
- Rugby union in Western Australia
