= Rugby union in Singapore =

Rugby in Singapore

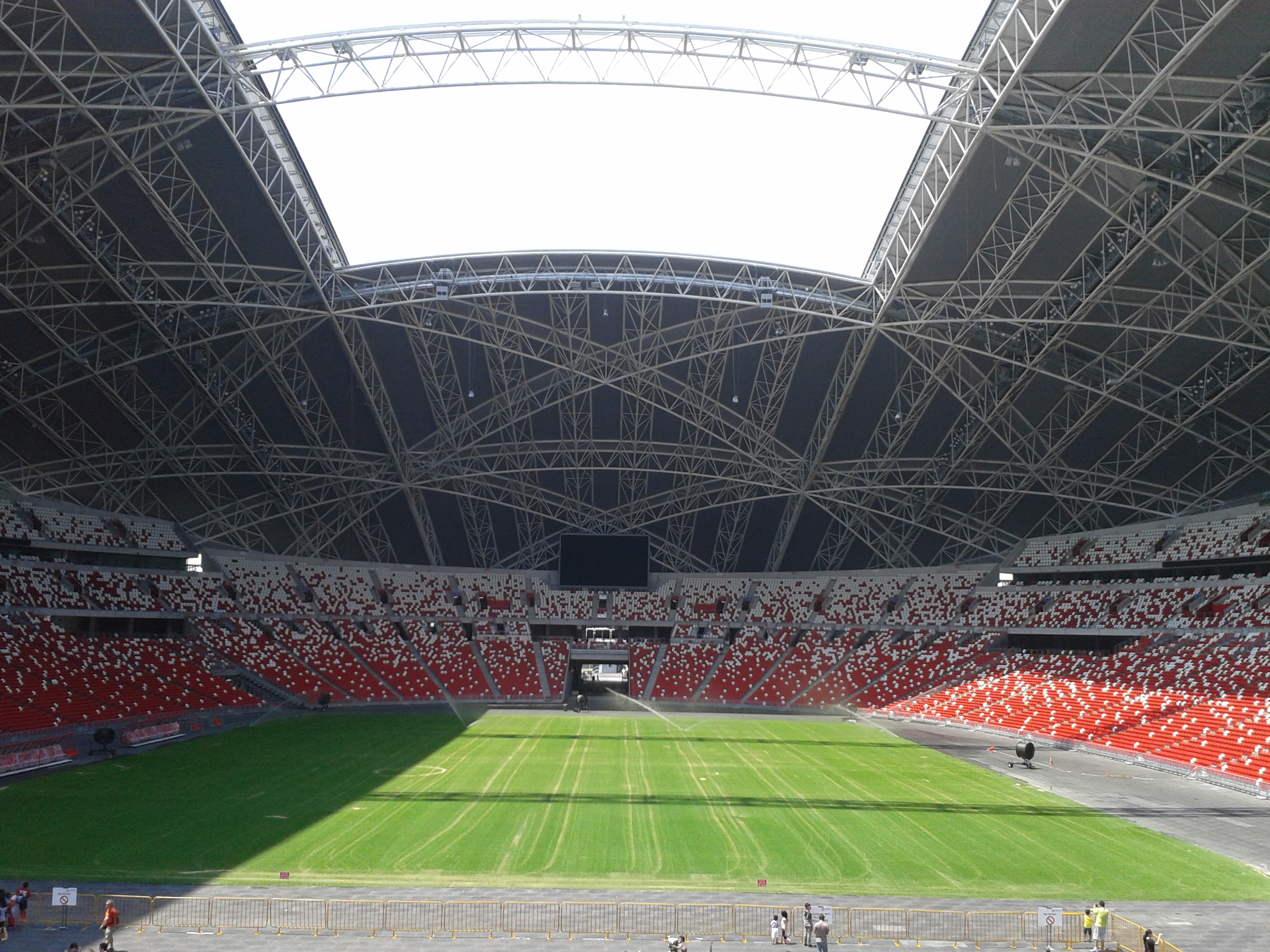
- National Stadium, Singapore (capacity 55,000)
- Country: Singapore
- Governing body: Singapore Rugby Union
- National team: Singapore
- Nickname: The Jaguars
- First played: Late 19th century
- Registered players: 9,400
- Clubs: 13

International competitions
- Asia Rugby Championship; Asian Sevens Series; Asian Games Sevens; Qualification tournaments: Rugby World Cup qualifiers; Rugby World Cup Sevens qualifiers; Sevens World Series qualifiers

Rugby union is not a major sport in Singapore. As of July 2026, the Singaporean men's team was ranked 64th in the world and 9th in Asia. As of February 2015, there were over 12,000 registered players, with more than 2,000 women playing the sport. There are also 15 formally organised clubs with 4 registered Women's sides.

Club Rugby in Singapore is played in three divisions – the Premiership, the Championship, and the Conference. School Rugby is also contested over three age groups – the C division (under 14), the B division (under 17) and the A division (under 19). There are also a few schools that have a primary school-level rugby programme where they contest in the under-12 competition.

== Governing body ==
The governing body of rugby union in Singapore is the Singapore Rugby Union (SRU), which was founded in 1966. It joined the International Rugby Football Board (now World Rugby) in 1988.

== History ==
The game is popular among expatriate workers from Commonwealth countries, such as the United Kingdom, Australia and New Zealand – and there are at least twenty such rugby clubs founded on this basis. While there has been some take up amongst other groups, and a long-standing effort to involve Singaporeans, including by Australians Peter Randall and Andrew Blades in the mid 1990s, progress in growing the game has only been gradual.

=== Early history ===
Rugby union was introduced to the British colony of Singapore in the late 19th century. It has had a steady presence since the beginning of the 20th century, when the Malaya Cup between Singapore Civilians team and states of Malaya was then established, which is one of the oldest rugby competitions in the world.

However, unlike the other colonial city state of Asia, Hong Kong, rugby has not been quite so successful in Singapore. The tragic events of the Second World War and the Japanese occupation of Singapore also disrupted its growth. Between 1945 and 1991, a regiment of New Zealanders was based in Singapore, and during those years they dominated the game to the extent that when they left, the Singaporean rugby scene almost fell apart.

=== Local rugby: 1970s & 1980s ===
1971 saw the launch of an all national U23 team made up of locals from the police force, armed forces, schools and local clubs when it played a curtain raiser game against a Malaysia U23 (which they won), to the main touring England vs Singapore Select game.

3 Locals were selected in the Singapore Select Squad to play England at Jalan Besar Stadium on 3 October 1971. Leow Kim Liat of Police Military was to captain the side, but was injured prior and was unable to play. The final score was 39–9.

The true local Singapore rugby story began in 1972 when the national team under the presidency of ASP Niaz Mohd Shah who led the charge to send a team made up of only of Singapore citizens to partake in the 3rd Asian Rugby Football Tournament in Hong Kong. The team was led by Leow Kim Liat and performed credibly with a 4th placing result.

In 1975, the Singapore National team took part in the SEAP Games in Bangkok and emerged 3rd winning a bronze medal. In 1977, under the presidency of renowned lawyer, Mr Howard Cashin, Singapore, as an all citizens national team, took part in the SEA Games held at Kuala Lumpur and emerged runner up with a silver medal.

The national team's best season was in 1978 when they beat the Singapore-based 1st RNZIR battalion team in the semi-finals of the MRU Cup competition played in Kuala Lumpur, and then went on to win the grand final. Later in the same year, also in Kuala Lumpur at the 6th Asian Rugby Football Tournament, the Singapore all-Asian nationals team emerged third in Asia against all odds, after Japan and Korea. They defeated Malaysia, Hong Kong and Thailand in the run up to the third placing.

For the stellar performance in 1978, the Singapore National Olympic Council awarded national sports accolades to Singapore rugby. The Singapore all-nationals team won the 1978 Team of the Year award, the Coach of the Year went to rugby coach, Natahar Bava and Sportsman of the Year went to the pack leader, Song Koon Poh. This was a "Grand Slam" achievement by the game of rugby in the history of sport in Singapore.

The MRU Cup victory feat was repeated again in 1982, and again the team was coached by Natahar Bava. Likewise, the 7s game also flourished in Singapore from 1977 to 1982. The Singapore all-nationals team played in the ever popular Hong Kong 7s in 1978, emerging as Plate finalists. In 1979, the team qualified for the cup quarter finals for first time ever but eventually lost out to Western Samoa. In 1980 Singapore again qualified for the plate finals. In spite of all the adversities encountered, these achievements by local rugby and the SRU then were momentous indeed and showed that local rugby did flourish in the late 1970s and 1980s.

=== 1990s to 2009 ===
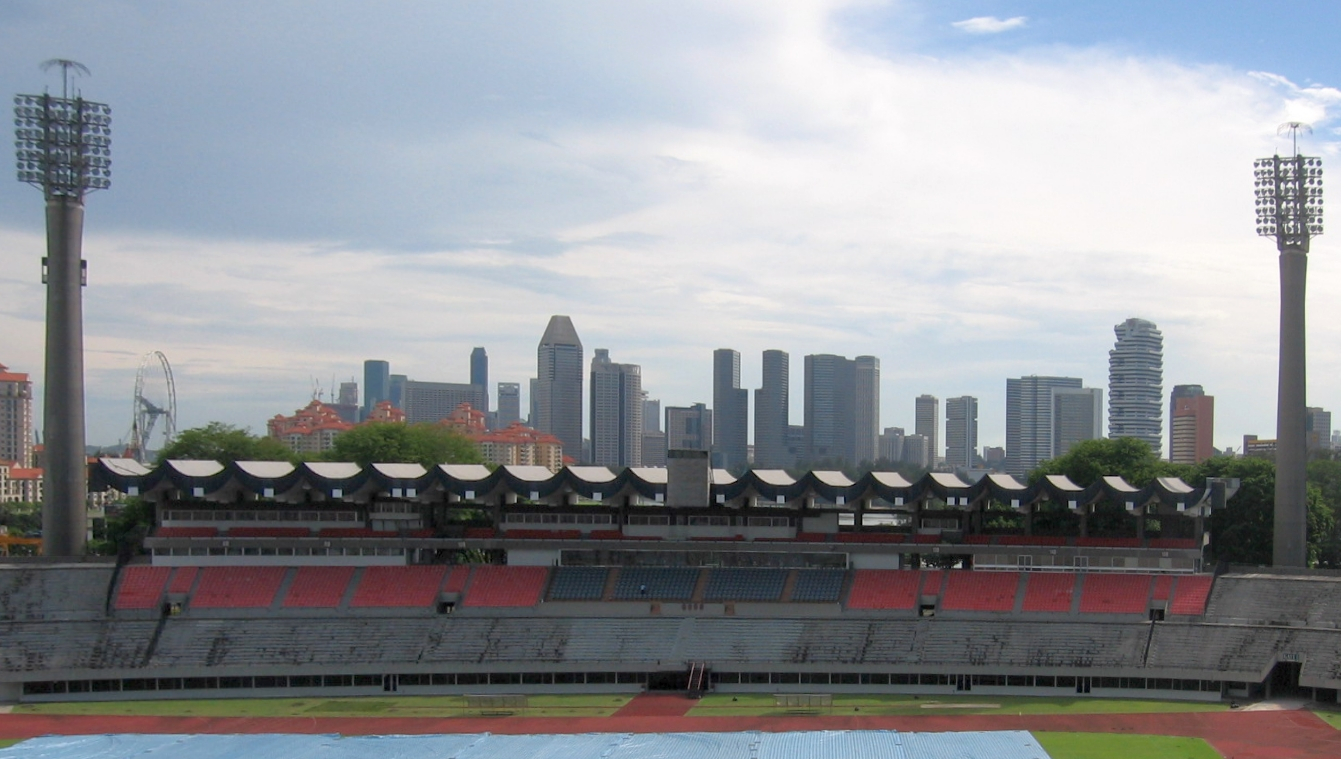
The Former National Stadium which closed in 2007 hosted many of Singapore's rugby internationals.

Singapore rugby did not maintain the same levels of achievement into the 1990s. After a heavy defeat at the hands of Hong Kong in 1995, the SRU decided to appoint a full-time officer and four part-time development officers, and instituted a schools programme. Between 1995 and 1998, over a hundred schools took up the sport.

Singapore competed in the Asian Rugby Championship divisional tournaments starting in 1998, playing in a round-robin with Malaysia, Sri Lanka, and Indonesia. The Singapore's sevens team began playing in the Commonwealth Sevens with the inaugural tournament being held in Kuala Lumpur in 1998, and the team continued to compete in the Hong Kong Sevens tournament.

The Singapore Sevens tournament was set up as a standby for the Hong Kong Sevens, should it have declined under Chinese rule. It formed part of the IRB World Sevens Series in 2002, and from 2004 to 2006 before being replaced on the tour by the 2007 Adelaide Sevens.

=== 2010 onwards ===
The SRU hosted the inaugural World Club 10s rugby tournament in 2014 at the new National Stadium, with eight international club teams competing. The Auckland Blues, captained by Piri Weepu, defeated the ACT Brumbies after double extra time by 10–5 to win the first title.

The Singapore Sevens tournament returned as an official event within the Asian Sevens Series in 2013, before a four-year deal was secured to host a leg of the Sevens World Series in Singapore again starting from the 2015–16 season.

When Japan's Sunwolves team gained admission to the Super Rugby competition for the 2016 season, they agreed to host some of their home matches in Singapore at the National Stadium.

== National teams ==
=== Men ===
- Singapore national rugby union team – competes in the divisional tournaments of the Asia Rugby Championship
- Singapore national rugby sevens team – competes in the Asian Sevens Series and Commonwealth Sevens

=== Women ===
- Singapore women's national rugby union team – first played in 2006, competes in the Asia Rugby Women's Championship
- Singapore women's national rugby union team (sevens) – competes in the Asian Women's Sevens Championship

== Competitions ==
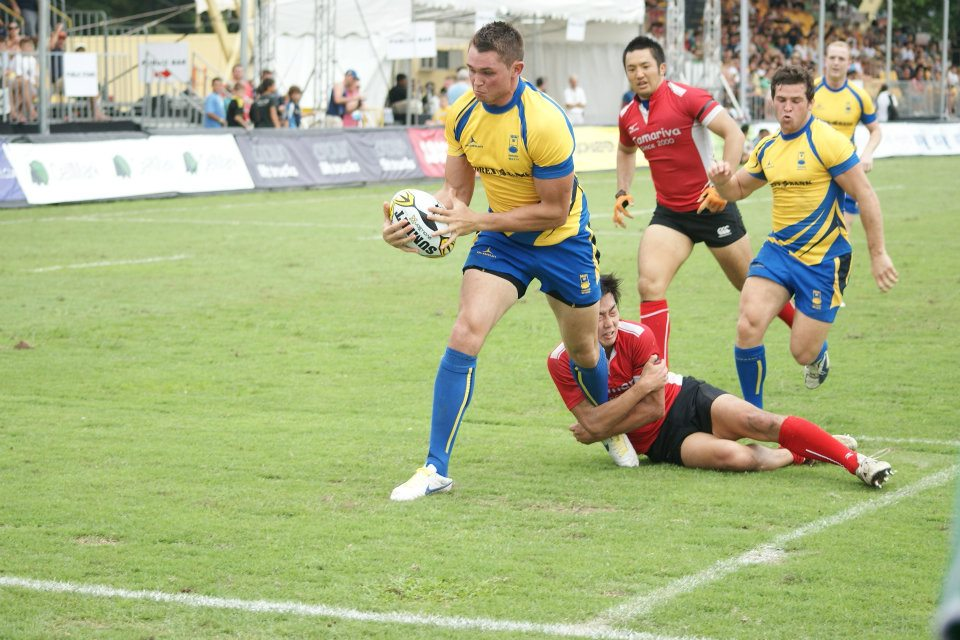
Sweden's Andrew Daish scoring a try at the Singapore Sevens in 2011

=== International events hosted ===
- Singapore Sevens – inaugurated in 2002 and currently part of the Sevens World Series as of 2016.
- Singapore Cricket Club International Rugby Sevens – played since 1948

=== Domestic Rugby ===
Senior men's competitions:

- Premiership
- Championship
- Conference

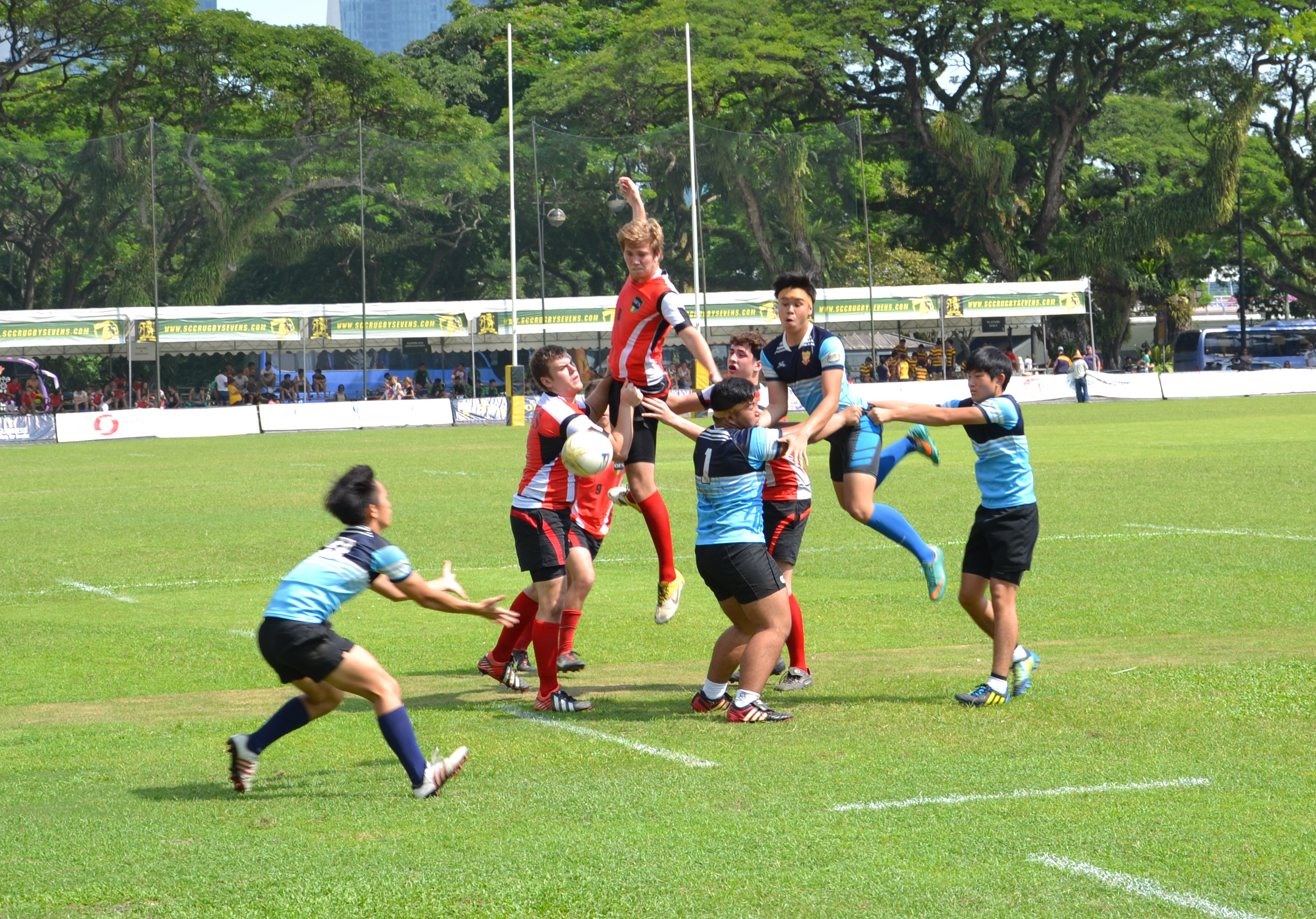
A schoolboy rugby match at the Padang in Singapore in October 2013

=== Schools Rugby ===
Junior men's competitions are played by schools over three age groups:

- A division (under 19)
- B division (under 17)
- C division (under 14)

== 2019 Rugby World Cup bid ==
Singapore and Hong Kong were proposed as co-hosts in Japan's bid for the 2019 Rugby World Cup, but ultimately Japan was selected to host the tournament alone.

== Singapore rugby referees ==
Singapore rugby referees have performed notably on the international stage, despite the small rugby playing population. They have been appointed to referee at international events like the Hong Kong Sevens, Asian Games, and the Commonwealth Games, as well as at top Asian test matches such as Hong Kong vs Japan.

== Notable Singaporean players ==
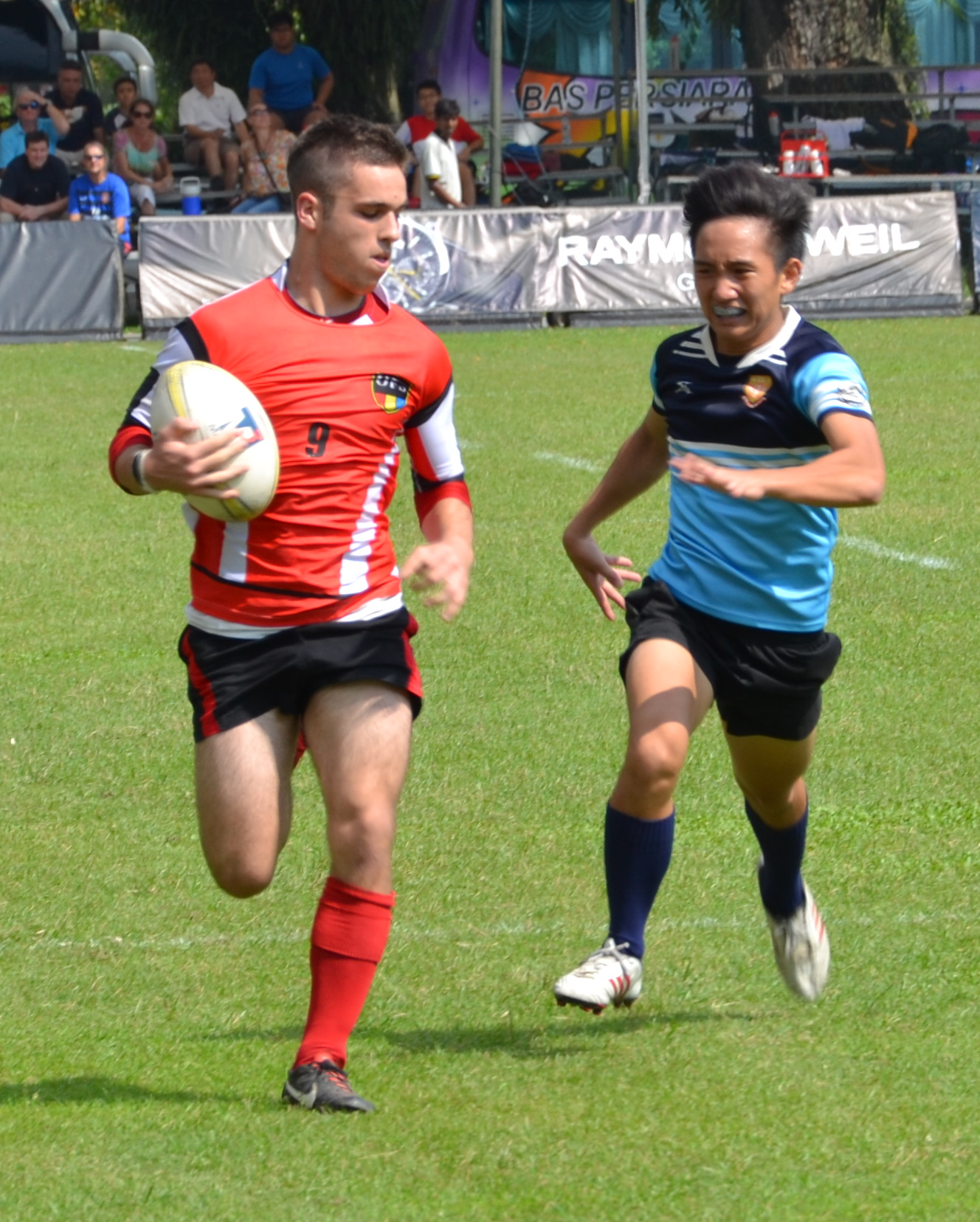
Players running down the touchline during the Singapore Cricket Club Rugby Sevens tournament

- How Wai Chew (Singapore 1971–1975) Only local Asian to have played on the wing vs England in 1971.
- Leow Kim Liat (Singapore 1970–1974, Captain 1972–1974) Captain of Singapore's first all-local citizens national team in 1972.
- Natahar Bava (Singapore 1971–1973); Singapore's Athletics Asian Games 400m medalist; most successful national rugby coach ever – coach of MRU Cup winning sides twice in 1978 & 1982 as well as Asian third place in 1978. Honoured as Singapore's Coach of the year 1978 by Singapore National Olympic Council.
- Song Koon Poh (Singapore U-23 1971; Singapore 1972–1991) Captain 1976–77, 1979–81 & 1984–87. Singapore's Sportsman of the Year 1978 (The only team player ever to have won the national Sportsman of the year award in 1978 till current time); toured South Africa with Tokkie's Dragons in 1982 (only Asian picked to tour S Africa in an invitational "rest of the world" team). Played in Singapore NZ Commanders XV vs Canterbury of NZ in 1984. One of two locals selected for Singapore Select XV v France in 1984.
- Jarmal Singh (Singapore 1974–1980, captain 1975 & 1978) Most successful Singapore captain ever in 1978.
- Andrew Chin (Singapore 1977–1988, Captain 1982) Only Singapore player to have played in the Hong Kong 7s nine times.
- Rong Jing Xiang, (Singapore 1996–2009) Captain 2004–2009, youngest player ever capped by Singapore at 16.
- Jon Lee, (Singapore 2009–present) Captain 2010–2012.
- Jay-Hykel Jln (Singapore 2013–present) First Singaporean to be selected to play for Asian Pacific Dragons in 2014 Hong Kong 10s coached by former All Black Tana Umaga.
- Reiner Leong (Singapore 2013–2018) First Singaporean to play at the new Singapore National Stadium in 2014 for the Asian Pacific Dragons at the first ever World Club 10s.

== See also ==
- Singapore national rugby union team
- Singapore national rugby sevens team
- Singapore Sevens
