= Tama Anderson =

New Zealand rugby union player

- Born: 14 October 2003 (age 23) Whangārei, New Zealand
- Height: 178 cm (5 ft 10 in)
- Weight: 88 kg (194 lb; 13 st 12 lb)
- School: Mount Albert Grammar School

Rugby union career
- Position: Wing / Fullback
- Current team: Force
Senior career
Years	Team	Apps	(Points)
2022–2024	Northland	4	(10)
2027–	Force	0	(0)
- Correct as of 1 November 2026

Tama Anderson (born 14 October 2003) is a New Zealand rugby union player, who plays for the Force. His preferred position is wing or fullback.

== Early career ==
Anderson was born in Whangārei and attended Mount Albert Grammar School, earning selection for the Blues U18s in 2021. Having returned to Northland after leaving school, and joining up with the Northland academy, he was named in the Blues U20 squad in 2023. He moved to Australia in 2025, joining the Nedlands club in Western Australia.

== Professional career ==
Anderson represented Northland in the 2022, 2023 and 2024 Bunnings NPC competitions. Anderson was called into the Force squad for the 2026 Super Rugby AUS competition, making two appearances. He was then named in the Force squad for the 2027 Super Rugby Pacific season, being named in the full train and trial squad.
