= Wallace Charlie =

Australian rugby union player

- Born: 6 August 2006 (age 20) Erub Island, Australia
- Height: 181 cm (5 ft 11 in)
- School: Ipswich Grammar School

Rugby union career
- Position: Wing / Fullback
- Current team: Force
Senior career
Years	Team	Apps	(Points)
2027–	Force	0	(0)
- Correct as of 1 November 2026
International career
Years	Team	Apps	(Points)
2026	Australia U20	5	(5)
- Correct as of 1 November 2026
National sevens team
Years	Team		Comps
2025–2026	Australia		10
- Correct as of 1 November 2026

Wallace Charlie (born 6 August 2006) is an Australian rugby union player, who plays for the Force. His preferred position is wing or fullback.

== Early career ==
Charlie is from Erub Island in the Torres Strait. His rugby career began when he was offered a scholarship to attended Ipswich Grammar School, playing rugby for their first XV. He represented Australia U20 in 2026.

== Professional career ==
Having impressed at the Global Youth Sevens in 2025, Charlie was called into the Australia Sevens squad for the 2025 USA Sevens. He joined the squad full time for the following season, competing in all nine rounds of the competition. In October 2025, he signed for the Force. He was named in the Force squad for the 2026 Super Rugby AUS competition, before, in October 2026, being named in the main Force squad for the 2027 Super Rugby Pacific season.
