= Aden Ekanayake =

Australian rugby player (born 2005)

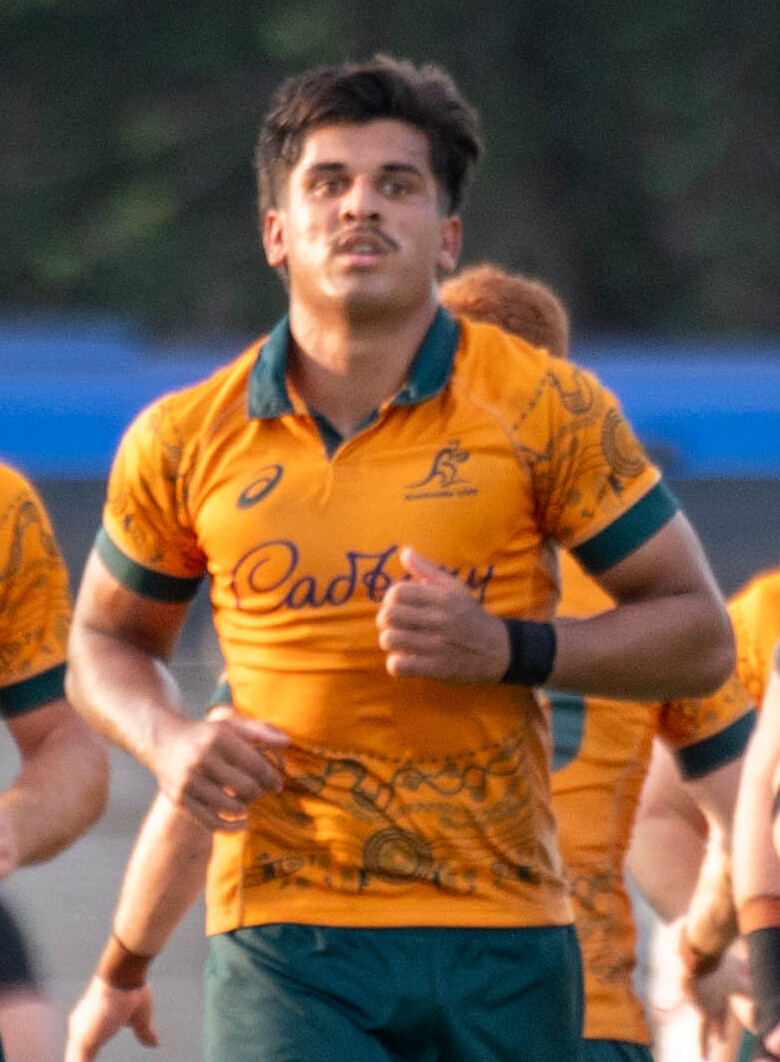
- Ekanayake with Australia U20s at the 2025 U20 Rugby Championship
- Born: 18 March 2005 (age 21) Sydney, New South Wales, Australia
- Height: 191 cm (6 ft 3 in)
- Weight: 98 kg (216 lb)
- School: Barker College

Rugby union career
- Position: Flanker
- Current team: Force
Youth career
- 2011–2021: Killara-West Pymble
- 2023–2025: Waratahs Academy
Amateur team(s)
Years	Team	Apps	(Points)
2023–2026	Gordon		
Senior career
Years	Team	Apps	(Points)
2027–	Force	0	(0)
International career
Years	Team	Apps	(Points)
2024–2025	Australia U20	11	(15)
- Correct as of 17 June 2026
National sevens team
Years	Team		Comps
2024–2026	Australia		12

Aden Ekanayake (Sinhala: ඒඩන් ඒකනායක; born 18 March 2005) is an Australian rugby union player who currently plays for the Force in the Super Rugby. Between 2024 and 2026, Ekanayake played for the Australia national sevens team on the World Rugby Sevens Circuit.

== Early life and youth career ==
Ekanayake was born in Sydney, New South Wales, Australia in 2005. Ekanayake is of Sri Lankan descent through his father, whom was born in the country before moving to Australia. Ekanayake attended private school Barker College in Sydney's northern suburbs. By 2023, Ekanayake had joined the Waratahs Academy after impressing at trials earlier in the year. Ekanayake was also selected in an Australian under-18s squad late in the year.

== Career ==
=== Sevens ===
He played for Australia at the Global Youth Sevens (GYS) in 2022 and played club rugby for Gordon, the Sydney Junior team and the Australian Schools and under-18 national team in 2023. He appeared five times at the World Rugby U20 Championship in South Africa in 2024 as a flanker.

After travelling as a reserve for the 2023–24 SVNS series, he made his debut for the Australia national sevens team at the Dubai Sevens in 2024, and then also played at the South Africa Sevens in Cape Town, part of the 2024–25 SVNS series. He scored an injury time try to help gain victory for Australia against South Africa in the semi-finals of the 2025 Australia Sevens in Perth. In May 2025, he was nominated for Rookie of the Year for 2024–25. In June 2025, he was named in the Australia U20 squad for the World Rugby U20 Championships in Italy, and later continued with the Australia sevens team for the 2025–26 season.

=== Force ===
In June 2026, Ekanayake was announced as the latest signing for the Perth-based Western Force in the Super Rugby. Ekanayake signed a three-year deal with the side, beginning in the 2027 season.
