= Singapore Cricket Club International Rugby Sevens =

Rugby union competition

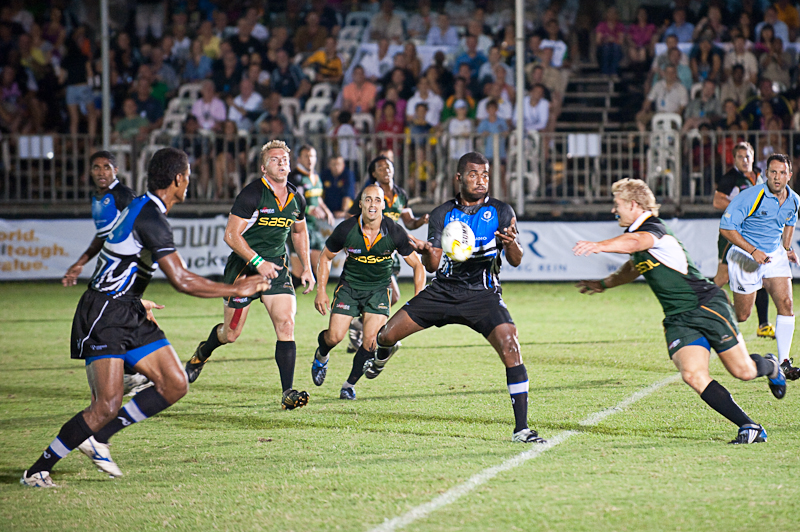
Fiji Davetalevu v South African Vipers at the 2009 SCC Rugby Sevens.

The Singapore Cricket Club International Rugby Sevens is an annual rugby sevens tournament hosted by the Singapore Cricket Club (SCC). The event is one of the premier international club tournaments in Asia, involving teams from around the world. The trophy for the tournament, the Ablitt Cup, is named after Mr Bernard E Ablitt who was Convenor of the SCC Rugby Section from 1931-2 and President of the club from 1938-9. The silver Ablitt Cup was donated by Mrs Katherine Parentis in 1947 for the winners of the first seven-a-side tournament organised by the SCC Rugby Section. The tournament has since become an annual competition and one of the world's oldest rugby sevens competitions.

== Past winners ==
- 2025 - Shogun Rugby
- 2024 - Daveta (FIJ)
- 2023 - Daveta (FIJ)
- 2022 - Ponsonby (NZ)
- 2021 - not contested
- 2020 - not contested
- 2019 - Daveta (FIJ)
- 2018 - Daveta (FIJ)
- 2017 - France Development 7s (FRA)
- 2016 - England Sevens Academy (ENG)
- 2015 - SARU Sevens Academy (RSA)
- 2014 - Borneo Eagles (MAL)
- 2013 - Asia Pacific Dragons (HKG)
- 2012 - Daveta (FIJ)
- 2011 - Daveta (formerly Davetalevu) (FIJ)
- 2010 - Penguin International RFC (UK)
- 2009 - SA Vipers (SA)
- 2008 - SA Vipers (SA)
- 2007 - SA Vipers (SA)
- 2006 - Ponsonby (NZ)
- 2005 - Davetalevu (FIJ)
- 2004 - British Army UK (UK)
- 2003 - Durban Harlequins (SA)
- 2002 - Davetalevu (FIJ)
- 2001 - Oriental Rongotai (NZ)
- 2000 - Taradale (NZ)
- 1999 - Taradale (NZ)
- 1998 - Petone (NZ)
- 1997 - Taradale (NZ)
- 1996 - N Z Diplomats (NZ)
- 1995 - Davetalevu (FIJ)
- 1994 - Davetalevu (FIJ)
- 1993 - Randwick (AUS)
- 1992 - Kaitake RFC (NZ)
- 1991 - Samoan Coconuts (SAM)
- 1990 - Kaitake RFC (NZ)
- 1989 - Ponsonby (NZ)
- 1988 - Ponsonby (NZ)
- 1987 - Royal Hong Kong Police (HKG)
- 1986 - RSL Dragons (AUS)
- 1985 - Lloyds (UK)
- 1984 - RNZIR - "A" Team (NZ)
- 1983 - Casuarina Cougars (AUS)
- 1982 - RNZIR - Chuckles - "C" Coy (NZ)
- 1981 -
- 1980 -
- 1979 - RNZIR - Bunnies/Red Bee - "B" Coy (NZ)
- 1978 - RNZIR - Chuckles - "C" Coy (NZ)
- 1977 - RNZIR - Bunnies/Red Bee - "B" Coy (NZ)
- 1976 - RNZIR - Chuckles - "C" Coy (NZ)
- 1975 - RNZIR - "A" Coy (NZ)
- 1974 - RNZIR Admin Support "A" (NZ)
- 1973 - RNZIR - Chuckles - "C" Coy (NZ)
- 1972 - SCC "C" (SG)
- 1971 - RAF Changi RUFC (NZ)
- 1970 - RAF Changi RUFC (NZ)
- 1969 - SCC "A" (SG)
- 1968 - RNZIR 95 CDO Lt RA (NZ)
- 1967 - HMNZS Blackpool "A" (NZ)
- 1966 - Seletar - RNZIR (NZ)
- 1965 - GHQ
- 1964 - GHQ
- 1963 - RNZIR - Changi "A" (NZ)
- 1962 - RAF Changi RUFC (NZ)
- 1961 - SCC "B" (SG)
- 1960 - RNZAF 75th Sqdn "A" (NZ)
- 1959 - Naval Base "A" (NZ)
- 1958 - SCC "B" (SG)
- 1957 - SCC "C" (SG)
- 1956 - SCC "A" (SG)
- 1955 - Fijians (FIJ)
- 1954 - South Johore (MAL)
- 1953 - SCC "B" (SG)
- 1952 - Fijians (FIJ)
- 1951 - RASC
- 1950 - RASC
- 1949 - SER
- 1948 - GHQ
