= World Club 10s =

- Sport: Rugby 10s
- First season: 2014
- No. of teams: 8
- Most recent champion: Blue Bulls (2018)
- Website: worldclub10s.com

World Club 10s is a rugby union tournament played under rugby tens rules, and contested by professional clubs from around the world. Top-level teams from Africa, Asia, Europe, and Oceania, have played in the tournament since the first edition in 2014.

== History ==
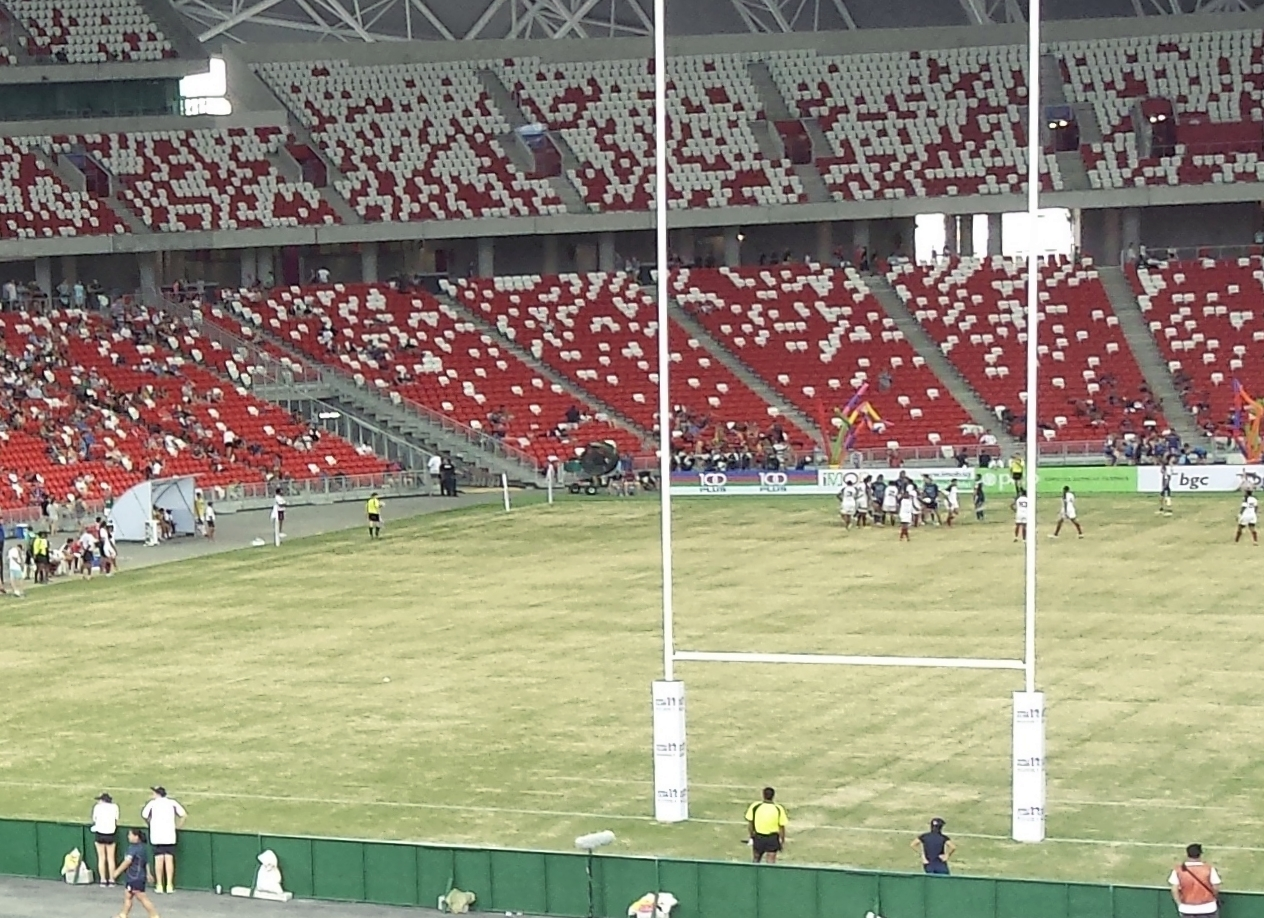
World Club 10s in Singapore, 2014.

The first tournament was played in Singapore as the opening event of the new National Stadium in June 2014. The Auckland Blues of New Zealand won the final by 10–5 after double extra time against Australia's ACT Brumbies. However, the event was overshadowed by a serious injury during the third-place playoff match that ended the rugby career of Welsh player Owen Williams.

After a hiatus in 2015, the tournament moved to Mauritius with Beachcomber as the new title sponsor for 2016. In an all-Australian final, the Western Force won the title by 7–0 to leave the ACT Brumbies as runner-up for a second time. The Blue Bulls from South Africa reached the final in 2017 and 2018, winning back-to-back titles against the Free State Cheetahs and Newcastle Falcons, respectively.

== Champions ==
Year	Venue	Cup final			Placings			Ref.
		Winner	Score	Runner-up	Third	Fourth	Fifth	
2014	National Stadium; Singapore	(New Zealand) Blues	10–5 a.e.t.	(Australia) Brumbies	(Hong Kong) AP Dragons	(Wales) Cardiff Blues	Samoa Water	
2016	Stade Anjalay; Mauritius	(Australia) Force	7–0	(Australia) Brumbies	(South Africa) Sharks	Italy All Stars	(Hong Kong) AP Dragons	
2017	Stade Anjalay; Mauritius	(South Africa) Blue Bulls	26–7	(South Africa) Cheetahs	(Hong Kong) AP Dragons	(Australia) Force	(France) Pyrenees	
2018	Stade Anjalay; Mauritius	(South Africa) Blue Bulls	24–17	(England) Newcastle	(South Africa) Sharks	(France) Montpellier	(Hong Kong) AP Dragons	
