= Ronan Leahy =

Australian rugby union player

- Born: 18 May 2004 (age 22) Port Moresby, Papua New Guinea
- Height: 188 cm (6 ft 2 in)
- Weight: 96 kg (212 lb; 15 st 2 lb)
- School: St Joseph's College, Hunters Hill

Rugby union career
- Position: Wing
- Current team: Force
Senior career
| Years | Team | Apps | (Points) |
| 2024– | Force | 2 | (0) |
- Correct as of 10 December 2024
International career
| Years | Team | Apps | (Points) |
| 2023–2024 | Australia U20 | 11 | (20) |
- Correct as of 10 December 2024

Ronan Leahy (born 18 May 2004) is an Australian rugby union player, who plays for the Force. His preferred position is wing.

== Early career ==
Born in Port Moresby, Papua New Guinea, he moved to Australia as a child, originally to Toowoomba before attending St Joseph's College, Hunters Hill in Sydney. He played club rugby for Sydney University, before moving to Western Australia to join the Force academy in 2022. He represented Australia U20 in both 2023 and 2024.

== Professional career ==
Leahy was called into the Force squad ahead of Round 14 of the 2024 Super Rugby Pacific season, making his debut in the same fixture against the Reds. He was named in the full Force squad ahead of the 2025 Super Rugby Pacific season in November 2024.
