= Misinale Epenisa =

Tongan rugby union player

- Full name: Misinale O Nafualu Uluaki Uakilu Epenisa
- Born: 11 October 2001 (age 25) Tonga
- Height: 195 cm (6 ft 5 in)
- Weight: 128 kg (282 lb; 20 st 2 lb)
- School: Feilding High School

Rugby union career
- Position: Prop
- Current team: Force, Manawatu
Senior career
| Years | Team | Apps | (Points) |
| 2024– | Manawatu | 10 | (0) |
| 2026– | Force | 12 | (10) |
- Correct as of 30 May 2026

Misinale Epenisa (born 11 October 2001) is a Tongan rugby union player, who plays for Force and Manawatu. His preferred position is prop.

== Early career ==
Epenisa was born in Tonga and played his club rugby on the island for Toloa Old Boys. He moved to New Zealand for schooling where he attended Feilding High School, and later play his rugby for College Old Boys. He previously represented Tonga at U20 level and for the Tonga A side.

== Professional career ==
Epenisa has represented Manawatu in the National Provincial Championship since 2024, being named in the squad for the 2025 Bunnings NPC. He signed for the Force ahead of the 2026 Super Rugby Pacific season.
