= Harry McLaughlin-Phillips =

Australian rugby union player

- Born: 13 April 2004 (age 22) Toowoomba, Queensland, Australia
- Height: 177 cm (5 ft 10 in) (Note: Also cited as 5 ft 8 in (1.73 m) and 89 kg (196 lb; 14 st 0 lb).)
- Weight: 87 kg (192 lb; 13 st 10 lb)
- School: Brisbane Boys' College

Rugby union career
- Position: Fly-half
- Current team: Force
Youth career
- Gunnedah Rugby Club
- 2023–2024: Reds Academy
Amateur team(s)
Years	Team	Apps	(Points)
- Souths
Senior career
Years	Team	Apps	(Points)
2023–2026	Reds	30	(87)
2027–	Force	0	(0)
- Correct as of 6 June 2026
International career
Years	Team	Apps	(Points)
2023–2024	Australia U20	11	(53)
2024–2025	Australia A	2	(2)
2025	ANZAC XV	1	(0)
2026–	Australia	1	(0)
- Correct as of 17 October 2026

Harry McLaughlin-Phillips (born 13 April 2004) is an Australian rugby union player, who plays for the Western Force in the Super Rugby. His preferred position is fly-half.

== Early career ==
Born in Toowoomba, the Darling Downs region of Queensland, McLaughlin-Phillips grew up in Gunnedah, New South Wales, before moving back to Queensland to the Sunshine Coast. He attended Brisbane Boys' College (BBC) located in Toowong. He plays his club rugby for Souths and represented the Junior Wallabies in 2023.

== Career ==
=== Reds ===
McLaughlin-Phillips was named in the Reds squad ahead of the 2024 Super Rugby Pacific season. He made his debut in Round 1 of the season against the Waratahs.

=== Force ===
McLaughlin-Phillips joined Queensland Reds rivals, Western Force, in June 2026 on a three-year deal ahead of the 2027 season. Capped with Australia A, McLaughlin-Phillips would be the second fly-half, behind Ben Donaldson, for the Force with international experience in 2027.
