= Toby Macpherson =

Australian rugby union player

- Born: 18 August 2004 (age 22) Dubbo, New South Wales, Australia
- Height: 199 cm (6 ft 6 in)
- Weight: 113 kg (249 lb; 17 st 11 lb)
- School: Brisbane Boys' College

Rugby union career
- Position(s): Lock, Flanker
- Current team: Brumbies
Senior career
Years	Team	Apps	(Points)
2025	Toyota Verblitz	2	(0)
2026 –	Brumbies	13	(10)
- Correct as of 5 June 2026
International career
Years	Team	Apps	(Points)
2023–2024	Australia U20	13	(15)
- Correct as of 8 November 2025

Toby Macpherson (born 18 August 2004) is an Australian rugby union player, who plays for the Brumbies. His preferred position is lock or flanker.

== Early career ==
Macpherson was born in Dubbo, New South Wales but moved to Queensland as a child settling in Goondiwindi. He attended Brisbane Boys' College before moving to Canberra to become a member of the Brumbies academy. He plays his club rugby for the Uni-Norths Owls. Macpherson represented Australia U20 in both 2023 and 2024, captaining the side in 2024.

== Professional career ==
Macpherson signed his first professional contract in November 2024, when he signed a loan deal to represent Toyota Verblitz for the 2024–25 Japan Rugby League One – Division 1 season. He made two appearances for the Japanese side. After returning from Japan, he was named in the Brumbies squad for the 2026 Super Rugby Pacific season.
