= Nathan Hastie =

New Zealand rugby union player

- Born: 27 April 2001 (age 25) Perth, Western Australia, Australia
- Height: 1.77 m (5 ft 10 in)
- Weight: 88 kg (194 lb; 13 st 12 lb)
- School: King's High School

Rugby union career
- Position: Scrum-half
- Current team: Otago, Western Force
Senior career
Years	Team	Apps	(Points)
2023–2025	Highlanders	12	(5)
2023–	Otago	29	(15)
2026–	Western Force	12	(0)
- Correct as of 30 May 2026

Nathan Hastie (born 27 April 2001) is an Australian professional rugby union player who plays as a scrum-half for Super Rugby club Western Force.

== Early life ==
Hastie plays his club rugby for Harbour RFC, and has been contracted to Otago since 2021, although yet to make an appearance due to injury.

== Club career ==
Hastie was called into the Highlanders squad ahead of Round 9 of the 2023 Super Rugby Pacific season, making his debut against the Force. He has been a member of the Otago squad since 2021, and was again named in their side for the 2023 Bunnings NPC. He has signed full-time for the Highlanders ahead of the 2024 season.
