= Hadley Tonga =

Australian rugby player (born 2005)

- Born: 2 June 2005 (age 21) Sydney, New South Wales, Australia
- Height: 172 cm (5 ft 8 in)
- Weight: 80 kg (176 lb)
- School: The King's School, Parramatta

Rugby union career
- Position: Winger
National sevens team
Years	Team	Comps
2025-	Australia 7s	

Hadley Tonga is an Australian rugby union player. He plays for the Australia national rugby sevens team.

== Career ==
He played for Australia at U18 level and received his first called-up for the Senior Australia national rugby sevens team in November 2023. He reportedly declined offers from NRL sides Eels and Dolphins to sign a three-year deal with the Australian Sevens program in 2023. However, his debut for Australia 7s was delayed by injuries which ruled him out for a total of 71 weeks.

He played for the 2025 Australia Sevens in January 2025, part of the 2024–25 SVNS series. As a result the time he lost through injury he chose to wear the number 71 whilst playing in the tournament. He scored in the final of the tournament, although Australia 7s ultimately finished as runners-up to Argentina. He continued with the Australia sevens team for the 2025-26 season.

== Style of play ==
He is renowned for his pace and has been dubbed "Australia's fastest player". He was timed at running 10.84 seconds for the 100 metres when he was still at high school.

== Personal life ==
He is from Western Sydney and attended The King's School, Parramatta. He is of Italian and Tongan descent.
