= Lee Allan =

New Zealand rugby union player

- Full name: Lee Allan
- Born: 13 September 1991 (age 35) Takapuna, New Zealand
- Height: 1.90 m (6 ft 3 in)
- Weight: 103 kg (16 st 3 lb; 227 lb)

Rugby union career
- Position: Loose forward
- Current team: Otago / Highlanders
Senior career
Years	Team	Apps	(Points)
2012–	Otago	34	(5)
2014–	Highlanders	2	(0)
- Correct as of 28 October 2016

Lee Allan (born 13 September 1991) is a former New Zealand rugby union player who played as a loose forward for Otago in the ITM Cup and the Highlanders in the international Super Rugby competition.

== Career ==
Allan made his name playing for the Otago Razorbacks in New Zealand's domestic competitions and made himself a regular in the Dunedin based side's number 7 jersey during the 2013 ITM Cup campaign. This saw him named in the Highlanders wider training squad for the 2014 Super Rugby season. He made his Super Rugby debut on 27 June 2014 as a second-half substitute in a 29–25 victory over the Chiefs.

Allan announced his retirement from the game in 2017 at age 25 due to on-going concussion issues. He has since taken up a role as Otago defence coach.
