= Nic Dolly =

England international rugby union player

- Born: Nicholas Dolly; 11 June 1999 (age 27) Sydney, Australia
- Height: 1.8 m (5 ft 11 in)
- Weight: 103 kg (227 lb)

Rugby union career
- Position: Hooker
- Current team: Western Force
Senior career
| Years | Team | Apps | (Points) |
| 2017–2020 | Sale Sharks | 4 | (0) |
| 2017–2018 | → Rotherham Titans | 6 | (0) |
| 2017–2019 | → Sale F.C. | 22 | (15) |
| 2019–2020 | → Jersey Reds | 11 | (15) |
| 2021 | Coventry | 3 | (15) |
| 2021–2024 | Leicester Tigers | 32 | (60) |
| 2025– | Western Force | 24 | (25) |
- Correct as of 30 May 2026
International career
| Years | Team | Apps | (Points) |
| 2017 | England U18 | 5 | (0) |
| 2019 | England U20 | 9 | (0) |
| 2021 | England | 1 | (0) |
- Correct as of 20 November 2021

Nic Dolly (born 11 June 1999) is a professional rugby union player who plays as a hooker for Western Force in Super Rugby. He previously played for Leicester Tigers in Premiership Rugby.

Born in Australia, Dolly is English qualified though his mother, represented the England under 20 side at the 2019 World Rugby Under 20 Championship and made his debut for the senior England team in 2021.

== Early life ==
Dolly grew up in Sydney, Australia and initially played rugby union for Eastwood Rugby Club and New South Wales Waratahs junior age sides. His maternal grandparents lived in Denton, Greater Manchester and while on an extended visit he was spotted by Sale Sharks. He subsequently joined their under 18s.

== Career ==
In 2017 Dolly signed a five-year contract with Sale Sharks, before spending time on dual-registration with Rotherham Titans in the RFU Championship, and Sale F.C. in National League 2 North. In 2017 he also represented the England under-18 team. On 28 August 2019 Jersey Reds announced the signing of Dolly on a year long loan. He represented England under-20 in the 2019 Six Nations Under 20s Championship and was also a member of the squad that finished fifth at the 2019 World Rugby Under 20 Championship.

In February 2021 Dolly joined Coventry for the delayed 2021 RFU Championship season, and scored three tries in as many matches. On 26 March 2021 he joined local rivals Leicester Tigers on what was reported as a multi-year deal.

Dolly made his first Premiership start against Exeter Chiefs on 18 September 2021, Dolly scored two tries, the first forward to do so on his Premiership debut for over 20 years. The following week he scored again in a win versus Gloucester and was named as BT Sports' man of the match.

He scored further tries against London Irish and Worcester Warriors, after which Dolly was called up to the senior England squad in October 2021 for Tests against Tonga, Australia and South Africa.

Dolly made his international debut for England against South Africa on 20 November 2021. Dolly was selected in the squad for the 2022 Six Nations Championship but did not feature in the matches, his form for Leicester earned him a call up to an England training camp in May 2022 but on 21 May 2022 Dolly suffered a significant knee injury following an illegal crocodile roll by Adam Brocklebank as Leicester beat Newcastle 27–5.

After an injury plagued spell Dolly was released from Leicester in April 2024, and quickly signed with Western Force, the Perth, Australia, based side.
