= Albert Alcock =

Australian rugby union player

- Born: 3 November 2003 (age 23) Sydney, New South Wales, Australia
- Height: 175 cm (5 ft 9 in)
- Notable relative: Milly Alcock (sister)

Rugby union career
- Position: Hooker
- Current team: Force
Senior career
| Years | Team | Apps | (Points) |
| 2025– | Force | 4 | (0) |
- Correct as of 9 September 2026

Albert Alcock is a professional Australian rugby union player, who plays for the Force. His preferred position is hooker.

== Early career ==
Alcock is from New South Wales and plays his club rugby for West Harbour. He came through the Waratahs academy before moving to Western Australia. He is the brother of actress Milly Alcock.

== Professional career ==
Alcock moved to the Force to join their academy in 2024. He featured for the Force on their South African tour in September 2024. He was called into the Force first team for Round 12 of the 2025 Super Rugby Pacific season, making his debut against the Blues.
