= Darcy Breen =

Australian rugby union player

- Born: 28 April 1999 (age 27) Australia
- Height: 187 cm (6 ft 2 in)
- Weight: 127 kg (280 lb; 20 st 0 lb)
- School: Scots College

Rugby union career
- Position: Prop
- Current team: Brumbies, Canterbury
Senior career
| Years | Team | Apps | (Points) |
| 2019 | Sydney | 0 | (0) |
| 2020–2021 | Waratahs | 8 | (0) |
| 2024–2025 | San Diego Legion | 30 | (0) |
| 2025 | Canterbury | 8 | (0) |
| 2026– | Brumbies | 7 | (0) |
- Correct as of 15 June 2026
International career
| Years | Team | Apps | (Points) |
| 2019 | Australia U20 | 4 | (0) |
- Correct as of 11 March 2026
Medal record
Men's rugby union
Representing Australia
Oceania U20 Championship
| Winner | 2019 Gold Coast |
Junior World Cup
| Runner-up | 2019 Argentina |

Darcy Breen (born 28 April 1999) is an Australian rugby union player, who plays for the Brumbies in the Super Rugby and Canterbury in the National Provincial Championship. His preferred position is prop.

== Early career ==
Breen was born in Australia and grew up in New South Wales. He originally played association football, before switching to rugby union when he attended Scots College where he earned selection for the Australian Schoolboys side in 2017. In 2018, after leaving school he joined the New South Wales Waratahs Gen Blue academy. After progressing through the academy, he was selected in the Australia U20 side in 2019. He plays his club rugby for Sydney University.

== Professional career ==
Breen was named in the Sydney side for the 2019 National Rugby Championship, but didn't make an appearance. He was then named in the development squad for the Waratahs ahead of the 2020 Super Rugby season, before being named in the full squad for the 2021 Super Rugby AU season, making his debut against the Rebels. He would make a further seven appearances for the side, before departing and returning to club rugby. He would return to professional rugby in 2024, signing with San Diego Legion ahead of the 2024 Major League Rugby season. He would make sixteen appearances in 2024, before re-signing for the 2025 season, earning an All-MLR honorable mention in the end-of-season awards. After the season, he would sign for Canterbury for the 2025 Bunnings NPC, helping the side win the competition. In March 2026, he was called into the Brumbies squad for round 5 of the 2026 Super Rugby Pacific season, being named to start the game against the Drua.
