= Tim Sail =

New Zealand rugby union player (born 1998)

- Born: 21 May 1998 (age 28) Napier, New Zealand
- Height: 190 cm (6 ft 3 in)
- Weight: 102 kg (225 lb; 16 st 1 lb)
- School: Auckland Grammar School

Rugby union career
- Position(s): Lock, Number 8, Flanker
Senior career
Years	Team	Apps	(Points)
2020–2021	North Harbour	10	(5)
2023–2024	Tasman	11	(15)
- Correct as of 13 October 2024

Tim J. Sail (born 21 May 1998) is a New Zealand rugby union player. He can play in the Lock, Number 8 and Flanker positions.

== Career ==
Sail played 10 games for North Harbour between 2020 and 2021. Sail was named in the Tasman development squad for the 2023 Bunnings NPC and made his debut for the side in Round 1 of the competition, coming off the bench against Otago in a 27–15 win for the Mako.
