= Jack Daly (rugby union) =

Irish rugby union player (born 1998)

- Born: 8 December 1998 (age 27) Currans, Ireland
- Height: 1.83 m (6 ft 0 in)
- Weight: 107 kg (16.8 st; 236 lb)

Rugby union career
- Position: Back-row
Amateur team(s)
Years	Team	Apps	(Points)
- Garryowen
Senior career
Years	Team	Apps	(Points)
2020–2025	Munster	7	(0)
- Correct as of 1 June 2025
International career
Years	Team	Apps	(Points)
2018	Ireland U20	3	(5)
2019	Ireland 7s	2	(0)
- Correct as of 17 June 2018

Jack Daly (born 12 August 1998) is an Irish rugby union player who plays as a flanker.

== Early life ==
Born in Currans, County Kerry, Daly first began playing rugby for Castleisland, and won representation for Munster at under-18, under-19 and under-20/development level, before going on to join Limerick club Garryowen.

== Munster ==
Daly made his first appearance for Munster A in their 2017–18 British and Irish Cup quarter-final defeat against Leinster A on 30 March 2018, and went on the join the Munster academy ahead of the 2018–19 season. He made five appearances for Munster A during the 2018–19 Celtic Cup during his first season in the academy, as well as starting in Munster A's 53–49 defeat against Leinster A in the Cara Cup, hosted in Weymouth, Massachusetts, in April 2019. He made his senior competitive debut for Munster in their 2020–21 Pro14 round 8 fixture against Italian side Zebre on 30 November 2020, coming on as a 57th minute replacement for Chris Cloete in the province's 52–3 win.

Daly joined the senior squad on a one-year contract from the 2021–22 season, and signed a two-year contract extension in January 2022. He made his European debut for Munster in their 2021–22 Champions Cup quarter-final defeat against French defending champions Toulouse on 7 May 2022.

== Ireland ==
Having missed out on selection initially, Daly was called up to the Ireland under-20s squad for the 2018 World Rugby Under 20 Championship as a replacement for injured fellow Munsterman Jack O'Sullivan, and he went on to make his debut for the team in their 24–20 defeat against Georgia on 7 June 2018, before going on to start in the loss to Scotland, in which he scored a try, and the win against Japan, as Ireland finished 9th in the tournament.

Daly was selected in the Ireland Sevens squad for 2019 London Sevens in May 2019, his first call-up to the squad. He was retained in the squad for the 2019 Paris Sevens.
