= Seta Baker =

New Zealand rugby union player

- Born: 15 February 2001 (age 25) Ōtara, New Zealand
- Height: 185 cm (6 ft 1 in)
- Weight: 106 kg (234 lb; 16 st 10 lb)
- School: Dilworth School

Rugby union career
- Position: Flanker
- Current team: New England Free Jacks, Manawatu
Senior career
Years	Team	Apps	(Points)
2023	Tasman	8	(5)
2024–	New England Free Jacks	14	(20)
2024–	Manawatu	1	(0)
- Correct as of 15 September 2024

Setaleki Baker (born 15 February 2001) is a New Zealand rugby union player who plays for the New England Free Jacks and Manawatu in the Bunnings NPC. His position is Flanker.

== Career ==
Baker was selected for the Crusaders under 20 squad in 2021. He won a scholarship to attend NMIT in Nelson. Baker was named in the Tasman squad for the 2023 Bunnings NPC and made his debut in Round 1 of the competition, coming off the bench in a 27–15 win for the Mako.

== Honours ==
New England Free Jacks

- Major League Rugby Championship: 2024
